= 2024–2025 opinion polling on the Biden administration =

Surveying on 2021–2025 US presidency

This is a list of opinion polls taken on the presidency of Joe Biden in 2024 and the first twenty days of January 2025. To navigate between years, see opinion polling on the Biden administration.

== January ==
Polling group	Date	Approve	Disapprove	Unsure	Sample size	Polling method	Segment polled	Ref.
Gallup	January 2–22, 2024	41%	54%	5%	1,011	phone	All adults	
YouGov (for CBS News)	January 3–5, 2024	41%	59%	0%	2,157	online	All adults	
Ipsos (for ABC News)	January 4–8, 2024	33%	58%	9%	2,228	online	All adults	
YouGov (for The Economist)	January 7–9, 2024	40%	53%	6%	1,593	online	All adults	
Harris (for Harvard CAPS)	January 16–17, 2024	42%	57%	2%	2,346	online	Registered voters	
Quinnipiac University	January 25–29, 2024	40%	55%	3%	1,650	phone	Registered voters	
YouGov (for Yahoo! News)	January 25–29, 2024	40%	56%	4%	1,594	online	All adults	
Emerson College	January 26–29, 2024	42%	46%	12%	1,260	IVR/online	Registered voters	
Marist College (for NPR/PBS)	January 29–February 1, 2024	40%	54%	6%	1,582	phone/online	All adults	

== February ==
Polling group	Date	Approve	Disapprove	Unsure	Sample size	Polling method	Segment polled	Ref.
Gallup	February 1–20, 2024	38%	59%	3%	1,016	phone	All adults	
YouGov (for The Economist)	February 4–6, 2024	42%	55%	4%	1,591	online	All adults	
Monmouth University	February 8–12, 2024	38%	58%	4%	902	telephone	All adults	
YouGov (for CBS News)	February 12–14, 2024	42%	58%	0%	1,744	online	All adults	
Emerson College	February 13–14, 2024	42%	47%	11%	1,225	IVR/online	Registered voters	
Quinnipiac University	February 15–19, 2024	40%	57%	3%	1,421	telephone	Registered voters	
Harris (for Harvard CAPS)	February 21–22, 2024	45%	54%	1%	2,022	online	Registered voters	
Ipsos (for Reuters)	February 23–25, 2024	37%	58%	5%	1,020	online	All adults	
The New York Times/Siena College	February 25–28, 2024	36%	61%	3%	980	telephone	Registered voters	
Beacon/Shaw & Company (for Fox News)	February 25–28, 2024	42%	58%	1%	1,262	phone/online	Registered voters	

== March ==
Polling group	Date	Approve	Disapprove	Unsure	Sample size	Polling method	Segment polled	Ref.
Gallup	March 1–20, 2024	40%	55%	5%	1,016	phone	All adults	
YouGov (for Yahoo! News)	March 8–11, 2024	39%	55%	6%	1,482	online	All adults	
Emerson College	March 5–6, 2024	41%	48%	11%	1,350	IVR/online	Registered voters	
Harris (for Harvard CAPS)	March 20–21, 2024	45%	52%	2%	2,271	online	Registered voters	
Quinnipiac University	March 21–25, 2024	37%	59%	3%	1,407	telephone	Registered voters	
Ipsos (for Reuters)	March 22–24, 2024	40%	56%	4%	1,021	online	All adults	
Beacon/Shaw & Company (for Fox News)	March 22–25, 2024	41%	58%	1%	1,094	phone/online	Registered voters	
YouGov (for The Economist)	March 24–26, 2024	38%	57%	5%	1,594	online	All adults	
Marist College (for NPR/PBS)	March 25–28, 2024	43%	53%	3%	1,305	telephone/online	All adults	

== April ==
Polling group	Date	Approve	Disapprove	Unsure	Sample size	Polling method	Segment polled	Ref.
Gallup	April 1–22, 2024	38%	58%	4%	1,001	phone	All adults	
YouGov (for The Economist)	April 6–9, 2024	37%	59%	3%	1,795	online	All adults	
The New York Times/Siena College	April 7–11, 2024	38%	59%	3%	1,059	telephone	Registered voters	
YouGov (for CBS News)	April 9–12, 2024	40%	60%	0%	2,399	online	All adults	
Pew Research Center	April 8–14, 2024	35%	62%	3%	8,709	online	All adults	
Ipsos (for Reuters)	April 12–14, 2024	38%	56%	6%	1,016	online	All adults	
Monmouth University	April 18–22, 2024	41%	56%	3%	746	telephone	All adults	
Quinnipiac University	April 18–22, 2024	35%	61%	3%	1,429	telephone	Registered voters	
Marist College (for NPR/PBS)	April 22–25, 2024	42%	53%	4%	1,109	telephone/online	All adults	
Harris (for Harvard CAPS)	April 24–25, 2024	44%	53%	2%	1,961	online	Registered voters	
Ipsos (for ABC News)	April 25–30, 2024	35%	57%	8%	2,260	online	All adults	
YouGov (for The Economist)	April 28–30, 2024	42%	58%	1%	1,475	online	Registered voters	

== May ==
Polling group	Date	Approve	Disapprove	Unsure	Sample size	Polling method	Segment polled	Ref.
Gallup	May 1–23, 2024	39%	56%	5%	1,024	telephone	All adults	
YouGov (for The Economist)	May 5–7, 2024	41%	58%	1%	1,590	online	Registered voters	
YouGov (for Yahoo! News)	May 10–13, 2024	38%	57%	5%	1,790	online	All adults	
Beacon/Shaw & Company (for Fox News)	May 10–13, 2024	45%	55%	1%	1,126	phone/online	Registered voters	
Harris (for Harvard CAPS)	May 15–16, 2024	44%	54%	1%	1,660	online	Registered voters	
Quinnipiac University	May 16–20, 2024	40%	54%	3%	1,374	telephone	Registered voters	
Ipsos (for Reuters)	May 17–20, 2024	36%	59%	5%	1,017	online	All adults	
Marist College (for NPR/PBS)	May 21–23, 2024	41%	54%	5%	1,261	telephone/online	All adults	
Emerson College	May 21–23, 2024	37%	52%	12%	1,100	IVR/online	Registered voters	
YouGov (for The Economist)	May 25–28, 2024	39%	58%	2%	1,748	online	All adults	

== June ==
Polling group	Date	Approve	Disapprove	Unsure	Sample size	Polling method	Segment polled	Ref.
YouGov (for The Economist)	June 2–4, 2024	40%	56%	3%	1,766	online	All adults	
Gallup	June 3–23, 2024	38%	58%	4%	1,005	telephone	All adults	
Emerson College	June 4–5, 2024	37%	53%	10%	1,000	IVR/online	Registered voters	
YouGov (for Yahoo! News)	June 3–6, 2024	37%	58%	5%	1,854	online	All adults	
Monmouth University	June 6–10, 2024	38%	58%	4%	1,106	telephone	All adults	
Marist College (for NPR/PBS)	June 10–12, 2024	41%	53%	6%	1,311	telephone/online	All adults	
YouGov (for George Washington University)	June 11–24, 2024	43%	56%	1%	2,750	online	Registered voters	
Beacon/Shaw & Company (for Fox News)	June 14–17, 2024	45%	55%	0%	1,095	telephone/online	Registered voters	
Quinnipiac University	June 20–24, 2024	38%	57%	4%	1,405	telephone	Registered voters	
The New York Times/Siena College	June 20–25, 2024	35%	61%	4%	1,226	telephone	Registered voters	
Ipsos (for Reuters)	June 21–23, 2024	37%	57%	6%	1,019	online	All adults	
YouGov (for The Economist)	June 23–25, 2024	43%	56%	1%	1,401	telephone	Registered voters	
SSRS Opinion Panel (for CNN)	June 28–30, 2024	36%	64%	0%	1,274	telephone/online	Registered voters	
Harris (for Harvard CAPS)	June 28–30, 2024	40%	57%	4%	2,090	online	Registered voters	
Suffolk University (for USA Today)	June 28–30, 2024	41%	57%	2%	1,000	online	Registered voters	
YouGov (for Yahoo! News)	June 28–July 1, 2024	38%	57%	6%	1,754	online	All adults	
The New York Times/Siena College	June 28–July 2, 2024	36%	61%	4%	1,235	telephone	Registered voters	
YouGov (for The Economist)	June 30–July 2, 2024	41%	58%	1%	1,392	online	Registered voters	

== July ==
Polling group	Date	Approve	Disapprove	Unsure	Sample size	Polling method	Segment polled	Ref.
Pew Research Center	July 1–7, 2024	32%	66%	2%	9,424	online	All adults	
Ipsos (for Washington Post/ABC News)	July 5–9, 2024	36%	57%	7%	2,431	online	All adults	
Emerson College	July 7–8, 2024	39%	52%	9%	1,370	IVR/online	Registered voters	
YouGov (for The Economist)	July 7–9, 2024	37%	60%	3%	1,620	online	All adults	
Beacon/Shaw & Company (for Fox News)	July 7–10, 2024	42%	58%	0%	1,210	telephone/online	Registered voters	
Marist College (for NPR/PBS)	July 9–10, 2024	43%	52%	5%	1,309	telephone/online	All adults	
The Center Square/Noble Predictive Insights	July 8–11, 2024	43%	56%	2%	2,295	telephone/online	Likely voters	
Quinnipiac University	July 19–21, 2024	38%	57%	2%	1,257	telephone	Registered voters	
The New York Times/Siena College	July 22–24, 2024	41%	56%	3%	1,142	telephone	Registered voters	
Harris (for Harvard CAPS)	July 26–28, 2024	42%	55%	3%	2,196	online	Registered voters	
Ipsos (for Reuters)	July 26–28, 2024	37%	58%	5%	1,025	online	All adults	

== August ==
Polling group	Date	Approve	Disapprove	Unsure	Sample size	Polling method	Segment polled	Ref.
Gallup	August 1–20, 2024	43%	53%	4%	1,015	telephone	All adults	
Marist College (for NPR/PBS)	August 1–4, 2024	46%	51%	3%	1,613	online	All adults	
YouGov (for The Economist)	August 4–6, 2024	39%	56%	4%	1,618	online	All adults	
Beacon/Shaw & Company (for Fox News)	August 9–12, 2024	41%	59%	0%	1,105	phone/online	Registered voters	
Ipsos (for Washington Post/ABC News)	August 9–13, 2024	37%	55%	8%	2,336	online	All adults	
Emerson College	August 12–14, 2024	39%	53%	8%	1,000	IVR/online	Likely voters	
Ipsos (for Reuters)	August 23–25, 2024	39%	54%	7%	1,028	online	All adults	
YouGov (for Yahoo! News)	August 23–25, 2024	43%	56%	1%	1,192	online	Registered voters	
Quinnipiac University	August 23–27, 2024	45%	52%	3%	1,611	telephone	Likely voters	
YouGov (for The Economist)	August 25–27, 2024	39%	55%	6%	1,555	online	All adults	

== September ==
Polling group	Date	Approve	Disapprove	Unsure	Sample size	Polling method	Segment polled	Ref.
Emerson College	September 3–4, 2024	41%	53%	6%	1,000	IVR/online	Likely voters	
Marist College (for NPR/PBS)	September 3–5, 2024	43%	51%	6%	1,529	online	All adults	
Harris (for Harvard CAPS)	September 4–5, 2024	42%	55%	3%	2,358	online	Registered voters	
The New York Times/Siena College	September 3–6, 2024	37%	59%	4%	1,374	telephone	Registered voters	
YouGov (for The Economist)	September 8–10, 2024	39%	57%	4%	1,626	online	All adults	
Beacon/Shaw & Company (for Fox News)	September 13–16, 2024	42%	58%	0%	1,102	phone/online	Registered voters	
YouGov (for The Economist)	September 15–17, 2024	39%	55%	6%	1,592	online	All adults	
Quinnipiac University	September 19–22, 2024	45%	52%	3%	1,611	telephone	Likely voters	
Ipsos (for Reuters)	September 20–22, 2024	39%	54%	7%	1,028	online	All adults	

== October ==
Polling group	Date	Approve	Disapprove	Unsure	Sample size	Polling method	Segment polled	Ref.
YouGov (for Yahoo! News)	October 2–4, 2024	37%	59%	4%	1,711	online	All adults	
HarrisX	October 9–11, 2024	40%	56%	4%	2,010	online	Registered voters	
Gallup	October 1–12, 2024	39%	56%	5%	1,023	telephone	All adults	
Harris (for Harvard CAPS)	October 11–13, 2024	42%	55%	3%	3,145	online	Registered voters	
Beacon/Shaw & Company (for Fox News)	October 11–14, 2024	40%	59%	0%	1,110	phone/online	Registered voters	
Emerson College	October 14–16, 2024	42%	53%	5%	1,000	IVR/online	Likely voters	
Ipsos (for ABC News)	October 18–22, 2024	36%	57%	7%	2,808	online	All adults	
YouGov (for The Economist)	October 19–22, 2024	39%	55%	6%	1,555	online	All adults	
The New York Times/Siena College	October 20–23, 2024	38%	58%	4%	2,097	telephone	Registered voters	
Emerson College	October 23–24, 2024	41%	53%	6%	1,000	IVR/online	Likely voters	
Gallup	October 14–27, 2024	41%	56%	3%	1,007	telephone	All adults	
Ipsos (for Reuters)	October 25–27, 2024	35%	60%	5%	1,150	online	All adults	
YouGov (for Yahoo! News)	October 29–31, 2024	40%	56%	4%	1,710	online	Registered voters	

== November ==
Polling group	Date	Approve	Disapprove	Unsure	Sample size	Polling method	Segment polled	Ref.
Ipsos	November 1–3, 2024	37%	57%	6%	1,242	online	All adults	
Emerson College	October 30–November 2, 2024	40%	53%	7%	1,000	IVR/online	Likely voters	
HarrisX (for Forbes)	October 30–November 2, 2024	38%	57%	5%	4,520	online	Registered voters	
YouGov (for The Economist)	November 6–7, 2024	41%	57%	2%	1,590	online	All adults	
YouGov (for The Economist)	November 9–12, 2024	38%	56%	6%	1,743	online	All adults	
Harris (for Harvard CAPS)	November 13–14, 2024	40%	55%	5%	1,732	online	Registered voters	
Gallup	November 6–20, 2024	43%	53%	4%	1,015	telephone	All adults	
YouGov (for CBS News)	November 19–22, 2024	39%	61%	0%	2,232	online	All adults	
Emerson College	November 20–22, 2024	36%	52%	12%	1,000	IVR/online	Likely voters	
YouGov (for The Economist)	November 23–26, 2024	38%	55%	7%	1,590	online	All adults	

== December ==
Polling group	Date	Approve	Disapprove	Unsure	Sample size	Polling method	Segment polled	Ref.
Quinnipiac University	December 12–16, 2024	38%	52%	10%	924	telephone	Likely voters	
Gallup	December 2–18, 2024	39%	56%	5%	1,003	telephone	All adults	
Ipsos (for Reuters)	December 13–15, 2024	38%	57%	5%	1,029	online	All adults	
Emerson College	December 11–13, 2024	36%	54%	10%	1,000	IVR/online	Likely voters	
Monmouth University	December 5–10, 2024	35%	60%	5%	1,006	phone/online	All adults	
Beacon/Shaw & Company (for Fox News)	December 6–9, 2024	41%	58%	1%	1,015	phone/online	Registered voters	
YouGov (for The Economist)	December 8–10, 2024	36%	58%	6%	1,593	online	All adults	

== January 2025 ==
Polling group	Date	Approve	Disapprove	Unsure	Sample size	Polling method	Segment polled	Ref.
YouGov (for The Economist)	January 5–8, 2025	37%	57%	6%	1,704	online	All adults	
Beacon/Shaw & Company (for Fox News)	January 10–13, 2025	42%	57%	1%	922	phone/online	Registered voters	
Harris (for Harvard CAPS)	January 15–16, 2025	39%	57%	4%	2,650	online	Registered voters	
YouGov (for CBS News)	January 15–17, 2025	37%	57%	6%	2,174	online	All adults	

== Biden job approval by race ==
=== With White Americans ===
July 2025
Poll source	Date	Sample size (Note: Key: A – all adults RV – registered voters LV – likely voters V – unclear)	MoE	Approve	Disapprove	Unsure/ Other	Net
The Economist/YouGov	April 28–30, 2024			32%	64%	4%	−32%
The Economist/YouGov	May 5–7, 2024			35%	62%	3%	−27%
The Economist/YouGov	June 23–25, 2024			33%	63%	4%	−30%
The Economist/YouGov	June 30–July 2, 2024			34%	62%	4%	−28%
The Economist/YouGov	November 6–7, 2024			36%	63%	1%	−27%

=== With Black Americans ===
July 2025
Poll source	Date	Sample size	MoE	Approve	Disapprove	Unsure/ Other	Net
The Economist/YouGov	April 28–30, 2024			62%	29%	10%	+33%
The Economist/YouGov	May 5–7, 2024			52%	35%	12%	+17%
The Economist/YouGov	June 23–25, 2024			53%	34%	13%	+19%
The Economist/YouGov	June 30–July 2, 2024			62%	29%	9%	+33%
The Economist/YouGov	November 6–7, 2024			67%	29%	4%	+38%

=== With Hispanic Americans ===
July 2025
Poll source	Date	Sample size	MoE	Approve	Disapprove	Unsure/ Other	Net
The Economist/YouGov	April 28–30, 2024			37%	57%	5%	−20%
The Economist/YouGov	May 5–7, 2024			38%	57%	5%	−15%
The Economist/YouGov	June 23–25, 2024			38%	53%	9%	−15%
The Economist/YouGov	June 30–July 2, 2024			29%	62%	9%	−33%
The Economist/YouGov	November 6–7, 2024			43%	54%	3%	−11%
