= 2021 opinion polling on the Biden administration =

Surveying on 2021–2025 US presidency

This is a list of opinion polls taken on the presidency of Joe Biden in 2021. To navigate between years, see opinion polling on the Joe Biden administration. For 2022 opinion polling, see 2022 opinion polling on the Biden administration.

Biden's average approval rating was generally over 50% in the first 6 months of his presidency. In late July, his approval rating started to decline. With the fall of Kabul in mid-August and a majority of Americans disapproving of Biden's handling of the withdrawal from Afghanistan, as well as the continued rise in COVID-19 cases, his average disapproval rating became higher than his average approval rating in late August. Biden started having an average disapproval rating of over 50% in late October. By then, Afghanistan had largely faded from the news, leading some to believe the COVID-19 pandemic, worsened by the Delta variant, and the polarization regarding measures like vaccine mandates, caused his low approval rating. Others have emphasized that the high inflation, which hit a 39-year high, negatively affected his approval rating.

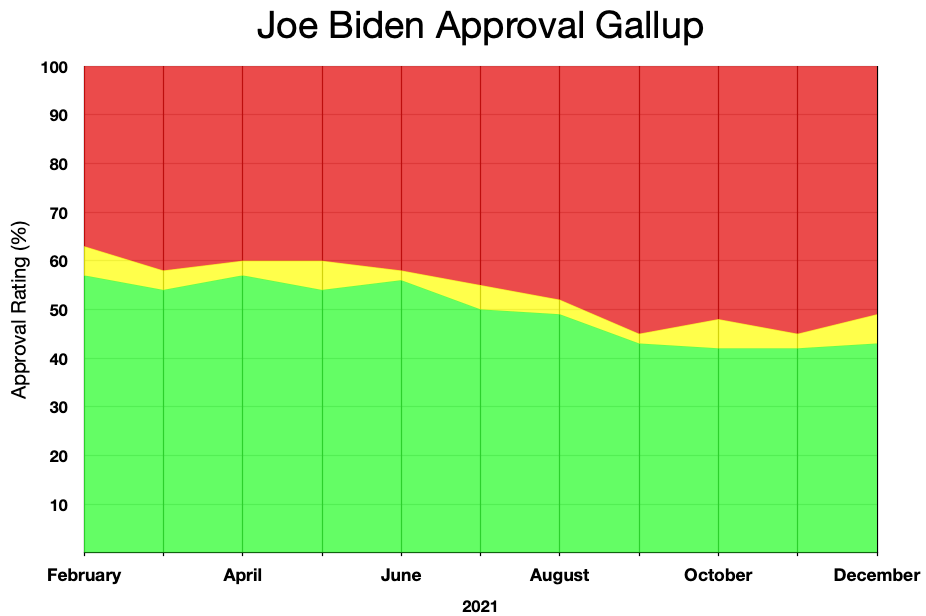
Joe Biden presidential approval rating from Gallup for 2021 Disapprove Unsure Approve

== January ==
Polling group	Date	Approve	Disapprove	Unsure	Sample size	Polling method	Segment polled	Source(s)
Harris Interactive (for The Hill)	January 28–29, 2021	61%	39%	0%	945	online	Registered voters	
Investor's Business Daily/TIPP	January 27–29, 2021	53%	29%	24%	1,261	online/phone	All adults	
Marist College	January 24–27, 2021	49%	35%	16%	1,313	phone	All adults	
Rasmussen Reports	January 24–26, 2021	48%	48%	4%	1,500	IVR/online	Likely voters	
YouGov (for The Economist)	January 24–26, 2021	51%	33%	16%	1,500	online	All adults	
Echelon Insights	January 20–26, 2021	55%	33%	12%	1,006		Registered voters	
Data for Progress	January 22–25, 2021	57%	36%	7%	1,164	online	Likely voters	
Morning Consult (for Politico)	January 22–25, 2021	59%	32%	9%	1,990	online	Registered voters	
Rasmussen Reports	January 21–25, 2021	48%	47%	5%	1,500	IVR/online	Likely voters	
Morning Consult	January 22–24, 2021	53%	29%	18%	15,000	online	All adults	
Monmouth University	January 21–24, 2021	54%	30%	16%	809	phone	All adults	
RMG Research (for Just the News)	January 21–23, 2021	58%	32%	11%	1,200	IVR/online	Registered voters	
Harris Interactive (for The Hill)	January 21–22, 2021	63%	37%	0%	941	online	Registered voters	
Morning Consult	January 20–21, 2021	56%	31%	13%	1,993	online	Registered voters	
Ipsos (for Reuters)	January 20–21, 2021	55%	32%	13%	1,115	online	All adults	
Ipsos (for Reuters)	January 20–21, 2021	57%	32%	11%	1,115	online	Registered voters	
Rasmussen Reports	January 22, 2021	48%	45%	7%	N/A	IVR/online	Likely voters	
YouGov (for Yahoo! News)	January 20–21, 2021	45%	28%	26%	1,516	online	All adults	
Morning Consult	January 19–21, 2021	50%	28%	22%	15,000	online	All adults	

== February ==
Polling group	Date	Approve	Disapprove	Unsure	Sample size	Polling method	Segment polled	Source(s)
Global Strategy Group/GBAO	January 27 – February 1, 2021	53%	39%	8%	1,005		Registered voters	
AP/NORC (for Associated Press)	January 28 – February 1, 2021	61%	38%	1%	1,055	online/phone	All adults	

== March ==
Polling group	Date	Approve	Disapprove	Unsure	Sample size	Polling method	Segment polled	Source(s)
Marist College	March 3–8, 2021	49%	42%	10%	1,227	phone	All adults	
YouGov (for The Economist)	March 13–17, 2021	53%	37%	9%	1,500	online	All adults	

== April ==
Polling group	Date	Approve	Disapprove	Unsure	Sample size	Polling method	Segment polled	Source(s)
ABC News/The Washington Post	April 18–21, 2021	52%	42%	6%	1,007	phone	All adults	

== August ==
Polling group	Date	Approve	Disapprove	Unsure	Sample size	Polling method	Segment polled	Source(s)
Harris Interactive (for The Hill)	August 4–5, 2021	55%	40%	5%	1,103	online	Registered voters	
Fox News	August 7–10, 2021	53%	46%	2%	1,002	phone	Registered voters	
Marist College	August 26–31, 2021	43%	51%	7%	1,241	phone	All adults	

== September ==
Polling group	Date	Approve	Disapprove	Unsure	Sample size	Polling method	Segment polled	Source(s)
Investor's Business Daily/TIPP	September 1–3, 2021	44%	43%	12%	1,305	online/phone	All adults	
Fox News	September 12–15, 2021	50%	49%	1%	1,002	phone	Registered voters	
Rasmussen Reports	September 23, 2021	45%	54%	0%	1,500	IVR/online	Likely voters	

== October ==
Polling group	Date	Approve	Disapprove	Unsure	Sample size	Polling method	Segment polled	Source(s)
Investor's Business Daily/TIPP	September 29 – October 2, 2021	44%	40%	16%	1,308	online/phone	All adults	
Rasmussen Reports	October 4, 2021	43%	56%	1%	1,500	IVR/online	Likely voters	
Trafalgar Group	October 4–6, 2021	40%	56%	4%	1,087	IVR/online	Likely voters	
Gallup	October 1–19, 2021	42%	52%	6%	823	phone	All adults	
Investor's Business Daily/TIPP	October 27–29, 2021	40%	45%	15%	1,306	online/phone	All adults	

== November ==
Polling group	Date	Approve	Disapprove	Unsure	Sample size	Polling method	Segment polled	Source(s)
Emerson College	November 3–4, 2021	41%	52%	8%	1,000	IVR/online	Registered voters	
Suffolk University (for USA Today)	November 3–5, 2021	38%	59%	3%	1,000	phone	Registered voters	
YouGov (for The Economist)	November 6–9, 2021	42%	48%	10%	1,500	online	All adults	
Quinnipiac University	November 11–15, 2021	36%	53%	10%	1,387	phone	All adults	
Fox News	November 14–17, 2021	44%	54%	2%	1,003	phone	Registered voters	
YouGov (for The Economist)	November 20–23, 2021	41%	49%	10%	1,500	online	All adults	
Trafalgar Group	November 26–29, 2021	36.3%	59.1%	4.6%	1,082	IVR/online	Likely voters	

== December ==
Polling group	Date	Approve	Disapprove	Unsure	Sample size	Polling method	Segment polled	Source(s)
Ipsos	December 1–2, 2021	46%	49%	5%	1,005	IVR/online	All adults	
CNBC	December 1–4, 2021	41%	50%	9%	800	phone	All adults	
Fox News	December 11–14, 2021	47%	51%	2%	1,002	phone	Registered voters	
