= 2022 opinion polling on the Biden administration =

Surveying on 2021–2025 US presidency

This is a list of opinion polls taken on the presidency of Joe Biden in 2022. To navigate between years, see opinion polling on the Biden administration. For 2023 opinion polling, see 2023 opinion polling on the Biden administration.

Throughout 2022, Biden continued having a higher disapproval than approval rating, which had begun in August 2021. Biden's approval was steady throughout the year at approximately 42% with the exception of a significant dip during the summer which saw a period of high gas prices and high inflation. At certain points, two-thirds of Americans disapproved of Biden's handling of the economy.

According to the Gallup poll, during Biden's seventh quarter in office (defined as July 20 to October 19) he had approximately a 42% approval rating. This was found comparable to other presidents at the same time during their first term since Jimmy Carter, with the exception of the majority approval enjoyed by both George H. W. Bush and George W. Bush.

== January ==
Polling group	Date	Approve	Disapprove	Unsure	Sample size	Polling method	Segment polled	Source(s)
YouGov (for The Economist)	January 2–4, 2022	40%	50%	10%	1,500	online	All adults	
Rasmussen Reports	January 3–5, 2022	43%	57%	0%	1,500	online	Likely voters	
Ipsos (for Reuters)	January 5–6, 2022	45%	51%	4%	1,000	online	All adults	
Investor's Business Daily/TIPP	January 5–9, 2022	44%	45%	11%	1,308	online	Likely voters	
Quinnipiac University	January 7–10, 2022	33%	53%	13%	1,313	telephone	All adults	
Ipsos (for Reuters)	January 12–13, 2022	45%	50%	5%	1,005	online	All adults	
YouGov (for CBS News)	January 12–14, 2022	44%	56%	0%	2,094	online	All adults	
YouGov (for The Economist)	January 15–18, 2022	39%	51%	10%	1,500	online	All adults	
Ipsos (for Reuters)	January 19–20, 2022	43%	52%	5%	1,004	online	All adults	
Monmouth University	January 20–24, 2022	39%	54%	7%	794	telephone	All adults	
Ipsos (for Reuters)	January 26–27, 2022	43%	50%	7%	1,002	online	All adults	

== February ==
Polling group	Date	Approve	Disapprove	Unsure	Sample size	Polling method	Segment polled	Source(s)
YouGov (for The Economist)	January 29 – February 1, 2022	42%	49%	9%	1,500	online	All adults	
Ipsos (for Reuters)	February 2–3, 2022	41%	56%	3%	1,005	online	All adults	
Ipsos (for Reuters)	January 31 – February 7, 2022	45%	52%	3%	4,404	online	All adults	
Ipsos (for Reuters)	February 7–8, 2022	43%	51%	6%	1,005	online	All adults	
Ipsos (for Reuters)	February 14–15, 2022	44%	51%	5%	1,005	online	All adults	
Emerson College	February 19–20, 2022	42%	50%	8%	1,138	IVR/online	Registered voters	
YouGov (for The Economist)	February 19–22, 2022	44%	50%	6%	1,290	online	Registered voters	
Ipsos (for Reuters)	February 22–23, 2022	43%	53%	4%	1,004	online	All adults	
Quinnipiac University	February 25–27, 2022	37%	52%	11%	1,364	telephone	All adults	
YouGov (for CBS News)	February 24–28, 2022	44%	56%	0%	2,238	online	All adults	

== March ==
Polling group	Date	Approve	Disapprove	Unsure	Sample size	Polling method	Segment polled	Source(s)
Ipsos (for Reuters)	February 28 – March 1, 2022	43%	54%	3%	1,005	online	All adults	
NPR/PBS/Marist College	March 1–2, 2022	47%	50%	3%	1,322	telephone	All adults	
Ipsos (for Reuters)	March 7–8, 2022	45%	49%	6%	1,005	online	All adults	
YouGov (for CBS News)	March 8–11, 2022	43%	57%	0%	2,088	online	All adults	
Ipsos (for Reuters)	March 14–15, 2022	43%	53%	4%	1,005	online	All adults	
Emerson College	March 18–20, 2022	43%	49%	8%	1,023	IVR/online	Registered voters	
Ipsos (for Reuters)	March 21–22, 2022	40%	54%	6%	1,005	online	All adults	
Marist College	March 22–29, 2022	39%	54%	7%	1,170	telephone	All adults	
YouGov (for The Economist)	March 26–29, 2022	45%	49%	6%	1,313	online	Registered voters	
Ipsos (for Reuters)	March 28–29, 2022	42%	52%	6%	1,005	online	All adults	

== April ==
Polling group	Date	Approve	Disapprove	Unsure	Sample size	Polling method	Segment polled	Source(s)
YouGov (for The Economist)	April 2–5, 2022	43%	50%	7%	1,287	online	Registered voters	
Ipsos (for Reuters)	April 4–5, 2022	45%	50%	5%	1,001	online	All adults	
Investor's Business Daily/TIPP	April 6–8, 2022	42%	43%	15%	1,305	online	All adults	
YouGov (for The Economist)	April 9–12, 2022	44%	48%	8%	1,500	online	All adults	
Ipsos (for Reuters)	April 11–12, 2022	41%	53%	6%	1,005	online	All adults	
Ipsos (for Reuters)	April 18–19, 2022	43%	51%	6%	1,005	online	All adults	
Emerson College	April 25–26, 2022	42%	50%	8%	1,000	IVR/online	Registered voters	
Ipsos (for Reuters)	April 25–26, 2022	42%	53%	5%	1,005	online	All adults	
YouGov (for The Economist)	April 26–27, 2022	41%	49%	10%	1,500	online	All adults	
ABC News/The Washington Post	April 24–28, 2022	42%	52%	6%	1,004	telephone	All adults	

== May ==
Polling group	Date	Approve	Disapprove	Unsure	Sample size	Polling method	Segment polled	Source(s)
Ipsos (for Reuters)	May 2–3, 2022	43%	50%	7%	1,005	online	All adults	
YouGov (for The Economist)	May 5–9, 2022	38%	55%	7%	1,000	online	All adults	
Ipsos (for Reuters)	May 9–10, 2022	42%	50%	8%	1,005	online	All adults	
Morning Consult	May 13–16, 2022	44%	54%	2%	2,005	online	Registered voters	
YouGov (for The Economist)	May 15–17, 2022	41%	50%	9%	1,500	online	All adults	
YouGov (for The Economist)	May 18–20, 2022	44%	56%	0%	2,041	online	All adults	
Gallup (company)	May 2–22, 2022	41%	54%	3%	1,007	online	All adults	
YouGov (for Yahoo! News)	May 19–22, 2022	42%	53%	5%	1,573	online	All adults	
Rasmussen Reports	May 19–23, 2022	42%	57%	1%	1,500	online	Likely voters	
Morning Consult	May 20–22, 2022	42%	56%	2%	2,005	online	Registered voters	
Morning Consult	May 18–24, 2022	40%	52%	8%	45,000	online	All adults	
YouGov (for The Economist)	May 21–24, 2022	41%	49%	10%	1,500	online	All adults	
YouGov (for The Economist)	May 21–24, 2022	44%	51%	5%	1,500	online	Registered voters	
Rasmussen Reports	May 22–24	43%	56%	1%	1,500	online	Likely voters	
Ipsos (for) Reuters)	May 23–24	36%	59%	5%	1,005	online	All adults	
Emerson College	May 24–25, 2022	38%	52%	0%	1,148	IVR/online	Registered voters	
Rasmussen Reports	May 25–29	43%	55%	2%	1,500	online	Likely voters	
Morning Consult	May 25–31	40%	53%	7%	45,000	online	All adults	

== June ==
Polling group	Date	Approve	Disapprove	Unsure	Sample size	Polling method	Segment polled	Source(s)
Ipsos (for) Reuters)	May 31 – June 1, 2022	42%	52%	6%	1,005	online	All adults	
Rasmussen Reports	May 30 – June 1, 2022	41%	57%	2%	1,500	online	Likely voters	
Rasmussen Reports	May 31 – June 2, 2022	40%	58%	2%	1,500	online	Likely voters	
Rasmussen Reports	June 1–5, 2022	41%	57%	2%	1,500	online	Likely voters	
Morning Consult	June 4–5	39%	58%	3%	2,006	online	Registered voters	
Marist College	May 31 – June 6, 2022	38%	53%	9%	1,063	telephone	All adults	
Quinnipiac University	June 3–6, 2022	33%	55%	12%	1,576	telephone	All adults	
Morning Consult	June 1–7, 2022	39%	53%	7%	45,000	online	All adults	
YouGov (for The Economist)	June 4–7, 2022	42%	49%	9%	1,500	online	All adults	
Ipsos (for) Reuters)	June 6–7, 2022	41%	56%	3%	1,500	online	All adults	
Ipsos (for Reuters)	June 13–14, 2022	39%	56%	5%	1,005	online	All adults	
Trafalgar Group	June 20–22, 2022	35%	60%	5%	1,079	IVR/online	Likely voters	
Ipsos (for Reuters)	June 21–22, 2022	36%	58%	6%	1,002	online	All adults	
Ipsos (for Reuters)	June 27–28, 2022	38%	57%	5%	1,005	online	All adults	
Emerson College	June 28–29, 2022	40%	53%	7%	1,271	IVR/online	Registered voters	

== July ==
Polling group	Date	Approve	Disapprove	Unsure	Sample size	Polling method	Segment polled	Source(s)
YouGov (for The Economist)	July 2–5, 2022	38%	52%	9%	1,500	online	All adults	
Ipsos (for Reuters)	July 5–6, 2022	36%	59%	5%	1,003	online	All adults	
YouGov (for Yahoo ! News)	July 8–11, 2022	41%	57%	2%	1,264	online	Registered voters	
Ipsos (for Reuters)	July 11–12, 2022	39%	55%	6%	1,004	online	All adults	
Beacon Research (for Fox News)	July 10–13, 2022	40%	59%	1%	1,001	telephone	Registered voters	
Rasmussen Reports	July 14–18, 2022	39%	60%	1%	1,500	telephone/online	Likely voters	
Quinnipiac University	July 14–18, 2022	33%	59%	8%	1,367	telephone	Registered voters	
Ipsos (for Reuters)	July 18–19, 2022	36%	59%	5%	1,004	online	All adults	
Rasmussen Reports	July 18–20, 2022	36%	61%	3%	1,500	telephone/online	Likely voters	
Emerson College	July 19–20, 2022	40%	53%	7%	1,078	IVR/online	Registered voters	
Ipsos (for Reuters)	July 25–26, 2022	37%	58%	5%	1,004	online	All adults	
YouGov (for CBS News)	July 27–29, 2022	42%	58%	0%	1,743	online	Registered voters	

== August ==
Polling group	Date	Approve	Disapprove	Unsure	Sample size	Polling method	Segment polled	Source(s)
Ipsos (for Reuters)	August 1–2, 2022	38%	57%	5%	1,004	online	All adults	
Bacon Research (for Fox News)	August 6–9, 2022	42%	58%	0%	1,002	telephone	Registered voters	
Ipsos (for Reuters)	August 8–9, 2022	40%	55%	5%	1,005	online	All adults	
YouGov (for The Economist)	August 13–16, 2022	44%	51%	5%	1,331	online	Registered voters	
Ipsos (for Reuters)	August 15–16, 2022	38%	57%	5%	1,005	online	All adults	
Marist College	August 15–18, 2022	38%	57%	5%	1,002	telephone	All adults	
YouGov (for The Economist)	August 20–23, 2022	42%	52%	6%	1,318	online	Registered voters	
Ipsos (for Reuters)	August 22–23, 2022	41%	54%	5%	1,005	online	All adults	
Emerson College	August 23–24, 2022	42%	51%	7%	1,000	IVR/online	Registered voters	
YouGov (for CBS News)	August 24–26, 2022	45%	55%	0%	2,126	online	Registered voters	
YouGov (for The Economist)	August 28–30, 2022	41%	50%	9%	1,500	online	All adults	
Ipsos (for Reuters)	August 29–30, 2022	38%	58%	4%	1,005	online	All adults	

== September ==
Polling group	Date	Approve	Disapprove	Unsure	Sample size	Polling method	Segment polled	Source(s)
Ipsos (for Reuters)	September 6–7, 2022	39%	57%	4%	1,003	online	All adults	
Ipsos (for Reuters)	September 7–12, 2022	41%	54%	5%	4,411	online	All adults	
YouGov (for The Economist)	September 3–6, 2022	41%	51%	8%	1,500	online	All adults	
YouGov (for The Economist)	September 10–13, 2022	40%	52%	8%	1,500	online	All adults	
Ipsos (for Reuters)	September 12–13, 2022	39%	54%	7%	1,003	online	All adults	
Morning Consult (for Politico)	September 16–18, 2022	46%	52%	2%	2,005	online	Registered voters	
YouGov (for The Economist)	September 17–20, 2022	42%	51%	8%	1,500	online	All adults	
Rasmussen Reports/Pulse Opinion Research	September 18–20, 2022	46%	52%	2%	1,500	telephone/online	Likely voters	
Ipsos (for Reuters)	September 19–20, 2022	39%	57%	4%	1,004	online	All adults	
Emerson College	September 20–21, 2022	45%	49%	6%	1,368	IVR/online	Registered voters	
YouGov (for CBS News)	September 21–23, 2022	45%	55%	0%	2,253	online	Registered voters	
YouGov (for Yahoo ! News)	September 23–27, 2022	44%	53%	3%	1,138	online	Registered voters	
YouGov (for The Economist)	September 24–27, 2022	47%	52%	1%	1,055	online	Likely voters	
Ipsos (for Reuters)	September 26–27, 2022	41%	53%	6%	1,004	online	All adults	

== October ==
Polling group	Date	Approve	Disapprove	Unsure	Sample size	Polling method	Segment polled	Source(s)
Ipsos (for Reuters)	September 29 – October 3, 2022	41%	53%	6%	4,415	online	All adults	
YouGov (for The Economist)	October 1–4, 2022	49%	50%	1%	1,044	online	Likely voters	
Ipsos (for Reuters)	October 3–4, 2022	40%	53%	7%	1,003	online	All adults	
YouGov (for The Economist)	October 8–11, 2022	48%	51%	1%	1,030	online	Likely voters	
Ipsos (for Reuters)	October 10–11, 2022	40%	55%	5%	1,004	online	All adults	
YouGov (for The Economist)	October 12–14, 2022	48%	52%	0%	2,068	online	Likely voters	
YouGov (for Yahoo ! News)	October 13–17, 2022	47%	51%	2%	1,209	online	Registered voters	
YouGov (for The Economist)	October 22–25, 2022	45%	53%	2%	1,110	online	Likely voters	
Ipsos (for Reuters)	October 17–18, 2022	40%	54%	6%	1,002	online	All adults	
YouGov (for University of Massachusetts)	October 17–19, 2022	40%	52%	8%	1,000	online	All adults	
Emerson College	October 18–19, 2022	39%	53%	8%	1,000	IVR/online	Registered voters	
YouGov (for Vice News)	October 14–21, 2022	41%	52%	7%	3,000	online	All adults	
Ipsos (for Reuters)	October 18–24, 2022	40%	54%	6%	4,413	online	All adults	
YouGov (for The Economist)	October 22–25, 2022	46%	53%	1%	1,114	online	Likely voters	
Ipsos (for Reuters)	October 24–25, 2022	39%	55%	5%	1,005	online	All adults	
YouGov (for CBS News)	October 26–28, 2022	44%	56%	0%	2,119	online	Registered voters	
YouGov (for Yahoo ! News)	October 27–31, 2022	46%	52%	2%	1,172	online	Registered voters	

== November ==
Polling group	Date	Approve	Disapprove	Unsure	Sample size	Polling method	Segment polled	Source(s)
YouGov (for The Economist)	October 29 – November 1, 2022	45%	52%	3%	1,101	online	Likely voters	
Ipsos (for Reuters)	October 31 – November 1, 2022	40%	55%	5%	1,004	online	All adults	
YouGov (for The Economist)	November 3–6, 2022	46%	52%	2%	1,071	online	Likely voters	
Ipsos (for Reuters)	November 4–7, 2022	39%	57%	4%	1,004	online	All adults	
YouGov (for CBS News)	November 3–8, 2022	44%	56%	0%	3,933	IVR/online	Likely voters	
YouGov (for The Economist)	November 13–15, 2022	44%	53%	3%	1,287	online	Registered voters	
Ipsos (for Reuters)	November 14–15, 2022	37%	57%	6%	1,005	online	All adults	
Emerson College	November 18–19, 2022	39%	52%	9%	1,380	IVR/online	Registered voters	
YouGov (for The Economist)	November 19–22, 2022	46%	49%	5%	1,296	online	Registered voters	
Ipsos (for Reuters)	November 21–22, 2022	37%	57%	6%	1,002	online	All adults	
YouGov (for The Economist)	November 26–29, 2022	43%	53%	4%	1,319	online	Registered voters	
Ipsos (for Reuters)	November 28–29, 2022	40%	55%	5%	1,005	online	All adults	

== December ==
Polling group	Date	Approve	Disapprove	Unsure	Sample size	Polling method	Segment polled	Source(s)
YouGov (for The Economist)	December 3–6, 2022	42%	56%	2%	1,332	online	Registered voters	
Ipsos (for Reuters)	December 5–6, 2022	38%	56%	6%	1,004	online	All adults	
YouGov (for The Economist)	December 10–13, 2022	45%	50%	5%	1,338	online	Registered voters	
Ipsos (for Reuters)	December 12–13, 2022	39%	56%	5%	1,005	online	All adults	
YouGov (for Yahoo ! News)	December 15–19, 2022	45%	52%	3%	1,043	online	Registered voters	
YouGov (for The Economist)	December 17–20, 2022	47%	49%	4%	1,321	online	Registered voters	
Ipsos (for Reuters)	December 19–20, 2022	39%	55%	6%	1,004	online	All adults	

== By race ==
In December 2021 a PBS/Marist poll, found that just 33% of Hispanics approve of Biden, while 65% disapprove. In contrast, 40% of whites approve, while 56% disapprove.

In May 2022, a Quinnipiac poll found that Biden had an approval rating from Hispanics at 26%, White voters at 29%, and 63% from Black voters. In June 3–6, 2022, a Quinnipiac poll found that Biden had his then lowest approval rating from Hispanics at 24%, and 49% of Blacks.

On July 19, 2022, a Quinnipiac poll found that Biden had his lowest approval rating from Hispanics at 19%, while 70% disapprove.
