= Statewide opinion polling for the April 2012 Republican Party presidential primaries =

Republican presidential primaries, 2012
- Early – Mid 2012
- Leading Republican 2012 primary candidate by state (parentheses indicate a shared lead, italics indicates polling data, non-italics indicates a primary win). Stars indicate a completed primary. States in gray have no polling data or no relevant data due to a leading candidate having withdrawn or declined to enter the race. Mitt Romney 37+5 Rick Santorum 11 Newt Gingrich 2
Republican nominee before election
John McCain
Republican
Presumptive Republican nominee
Mitt Romney
Republican

This article contains opinion polling by U.S. state for the 2012 Republican Party presidential primaries.

As of May 2012, both Ron Paul and Mitt Romney have led polls in multiple states. They have both also reached at least 20 percent in polls in multiple states. Before announcing that they would not run, Mike Huckabee and Sarah Palin were also leading polls in multiple states with numbers above 20 percent. Michele Bachmann, Herman Cain, Rick Perry, and Rick Santorum were also able to lead polls in multiple states earlier in the race, but Cain suspended his campaign on December 3 after multiple allegations of sexual impropriety, Bachmann dropped out on January 4, one day after her poor showing in the Iowa caucuses, in which she came in sixth place and received just 5 percent of the vote, Perry dropped out on January 19 after finishing fifth in Iowa with just over 10 percent of the vote, finishing sixth in New Hampshire with less than 1 percent of the vote and with "lagging" poll numbers ahead of the South Carolina primary, and Santorum suspended his campaign on April 10. Newt Gingrich announced he would drop out of the race after a poor showing in the northeast on April 24.

Haley Barbour of Mississippi, Jeb Bush of Florida, Chris Christie of New Jersey, Jim DeMint of South Carolina, Bobby Jindal of Louisiana, Tim Pawlenty of Minnesota, Paul Ryan of Wisconsin and John Thune of South Dakota all succeeded in leading polls in their home states at some point in 2011, although only Pawlenty actually launched a campaign. Pawlenty exited the race on August 14, one day after finishing third in Iowa's Ames Straw Poll, citing a lack of campaign funds.

== Polling for completed primaries ==
=== Maryland (April 3) ===
Winner: Mitt Romney
Primary date: April 3, 2012
Delegates: 37

| Poll source | Date | 1st | 2nd | 3rd | Other |
|---|---|---|---|---|---|
| Primary results Turnout: 238,059 | April 3, 2012 | Mitt Romney 49.1% | Rick Santorum; 28.9% | Newt Gingrich; 10.9% | Ron Paul 9.5%, Others 1.5% |
| Public Policy Polling Margin of error: ±4.4% Sample size: 500 | Mar. 31 – Apr. 1, 2012 | Mitt Romney; 52% | Rick Santorum; 27% | Newt Gingrich; 10% | Ron Paul 9%, Someone else/Not sure 2% |
| Public Policy Polling Margin of error: ±4.4% Sample size: 500 | Mar. 31 – Apr. 1, 2012 | Mitt Romney; 51% | Rick Santorum; 33% | Ron Paul; 11% | Not sure 5% |
| Rasmussen Reports Margin of error: ±4.5% Sample size: 750 | Mar. 28, 2012 | Mitt Romney; 45% | Rick Santorum; 28% | Newt Gingrich; 12% | Ron Paul 7%, Some other candidate 2%, Undecided 6% |
| Rasmussen Reports Margin of error: ±4.5% Sample size: 750 | Mar. 28, 2012 | Mitt Romney; 53% | Rick Santorum; 39% | – | – |

=== Wisconsin (April 3) ===
Winner: Mitt Romney
Primary date: April 3, 2012
Delegates: 42

| Poll source | Date | 1st | 2nd | 3rd | Other |
|---|---|---|---|---|---|
| Primary results Turnout: 784,660 | April 3, 2012 | Mitt Romney 44.1% | Rick Santorum; 36.9% | Ron Paul; 11.2% | Newt Gingrich 5.9%, Others 2.0% |
| We Ask America Margin of error: ±2.86% Sample size: 1,173 | Apr. 1, 2012 | Mitt Romney; 39% | Rick Santorum; 31% | Ron Paul; 16% | Newt Gingrich 15% |
| Public Policy Polling Margin of error: ±4.0% Sample size: 609 | Mar. 31 – Apr. 1, 2012 | Mitt Romney; 43% | Rick Santorum; 36% | Ron Paul; 11% | Newt Gingrich 8%, Someone else/Not sure 2% |
| Public Policy Polling Margin of error: ±4.0% Sample size: 609 | Mar. 31 – Apr. 1, 2012 | Mitt Romney; 43% | Rick Santorum; 37% | Ron Paul; 16% | Not sure 4% |
| Rasmussen Reports Margin of error: ±4% Sample size: 717 | Mar. 29, 2012 | Mitt Romney; 44% | Rick Santorum; 34% | Ron Paul; 7% | Newt Gingrich 7%, Other 2%, Not sure 6% |
| St. Norbert College/Wisconsin Public Radio Margin of error: ±5% Sample size: 403 | Mar. 24–28, 2012 | Mitt Romney; 37% | Rick Santorum; 32% | Ron Paul; 8% | Newt Gingrich 4%, Other 5%, Not sure 11%, Refused 2% |
| NBC News/Marist Margin of error: ±3.6% Sample size: 740 | Mar. 26–27, 2012 | Mitt Romney; 40% | Rick Santorum; 33% | Ron Paul; 11% | Newt Gingrich 8%, Undecided 7% |
| NBC News/Marist Margin of error: ±3.6% Sample size: 740 | Mar. 26–27, 2012 | Mitt Romney; 46% | Rick Santorum; 41% | – | Other 1%, Undecided 12% |
| Marquette University Law School Margin of error: ±5.4% Sample size: 349 | Mar. 22–25, 2012 | Mitt Romney; 39% | Rick Santorum; 31% | Ron Paul; 11% | Newt Gingrich 5%, Don't know 12%, Refused 1% |
| Rasmussen Reports Margin of error: ±3% Sample size: 1,000 | Mar. 21, 2012 | Mitt Romney; 46% | Rick Santorum; 33% | Ron Paul; 8% | Newt Gingrich 7%, Some other candidate 1%, Undecided 5% |
| Rasmussen Reports Margin of error: ±3% Sample size: 1,000 | Mar. 21, 2012 | Mitt Romney; 51% | Rick Santorum; 40% | – | – |
| Public Policy Polling Margin of error: ±4.16% Sample size: 556 | Feb. 23–26, 2012 | Rick Santorum; 43% | Mitt Romney; 27% | Newt Gingrich; 10% | Ron Paul 8%, Someone else/Not sure 12% |
| Public Policy Polling Margin of error: ±4.16% Sample size: 556 | Feb. 23–26, 2012 | Rick Santorum; 51% | Mitt Romney; 28% | Ron Paul; 8% | Not sure 13% |
| Marquette University Law School Margin of error: ±4.9% Sample size: 424 | Feb. 16–19, 2012 | Rick Santorum; 34% | Mitt Romney; 18% | Ron Paul; 17% | Newt Gingrich 12%, Don't know 17%, Refused 1% |
| Public Policy Polling Margin of error: ±3.8% Sample size: 650 | Oct. 20–23, 2011 | Herman Cain; 30% | Mitt Romney; 18% | Newt Gingrich; 12% | Rick Perry 12%, Ron Paul 8%, Michele Bachmann 5%, Rick Santorum 2%, Jon Huntsman 1%, Gary Johnson 1%, someone else/undecided 12% |
| Public Policy Polling Margin of error: ±3.8% Sample size: 650 | Oct. 20–23, 2011 | Mitt Romney; 46% | Rick Perry; 34% | – | not sure 20% |
| Public Policy Polling Margin of error: ±3.8% Sample size: 650 | Oct. 20–23, 2011 | Herman Cain; 46% | Mitt Romney; 35% | – | not sure 19% |
| Public Policy Polling Margin of error: ±3.8% Sample size: 650 | Oct. 20–23, 2011 | Herman Cain; 49% | Rick Perry; 31% | – | not sure 21% |
| Public Policy Polling Margin of error: ±5.2% Sample size: 362 | Aug. 12–14, 2011 | Michele Bachmann; 20% | Rick Perry; 20% | Mitt Romney; 13% | Sarah Palin 11%, Herman Cain 7%, Newt Gingrich 6%, Ron Paul 6%, Tim Pawlenty 3%, Jon Huntsman 1%, someone else/undecided 12% |
| Public Policy Polling Margin of error: ±5.2% Sample size: 362 | Aug. 12–14, 2011 | Michele Bachmann; 24% | Rick Perry; 20% | Mitt Romney; 17% | Newt Gingrich 10%, Herman Cain 7%, Ron Paul 6%, Tim Pawlenty 4%, Jon Huntsman 1%, someone else/undecided 11% |
| Public Policy Polling Margin of error: ±3.8% Sample size: 666 | May 19–22, 2011 | Mitt Romney; 17% | Sarah Palin; 16% | Tim Pawlenty; 12% | Michele Bachmann 11%, Herman Cain 10%, Newt Gingrich 10%, Ron Paul 10%, Jon Huntsman 2%, someone else/not sure 14% |
| Public Policy Polling Margin of error: ±3.8% Sample size: 666 | May 19–22, 2011 | Mitt Romney; 19% | Tim Pawlenty; 15% | Michele Bachmann; 14% | Newt Gingrich 14%, Herman Cain 11%, Ron Paul 11%, Jon Huntsman 3%, someone else/not sure 14% |
| Public Policy Polling Margin of error: ±4.9% Sample size: 400 | Feb. 24–27, 2011 | Paul Ryan; 30% | Mike Huckabee; 17% | Newt Gingrich; 12% | Sarah Palin 9%, Mitt Romney 9%, Ron Paul 5%, Tim Pawlenty 4%, Mitch Daniels 3%, someone else/undecided 13% |
| Public Policy Polling Margin of error: ±4.9% Sample size: 400 | Feb. 24–27, 2011 | Mike Huckabee; 23% | Newt Gingrich; 15% | Sarah Palin; 15% | Mitt Romney 12%, Tim Pawlenty 10%, Ron Paul 5%, Mitch Daniels 3%, someone else/undecided 17% |
| Public Policy Polling Margin of error: ±4.9% Sample size: 400 | Dec. 10–12, 2010 | Sarah Palin; 21% | Mike Huckabee; 18% | Mitt Romney; 17% | Newt Gingrich 13%, Tim Pawlenty 10%, Ron Paul 4%, John Thune 3%, Mitch Daniels 2%, someone else/undecided 12% |
| Public Policy Polling Margin of error: ±4.1% Sample size: 579 | Oct. 26–28, 2010 | Sarah Palin; 18% | Mike Huckabee; 15% | Newt Gingrich; 14% | Mitt Romney 12%, Tim Pawlenty 8%, Mitch Daniels 2%, Mike Pence 2%, John Thune 1%, someone else/undecided 28% |
| Public Policy Polling Margin of error: ±4.9% Sample size: 400 | Mar. 20–21, 2010 | Mitt Romney; 32% | Sarah Palin; 27% | Mike Huckabee; 23% | undecided 18% |

=== Connecticut (April 24) ===
Winner: Mitt Romney
Primary date: April 24, 2012
Delegates: 28

| Poll source | Date | 1st | 2nd | 3rd | Other |
|---|---|---|---|---|---|
| Quinnipiac; Margin of error: ±4.7% Sample size: 429 | Mar. 14–19, 2012 | Mitt Romney; 42% | Rick Santorum; 19% | Newt Gingrich; 13% | Ron Paul 9%, Won't vote 3%, Don't know/No answer 14% |
| Public Policy Polling; Margin of error: ±4.9% Sample size: 400 | Sep. 22–25, 2011 | Mitt Romney; 25% | Rick Perry; 18% | Herman Cain; 10% | Newt Gingrich 10%, Ron Paul 10%, Michele Bachmann 8%, Jon Huntsman 3%, Rick Santorum 3%, Gary Johnson 1%, someone else/not sure 12% |
| Public Policy Polling; Margin of error: ±4.9% Sample size: 400 | Sep. 22–25, 2011 | Mitt Romney; 45% | Rick Perry; 36% | – | not sure 19% |
| Quinnipiac; Margin of error: ±5.4% Sample size: 332 | Sep. 8–13, 2011 | Mitt Romney; 37% | Rick Perry; 19% | Michele Bachmann; 8% | Sarah Palin 4%, Herman Cain 3%, Newt Gingrich 3%, Ron Paul 3%, Jon Huntsman 2%, Rick Santorum 1%, Thaddeus McCotter 0%, someone else/undecided 20% |
| Public Policy Polling; Margin of error: ±7.3% Sample size: 180 | Oct. 27–29, 2010 | Mitt Romney; 28% | Mike Huckabee; 15% | Newt Gingrich; 14% | Sarah Palin 11%, Tim Pawlenty 5%, Mike Pence 5%, Mitch Daniels 4%, John Thune 2%, someone else/undecided 18 |

=== New York (April 24) ===
Winner: Mitt Romney
Primary date: April 24, 2012
Delegates: 95

| Poll source | Date | 1st | 2nd | 3rd | Other |
|---|---|---|---|---|---|
| Siena College Research Institute Margin of error: ±6.6% Sample size: 218 | Apr. 1–4, 2012 | Mitt Romney; 51% | Rick Santorum; 18% | Ron Paul; 11% | Newt Gingrich 6%, Don't know/No opinion 14% |
| Quinnipiac Margin of error: ±5.1% Sample size: 372 | Mar. 28 – Apr. 2, 2012 | Mitt Romney; 54% | Rick Santorum; 21% | Newt Gingrich; 9% | Ron Paul 8%, Don't know/No answer 8% |
| Siena College Research Institute Margin of error: ±6.5% Sample size: 230 | Feb. 26–29, 2012 | Mitt Romney; 38% | Rick Santorum; 23% | Newt Gingrich; 13% | Ron Paul 11%, Don't know/No opinion 14% |
| Quinnipiac Margin of error: ±4.9% Sample size: 399 | Feb. 8–13, 2012 | Mitt Romney; 32% | Rick Santorum; 20% | Ron Paul; 14% | Newt Gingrich 10% |
| Siena College Research Institute Margin of error: ±3.4% Sample size: 807 | Jan. 29 – Feb. 1, 2012 | Mitt Romney; 31% | Newt Gingrich; 29% | Ron Paul; 16% | Rick Santorum 13%, Don't know 10% |
| Siena College Research Institute Margin of error: ±3.5% Sample size: 803 | Nov. 8–10, 13, 2011 | Mitt Romney; 32% | Herman Cain; 15% | Newt Gingrich; 12% | Michele Bachmann 9%, Ron Paul 9%, Rick Perry 9%, Don't know 15% |

=== Pennsylvania (April 24) ===
Winner: Mitt Romney
Primary date: April 24, 2012
Delegates: 72

| Poll source | Date | 1st | 2nd | 3rd | Other |
|---|---|---|---|---|---|
| American Research Group Margin of error: ±4% Sample size: 600 | Apr. 9–10, 2012 | Mitt Romney; 44% | Rick Santorum; 40% | Newt Gingrich; 7% | Ron Paul 5%, Other 1%, Undecided 3% |
| Rasmussen Reports Margin of error: ±4% Sample size: 750 | Apr. 4, 2012 | Rick Santorum; 42% | Mitt Romney; 38% | Ron Paul; 7% | Newt Gingrich 6%, Some other candidate 2%, Undecided 5% |
| Rasmussen Reports Margin of error: ±4% Sample size: 750 | Apr. 4, 2012 | Rick Santorum; 46% | Mitt Romney; 44% | – | – |
| Public Policy Polling Margin of error: ±4.9% Sample size: 403 | Apr. 4, 2012 | Mitt Romney; 42% | Rick Santorum; 37% | Ron Paul; 9% | Newt Gingrich 6%, Someone else/Not sure 6% |
| Public Policy Polling Margin of error: ±4.9% Sample size: 403 | Apr. 4, 2012 | Rick Santorum; 42% | Mitt Romney; 41% | Ron Paul; 12% | Not sure 6% |
| Quinnipiac Margin of error: ±3.9% Sample size: 647 | Mar. 27 – Apr. 1, 2012 | Rick Santorum; 41% | Mitt Romney; 35% | Ron Paul; 10% | Newt Gingrich 7%, Don't know/No answer 6% |
| Mercyhurst University Margin of error: ±4.75% Sample size: 425 | Mar. 19–30, 2012 | Rick Santorum; 37% | Mitt Romney; 31% | Ron Paul; 10% | Newt Gingrich 9%, Other 4%, Don't know 6%, Refused 2% |
| Franklin & Marshall College Margin of error: ±4.2% Sample size: 505 | Mar. 20–25, 2012 | Rick Santorum; 30% | Mitt Romney; 28% | Ron Paul; 9% | Newt Gingrich 6%, Don't know 24%, Other 3% |
| Quinnipiac Margin of error: ±4.4% Sample size: 508 | Mar. 7–12, 2012 | Rick Santorum; 36% | Mitt Romney; 22% | Ron Paul; 12% | Newt Gingrich 8%, Someone else 2%, Wouldn't vote 3%, Don't know/No answer 18% |
| Quinnipiac Margin of error: ±4.4% Sample size: 508 | Mar. 7–12, 2012 | Rick Santorum; 52% | Mitt Romney; 32% | – | Don't know/No answer 16% |
| Public Policy Polling Margin of error: ±4.1% Sample size: 564 | Mar. 8–11, 2012 | Rick Santorum; 43% | Mitt Romney; 25% | Newt Gingrich; 13% | Ron Paul 9%, Someone else/Not sure 10% |
| Public Policy Polling Margin of error: ±4.1% Sample size: 564 | Mar. 8–11, 2012 | Rick Santorum; 51% | Mitt Romney; 28% | Ron Paul; 12% | Not sure 9% |
| Franklin & Marshall College Margin of error: ±5.9% Sample size: 278 | Feb. 14–20, 2012 | Rick Santorum; 45% | Mitt Romney; 16% | Newt Gingrich; 9% | Ron Paul 7%, Other 1%, Don't know 22% |
| Susquehanna Polling and Research Margin of error: ±4.38% Sample size: 500 | Feb. 2–6, 2012 | Rick Santorum; 30% | Mitt Romney; 29% | Newt Gingrich; 13% | Ron Paul 9%, Other 2%, Undecided 16% |
| Susquehanna Polling and Research Margin of error: ±2.95% Sample size: 1,106 | Dec. 7–11, 2011 | Newt Gingrich; 35% | Mitt Romney; 18% | Rick Santorum; 18% | Ron Paul 8%, Michele Bachmann 6%, Rick Perry 2%, undecided 14% |
| Quinnipiac Margin of error: ±4.1% Sample size: 578 | Nov. 28 – Dec. 5, 2011 | Newt Gingrich; 31% | Mitt Romney; 17% | Rick Santorum; 9% | Ron Paul 7%, Michele Bachmann 3%, Herman Cain 3%, Jon Huntsman 3%, Rick Perry 3%, Someone Else 2%, Wouldn't Vote 4%, Don't Know/No Answer 18% |
| Quinnipiac Margin of error: ±4.1% Sample size: 578 | Nov. 28 – Dec. 5, 2011 | Newt Gingrich; 50% | Mitt Romney; 31% | – | Someone Else 3%, Wouldn't Vote 5%, Don't Know/No Answer 11% |
| Public Policy Polling Margin of error: ±4.9% Sample size: 400 | Nov. 17–20, 2011 | Newt Gingrich; 32% | Herman Cain; 15% | Mitt Romney; 12% | Rick Santorum 12%, Ron Paul 9%, Michele Bachmann 5%, Jon Huntsman 3%, Rick Perry 3%, Gary Johnson 0%, someone else/not sure 9% |
| Quinnipiac Margin of error: ±4.1% Sample size: 579 | Oct. 31 – Nov. 7, 2011 | Herman Cain; 17% | Mitt Romney; 17% | Newt Gingrich; 13% | Rick Santorum 13%, Ron Paul 5%, Rick Perry 5%, Michele Bachmann 2%, Jon Huntsman 2%, don't know 21%, someone else 2%, wouldn't vote 2% |
| Quinnipiac Margin of error: ±4.2% Sample size: 541 | Sep. 21–26, 2011 | Mitt Romney; 18% | Rick Perry; 16% | Rick Santorum; 12% | Sarah Palin 8%, Michele Bachmann 6%, Herman Cain 5%, Ron Paul 5%, Newt Gingrich 4%, Jon Huntsman 2%, don't know 19%, someone else 2%, wouldn't vote 2% |
| Public Policy Polling Margin of error: ±5.1% Sample size: 376 | Jun. 30 – Jul. 5, 2011 | Michele Bachmann; 24% | Mitt Romney; 17% | Rick Santorum; 14% | Herman Cain 10%, Ron Paul 9%, Rick Perry 8%, Newt Gingrich 6%, Jon Huntsman 3%, Tim Pawlenty 1%, someone else/not sure 8% |
| Public Policy Polling Margin of error: ±5.1% Sample size: 376 | Jun. 30 – Jul. 5, 2011 | Michele Bachmann; 27% | Mitt Romney; 20% | Ron Paul; 10% | Rick Perry 10%, Herman Cain 9%, Newt Gingrich 9%, Jon Huntsman 3%, Tim Pawlenty 2%, someone else/not sure 11% |
| Public Policy Polling Margin of error: ±5.1% Sample size: 376 | Jun. 30 – Jul. 5, 2011 | Michele Bachmann; 23% | Sarah Palin; 18% | Mitt Romney; 14% | Rick Perry 11%, Herman Cain 7%, Ron Paul 7%, Newt Gingrich 5%, Jon Huntsman 3%, Tim Pawlenty 3%, someone else/not sure 8% |
| Quinnipiac Margin of error: ±4.3% Sample size: 523 | Jun. 7–12, 2011 | Mitt Romney; 21% | Rick Santorum; 16% | Sarah Palin; 11% | Herman Cain 8%, Ron Paul 6%, Michele Bachmann 5% Newt Gingrich 5%, Tim Pawlenty 4%, Jon Huntsman 1%, Gary Johnson <1% |
| Public Policy Polling Margin of error: ±4.9% Sample size: 400 | Jan. 3–5, 2011 | Mike Huckabee; 21% | Sarah Palin; 18% | Newt Gingrich; 16% | Mitt Romney 14%, Rick Santorum 11%, Tim Pawlenty 6%, Ron Paul 4%, Mitch Daniels 1%, undecided 8% |
| Public Policy Polling Margin of error: ±4.9% Sample size: 400 | Jan. 3–5, 2011 | Mike Huckabee; 26% | Sarah Palin; 21% | Mitt Romney; 16% | Newt Gingrich 15%, Tim Pawlenty 6%, Ron Paul 5%, Mitch Daniels 2%, undecided 9% |
| Public Policy Polling Margin of error: ±5.8% Sample size: 283 | Oct. 30–31, 2010 | Mike Huckabee; 23% | Sarah Palin; 16% | Mitt Romney; 16% | Newt Gingrich 15%, Mitch Daniels 2%, Tim Pawlenty 2%, Mike Pence 2%, John Thune 1%, someone else/undecided 22% |
| Public Policy Polling Margin of error: ±4.9% Sample size: 400 | Aug. 14–16, 2010 | Mike Huckabee; 17% | Sarah Palin; 17% | Mitt Romney; 16% | Rick Santorum 15%, Newt Gingrich 14%, Ron Paul 6%, undecided 17% |
| Public Policy Polling Margin of error: ±4.9% Sample size: 400 | Aug. 14–16, 2010 | Mitt Romney; 20% | Newt Gingrich; 19% | Mike Huckabee; 19% | Sarah Palin 19%, Ron Paul 8%, undecided 12%, someone else 4% |
| Public Policy Polling Margin of error: ±5.0% Sample size: 400 | Jun. 19–21, 2010 | Sarah Palin; 24% | Newt Gingrich; 23% | Mike Huckabee; 20% | Mitt Romney 16%, Ron Paul 11%, undecided 6% |
| Public Policy Polling Margin of error: ±4.9% Sample size: 405 | Mar. 29–Apr. 1, 2010 | Mitt Romney; 31% | Mike Huckabee; 27% | Sarah Palin; 27% | undecided 15% |

=== Rhode Island (April 24) ===
Winner: Mitt Romney
Primary date: April 24, 2012
Delegates: 19

| Poll source | Date | 1st | 2nd | 3rd | Other |
|---|---|---|---|---|---|
| Public Policy Polling Margin of error: ±6.2% Sample size: 250 | Feb. 16–22, 2011 | Mitt Romney; 39% | Mike Huckabee; 15% | Newt Gingrich; 13% | Sarah Palin 10%, Ron Paul 5%, Tim Pawlenty 5%, Mitch Daniels 4%, John Thune 1%, someone else/undecided 9% |

== See also ==
- Results of the 2012 Republican Party presidential primaries
- Straw polls for the Republican Party presidential primaries, 2012
- Nationwide opinion polling for the Republican Party 2012 presidential primaries
