= 2023 opinion polling on the Biden administration =

Surveying on 2021–2025 US presidency

This is a list of opinion polls taken on the presidency of Joe Biden in 2023. To navigate between years, see opinion polling on the Biden administration. For 2024–2025 opinion polling, see 2024–2025 opinion polling on the Biden administration.

According to analysis by Gallup, Biden's average approval rating in 2023 was 39.8%. Compared with presidents going back to Dwight D. Eisenhower, the Gallup Poll only recorded one president, Jimmy Carter, as having a lower average approval rating in their third year (37.4%). Notably, this is the first year in which Joe Biden's average approval rating was lower than his predecessor's at the same point in their terms (Donald Trump's average in 2019 was 42.0%). Biden's low approval ratings in 2023 were attributed to continued disapproval over the economy, immigration, and Biden's age as well as his response to the outbreak of the Gaza war in October.

== January ==
Polling group	Date	Approve	Disapprove	Unsure	Sample size	Polling method	Segment polled	Ref.
YouGov (for CBS News)	January 4–6, 2023	44%	56%	0%	2,144	online	All adults	
YouGov (for The Economist)	January 8–10, 2023	47%	45%	7%	1,500	online	All adults	
Quinnipiac University	January 11–15, 2023	38%	53%	9%	1,466	telephone	Registered voters	
Ipsos	January 13–15, 2023	40%	53%	7%	1,035	online	All adults	
Harris (for Harvard University)	January 18–19, 2023	42%	56%	2%	2,050	online	Registered voters	
Emerson College	January 19–21, 2023	44%	48%	8%	1,015	IVR/online	Registered voters	
Marist College	January 23–26, 2023	42%	49%	9%	1,327	telephone/online	All adults	
YouGov (for The Economist)	January 29–31, 2023	41%	52%	7%	1,319	online	Registered voters	
Monmouth University	January 26–30, 2023	43%	48%	9%	805	telephone	All adults	

== February ==
Polling group	Date	Approve	Disapprove	Unsure	Sample size	Polling method	Segment polled	Ref.
YouGov (for CBS News)	February 1–4, 2023	45%	55%	0%	2,030	online	All adults	
Ipsos (for Reuters)	February 3–5, 2023	41%	52%	7%	1,029	online	All adults	
Quinnipiac University	February 9–14, 2023	40%	55%	5%	1,429	telephone	Registered voters	
Marist College (for NPR & PBS)	February 13–16, 2023	46%	46%	8%	1,352	telephone/online	All adults	
Harris (for Harvard University)	February 15–16, 2023	42%	55%	3%	1,838	online	Registered voters	
YouGov (for The Economist)	February 20–21, 2023	44%	50%	6%	1,500	online	All adults	
Emerson College	February 24–25, 2023	44%	50%	6%	1,060	IVR/online	Registered voters	

== March ==
Polling group	Date	Approve	Disapprove	Unsure	Sample size	Polling method	Segment polled	Ref.
Ipsos (for Reuters)	March 3–5, 2023	42%	52%	6%	1,023	online	All adults	
Quinnipiac University	March 9–13, 2023	39%	55%	6%	1,600	telephone	Registered voters	
Monmouth University	March 16–20, 2023	41%	51%	8%	805	telephone	All adults	
YouGov (for The Economist)	March 19–21, 2023	43%	51%	6%	1,500	online	All adults	
YouGov (for CBS News)	March 20–22, 2023	45%	55%	0%	2,117	online	All adults	
Marist College (for NPR & PBS)	March 20–23, 2023	42%	49%	9%	1,327	telephone/online	All adults	
Harris (for Harvard University)	March 22–23, 2023	43%	55%	2%	2,905	online	Registered voters	
Quinnipiac University	March 23–27, 2023	38%	57%	5%	1,635	telephone	Registered voters	
Investor's Business Daily/TIPP	March 29–31, 2023	45%	45%	10%	1,365	online	All adults	

== April ==
Polling group	Date	Approve	Disapprove	Unsure	Sample size	Polling method	Segment polled	Ref.
YouGov (for The Economist)	April 1–4, 2023	44%	50%	6%	1,500	online	All adults	
YouGov (for CBS News)	April 12–14, 2023	43%	57%	0%	2,065	online	All adults	
Harris (for Harvard University)	April 18–19, 2023	43%	54%	3%	1,845	online	Registered voters	
Ipsos (for Reuters)	April 21–24, 2023	41%	54%	5%	1,005	online	All adults	
YouGov (for The Economist)	April 22–25, 2023	47%	48%	6%	1,500	online	All adults	
Emerson College	April 24–25, 2023	41%	49%	10%	1,100	IVR/online	Registered voters	

== May ==
Polling group	Date	Approve	Disapprove	Unsure	Sample size	Polling method	Segment polled	Ref.
YouGov (for The Economist)	April 29–May 2, 2023	44%	49%	7%	1,500	online	All adults	
Investor's Business Daily/TIPP	May 3–5, 2023	43%	49%	8%	1,480	online	All adults	
Ipsos (for Reuters)	May 5–7, 2023	40%	54%	6%	1,022	online	All adults	
YouGov (for Yahoo! News)	May 5–8, 2023	43%	48%	9%	1,584	online	All adults	
Harris (for Harvard University)	May 17–18, 2023	43%	54%	3%	2,004	online	Registered voters	
YouGov (for CBS News)	May 17–19, 2023	41%	59%	0%	2,188	online	All adults	
Quinnipiac University	May 18–22, 2023	39%	54%	4%	1,635	telephone	Registered voters	
Monmouth University	May 18–23, 2023	41%	53%	6%	981	telephone	All adults	

== June ==
Polling group	Date	Approve	Disapprove	Unsure	Sample size	Polling method	Segment polled	Ref.
Investor's Business Daily/TIPP	May 31–June 2, 2023	40%	51%	9%	1,358	online	All adults	
Ipsos (for Reuters)	June 2–5, 2023	41%	54%	5%	1,056	online	All adults	
YouGov (for The Economist)	June 3–6, 2023	44%	53%	6%	1,315	online	Registered voters	
YouGov (for CBS News)	June 7–10, 2023	41%	59%	0%	2,480	online	All adults	
Quinnipiac University	June 8–12, 2023	42%	54%	2%	1,735	telephone	Registered voters	
Harris (for Harvard University)	June 14–15, 2023	43%	53%	4%	2,090	online	Registered voters	
Emerson College	June 19–20, 2023	41%	51%	8%	1,105	IVR/online	Registered voters	

== July ==
Polling group	Date	Approve	Disapprove	Unsure	Sample size	Polling method	Segment polled	Ref.
YouGov (for The Economist)	July 1–5, 2023	38%	55%	7%	1,350	online	Registered voters	
Redfield & Wilton Strategies	July 6, 2023	40%	48%	12%	1,500	online	Registered voters	
Investor's Business Daily/TIPP	July 5–7, 2023	38%	51%	13%	1,341	online	All adults	
Ipsos (for Reuters)	July 7–9, 2023	40%	54%	6%	1,028	online	All adults	
YouGov (for The Economist)	July 8–11, 2023	39%	56%	5%	1,500	online	All adults	
Marquette University Law School	July 7–12, 2023	42%	57%	1%	1,005	online	All adults	
Monmouth University	July 12–17, 2023	44%	52%	4%	910	telephone	All adults	
Quinnipiac University	July 13–17, 2023	40%	53%	3%	1,809	telephone	Registered voters	
Harris (for Harvard University)	July 19–20, 2023	42%	55%	3%	2,068	online	Registered voters	
YouGov (for The Economist)	July 22–25, 2023	45%	52%	5%	1,306	online	Registered voters	
YouGov (for CBS News)	Jul 26–28, 2023	40%	60%	0%	2,181	online	All adults	

== August ==
Polling group	Date	Approve	Disapprove	Unsure	Sample size	Polling method	Segment polled	Ref.
Ipsos (for Reuters)	July 28 – August 1, 2023	40%	55%	5%	2,009	online	All adults	
YouGov (for The Economist)	July 29 – August 1, 2023	40%	56%	4%	1,500	online	All adults	
Noble Perspective Insights/The Center Square	July 31 – August 3, 2023	40%	54%	6%	2,500	online	Registered voters	
Investor's Business Daily/TIPP	August 2–4, 2023	38%	51%	11%	1,369	online	All adults	
Ipsos (for Reuters)	August 4–6, 2023	40%	54%	6%	1,032	online	All adults	
YouGov (for The Economist)	August 5–8, 2023	41%	53%	6%	1,500	online	All adults	
AP-NORC	August 10–14, 2023	42%	57%		1,165	online/phone	All adults	
Quinnipiac University	August 10–14, 2023	37%	56%	7%	1,818	phone	All adults	
Léger	August 11–14, 2023	43%	54%	3%	1,002	online	All adults	
Marist College	August 11–14, 2023	42%	52%	6%	1,100	online/phone	Registered voters	
YouGov (for The Economist)	August 12–15, 2023	40%	53%	7%	1,500	online	All adults	
Emerson College	August 16–17, 2023	42%	47%	11%	1,000	online/phone	Registered voters	
YouGov (for Yahoo! News)	August 17–21, 2023	41%	54%	6%	1,665	online	All adults	
YouGov (for The Economist)	August 19–22, 2023	41%	54%	5%	1,500	online	All adults	
Gallup	August 1–23, 2023	42%	53%	5%	1,014	phone	All adults	
Public Policy Polling (for Congressional Integrity Project)	August 23–24, 2023	44%	50%	6%	606	phone	Registered voters	
SurveyMonkey (for CNBC)	August 21–25, 2023	41%	56%		4,324	online	All adults	
NewsNation/Decision Desk HQ	August 24–25, 2023	48%	52%		1,000		Registered voters	
HarrisX/The Messenger	August 24–26, 2023	43%	54%	3%	2,013	online	Registered voters	
Emerson College	August 25–26, 2023	43%	47%		1,000	online/phone	Registered voters	
YouGov (for The Economist)	August 26–29, 2023	38%	55%	6%	1,500	online	All adults	
Fabrizio, Lee & Associates/GBAO (for The Wall Street Journal)	August 24–30, 2023	42%	57%		1,500	phone	Registered voters	
The 19th/SurveyMonkey	August 24–31, 2023	41%	56%		20,191	online	All adults	
SSRS/CNN	August 25–31, 2023	39%	61%	0%	1,503	online/phone	All adults	
Echelon Insights	August 28–31, 2023	41%	57%	2%	1,022	online	Likely voters	

== September ==
Polling group	Date	Approve	Disapprove	Unsure	Sample size	Polling method	Segment polled	Ref.
YouGov (for The Economist)	September 2–5, 2023	41%	53%	6%	1,500	online	All adults	
YouGov (for CBS News)	September 5–8, 2023	40%	60%	0%	2,335	online	All adults	
YouGov (for Yahoo! News)	September 14–18, 2023	42%	55%	3%	1,097	online	Registered voters	

== October ==
Polling group	Date	Approve	Disapprove	Unsure	Sample size	Polling method	Segment polled	Ref.
YouGov (for The Economist)	September 30 – October 3, 2023	40%	55%	5%	1,500	online	All adults	
YouGov (for Yahoo! News)	October 12–16, 2023	42%	55%	3%	1,123	online	Registered voters	
YouGov (for CBS News)	October 16–19, 2023	40%	60%	0%	1,878	online	All adults	

== November ==
Polling group	Date	Approve	Disapprove	Unsure	Sample size	Polling method	Segment polled	Ref.
YouGov (for The Economist)	November 5–7, 2023	40%	54%	6%	1,500	online	All adults	
YouGov (for Yahoo! News)	November 9–13, 2023	40%	58%	2%	1,062	online	Registered voters	

== December ==
Polling group	Date	Approve	Disapprove	Unsure	Sample size	Polling method	Segment polled	Ref.
YouGov (for CBS News)	December 6–8, 2023	41%	59%	0%	2,144	online	All adults	
YouGov (for The Economist)	December 9–12, 2023	39%	55%	6%	1,500	online	All adults	

== Biden job approval by race ==
=== With White Americans ===
July 2025
Poll source	Date	Sample size (Note: Key: A – all adults RV – registered voters LV – likely voters V – unclear)	MoE	Approve	Disapprove	Unsure/ Other	Net
The Economist/YouGov	January 29–31, 2023			35%	61%	4%	−26%
The Economist/YouGov	February 20–21, 2023			39%	57%	4%	−18%
The Economist/YouGov	April 1–4, 2023			41%	56%	3%	−15%
The Economist/YouGov	June 3–6, 2023			38%	59%	4%	−21%
The Economist/YouGov	July 1–5, 2023			35%	61%	4%	−26%
The Economist/YouGov	July 22–25, 2023			38%	60%	3%	−22%

=== With Black Americans ===
July 2025
Poll source	Date	Sample size	MoE	Approve	Disapprove	Unsure/ Other	Net
The Economist/YouGov	January 29–31, 2023			68%	20%	13%	+48%
The Economist/YouGov	February 20–21, 2023			70%	19%	11%	+50%
The Economist/YouGov	April 1–4, 2023			71%	21%	8%	+50%
The Economist/YouGov	June 3–6, 2023			64%	28%	8%	+36%
The Economist/YouGov	July 1–5, 2023			62%	29%	9%	+33%
The Economist/YouGov	July 22–25, 2023			68%	22%	9%	+46%

=== With Hispanic Americans ===
July 2025
Poll source	Date	Sample size	MoE	Approve	Disapprove	Unsure/ Other	Net
The Economist/YouGov	January 29–31, 2023			48%	39%	13%	+9%
The Economist/YouGov	February 20–21, 2023			45%	46%	9%	−1%
The Economist/YouGov	April 1–4, 2023			37%	50%	13%	−13%
The Economist/YouGov	June 3–6, 2023			37%	51%	12%	−14%
The Economist/YouGov	July 1–5, 2023			35%	49%	16%	−14%
The Economist/YouGov	July 22–25, 2023			45%	49%	6%	−4%
