= 2024 United States presidential election in Florida =

- November 5, 2024
- Turnout: 78.9% (of active registered voters) ▲1.73 pp 66.7% (of estimated voting-eligible population)

Nominee	Donald Trump	Kamala Harris
Party	Republican	Democratic
Home state	Florida	California
Running mate	JD Vance	Tim Walz
Electoral vote	30	0
Popular vote	6,110,125	4,683,038
Percentage	56.09%	42.99%

Trump
40–50%
50–60%
60–70%
70–80%
80–90%
90–100%
Harris
40–50%
50–60%
60–70%
70–80%
80–90%
90–100%
Tie/No data
President before election
Joe Biden
Democratic
Elected President
Donald Trump
Republican

The 2024 United States presidential election in Florida was held on Tuesday, November 5, 2024, as part of the 2024 United States presidential election in which all 50 states plus the District of Columbia participated. Florida voters chose electors to represent them in the Electoral College via a popular vote. The state of Florida has 30 electoral votes in the Electoral College, following reapportionment due to the 2020 United States census in which the state gained a seat. This gave Florida the third-most electoral votes in the country, which marked the first time it carried more weight than New York (28 electoral votes) in a presidential election.

A heavily populated South Atlantic state, Florida had previously been considered a crucial swing state and a bellwether in past elections, but has shifted significantly to the political right since the 2022 gubernatorial election where incumbent Governor Ron DeSantis won re-election with a 19.4% margin of victory. Trump's double-digit margin of victory solidified Florida further as a safe red state. Florida has two large distinct cultural areas: North Florida and the Florida Panhandle are part of the conservative Deep South, and South Florida has a heavy Latin American influence with large Catholic Cuban, Haitian, Nicaraguan, and Venezuelan populations in the Miami metropolitan area.

Trump defeated Harris in Florida by 13.1 percentage points, the biggest margin of victory for a candidate and the first double-digit win at the presidential level in the state since 1988. Trump won all three of the state's majority-Hispanic counties. Per exit polls, Trump won 63% of White voters, 58% of Hispanic voters of whom he won 70% of Cuban voters, and 15% of Black voters in the state. All 67 counties in Florida shifted to the right compared to 2020. Trump was the first candidate to receive more than 6 million votes in Florida.

== Primary elections ==
=== Republican primary ===
The Florida Republican primary was held on March 19, 2024, alongside primaries in Arizona, Illinois, and Ohio.

Florida Republican primary, March 19, 2024
Candidate	Votes	Percentage	Actual delegate count		
Candidate	Votes	Percentage	Bound	Unbound	Total
Donald Trump	911,424	81.19%	125	0	125
Nikki Haley (withdrawn)	155,560	13.86%	0	0	0
Ron DeSantis (withdrawn)	41,269	3.68%	0	0	0
Chris Christie (withdrawn)	8,953	0.80%	0	0	0
Vivek Ramaswamy (withdrawn)	2,850	0.25%	0	0	0
Ryan Binkley (withdrawn)	1,385	0.12%	0	0	0
Asa Hutchinson (withdrawn)	1,190	0.11%	0	0	0
Total:	1,122,631	100.00%	125	0	125

=== Democratic primary ===
On November 30, 2023, Politico reported that the Florida Democratic Party had only submitted incumbent president Joe Biden's name to the Secretary of State, which meant that the primary would be cancelled under Florida law, and resulting in all the state's pledged delegates being awarded to Biden. This cancellation was criticized by the Dean Phillips and Marianne Williamson campaigns. Williamson and fellow Democratic candidate Cenk Uygur held a press conference over Zoom on December 1 criticizing the move. On December 11, 2023, a voter filed a lawsuit in federal court seeking to add Phillips's, Williamson's, and Uygur's names to the ballot. The voter lost in district court.

==== Winner of delegates ====
- Vice-President Kamala Harris (previously pledged to President Joe Biden)

==== Endorsements ====
Joe Biden (withdrawn)

U.S. representatives

- Sheila Cherfilus-McCormick, FL-20 (2022–2026)
- Val Demings, FL-10 (2017–2023), chief of the Orlando Police Department (2007–2011), nominee for U.S. senator from Florida in 2022
- Maxwell Frost, (Note: Biden-Harris Campaign National Advisory Board member) FL-10 (2023–present)
- Darren Soto, FL-09 (2017–present)
- Debbie Wasserman Schultz, FL-25 (2023–present), FL-23 (2013–2023), FL-20 (2005–2013), former chair of the Democratic National Committee (2011–2016)

State legislators

- Shevrin Jones, Florida state senator from the 35th district (2020–present), state representative from the 101st district (2012–2020)

==== Hypothetical polling ====
Hypothetical polling

Poll source	Date(s) administered	Sample size (Note: Key: A – all adults RV – registered voters LV – likely voters V – unclear)	Margin of error	Joe Biden	Hillary Clinton	Kamala Harris	Gavin Newsom	Undecided
Suffolk University	September 15–18, 2022	163 (LV)	–	50%	–	–	33%	17%
Suffolk University	January 26–29, 2022	164 (LV)	–	43%	46%	–	–	11% (Note: "Refused" with 1%)
Victory Insights	September 16–18, 2021	200 (LV)	–	60%	–	17%	–	23% (Note: "Someone else" with 23%)

== General election ==
=== Trump assassination attempt ===
On September 15, 2024, Trump survived an assassination attempt while golfing at Trump International Golf Club in West Palm Beach, Florida. 58-year-old Ryan Wesley Routh was spotted hiding in nearby shrubbery while aiming a rifle at a member of Trump's security detail. A Secret Service agent fired upon Routh, who fled the scene and was later captured in Martin County. The incident occurred two months after Trump survived a previous assassination attempt while speaking at a campaign rally near Butler, Pennsylvania.

=== Candidates ===
The following presidential candidates received ballot access in Florida:

- Kamala Harris, Democratic Party
- Donald Trump, Republican Party
- Chase Oliver, Libertarian Party
- Jill Stein, Green Party
- Claudia De la Cruz, Party for Socialism and Liberation
- Randall Terry, Constitution Party
- Peter Sonski, American Solidarity Party
- Shiva Ayyadurai, Independent (write-in)
- Cherunda Fox (write-in)

In addition, Robert F. Kennedy Jr. withdrew his name from the ballot after he suspended his campaign.

=== Predictions ===
Source	Ranking	As of
The Cook Political Report	Likely R	August 27, 2024
Inside Elections	Lean R	August 29, 2024
Sabato's Crystal Ball	Likely R	August 20, 2024
Decision Desk HQ/The Hill	Likely R	October 21, 2024
CNalysis	Likely R	November 4, 2024
CNN	Lean R	September 1, 2024
The Economist	Likely R	June 12, 2024
538	Likely R	October 8, 2024
NBC News	Likely R	October 6, 2024
YouGov	Lean R	October 16, 2024
Split Ticket	Likely R	November 1, 2024

=== Polling ===
Donald Trump vs. Kamala Harris

Aggregate polls

Source of poll aggregation	Dates administered	Dates updated	Kamala Harris Democratic	Donald Trump Republican	Undecided (Note: Calculated by taking the difference of 100% and all other candidates combined.)	Margin
270ToWin	October 23 – November 4, 2024	November 4, 2024	44.6%	51.1%	4.3%	Trump +6.5%
538	through November 4, 2024	November 4, 2024	44.6%	51.2%	4.2%	Trump +6.6%
Silver Bulletin	through November 3, 2024	November 3, 2024	44.8%	51.3%	3.9%	Trump +6.5%
The Hill/DDHQ	through November 3, 2024	November 3, 2024	44.9%	51.6%	3.2%	Trump +6.7%
Average			44.7%	51.3%	4.0%	Trump +6.6%

Poll source	Date(s) administered	Sample size	Margin of error	Donald Trump Republican	Kamala Harris Democratic	Other / Undecided
Research Co.	November 2–3, 2024	450 (LV)	± 4.6%	51%	44%	5%
Victory Insights	November 1–2, 2024	400 (LV)	–	51%	47%	2% (Note: "Other" with 2%)
Stetson University	October 25 – November 1, 2024	452 (LV)	± 5.0%	53%	46%	1% (Note: "Someone else" with 1%)
Morning Consult	October 23 − November 1, 2024	2,022 (LV)	± 2.0%	51%	46%	3%
Mainstreet Research/Florida Atlantic University	October 19–27, 2024	913 (RV)	± 3.2%	53%	44%	3% (Note: "Another candidate" with 1%)
Mainstreet Research/Florida Atlantic University	October 19–27, 2024	897 (LV)	± 3.2%	53%	44%	3%
ActiVote	October 11–27, 2024	400 (LV)	± 4.9%	56%	44%	–
St. Pete Polls (Note: Poll conducted for Florida Politics)	October 23–25, 2024	1,227 (LV)	± 2.8%	50%	45%	5% (Note: "Someone else" with 3%)
CES/YouGov	October 1–25, 2024	5,952 (A)	–	51%	47%	2%
CES/YouGov	October 1–25, 2024	5,916 (LV)	–	52%	46%	2%
Hunt Research (Note: Poll conducted for Florida State University)	October 16–22, 2024	1,234 (LV)	± 2.8%	50%	45%	5%
Emerson College	October 18–20, 2024	860 (LV)	± 3.3%	52%	44%	4%
Emerson College	October 18–20, 2024	860 (LV)	± 3.3%	54% (Note: With voters who lean towards a given candidate)	46%	–
Cherry Communications (R) (Note: Poll sponsored by Florida Chamber of Commerce)	October 10–20, 2024	614 (LV)	± 4.0%	51%	45%	4%
ActiVote	October 7–20, 2024	400 (LV)	± 4.9%	55%	45%	–
University of North Florida	October 7–18, 2024	977 (LV)	± 3.5%	53%	43%	4% (Note: "Someone else" with 2%)
RMG Research (Note: Poll sponsored by the Napolitan Institute)	October 14–17, 2024	788 (LV)	± 3.5%	52%	45%	3% (Note: "Some other candidate" with 1%)
RMG Research	October 14–17, 2024	788 (LV)	± 3.5%	52%	47%	1%
Rose Institute/YouGov	October 7–17, 2024	1,094 (RV)	± 3.5%	50%	45%	7% (Note: "Other" with 5%)
Rose Institute/YouGov	October 7–17, 2024	1,094 (RV)	± 3.5%	51%	46%	3%
Rose Institute/YouGov	October 7–17, 2024	1,076 (LV)	± 3.5%	51%	46%	3%
The Terrance Group (R) (Note: Poll sponsored by the Republican Party of Florida)	October 5–8, 2024	818 (RV)	± 3.5%	51%	44%	5%
Marist College	October 3–7, 2024	1,410 (RV)	± 3.3%	51%	47%	2% (Note: "Another party's candidates" with 1%)
Marist College	October 3–7, 2024	1,257 (LV)	± 3.6%	51%	47%	2%
New York Times/Siena College	September 29 – October 6, 2024	622 (LV)	± 5.0%	55%	41%	4%
ActiVote	September 17 – October 6, 2024	400 (LV)	± 4.9%	53%	47%	–
Mason-Dixon (Note: Poll conducted for WTVJ & WSCV)	October 1–4, 2024	625 (RV)	± 4.0%	49%	43%	8% (Note: "One of the other party tickets" with 2%)
RMG Research	September 25–27, 2024	774 (LV)	± 3.5%	50%	47%	3%
RMG Research	September 25–27, 2024	774 (LV)	± 3.5%	50%	48%	2%
Public Policy Polling (D) (Note: Poll commissioned by Clean and Prosperous America PAC)	September 25–26, 2024	800 (RV)	± 3.5%	50%	46%	4%
McLaughlin & Associates (R) (Note: Poll sponsored by Associated Industries of Florida)	September 23–25, 2024	1,200 (LV)	± 2.8%	51%	46%	3%
Victory Insights	September 22–25, 2024	600 (LV)	± 4.4%	47%	45%	8%
The Bullfinch Group (Note: Poll conducted for The Independent Center)	September 20–23, 2024	600 (RV)	± 4.0%	48%	47%	5%
Morning Consult	September 9−18, 2024	2,948 (LV)	± 2.0%	50%	47%	3%
Morning Consult	August 30 – September 8, 2024	3,182 (LV)	± 2.0%	49%	47%	4%
Emerson College	September 3–5, 2024	815 (LV)	± 3.4%	50%	45%	5%
Emerson College	September 3–5, 2024	815 (LV)	± 3.4%	51%	48%	1%
ActiVote	August 16–31, 2024	400 (LV)	± 4.9%	53%	47%	–
Cherry Communications (R)	August 15–26, 2024	600 (LV)	± 4.0%	52%	45%	3%
Public Policy Polling (D)	August 21–22, 2024	837 (RV)	± 3.4%	51%	47%	2%
ActiVote	August 5–15, 2024	400 (LV)	± 4.9%	54%	46%	–
Mainstreet Research/Florida Atlantic University	August 10–11, 2024	1,055 (RV)	± 3.0%	49%	46%	5% (Note: "Another candidate" with 2%)
Mainstreet Research/Florida Atlantic University	August 10–11, 2024	1,040 (LV)	± 3.0%	50%	47%	3%
University of North Florida	July 24–27, 2024	774 (LV)	± 4.6%	49%	42%	9% (Note: "Another candidate" with 4%)
	July 21, 2024	Kamala Harris declares her candidacy.				
InsiderAdvantage (R) (Note: Poll conducted for WTVT)	July 15–16, 2024	800 (LV)	± 4.0%	49%	39%	12% (Note: "Another candidate" with 7%)
Suffolk University/USA Today	September 15–18, 2022	500 (LV)	–	46%	44%	10%
Victory Insights	September 16–18, 2021	450 (LV)	± 4.6%	49%	51%	–

Donald Trump vs. Kamala Harris vs. Cornel West vs. Jill Stein vs. Chase Oliver

Poll source	Date(s) administered	Sample size	Margin of error	Donald Trump Republican	Kamala Harris Democratic	Cornel West Independent	Jill Stein Green	Chase Oliver Libertarian	Other / Undecided
Focaldata	October 3 – November 1, 2024	1,250 (LV)	–	52%	45%	–	0%	0%	3%
Focaldata	October 3 – November 1, 2024	1,099 (RV)	± 2.8%	50%	46%	–	1%	0%	3%
Focaldata	October 3 – November 1, 2024	1,250 (A)	–	49%	47%	–	1%	0%	3%
Cygnal (R)	October 26–28, 2024	600 (LV)	± 4.0%	48%	43%	–	1%	1%	7% (Note: Claudia De la Cruz (PSL) & Peter Sonski (ASP) with 1% each; Randall Terry (C) with 0%)
Hunt Research	October 16–22, 2024	1,234 (LV)	± 2.8%	50%	44%	–	0%	0%	6%
Redfield & Wilton Strategies	October 16–18, 2024	1,275 (LV)	–	49%	45%	–	0%	1%	6%
Redfield & Wilton Strategies	October 12–14, 2024	1,009 (LV)	–	50%	44%	–	1%	0%	5%
New York Times/Siena College	September 29 – October 6, 2024	622 (LV)	± 5.0%	53%	40%	–	0%	1%	6%
Redfield & Wilton Strategies	September 27 – October 2, 2024	2,946 (LV)	–	49%	45%	–	1%	1%	4%
Public Policy Polling (D)	September 25–26, 2024	800 (RV)	± 3.5%	49%	45%	0%	1%	–	5%
Redfield & Wilton Strategies	September 16–19, 2024	1,602 (LV)	–	50%	45%	–	0%	1%	4%
Redfield & Wilton Strategies	September 6–9, 2024	1,465 (LV)	–	50%	44%	–	0%	0%	6%
Redfield & Wilton Strategies	August 25–28, 2024	980 (LV)	± 3.1%	48%	43%	–	0%	1%	8% (Note: "Other (another third party/write-in)" with 1%)

Hypothetical polling with Robert F. Kennedy Jr.

Donald Trump vs. Kamala Harris vs. Robert F. Kennedy Jr. vs. Cornel West vs. Jill Stein vs. Chase Oliver

Poll source	Date(s) administered	Sample size	Margin of error	Donald Trump Republican	Kamala Harris Democratic	Robert Kennedy Jr Independent	Cornel West Independent	Jill Stein Green	Chase Oliver Libertarian	Other / Undecided
New York Times/Siena College	September 29 – October 6, 2024	622 (LV)	± 5.0%	53%	40%	0%	0%	0%	1%	6%
	August 23, 2024	Robert F. Kennedy Jr. suspends his presidential campaign and endorses Donald Trump.								
Public Policy Polling (D)	August 21–22, 2024	837 (RV)	± 3.4%	48%	45%	2%	1%	1%	–	3%
Redfield & Wilton Strategies	August 12–15, 2024	1,296 (LV)	–	48%	43%	3%	–	0%	1%	5%
Suffolk University/USA Today (Note: Poll sponsored by WSVN-TV)	August 7–11, 2024	500 (LV)	± 4.4%	47%	42%	5%	0%	0%	1%	5%
Redfield & Wilton Strategies	July 31 – August 3, 2024	976 (LV)	–	47%	41%	5%	–	0%	1%	6%
Redfield & Wilton Strategies	July 22–24, 2024	572 (LV)	–	47%	39%	5%	–	0%	1%	8%
Targoz Market Research (Note: Poll sponsored by the James Madison Institute, a conservative think tank)	July 19–24, 2024	1,200 (RV)	± 2.8%	46%	39%	5%	1%	1%	0%	8%
Targoz Market Research	July 19–24, 2024	988 (LV)	± 2.8%	47%	42%	4%	0%	0%	1%	6%

Donald Trump vs. Kamala Harris vs. Robert F. Kennedy Jr.

Poll source	Date(s) administered	Sample size	Margin of error	Donald Trump Republican	Kamala Harris Democratic	Robert Kennedy Jr Independent	Other / Undecided
	August 23, 2024	Robert F. Kennedy Jr. suspends his presidential campaign and endorses Donald Trump.					
Mainstreet Research/Florida Atlantic University	August 10–11, 2024	1,055 (RV)	± 3.0%	47%	44%	5%	4%
Mainstreet Research/Florida Atlantic University	August 10–11, 2024	1,040 (LV)	± 3.0%	47%	45%	5%	3%
McLaughlin & Associates (R)	August 6–8, 2024	800 (LV)	–	52%	44%	3%	1%

Hypothetical polling with Donald Trump and Joe Biden

Donald Trump vs. Joe Biden

Poll source	Date(s) administered	Sample size	Margin of error	Donald Trump Republican	Joe Biden Democratic	Other / Undecided
	July 21, 2024	Joe Biden withdraws from the race.				
InsiderAdvantage (R)	July 15–16, 2024	800 (LV)	± 4.0%	50%	44%	6% (Note: "Another candidate" with 3%)
Mainstreet Research/Florida Atlantic University	June 8–9, 2024	883 (RV)	± 3.3%	46%	42%	13%
Mainstreet Research/Florida Atlantic University	June 8–9, 2024	771 (LV)	± 3.3%	49%	43%	8%
The Tyson Group (R)	June 6–9, 2024	1,050 (LV)	± 3.0%	46%	36%	18%
Fox News	June 1–4, 2024	1,075 (RV)	± 3.0%	50%	46%	4%
CBS News/YouGov	May 10–16, 2024	1,209 (RV)	± 3.9%	54%	45%	1%
Prime Group (Note: Poll sponsored by Citizens to Save Our Republic PAC, which opposes Trump and third-party candidates)	May 9–16, 2024	486 (RV)	–	53%	47%	–
Cherry Communications (R)	April 28 – May 7, 2024	609 (RV)	± 4.0%	51%	42%	7%
John Zogby Strategies (Note: Poll conducted for Kennedy's campaign)	April 13–21, 2024	749 (LV)	–	51%	42%	7%
Mainstreet Research/Florida Atlantic University	April 15–17, 2024	865 (RV)	± 3.3%	50%	42%	8%
Mainstreet Research/Florida Atlantic University	April 15–17, 2024	815 (LV)	± 3.3%	51%	43%	6%
Emerson College	April 9–10, 2024	1,000 (RV)	± 3.0%	51%	38%	11%
Emerson College	April 9–10, 2024	1,000 (RV)	± 3.0%	56%	44%	–
St. Pete Polls	March 11–13, 2024	1,963 (LV)	± 2.2%	48%	42%	10%
Cygnal (R)	November 13–15, 2023	800 (LV)	± 3.4%	48%	43%	9%
Mainstreet Research/Florida Atlantic University	October 27 – November 11, 2023	946 (RV)	± 3.2%	49%	39%	12%
Redfield & Wilton Strategies	October 7–9, 2023	1,100 (RV)	–	44%	39%	17%
Mainstreet Research/Florida Atlantic University	June 27 – July 1, 2023	933 (RV)	± 3.2%	49%	39%	2%
Metropolitan Research Services	March 15–19, 2023	1,001 (RV)	–	47%	43%	10%
Emerson College	March 13–15, 2023	1,153 (RV)	± 2.8%	44%	44%	12%
University of North Florida	February 25 – March 7, 2023	1,452 (RV)	± 2.6%	50%	43%	7%
Victory Insights	November 16–17, 2022	600 (LV)	± 4.1%	49%	51%	–
Rasmussen Reports (R) (Note: Poll sponsored by NumbersUSA)	November 8–9, 2022	1,224 (LV)	± 3.0%	49%	40%	11%
Florida Atlantic University	October 12–16, 2022	719 (LV)	± 3.7%	45%	41%	14%
Suffolk University	September 15–18, 2022	500 (LV)	–	47%	44%	9%
Echelon Insights	August 31 – September 7, 2022	815 (LV)	± 4.3%	49%	41%	10%
Suffolk University	January 26–29, 2022	500 (LV)	± 4.4%	47%	44%	9%
Victory Insights	September 16–18, 2021	450 (LV)	± 4.6%	49%	51%	–
St. Pete Polls	August 16–17, 2021	2,068 (RV)	± 2.2%	47%	48%	5%
Susquehanna Polling & Research (R) (Note: Poll sponsored by BUSR)	August 4–10, 2021	700 (RV)	± 3.7%	42%	50%	8%

Donald Trump vs. Joe Biden vs. Robert F. Kennedy Jr. vs. Cornel West vs. Jill Stein

Poll source	Date(s) administered	Sample size	Margin of error	Donald Trump Republican	Joe Biden Democratic	Robert Kennedy Jr Independent	Cornel West Independent	Jill Stein Green	Other / Undecided
Targoz Market Research	July 19–24, 2024	1,200 (RV)	± 2.8%	47%	35%	6%	0%	1%	11% (Note: Chase Oliver (L) with 1%)
Targoz Market Research	July 19–24, 2024	988 (LV)	± 2.8%	46%	39%	5%	0%	1%	9% (Note: Chase Oliver (L) with 3%)
	July 21, 2024	Joe Biden withdraws from the race.							
Fox News	June 1–4, 2024	1,075 (RV)	± 3.0%	47%	40%	7%	2%	1%	3%
Prime Group	May 9–16, 2024	486 (RV)	–	48%	39%	9%	3%	1%	–
Emerson College	April 9–10, 2024	1,000 (RV)	± 3.0%	49%	35%	6%	1%	1%	8%

Donald Trump vs. Joe Biden vs. Robert F. Kennedy Jr.

Poll source	Date(s) administered	Sample size	Margin of error	Donald Trump Republican	Joe Biden Democratic	Robert Kennedy Jr Independent	Other / Undecided
	July 21, 2024	Joe Biden withdraws from the race.					
Mainstreet Research/Florida Atlantic University	June 8–9, 2024	883 (A)	± 3.3%	43%	37%	10%	10%
Mainstreet Research/Florida Atlantic University	June 8–9, 2024	771 (LV)	± 3.3%	45%	40%	8%	6%
Cherry Communications (R)	April 28 – May 7, 2024	609 (RV)	± 4.0%	46%	37%	10%	7%
Redfield & Wilton Strategies	May 2–4, 2024	586 (LV)	± 3.7%	47%	38%	6%	9%
Mainstreet Research/Florida Atlantic University	April 15–17, 2024	865 (RV)	± 3.3%	48%	38%	7%	7%
Mainstreet Research/Florida Atlantic University	April 15–17, 2024	815 (LV)	± 3.3%	49%	40%	6%	5%
USA Today/Ipsos	April 5–7, 2024	1,014 (A)	± 4.1%	39%	31%	7%	23%
Redfield & Wilton Strategies	March 14–17, 2024	815 (LV)	–	46%	39%	7%	8%
Redfield & Wilton Strategies	December 28–30, 2023	1,147 (LV)	–	45%	34%	9%	12%
Redfield & Wilton Strategies	November 27–29, 2023	897 (LV)	–	44%	34%	9%	13%
Cygnal (R)	November 13–15, 2023	800 (LV)	± 3.4%	44%	37%	11%	8%
Redfield & Wilton Strategies	October 7–9, 2023	1100 (LV)	–	44%	37%	8%	11%

Hypothetical polling with other candidates

Donald Trump vs. Robert F. Kennedy Jr.

Poll source	Date(s) administered	Sample size	Margin of error	Donald Trump Republican	Robert Kennedy Jr. Independent	Other / Undecided
John Zogby Strategies	April 13–21, 2024	749 (LV)	–	48%	37%	15%

Robert F. Kennedy Jr. vs. Joe Biden

Poll source	Date(s) administered	Sample size	Margin of error	Robert Kennedy Jr. Independent	Joe Biden Democratic	Other / Undecided
John Zogby Strategies	April 13–21, 2024	749 (LV)	–	47%	40%	13%

Donald Trump vs. Hillary Clinton

Poll source	Date(s) administered	Sample size	Margin of error	Donald Trump Republican	Hillary Clinton Democratic	Other / Undecided
Suffolk University	January 26–29, 2022	500 (LV)	± 4.4%	49%	42%	9%

Nikki Haley vs. Joe Biden vs. Robert F. Kennedy Jr.

Poll source	Date(s) administered	Sample size	Margin of error	Nikki Haley Republican	Joe Biden Democratic	Robert Kennedy Jr Independent	Other / Undecided
Redfield & Wilton Strategies	November 27–29, 2023	897 (LV)	–	27%	32%	16%	24%

Ron DeSantis vs. Joe Biden vs. Robert F. Kennedy Jr.

Poll source	Date(s) administered	Sample size	Margin of error	Ron DeSantis Republican	Joe Biden Democratic	Robert Kennedy Jr Independent	Other / Undecided
Redfield & Wilton Strategies	November 27–29, 2023	897 (LV)	–	38%	34%	12%	16%

Ron DeSantis vs. Joe Biden

Poll source	Date(s) administered	Sample size	Margin of error	Ron DeSantis Republican	Joe Biden Democratic	Other / Undecided
Cygnal (R)	November 13–15, 2023	800 (LV)	± 3.4%	46%	43%	11%
Mainstreet Research/Florida Atlantic University	October 27 – November 11, 2023	946 (RV)	± 3.2%	47%	39%	15%
Mainstreet Research/Florida Atlantic University	June 27 – July 1, 2023	933 (RV)	± 3.2%	49%	36%	15%
Emerson College	March 13–15, 2023	1,153 (RV)	± 2.8%	46%	43%	11%
University of North Florida	February 25 – March 7, 2023	1,452 (RV)	± 2.6%	51%	42%	8%
Cherry Communications	February 10–19, 2023	608 (LV)	± 4.0%	49%	38%	13%
Victory Insights	November 16–17, 2022	600 (LV)	± 4.1%	53%	47%	–
Suffolk University	September 15–18, 2022	500 (LV)	–	52%	44%	4%
Echelon Insights	August 31 – September 7, 2022	815 (LV)	± 4.3%	51%	42%	7%
Suffolk University	January 26–29, 2022	500 (LV)	± 4.4%	52%	44%	4%
Victory Insights	September 16–18, 2021	450 (LV)	± 4.6%	49%	51%	–
The Political Matrix/The Listener Group (R)	September 11–12, 2021	1,144 (LV)	± 3.1%	45%	55%	–
Susquehanna Polling & Research (R)	August 4–10, 2021	700 (RV)	± 3.7%	47%	49%	4%

Ron DeSantis vs. Kamala Harris

Poll source	Date(s) administered	Sample size	Margin of error	Ron DeSantis Republican	Kamala Harris Democratic	Other / Undecided
Suffolk University	September 15–18, 2022	500 (LV)	–	52%	40%	8%
Victory Insights	September 16–18, 2021	450 (LV)	± 4.6%	51%	49%	–

Ron DeSantis vs. Hillary Clinton

Poll source	Date(s) administered	Sample size	Margin of error	Ron DeSantis Republican	Hillary Clinton Democratic	Other / Undecided
Suffolk University	January 26–29, 2022	500 (LV)	± 4.4%	53%	40%	7%

=== Results ===
State House district results: Trump 40–50% 50–60% 60–70% 70–80% / Harris 40–50% 50–60% 60–70% 70–80%

State Senate district results: Trump 50–60% 60–70% 70–80% / Harris 50–60% 60–70%

2024 United States presidential election in Florida
Party	Candidate	Votes	%	±%
Republican	Donald Trump; JD Vance	6,110,125	56.09%	+4.87%
Democratic	Kamala Harris; Tim Walz	4,683,038	42.99%	−4.87%
Green	Jill Stein; Butch Ware	43,155	0.40%	+0.27%
Libertarian	Chase Oliver; Mike ter Maat	31,972	0.29%	−0.35%
Socialism and Liberation	Claudia De la Cruz; Karina Garcia	11,969	0.11%	+0.06%
American Solidarity	Peter Sonski; Lauren Onak	7,454	0.07%	N/A
Constitution	Randall Terry; Stephen Broden	5,834	0.05%	+0.01%
Write-in		205	0.00%	N/A
Total valid votes		10,893,752	99.00%	−0.31%
Invalid or blank votes		110,457	1.00%	
Turnout		11,004,209	78.89%	+1.72%
Registered electors		13,949,168	100.00%	−3.41%

==== By county ====
County	Donald Trump Republican		Kamala Harris Democratic		Various candidates Other parties		Margin		Total
County	#	%	#	%	#	%	#	%	Total
Alachua	52,939	38.77%	81,578	59.74%	2,031	1.49%	-28,639	-20.97%	136,548
Baker	12,926	86.31%	1,982	13.23%	69	0.46%	10,944	73.07%	14,977
Bay	71,497	73.12%	25,201	25.77%	1,079	1.10%	46,296	47.35%	97,777
Bradford	10,920	78.38%	2,946	21.15%	66	0.47%	7,974	57.24%	13,932
Brevard	216,533	59.91%	141,233	39.07%	3,683	1.02%	75,300	20.83%	361,449
Broward	358,952	41.04%	507,328	58.01%	8,259	0.94%	-148,376	-16.97%	874,539
Calhoun	5,367	83.49%	1,021	15.88%	40	0.62%	4,346	67.61%	6,428
Charlotte	82,480	66.69%	40,450	32.71%	746	0.60%	42,030	33.98%	123,676
Citrus	71,356	72.64%	26,276	26.75%	605	0.62%	45,080	45.89%	98,237
Clay	87,711	69.17%	37,926	29.91%	1,174	0.93%	49,785	39.26%	126,811
Collier	143,267	66.21%	71,720	33.15%	1,383	0.64%	71,547	33.07%	216,370
Columbia	25,108	74.74%	8,250	24.56%	234	0.70%	16,858	50.18%	33,592
DeSoto	8,888	71.17%	3,525	28.23%	75	0.60%	5,363	42.95%	12,488
Dixie	6,920	84.93%	1,183	14.52%	45	0.55%	5,737	70.41%	8,148
Duval	236,285	50.14%	229,365	48.67%	5,632	1.20%	6,920	1.47%	471,282
Escambia	96,407	59.23%	64,601	39.69%	1,747	1.07%	31,806	19.54%	162,755
Flagler	51,014	63.79%	28,431	35.55%	523	0.65%	22,583	28.24%	79,968
Franklin	4,831	71.49%	1,870	27.67%	57	0.84%	2,961	43.81%	6,758
Gadsden	7,495	34.27%	14,203	64.95%	170	0.78%	-6,708	-30.67%	21,868
Gilchrist	8,931	83.58%	1,662	15.55%	93	0.87%	7,269	68.02%	10,686
Glades	4,034	76.42%	1,222	23.15%	23	0.44%	2,812	53.27%	5,279
Gulf	6,684	76.85%	1,970	22.65%	43	0.49%	4,714	54.20%	8,697
Hamilton	3,964	69.14%	1,727	30.12%	42	0.73%	2,237	39.02%	5,733
Hardee	6,336	77.81%	1,751	21.50%	56	0.69%	4,585	56.31%	8,143
Hendry	9,253	68.74%	4,096	30.43%	111	0.82%	5,157	38.31%	13,460
Hernando	75,446	68.16%	34,431	31.11%	814	0.74%	41,015	37.05%	110,691
Highlands	36,382	70.09%	15,227	29.34%	296	0.57%	21,155	40.76%	51,905
Hillsborough	342,017	50.90%	321,455	47.84%	8,521	1.27%	20,562	3.06%	671,993
Holmes	8,193	89.87%	882	9.68%	41	0.45%	7,311	80.20%	9,116
Indian River	62,737	63.36%	35,654	36.01%	626	0.63%	27,083	27.35%	99,017
Jackson	16,074	72.74%	5,892	26.66%	132	0.60%	10,182	46.08%	22,098
Jefferson	5,011	58.94%	3,429	40.33%	62	0.73%	1,582	18.61%	8,502
Lafayette	3,296	87.75%	441	11.74%	19	0.51%	2,855	76.01%	3,756
Lake	140,500	61.95%	84,546	37.28%	1,742	0.77%	55,954	24.67%	226,788
Lee	250,661	63.86%	139,240	35.47%	2,631	0.67%	111,421	28.39%	392,532
Leon	60,397	38.52%	94,520	60.28%	1,885	1.20%	-34,123	-21.76%	156,802
Levy	18,245	74.84%	5,994	24.59%	139	0.57%	12,251	50.25%	24,378
Liberty	2,898	83.04%	566	16.22%	26	0.74%	2,332	66.82%	3,490
Madison	5,874	64.15%	3,231	35.29%	51	0.56%	2,643	28.87%	9,156
Manatee	140,486	61.39%	86,674	37.87%	1,700	0.74%	53,812	23.51%	228,860
Marion	140,173	65.47%	72,436	33.83%	1,497	0.70%	67,737	31.64%	214,106
Martin	64,121	65.24%	33,539	34.12%	631	0.64%	30,582	31.11%	98,291
Miami-Dade	605,590	55.35%	480,355	43.90%	8,160	0.75%	125,235	11.45%	1,094,105
Monroe	26,064	58.80%	17,933	40.46%	331	0.75%	8,131	18.34%	44,328
Nassau	47,945	73.06%	17,143	26.12%	537	0.82%	30,802	46.94%	65,625
Okaloosa	80,309	70.67%	32,074	28.23%	1,253	1.10%	48,235	42.45%	113,636
Okeechobee	12,315	76.69%	3,671	22.86%	72	0.45%	8,644	53.83%	16,058
Orange	258,279	42.54%	340,807	56.13%	8,113	1.34%	-82,528	-13.59%	607,199
Osceola	86,713	50.19%	84,205	48.74%	1,862	1.08%	2,508	1.45%	172,780
Palm Beach	366,836	49.19%	372,512	49.95%	6,361	0.85%	-5,676	-0.76%	745,709
Pasco	197,779	62.10%	117,450	36.88%	3,242	1.02%	80,329	25.22%	318,471
Pinellas	269,472	52.11%	242,452	46.89%	5,150	1.00%	27,020	5.23%	517,074
Polk	209,044	59.91%	136,879	39.23%	3,008	0.86%	72,165	20.68%	348,931
Putnam	26,700	73.61%	9,354	25.79%	218	0.60%	17,346	47.82%	36,272
Santa Rosa	84,314	75.00%	27,035	24.05%	1,076	0.96%	57,279	50.95%	112,425
Sarasota	163,219	58.74%	112,668	40.55%	1,979	0.71%	50,551	18.19%	277,866
Seminole	129,735	51.13%	120,717	47.58%	3,275	1.29%	9,018	3.55%	253,727
St. Johns	128,759	65.21%	66,862	33.86%	1,836	0.93%	61,897	31.35%	197,457
St. Lucie	100,293	54.17%	83,517	45.11%	1,321	0.71%	16,776	9.06%	185,131
Sumter	72,134	68.56%	32,551	30.94%	533	0.51%	39,583	37.62%	105,218
Suwannee	17,561	80.22%	4,217	19.26%	113	0.52%	13,344	60.96%	21,891
Taylor	7,954	79.56%	1,991	19.92%	52	0.52%	5,963	59.65%	9,997
Union	5,224	83.84%	971	15.58%	36	0.58%	4,253	68.26%	6,231
Volusia	187,691	60.45%	120,132	38.69%	2,675	0.86%	67,559	21.76%	310,498
Wakulla	14,246	71.75%	5,441	27.40%	169	0.85%	8,805	44.34%	19,856
Walton	38,970	78.57%	10,287	20.74%	344	0.69%	28,683	57.83%	49,601
Washington	10,370	82.41%	2,140	17.01%	74	0.59%	8,230	65.40%	12,584
Totals	6,110,125	56.09%	4,683,038	42.99%	100,589	0.92%	1,427,087	13.10%	10,893,752

==== Counties that flipped from Democratic to Republican ====
- Duval (largest municipality: Jacksonville)
- Hillsborough (largest municipality: Tampa)
- Miami-Dade (largest municipality: Miami)
- Osceola (largest municipality: Kissimmee)
- Pinellas (largest municipality: St. Petersburg)
- Seminole (largest municipality: Sanford)

==== By congressional district ====
Trump won 20 of 28 congressional districts.

District	Trump	Harris	Representative
1st	68.09%	30.89%	Matt Gaetz
2nd	58.51%	40.51%	Neal Dunn
3rd	60.09%	38.97%	Kat Cammack
4th	55.42%	43.58%	Aaron Bean
5th	60.15%	38.71%	John Rutherford
6th	64.68%	34.59%	Michael Waltz
7th	55.68%	43.20%	Cory Mills
8th	60.70%	38.36%	Bill Posey (118th Congress)
8th	60.70%	38.36%	Mike Haridopolos (119th Congress)
9th	47.65%	51.17%	Darren Soto
10th	37.97%	60.68%	Maxwell Frost
11th	57.67%	41.41%	Daniel Webster
12th	66.89%	32.31%	Gus Bilirakis
13th	55.45%	43.60%	Anna Paulina Luna
14th	45.59%	53.26%	Kathy Castor
15th	54.87%	43.68%	Laurel Lee
16th	57.30%	41.83%	Vern Buchanan
17th	61.63%	37.69%	Greg Steube
18th	64.31%	34.91%	Scott Franklin
19th	64.26%	35.10%	Byron Donalds
20th	29.75%	69.35%	Sheila Cherfilus-McCormick
21st	57.93%	41.36%	Brian Mast
22nd	46.78%	52.35%	Lois Frankel
23rd	48.60%	50.51%	Jared Moskowitz
24th	34.54%	64.60%	Frederica Wilson
25th	46.82%	52.16%	Debbie Wasserman Schultz
26th	67.16%	32.19%	Mario Díaz-Balart
27th	56.94%	42.28%	María Elvira Salazar
28th	62.36%	36.96%	Carlos A. Giménez

== Analysis ==
In 2020, Republican Donald Trump (who changed his resident state from New York to Florida in 2019) carried the state again by 3.4 percentage points, an improvement from his 1.2% margin in 2016, despite Trump losing re-election nationwide and polls pointing to a narrow Democratic win in Florida. In addition, Republicans won all statewide offices by double-digit margins in the 2022 midterms.

A heavily populated South Atlantic state, Florida had formerly been considered a crucial swing state and a bellwether in previous election cycles, but has shifted significantly to the political right and is now considered a safe red state with Trump's double-digit margin of victory solidifying it as such. Florida has two large distinct cultural areas. North Florida and the Florida Panhandle are part of the conservative Deep South. South Florida has a heavy Latin American influence, with large Catholic Cuban, Haitian, Central and South American populations in the Miami metropolitan area.

Precinct results in Tampa Metro Area Trump: 40–50%; 50–60%; 60–70%; 70–80%; 80–90%; >90%; Harris: 40–50%; 50–60%; 60–70%; 70–80%; 80–90%; No data

=== Statewide trends ===
With Democrats not seriously contesting the state, they finished with their worst presidential performance in the state since 1988. Florida and Iowa had voted twice for Democrat Barack Obama, and voted for Trump by 13% in 2024.

Florida voted over 10% to the right of the nation and its neighboring state of Georgia. Florida had previously voted to the left of Georgia from 1996 to 2016, and in 2016 Florida voted for Trump by just 1.2%.

Just eight years prior in 2016, Democrat Hillary Clinton had won Miami-Dade by 29%, Broward by 35%, and Palm Beach by 15%. In 2024, Harris lost Miami-Dade by 11%, won Broward by 17%, and won Palm Beach by less than 1%. Clinton had won the Miami metropolitan area by 27%, while Harris won it by just 1%.

Some of the largest rightward swings in the country were in South Florida, along with South Texas and the New York metropolitan area. Every single county in Florida swung rightward, with the three majority-Hispanic counties swinging the hardest.

=== County swings ===
2024 Miami Metropolitan Presidential Election

Precinct results in Orlando Metro Area Trump: 40–50%; 50–60%; 60–70%; 70–80%; 80–90%; >90%; Harris: 40–50%; 50–60%; 60–70%; 70–80%; 80–90%; >90%; Stein: >90%; Tie No data

Florida handed Republican Donald Trump a decisive victory, doing so by a margin of 1,427,087 votes—his second-largest state win in terms of vote count, behind Texas. This was the first time since 1988 that the state was won with a double-digit margin, and that Miami-Dade County voted Republican. It was also the first time since 1992 that the state voted Republican in three consecutive presidential elections. Trump became the first Republican nominee to win Hillsborough County and Osceola County since 2004. He also flipped back Duval County, Pinellas County, and Seminole County after carrying them in 2016. Trump narrowly lost his home county of Palm Beach.

Following the 2022 midterms under Governor Ron DeSantis and Senator Marco Rubio, this election has cemented Florida's transition from a swing state to a reliable red state. Trump's performance was similar to Rubio's 2022 U.S. Senate performance, with both only narrowly losing Palm Beach County. Relatedly, Republican Rick Scott won by a nearly identical 12.8% margin in the concurrent 2024 U.S. Senate election in Florida with the same county map. Meanwhile, although a majority of voters supported Amendments 3 and 4 which would respectively legalize recreational marijuana and enshrine abortion rights, both fell short of 60% and failed.

According to exit polls, Hispanic men voted to the right of White women in the state. Trump also won a majority of Hispanic women in Florida. DeSantis and Rubio had also won a majority of Hispanic women in Florida in 2022. Miami-Dade County (70% Hispanic) voted for Trump by over 11%, shifting rightward by 19 percentage points and voting almost as strongly for Trump as his 13% statewide margin. The state's most populous county, Miami-Dade had voted for Hillary Clinton by 29% and Biden by 7%, with the county shifting hard to the right like many South Texas counties over Trump's three runs. Trump won a majority of Hispanics in Florida and Texas, based on exit polls and county results in majority-Hispanic counties. Trump narrowly lost Miami's city limits by around 1000 votes, a strong performance for a Republican in a major city.

The only counties where Harris held up well were majority-Black Gadsden County, 30% Black Leon County (home to the state capital of Tallahassee and Florida State University), and Alachua County (home to the University of Florida). Gadsden County gave Harris 65% of the vote, Leon County 60%, and Alachua County 59%. Harris held up with Black voters and White voters with college degrees, but collapsed nationwide among Hispanic voters even in urban areas. (Note: As one example, Trump won 27% of the vote in The Bronx, which is 56% Hispanic, 34% Black, 5% Asian, and just 14% White.) Nationally, Trump came within single digits of winning Hispanic voters (51-46%) and won a majority of Latino male voters (54-44%). Latino men voted to the right of White women (53-46%), because Harris did well among White women with college degrees (58-41%). Harris did nonetheless win New Mexico by 6%, despite New Mexico being half-Hispanic.

Harris only narrowly won the Miami metropolitan area, as a whole winning the three counties of Palm Beach, Broward, and Miami-Dade over Trump by just 1,360,195 to 1,331,378 (49.95% to 48.89%). In Broward County (home to Fort Lauderdale and 27% Black), Harris won just 58% of the vote, the lowest for a Democratic candidate there since 1992. Broward voted to the right of Gadsden, Leon, and Alachua counties despite being far more populous. Harris only won Palm Beach County by less than 1%, though it was Trump's home county and Ron DeSantis had won the county in 2022.

Florida had the third-largest swing to the right in this election (after New York and New Jersey), with Trump improving his performance from 2020 by 9.7%. It was also the largest swing to the right in a state he won.

=== Exit poll data ===
2024 presidential election in Florida voter demographics
Demographic subgroup	Trump	Harris	% of total vote
Ideology
Liberals	12	87	19
Moderates	46	53	44
Conservatives	91	9	38
Party
Democrats	2	97	25
Republicans	93	6	39
Independents	53	45	36
Gender
Men	62	38	46
Women	51	48	54
Race/ethnicity
White	63	37	59
Black	15	83	12
Latino	58	42	24
Asian	n/a	n/a	2
All other races	71	28	3
Cuban/Puerto Rican descent
Cuban descent	70	30	6
Puerto Rican descent	45	53	7
Gender by race/ethnicity
White men	68	31	27
White women	58	41	32
Black men	23	76	5
Black women	11	88	7
Latino men	63	37	12
Latina women	52	46	12
All other races	70	29	5
Age
18–29 years old	44	56	14
30–44 years old	56	43	23
45–64 years old	59	40	35
65 and older	58	41	28
First time voter
Yes	51	49	11
No	57	42	89
2020 presidential vote
Biden	7	92	38
Trump	97	3	48
Another candidate	n/a	n/a	2
Did not vote	53	47	11
Education
No college degree	58	41	64
College graduate	53	46	36
Education by race
White college graduates	56	43	24
White no college degree	67	32	35
Non-white college graduates	46	53	12
Non-white no college degree	47	53	28
Area type
Urban	50	49	46
Suburban	61	38	46
Rural	64	35	8
Biden job approval
Strongly disapprove	94	5	50
Somewhat disapprove	52	46	14
Somewhat approve	5	95	18
Strongly approve	2	97	16
Feeling about the way things are going in U.S.
Angry	79	20	27
Dissatisfied	59	40	51
Satisfied	17	83	15
Enthusiastic	n/a	n/a	5
Quality of candidate that mattered most
Has ability to lead	73	27	34
Can bring needed change	75	23	28
Has good judgment	18	80	18
Cares about people like me	30	70	18
Vote for president mainly
For your candidate	61	38	76
Against their opponent	35	63	21
Issue regarded as most important
Democracy	17	82	30
Economy	80	20	38
Abortion	20	80	11
Immigration	86	14	16
Foreign policy	n/a	n/a	3
Democracy threatened in the United States
Democracy in the U.S. very threatened	56	44	40
Democracy in the U.S. somewhat threatened	57	43	33
Democracy in the U.S. somewhat secure	49	50	17
Democracy in the U.S. very secure	n/a	n/a	8
Confident election being conducted fairly and accurately
Very confident	48	51	38
Somewhat confident	59	40	43
Not very confident	63	35	13
Not at all confident	n/a	n/a	4
Condition of the nation's economy
Poor	86	13	40
Not so good	61	37	31
Good	8	91	22
Excellent	n/a	n/a	6
Family's financial situation today
Worse than four years ago	84	15	55
About the same	26	72	25
Better than four years ago	13	86	19
Abortion should be
Legal in all cases	24	74	27
Legal in most cases	46	53	37
Illegal in most cases	94	6	27
Illegal in all cases	n/a	n/a	5

== See also ==
- 2024 Florida Amendment 3 (a voter initiative that occurred on the same day as the presidential election)
- 2024 Florida Amendment 4 (a referendum that occurred on the same day as the presidential election)
- United States presidential elections in Florida
- 2024 United States presidential election
- 2024 Democratic Party presidential primaries
- 2024 Republican Party presidential primaries
- 2024 Florida elections
- 2024 United States elections

== Notes ==
Partisan clients
