= Opinion polling on the Biden administration =

Surveying on 2021–2025 US presidency

Joe Biden, a Democrat from Delaware, was elected President of the United States on November 3, 2020. He was inaugurated on January 20, 2021, as the nation's 46th president.

The following articles are lists of opinion pollings on his administration:

- 2021
  - 2021 opinion polling on the Biden administration
- 2022
  - 2022 opinion polling on the Biden administration
- 2023
  - 2023 opinion polling on the Biden administration
- 2024–2025
  - 2024–2025 opinion polling on the Biden administration
