= Center for American Political Studies =

Program at Harvard University

The Center for American Political Studies at Harvard University (abbreviated CAPS) is an interdisciplinary program of Harvard University's Faculty of Arts and Sciences that studies the politics of the United States from the perspective of political science, sociology, history, and economics. The center sponsors the monthly Harvard–Harris Poll, which is conducted by Stagwell subsidiaries The Harris Poll and HarrisX.

== Notable people ==
- Theda Skocpol (former director)

== See also ==
- Harvard Institute of Politics
