= Susquehanna Polling & Research =

American opinion polling company

- Type: Corporation
- Industry: public opinion polling
- Founded: 2000
- Headquarters: 604 North Third Street; Harrisburg, Pennsylvania
- Key people: James Lee Founder and President
- Website: http://www.susquehannapolling.com

Susquehanna Polling & Research is an American public opinion polling company, based in Harrisburg, Pennsylvania.

Susquehanna Polling & Research was founded by James Lee in 2000. The firm is the official polling company for ABC 27 television station in Harrisburg. The firm specializes in polling services for Republican candidates, trade groups, businesses, and lobbying firms in Pennsylvania, New Jersey, Delaware, and Maryland.
