= Random digit dialing =

Telephone polling method

Random digit dialing (RDD) is a method for selecting people for involvement in telephone statistical surveys by generating telephone numbers at random. Random digit dialing has the advantage that it includes unlisted numbers that would be missed if the numbers were selected from a phone book. In populations where there is a high telephone-ownership rate, it can be a cost efficient way to get complete coverage of a geographic area. RDD is widely used for statistical surveys, including election opinion polling, as well as selection of experimental control groups.

When the desired coverage area matches up closely enough with country codes and area codes, random digits can be chosen within the desired area codes. In cases where the desired region doesn't match area codes such as electoral districts, surveys must rely on telephone databases, and must rely on self-reported address information for unlisted numbers. Increasing use of mobile phones (although there are currently techniques which allow infusion of wireless phones into the RDD sampling frame), number portability, and voice over Internet protocol have begun to decrease the ability for RDD to target specific areas within a country and achieve complete coverage.

== See also ==
- Auto dialer

== Sources ==
- Wen-Fu P. Shih (1980). "An evaluation of random digit dialing household survey" (PDF). American Statistical Association. Archived from the original (PDF) on September 10, 2004.
- Donna J. Brogan1, Maxine M. Denniston; et al. (2001-06-01). "Comparison of Telephone Sampling and Area Sampling: Response Rates and Within-Household Coverage". American Journal of Epidemiology. American Journal of Epidemiology. Archived from the original on 2013-04-15.
