= Siena Research Institute =

Public opinion research company in the U.S.

Siena Research Institute at Siena University
- Formation: 1980
- Founder: Doug Lonnstrom
- Location: Loudonville, New York, U.S.
- Director: Donald P. Levy
- Affiliations: Siena University
- Website: sri.siena.edu

Siena Research Institute at Siena University (SRI) is an affiliated research institute at Siena University in Loudonville, New York, in suburban Albany. It was founded in 1980.

The institute conducts both expert and public opinion polls, focusing on New York State and the United States, on issues of public policy interest. They include education, health care, and consumer confidence, and explores business, economic, political, voter, social, educational, and historical issues. SRI conducted surveys on New Yorkers' sentiments towards the creation of the Cordoba House Mosque near the World Trade Center site in lower Manhattan, and the Arizona Immigration Law.

Among other things, starting in 1982, the institute has polled presidential scholars in an effort to rate the United States presidents, as well as the First Ladies. It has also conducted polls as to America's most notable women, television's most memorable moment, and consumer confidence.

Statistics and finance professor Doug Lonnstrom was the institute's founding director. Donald P. Levy is its current director.

== The New York Times/Siena ==
In July 2013, SRI and The New York Times began a polling partnership, with its first collaborative poll conducted for the 2013 New York City mayoral election.

In 2018, The New York Times/Siena partnership delivered the first real time Midterm Election polls. In its review of polling conducted during the 2022 midterm elections, FiveThirtyEight found that The New York Times/Siena partnered polls had the lowest statistical error of all pollsters it measured, tied with Suffolk University. In 2024, it held a 3-star rating from FiveThirtyEight, their highest possible rating for a pollster, based on measurements of error, bias, and transparency in methodology. FiveThirtyEight described The New York Times/Siena Poll as the most accurate pollster in America.

The New York Times/Siena Poll contacts a random sample of respondents, with sampling frames drawn from a national voter file of registered voters from data company L2 and supplemented with voter file-matched cellular numbers from market research company Marketing Systems Group. The file contains information on the past voting activity and demographics of voters. It utilizes live interviewers calling both landlines and cellphones in a dual frame model. For recent polls conducted by The New York Times/Siena, over 90% of contacts are reached through cell phones and calls are aimed to last under 15 minutes. The poll aims to reach a representative sample of American voters and adjusts for participation bias via stratified sampling, utilizing demographic information such as race, party affiliation, and regional location. The poll attempts more contacts with respondents from groups that are less likely to respond. As of 2024, overall response rates to The New York Times/Siena Poll calls are usually under 2%. A 2022 incentivized poll conducted by The New York Times as an experiment in partnership with Ipsos achieved a 30% response rate while finding similar results to the lower response rate Siena partnered polls. The New York Times/Siena Poll has also variously used a turnout model to prioritize calls to a "likely electorate", which is gauged based on trends detected in The New York Times/Siena polls, past election results, and demographic data. This model was utilized for sampling in the 2018 midterm election but not the 2016 presidential election.

Completed surveys are weighted for probability of selection by stratum. Demographic weights of likely voters are weighted primarily with modeled turnout estimates from the poll's overall voter file, with adjustments made based on 12 demographic variables. Weighting of registered voter results, instead of likely voters, is conducted directly through characteristics derived from the voter file, without using the turnout model. Demographic information on education is not available in the voter file, and is weighted separately with the American Community Survey and Current Population Survey from the United States Census Bureau. Poll questions are published verbatim in the reports of each poll. In May 2026, The New York Times/Siena poll introduced a unique measure called "synthetic past vote" as a weighting target in order to address systemic underestimates of support for President Donald Trump. The Times stated that weighting based on respondent-reported recalled past votes, as some other pollsters have relied on, was unreliable and did not mitigate underestimates of Trump. The Times noted concerns with response bias in recalled votes and reported finding that half of survey respondents who did not vote in past elections report doing so, while 15% of past voters did not report who they voted for. The synthetic past vote measure imputes modeled past votes for known voters based on their demographic and political characteristics, while striking recalled votes from voters who were not verified to have voted in the last election. The synthetic past vote is weighted based on estimates of expected voters for future elections, taking into account deaths, removals from voter rolls, relocation, and reduced turnout. About 20% of respondents are classified differently from their reported recalled vote under the synthetic past vote. The measure does not replace reported results for recalled votes in poll crosstabs.

When nearing election days, the poll emphasizes results among likely voters over registered voters overall, which is determined through a respondent's voting history and self-reported intention to vote.

== See also ==
- Quinnipiac University Polling Institute
- Emerson College Polling
- Franklin & Marshall College Poll
- Suffolk University Political Research Center
- Monmouth University Polling Institute
- Marist Institute for Public Opinion
