= Suffolk University Political Research Center =

Opinion polling center in Boston, Massachusetts

The Suffolk University Political Research Center (SUPRC) is an opinion polling center at Suffolk University in Boston, Massachusetts.

== History, organization, and leadership ==
Founded in 2002, the center mostly conducts national and statewide polls, conducting many of the latter in New Hampshire and Massachusetts. On occasion, the center has polled local races, such as the 2013 mayoral election in Boston, which Suffolk polled for the Boston Herald. The center has also polled on ballot issues, such as marijuana legalization and charter schools.

The founding and current director is David Paleologos. Paleologos is also a lecturer in the Political Science and Legal Studies Department of Suffolk University's College of Arts and Sciences and a member of the American Association of Public Opinion Researchers (AAPOR).

Suffolk is one of a handful of well-known academic polling centers in the United States; others include Marist College in New York (Marist Institute for Public Opinion), Monmouth University in New Jersey (Monmouth University Polling Institute), and Quinnipiac University in Connecticut (Quinnipiac University Polling Institute).

== Political history and methodology ==
The center states that it is "the first research center to make all of the demographic cross-tabulation data for every poll available at no cost." Suffolk began polling "battleground states" in presidential elections in 2008.

In terms of methodology, the center uses live telephone calling, including mobile phones. The center began including mobile phones in its samples in 2012, beginning with closely fought campaigns. In the 2014 gubernatorial election for governor of Massachusetts, the Suffolk University/Boston Herald poll sampled a much higher percentage of mobile phones (35%) than some other pollsters. Suffolk's polling in the race "tended to be quite accurate, although the differences from some of the other polls were not large." Suffolk predicted that Republican nominee Charlie Baker would defeat Democratic nominee Martha Coakley, 46% to 43%, though in actuality, the margin of victory was one percentage point lower. An article published in the AAPOR journal Survey Practice noted this result in concluding that, "In Democratic-leaning states such as Massachusetts...exceeding state-wide cell-phone base rates may be necessary to measure candidates' standing accurately."

Suffolk has made use of polling methodologies that combine traditional statewide probability sampling with additional nonprobability sampling of bellwether districts, making use of this technique in its 2008 New Hampshire primary polls for WHDH, among other races. By the year 2011, the firm's "bellwether predictions have matched election outcomes in 33 of 36 cases, a 'hit rate' of 92%."

In 2014, Suffolk began a partnership with USA Today and its news network to poll that year's elections.

In 2016, Suffolk and USA Today continued their relationship, with SUPRC conducting national polling for the newspaper.

As of September 2020, the polling analysis website FiveThirtyEight, led by statistician Nate Silver, had 88 Suffolk polls in its database, and gave the polling center an "A" grade on the basis of its historical accuracy and methodology, and listed the pollster as having 80% accuracy record in calling races.

In 2021, Suffolk University, along with USA TODAY, began releasing polls of inner city residents, called "CityView," to examine attitudes toward crime, race, and police practices in cities. The surveys included residents of Milwaukee, Detroit, Los Angeles, Louisville, Oklahoma City, Dallas, Seattle, and Miami.

In 2022, Suffolk University and USA TODAY teamed up to poll 1000 Russian and Ukrainian residents of the U.S. and recorded attitudes toward world leaders, the current war, President Biden, and world organizations. Suffolk University produced seven polls in the final three weeks leading up to the November 2022 midterm elections. All seven polls correctly predicted the U.S. Senate winners, including the states of Arizona, Nevada, New Hampshire, and Pennsylvania.

In March 2023, Nate Silver’s fivethirtyeight.com rankings of pollster accuracy put SUPRC at the top of their list of the most accurate pollsters in the midterm election cycle (2021-2022): “Special congratulations are due to Suffolk University…which had the lowest average errors of any pollster that conducted at least five qualifying polls last cycle.” The website realclearpolitics.com rated Suffolk University polling #1 over five election cycles (2014-2022) among pollsters who had polled at least 10 states.

In the 2024 presidential election cycle, Suffolk's statewide and bellwether polls in swing states for president and U.S. Senate were all within the statistical margin of error in the final three weeks leading up to the election (pollster rated). This included 14 out of 14 statistical outcomes. www.suffolk.edu/suprc

== See also ==
- Quinnipiac University Polling Institute
- Franklin & Marshall College Poll
- Siena Research Institute
- Monmouth University Polling Institute
- Marist Institute for Public Opinion
