= Quinnipiac University Polling Institute =

Public opinion polling center in the United States

Quinnipiac University Poll
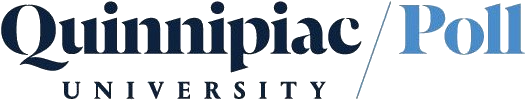
- Founder: Paul Falcigno
- Headquarters: 60 Westwoods Road; Hamden, Connecticut, U.S.
- Director: Doug Schwartz
- Affiliations: Quinnipiac University
- Staff: 300
- Website: poll.qu.edu

The Quinnipiac University Poll is a public opinion polling center based at Quinnipiac University in Hamden, Connecticut. It surveys public opinion in Connecticut, Florida, Georgia, Iowa, Michigan, Minnesota, New York, New Jersey, North Carolina, Pennsylvania, Ohio, Texas, Virginia, Wisconsin and nationally. The poll is unaffiliated with any academic department at the school and is run by Quinnipiac's public relations department.

Academic-affiliated polls like Quinnipiac have grown in significance as media budgets have declined, and in 2017 Politico called the Quinnipiac poll "the most significant player among a number of schools that have established a national polling footprint."

It is considerably larger than other academic polling centers, including the Franklin & Marshall College Poll, which only surveys Pennsylvania. The organization employs about 300 interviewers, generally drawing about a quarter of its employees from political science, communications, psychology, and sociology majors, and the remainder of interviewers from those not affiliated with the university. The poll has a full-time staff of ten. The university does not disclose Quinnipiac University Poll's operating budget, and the poll does not accept clients or outside funding.

== History ==
The polling operation began informally in 1988 in conjunction with a marketing class. It became formal in 1996 when the university hired a CBS News analyst to assess the data being gained. It subsequently focused on the Northeastern states, gradually expanding during presidential elections to cover swing states as well. The institute is funded by the university. Quinnipiac University is widely known for its poll; the publicity it has generated has been credited with increasing the university's enrollment.

In 2007, Quinnipiac University Poll underwent construction of a new two-story building that was expected to double its available capacity to 160 calling cubicles. The purpose of the capacity expansion was to allow polling multiple states at once, rectifying a problem that arose during the 2006 Connecticut Senate election where other polls were canceled to support that poll.

The poll has been cited by major news outlets throughout North America and Europe, including The Washington Post, Fox News, USA Today, The New York Times, CNN, and Reuters. Quinnipiac University Poll receives national recognition for its independent surveys of residents throughout the United States. It conducts public opinion polls on politics and public policy as a public service as well as for academic research. Poll results are also aggregated by ABC News' FiveThirtyEight. Andrew S. Tanenbaum, the founder of the poll-analysis website Electoral-vote.com, compared major pollsters' performances in the 2010 midterm Senate elections and concluded that Quinnipiac was the most accurate, with a mean error of 2.0 percent.

Politico reported in 2018 that "much of Quinnipiac’s prominence in the field is also a result of its commitment to self-promotion." The publication pointed out that the poll "reports to the university’s public-affairs office, not any academic wing of the school," and that for many years the poll employed New York publicist Howard Rubenstein and prominent journalists to promote the poll.

== Methodology ==
The Quinnipiac University Poll conducts polling through random digit dialing with live interviewers. Polls utilize 100-200 interviewers consisting of university students and Hamden residents, dialing both landlines and cell phones. Phone numbers are obtained from market research company Dynata. In the event of a missed call, Quinnipiac attempts four call-backs. If a household with multiple members is reached, interviewers ask to speak to the individual with the closest upcoming birthday as a quasirandom within-household selection method. Polls are typically conducted over a five-day period and aim to gather a random sample of about 1,500 respondents.

Responses to polls are weighted with US Census demographic data, adjusting for the variables of age, education, gender, race, and region.

Quinnipiac University polls target American adults aged 18 and over. For political polling, Quinnipiac identifies registered and likely voters from screening questions. The poll emphasizes results from surveys of likely voters when approaching election days.

== See also ==
- Suffolk University Political Research Center
- Monmouth University Polling Institute
- Siena Research Institute
- Marist Institute for Public Opinion
