= Monmouth University Polling Institute =

US public opinion research institute

The Monmouth University Polling Institute was a public opinion research institute located on the Monmouth University campus in West Long Branch, New Jersey. The Polling Institute was established in 2005, and was led by director Patrick Murray.

In 2022, the polling analysis website FiveThirtyEight had 120 Monmouth polls in its database, and gave the polling institute an "A" grade on the basis of its historical accuracy and methodology. The poll appeared on the list in 2014 with an A-minus, and received an A-plus in 2016, 2018 and 2020. The Institute is a signatory to the American Association for Public Opinion Research (AAPOR) Transparency Initiative. The Monmouth University Polling Institute closed in July 2025.

== Methodology ==
The Monmouth University Poll was conducted in a multi-modal fashion, incorporating phone calls to landlines and cell phones, and online surveys delivered through text and email. Sample selection was conducted on a case-by-case basis depending on the survey topics. Polls were weighted for demographic factors like age and also incorporated partisan affiliation for political polls.

== Recognition ==
In 2009, the institute's gubernatorial polling received national attention, including findings that indicated the eventual winner Chris Christie's weight was an issue for voters in the campaign.

In 2010, the institute's director Patrick Murray was named "Pollster of the Year" by PolitickerNJ and one of the 100 most influential people in New Jersey politics. Murray is an occasional contributor to the Huffington Post's Pollster page.

== Closure ==
The polling institute closed on July 1, 2025. University president Patrick F. Leahy attributed the closure to the "considerable resources required" to operate the institute.

== See also ==
- The Phillips Academy Poll
- Quinnipiac University Polling Institute
- Suffolk University Political Research Center
- Emerson College Polling
- Siena Research Institute
- Marist Institute for Public Opinion
