= Marist Poll =

US public opinion poll

Marist Institute of Public Opinion
- Abbreviation: MIPO
- Formation: 1978
- Headquarters: Poughkeepsie, New York
- Key people: Lee Miringoff (Director of MIPO); Barbara Carvalho (Director of Marist Poll)
- Affiliations: Marist University
- Website: maristpoll.marist.edu

The Marist Poll, founded in 1978, is a national public opinion poll operated by the Marist Institute for Public Opinion (MIPO) on the campus of Marist University in Poughkeepsie, New York. The poll was one of the first college-based public opinion polls in the United States. MIPO regularly measures public opinion, both in New York State and across the country. In 2020, polls were conducted in Arizona, Florida, New Hampshire, New York, North Carolina, South Carolina, and Texas. The Marist Poll has an 'A' rating from ABC News' FiveThirtyEight and is often cited by journalists and pundits around the world.

== History ==
MIPO was founded in 1978 by Dr. Lee Miringoff, former President of the National Council of Public Polls, as a poll on Dutchess County elections for a political science class he was teaching on voting behavior. MIPO was reportedly the first college-based survey center in the nation to involve undergraduates in the direct interaction and conducting of all its surveys.

While most of the polls are political in nature, MIPO does frequently conduct polls deemed to be in other areas of public interest. Other subjects commonly polled by MIPO include sports, economics, society and technology.

== Methodology ==
Marist polls are typically conducted through random digit dialing in a dual frame manner, contacting both cell phones and landlines, with cell phones comprising the majority of its national sample. Marist modifies the proportion of its frames for local polling, based on data from the National Health Interview Survey. Marist has also used a blend of phone, text, and online surveying for some polls. Marist's frames are primarily obtained from Dynata. Marist uses stratified sampling based on geography. Respondents are contacted through a Voxco computer-assisted telephone interviewing system by live interviewers, typically recruited from the undergraduate student body. Callbacks of phone contacts may be attempted depending on the result of an attempted call. As of 2024, a typical poll will see around a 1% response rate. Polls are typically conducted across 3 to 5 days.

Marist conducts weighting of survey results with US Census data on the variables of age, gender, income, race, and region. Likely voters are identified through a turnout model that incorporates their expressed chance of voting, interest in the election, and past election participation.

== Partnerships ==
In 2012, the Marist Poll teamed with NBC News and The Wall Street Journal to conduct surveys in key presidential battleground states. Consequently, MIPO accurately predicted the results of the presidential contest and U.S. Senate and governor races in each of these states. Other media institutions Marist has partnered with include Telemundo, McClatchy, NPR, PBS Newshour, and Yahoo News.

During the summer of 2013, MIPO announced they have conducted a survey on Performance-enhancing drugs (PEDs) in Major League Baseball. Specifically, the poll asked whether or not players linked to clinics that provide PEDs, such as Biogenesis, should be suspended—even if they did not fail a drug test. The second question asked if players who used PEDs should receive eligibility for the Hall of Fame.

On the October 22, 2013 edition of Real Sports that HBO's longtime, sports-themed monthly newsmagazine and the Marist Poll have launched a new, indefinite joint-polling initiative. Towards the end of the program on October 22, host Bryant Gumbel announced the results of a HBO Real Sports/Marist Poll: a comprehensive national survey conducted by the Marist Poll in mid-July, 2013 with more than 1,200 Americans over the age of 17 on the topic of concussions and brain trauma in football.

In 2015, Marist temporarily suspended polling of the candidates for nomination during the Democratic primaries and Republican primaries out of concern that polls were being inappropriately used to decide who was included and excluded from the primaries.

== See also ==
- The Phillips Academy Poll
- Quinnipiac University Polling Institute
- Emerson College Polling
- Suffolk University Political Research Center
- Franklin & Marshall College Poll
- Siena Research Institute
- Monmouth University Polling Institute
