= Yahoo News =

News aggregator from Yahoo!

- Website type: News
- Owner: Yahoo! Inc.
- Creator: Yahoo!
- Website: news.yahoo.com
- Commercial: Yes
- Registration: Optional
- Launched: August 1996; 30 years ago
- Current status: Active

Yahoo News (stylized as Yahoo! News) is an American news website and news aggregator operated by Yahoo. Created in August 1996 by Yahoo software engineer Brad Clawsie, the site compiles articles from a variety of media organizations, including the Associated Press, Reuters, CNN, ABC News, and BBC News.

Originally focused on aggregating news from external publishers, Yahoo News began producing original journalism in 2011 and joined the White House press corps in 2012.

== History ==
The site was created by Yahoo software engineer Brad Clawsie in August 1996. As of 2021, the site published content from more than 100 news partners.

In 2000, Yahoo News launched pages tracking the content on the site that was most viewed and most shared by email. The "most emailed" page in particular was noted as an innovation in online news aggregation. Yahoo News allows users to comment on articles. Between late 2006 and early 2010, comments were disabled in part due to moderation challenges.

By 2011, Yahoo had expanded its focus to include original content, as part of its plans to become a major media organization. The site hired veteran journalists and joined the White House press corps for the first time in February 2012. In May 2013, the site began integrating tweets into its streaming news feeds. In November 2013, Yahoo hired former Today Show and CBS Evening News anchor Katie Couric as Global Anchor of Yahoo News. She left in 2017.

Yahoo developed an application that collects the most-read news stories from different categories for iOS and Android. The app was one of the winners of 2014 Apple Design Awards.

In May 2021, Verizon announced it would sell Verizon Media, including Yahoo and AOL, to Apollo Global Management for about $5 billion, while retaining a 10% stake in the company, which would be renamed Yahoo after the deal. The transaction closed on September 1, 2021.

In September 2022, Yahoo News (which aggregates articles from many other sources) acquired The Factual, a startup that uses artificial intelligence to rate the credibility of individual articles. In March 2024, Yahoo News launched a creator program allowing writers to publish stories and earn revenue from them. In April 2024, Yahoo acquired the defunct news app Artifact, integrating its technology into a new Yahoo News mobile app.

=== Yahoo Celebrity ===
Yahoo Celebrity debuted as Yahoo OMG in June 2007, with content syndicated from Access Hollywood, Reuters, and the Associated Press. In July 2009, OMG was the most popular celebrity news site, with more than 20 million monthly visitors. The site launched in Europe in 2011.

In December 2012, Yahoo reached a deal with CBS Television Distribution to cross-promote its Entertainment Tonight spin-off The Insider with omg!, re-branding the show as omg! Insider. In January 2014, it was announced that CBS Television Distribution was to revert the name change back to The Insider while omg! would become Yahoo Celebrity.

== See also ==
- Apple News
- Google News
- Online newspaper
