= Opinion pollings on the Trump presidency =

Opinion polling on the Donald Trump administration may refer to:

- Opinion polling on the first Trump presidency, 2017–2021
- Opinion polling on the second Trump presidency, 2025–present
