= Presidency of Donald Trump =

List of US presidency articles

Presidency of Donald Trump may refer to:

- First presidency of Donald Trump, the United States presidential administration from 2017 to 2021
- Second presidency of Donald Trump, the United States presidential administration since 2025

== See also ==
- History of the United States (2016–present)
- Timeline of the Donald Trump presidencies
- First cabinet of Donald Trump (2017–2021)
- Second cabinet of Donald Trump (2025–present)
- First 100 days of the first Trump presidency, 2017
- First 100 days of the second Trump presidency, 2025
- First inauguration of Donald Trump, 2017
- Second inauguration of Donald Trump, 2025
- First presidential transition of Donald Trump (2016–2017)
- Second presidential transition of Donald Trump (2024–2025)
- Political appointments of the first Trump administration (2017–2021)
- Political appointments of the second Trump administration (2025–present)
- Opinion polling on the first Trump presidency (2017–2021)
- Opinion polling on the second Trump presidency (2025–present)
