= 2019 opinion polling on the Trump administration =

Surveying on 2017–2021 US presidency

This is a list of opinion polls taken on the First presidency of Donald Trump in 2019. Polls throughout the year revealed that more disapproved of Trump than approved of him, generally by a margin of between five and fifteen percentage points. The polls also revealed that the margin may have been stronger or weaker in some states, when compared with the national polls.

== December ==
Area polled	Segment polled	Polling group	Date	Approve	Disapprove	Unsure	Sample size	Polling method	Source(s)
United States	All adults	YouGov (for The Economist)	December 28–31, 2019	40%	52%	8%	1,500	online	
United States	All adults	YouGov (for The Economist)	December 22–24, 2019	40%	52%	9%	1,500	online	
United States	All adults	American Research Group	December 17–20, 2019	39%	57%	4%	1,100	telephone	
United States	All adults	Ipsos (for Reuters)	December 16–17, 2019	41%	53%	5%	1,117	online	
United States	All adults	NBC News/The Wall Street Journal	December 14–17, 2019	44%	54%	2%	900	telephone	
United States	All adults	YouGov (for The Economist)	December 14–17, 2019	40%	50%	10%	1,500	online	
United States	All adults	CNN	December 12–15, 2019	43%	53%	4%	1,005	telephone	
United States	Registered voters	Quinnipiac University	December 11–15, 2019	43%	52%	5%	1,390	telephone	
United States	All adults	Gallup	December 2–15, 2019	45%	51%	3%	1,025	telephone	
United States	Registered voters	Suffolk University/USA Today	December 10–14, 2019	48%	50%	2%	1,000	telephone	
United States	All adults	Investor's Business Daily	December 5–14, 2019	44%	52%	1%	905	telephone	
United States	All adults	CNBC	December 10–13, 2019	40%	49%	11%	800	telephone	
United States	All adults	NPR/PBS NewsHour/Marist	December 9–11, 2019	42%	52%	6%	1,774	telephone	
United States	Registered voters	Fox News	December 8–11, 2019	45%	53%	1%	1,000	telephone	
United States	All adults	Ipsos (for Reuters)	December 9–10, 2019	40%	54%	5%	1,116	online	
United States	All adults	YouGov (for The Economist)	December 7–10, 2019	42%	49%	9%	1,500	online	
United States	Registered voters	Quinnipiac University	December 4–9, 2019	41%	55%	4%	1,553	telephone	
Texas	All adults	CNN	December 4–8, 2019	42%	50%	8%	1,205	telephone	
United States	All adults	Monmouth University	December 4–8, 2019	43%	50%	8%	903	telephone	
Wisconsin	Registered voters	Marquette University Law School	December 3–8, 2019	47%	50%	2%	800	telephone	
Tennessee	Registered voters	Vanderbilt University	November 19 – December 5, 2019	50%	46%	2%	1,000	telephone	
United States	All adults	Ipsos (for Reuters)	December 2–3, 2019	39%	55%	6%	1,117	online	
United States	All adults	YouGov (for The Economist)	December 1–3, 2019	41%	50%	9%	1,500	online	

majority approve plurality approve majority disapprove plurality disapprove

== November ==
Area polled	Segment polled	Polling group	Date	Approve	Disapprove	Unsure	Sample size	Polling method	Source(s)
California	Registered voters	University of California, Berkeley	November 21–27, 2019	32%	68%	–	3,482	online	
United States	All adults	Ipsos (for Reuters)	November 25–26, 2019	41%	54%	5%	1,118	online	
United States	All adults	YouGov (for The Economist)	November 24–26, 2019	41%	52%	7%	1,500	online	
United States	Registered voters	Quinnipiac University	November 21–25, 2019	40%	54%	6%	1,355	telephone	
United States	All adults	CNN	November 21–24, 2019	42%	54%	4%	1,007	telephone	
Virginia	Registered voters	Christopher Newport University	November 11–22, 2019	42%	55%	3%	901	telephone	
United States	All adults	American Research Group	November 17–20, 2019	37%	60%	3%	1,100	telephone	
Virginia	All adults	Roanoke College	November 10–20, 2019	32%	51%	3%	609	telephone	
United States	All adults	Ipsos (for Reuters)	November 18–19, 2019	40%	55%	5%	1,116	online	
United States	All adults	YouGov (for The Economist)	November 17–19, 2019	39%	51%	9%	1,500	online	
Wisconsin	Registered voters	Marquette University Law School	November 13–17, 2019	47%	51%	1%	801	telephone	
United States	All adults	NPR/PBS NewsHour/Marist	November 11–15, 2019	41%	51%	7%	1,224	telephone	
Texas	Registered voters	University of Texas at Tyler	November 5–14, 2019	43%	49%	8%	1,026	telephone and online	
United States	All adults	Gallup	November 1–14, 2019	43%	54%	3%	1,015	telephone	
United States	All adults	Ipsos (for Reuters)	November 12–13, 2019	39%	58%	4%	1,116	online	
North Carolina	Registered voters	Fox News	November 10–13, 2019	47%	50%	2%	1,504	telephone	
United States	All adults	YouGov (for The Economist)	November 10–12, 2019	41%	50%	9%	1,500	online	
United States	All adults	Kaiser Family Foundation	November 7–12, 2019	41%	57%	2%	1,205	telephone	
California	All adults	Public Policy Institute of California	November 3–12, 2019	33%	63%	4%	1,689	telephone	
Pennsylvania	Registered voters	Muhlenberg College/The Morning Call	November 4–9, 2019	40%	56%	4%	410	telephone	
North Carolina	All adults	High Point University	November 1–7, 2019	40%	52%	8%	1,049	telephone and online	
United States	All adults	Ipsos (for Reuters)	November 4–5, 2019	40%	54%	5%	1,114	online	
United States	All adults	YouGov (for The Economist)	November 3–5, 2019	41%	50%	9%	1,500	online	
United States	All adults	Monmouth University	October 30 – November 3, 2019	43%	51%	6%	908	telephone	
Massachusetts	Registered voters	Western New England University	October 17 – November 1, 2019	25%	69%	6%	405	telephone	

majority approve plurality approve majority disapprove plurality disapprove

== October ==
Area polled	Segment polled	Polling group	Date	Approve	Disapprove	Unsure	Sample size	Polling method	Source(s)
United States	All adults	Investor's Business Daily	October 24–31, 2019	39%	56%	1%	903	telephone	
United States	All adults	Gallup	October 14–31, 2019	41%	57%	2%	1,506	telephone	
United States	Registered voters	Fox News	October 27–30, 2019	42%	57%	1%	1,040	telephone	
United States	All adults	NBC News/The Wall Street Journal	October 27–30, 2019	45%	53%	2%	900	telephone	
United States	All adults	ABC News/The Washington Post	October 27–30, 2019	38%	58%	5%	1,003	telephone	
United States	All adults	Ipsos (for Reuters)	October 28–29, 2019	40%	57%	3%	1,114	online	
United States	All adults	YouGov (for The Economist)	October 27–29, 2019	40%	53%	8%	1,500	online	
Indiana	All adults	Ball State University	October 8–28, 2019	52%	40%	8%	600	telephone	
New Hampshire	All adults	University of New Hampshire/CNN	October 21–27, 2019	44%	52%	4%	1,256	telephone	
United States	Registered voters	Suffolk University/USA Today	October 23–26, 2019	46%	52%	2%	1,000	telephone	
Arkansas	All adults	University of Arkansas	October 12–24, 2019	50%	45%	5%	811	telephone	
United States	All adults	Grinnell College	October 17–23, 2019	40%	50%	10%	1,003	telephone	
United States	All adults	YouGov (for The Economist)	October 20–22, 2019	42%	49%	9%	1,500	online	
United States	All adults	Ipsos (for Reuters)	October 18–22, 2019	39%	55%	6%	4,083	online	
United States	Registered voters	Quinnipiac University	October 17–21, 2019	38%	58%	5%	1,587	telephone	
United States	All adults	CNN	October 17–20, 2019	41%	57%	2%	1,003	telephone	
United States	All adults	American Research Group	October 17–20, 2019	37%	59%	4%	1,100	telephone	
Mississippi	Likely voters	Mason-Dixon Polling & Strategy	October 17–19, 2019	54%	42%	4%	625	telephone	
Wisconsin	Registered voters	Marquette University Law School	October 13–17, 2019	46%	51%	2%	799	telephone	
Minnesota	Registered voters	Star Tribune	October 14–16, 2019	40%	56%	4%	800	telephone	
United States	All adults	Ipsos (for Reuters)	October 14–15, 2019	40%	54%	6%	1,115	online	
United States	All adults	YouGov (for The Economist)	October 13–15, 2019	39%	51%	10%	1,500	online	
United States	Registered voters	Quinnipiac University	October 11–13, 2019	41%	54%	5%	1,195	telephone	
United States	All adults	Public Religion Research Institute	October 10–13, 2019	43%	56%	1%	1,032	telephone and online	
United States	All adults	Gallup	October 1–13, 2019	39%	57%	5%	1,526	telephone	
United States	Likely voters	Georgetown Institute of Politics and Public Service	October 6–10, 2019	43%	53%	3%	1,000	telephone	
United States	All adults	Ipsos (for Reuters)	October 7–8, 2019	39%	55%	6%	1,118	online	
United States	Registered voters	Fox News	October 6–8, 2019	43%	55%	1%	1,003	telephone	
United States	All adults	YouGov (for The Economist)	October 6–8, 2019	43%	49%	8%	1,500	online	
United States	All adults	Kaiser Family Foundation	October 3–8, 2019	42%	56%	2%	1,205	telephone	
United States	All adults	NPR/PBS NewsHour/Marist	October 3–8, 2019	42%	52%	5%	1,123	telephone	
United States	Registered voters	Quinnipiac University	October 4–7, 2019	40%	54%	6%	1,483	telephone	
United States	All adults	NBC News/The Wall Street Journal	October 4–6, 2019	43%	53%	4%	800	telephone	
United States	All adults	Investor's Business Daily	September 26 – October 3, 2019	43%	54%	1%	900	telephone	
Wisconsin	Registered voters	Fox News	September 29 – October 2, 2019	44%	54%	2%	1,512	telephone	
New Jersey	All adults	Fairleigh Dickinson University	September 26 – October 2, 2019	34%	57%	8%	801	telephone	
United States	All adults	Ipsos (for Reuters)	September 30 – October 1, 2019	40%	55%	5%	1,121	online	
United States	All adults	YouGov (for The Economist)	September 28 – October 1, 2019	41%	50%	9%	1,500	online	

majority approve plurality approve majority disapprove plurality disapprove

== September ==
Area polled	Segment polled	Polling group	Date	Approve	Disapprove	Unsure	Sample size	Polling method	Source(s)
Virginia	All adults	The Washington Post/Schar School of Policy and Government	September 25–30, 2019	39%	58%	3%	876	telephone	
United States	All adults	Gallup	September 16–30, 2019	40%	56%	3%	2,431	telephone	
Virginia	Registered voters	Christopher Newport University	September 4–30, 2019	37%	61%	2%	726	telephone	
United States	Registered voters	Quinnipiac University	September 27–29, 2019	41%	53%	6%	1,115	telephone	
United States	All adults	Monmouth University	September 23–29, 2019	41%	53%	6%	1,161	telephone	
United States	All adults	CNBC	September 24–28, 2019	37%	53%	10%	800	telephone	
South Carolina	All adults	CNN	September 22–26, 2019	49%	47%	4%	1,200	telephone	
United States	All adults	NPR/PBS NewsHour/Marist	September 25, 2019	44%	53%	3%	864	telephone	
United States	All adults	Ipsos (for Reuters)	September 24–25, 2019	40%	53%	7%	1,117	online	
California	All adults	Public Policy Institute of California	September 16–25, 2019	30%	66%	4%	1,680	telephone	
United States	All adults	YouGov (for The Economist)	September 22–24, 2019	41%	50%	9%	1,500	online	
United States	Registered voters	Quinnipiac University	September 19–23, 2019	40%	55%	5%	1,337	telephone	
United States	All adults	American Research Group	September 17–20, 2019	40%	58%	2%	1,100	telephone	
North Carolina	All adults	High Point University	September 13–19, 2019	42%	50%	8%	1,030	telephone and online	
Maryland	All adults	Goucher College	September 13–18, 2019	27%	67%	4%	763	telephone	
United States	All adults	Ipsos (for Reuters)	September 16–17, 2019	40%	55%	5%	1,116	online	
United States	Registered voters	Fox News	September 15–17, 2019	45%	54%	1%	1,008	telephone	
United States	All adults	YouGov (for The Economist)	September 14–17, 2019	41%	49%	9%	1,500	online	
United States	Registered voters	NBC News/The Wall Street Journal	September 13–16, 2019	45%	53%	2%	900	telephone	
New Jersey	Registered voters	Monmouth University	September 12–16, 2019	37%	56%	7%	651	telephone	
Virginia	All adults	University of Mary Washington	September 3–15, 2019	39%	54%	7%	1,009	telephone	
United States	All adults	Gallup	September 3–15, 2019	43%	54%	4%	1,525	telephone	
United States	All adults	Pew Research Center	September 3–15, 2019	40%	59%	1%	9,895	online	
United States	All adults	Public Religion Research Institute	August 22 – September 15, 2019	39%	60%	–	2,527	telephone and online	
United States	All adults	Marquette University Law School	September 3–13, 2019	40%	60%	–	1,423	online	
United States	All adults	Ipsos (for Reuters)	September 9–10, 2019	43%	53%	5%	1,116	online	
United States	All adults	YouGov (for The Economist)	September 8–10, 2019	42%	50%	8%	1,500	online	
United States	All adults	CNN	September 5–9, 2019	39%	55%	6%	1,639	telephone	
Texas	Registered voters	Quinnipiac University	September 4–9, 2019	45%	50%	6%	1,410	telephone	
United States	All adults	NPR/PBS NewsHour/Marist	September 5–8, 2019	41%	54%	5%	1,317	telephone	
United States	All adults	Kaiser Family Foundation	September 3–8, 2019	41%	54%	5%	1,205	telephone	
United States	All adults	ABC News/The Washington Post	September 2–5, 2019	38%	56%	6%	1,003	telephone	
United States	All adults	Ipsos (for Reuters)	September 3–4, 2019	40%	54%	5%	1,116	online	
United States	All adults	YouGov (for The Economist)	September 1–3, 2019	43%	49%	9%	1,500	online	

majority approve plurality approve majority disapprove plurality disapprove

== August ==
Area polled	Segment polled	Polling group	Date	Approve	Disapprove	Unsure	Sample size	Polling method	Source(s)
United States	All adults	Investor's Business Daily	August 22–30, 2019	39%	55%	1%	903	telephone	
Wisconsin	Registered voters	Marquette University Law School	August 25–29, 2019	45%	53%	1%	800	telephone	
United States	All adults	Ipsos (for Reuters)	August 26–27, 2019	39%	57%	4%	1,115	online	
United States	All adults	YouGov (for The Economist)	August 24–27, 2019	42%	49%	10%	1,500	online	
United States	Registered voters	Quinnipiac University	August 21–26, 2019	38%	56%	6%	1,422	telephone	
United States	Registered voters	Suffolk University/USA Today	August 20–25, 2019	44%	54%	2%	1,000	telephone	
United States	All adults	Ipsos (for Reuters)	August 19–20, 2019	41%	55%	4%	1,117	online	
United States	All adults	American Research Group	August 17–20, 2019	41%	55%	4%	1,100	telephone	
United States	All adults	YouGov (for The Economist)	August 17–20, 2019	41%	50%	8%	1,500	online	
United States	All adults	Monmouth University	August 16–20, 2019	40%	53%	7%	800	telephone	
Virginia	Likely voters	Roanoke College	August 11–19, 2019	27%	53%	3%	556	telephone	
United States	All adults	CNN	August 15–18, 2019	40%	54%	6%	1,001	telephone	
United States	All adults	NBC News/The Wall Street Journal	August 10–14, 2019	43%	55%	2%	1,000	telephone	
United States	All adults	Gallup	August 1–14, 2019	41%	54%	5%	1,522	telephone	
United States	All adults	Ipsos (for Reuters)	August 12–13, 2019	42%	52%	7%	1,116	online	
United States	Registered voters	Fox News	August 11–13, 2019	43%	56%	1%	1,013	telephone	
United States	All adults	YouGov (for The Economist)	August 10–13, 2019	41%	50%	9%	1,500	online	
New Hampshire	All adults	University of New Hampshire	July 29 – August 8, 2019	42%	53%	5%	489	telephone	
United States	All adults	YouGov (for The Economist)	August 3–6, 2019	41%	49%	10%	1,500	online	
United States	All adults	Ipsos (for Reuters)	August 1–5, 2019	41%	54%	5%	2,129	online	
United States	All adults	The Washington Post/Kaiser Family Foundation	July 9 – August 5, 2019	37%	63%	–	2,293	telephone and online	
United States	All adults	Pew Research Center	July 22 – August 4, 2019	40%	59%	1%	4,175	online	
United States	All adults	Investor's Business Daily	July 25 – August 1, 2019	40%	56%	2%	902	telephone	

majority approve plurality approve majority disapprove plurality disapprove

== July ==
Area polled	Segment polled	Polling group	Date	Approve	Disapprove	Unsure	Sample size	Polling method	Source(s)
United States	All adults	Gallup	July 15–31, 2019	42%	54%	4%	3,038	telephone	
United States	All adults	Ipsos (for Reuters)	July 29–30, 2019	39%	57%	4%	1,115	online	
United States	All adults	YouGov (for The Economist)	July 27–30, 2019	41%	52%	7%	1,500	online	
United States	Registered voters	Quinnipiac University	July 25–28, 2019	40%	54%	6%	1,306	telephone	
United States	All adults	Ipsos (for Reuters)	July 22–23, 2019	41%	56%	3%	1,118	online	
United States	Registered voters	Fox News	July 21–23, 2019	46%	51%	3%	1,004	telephone	
United States	All adults	YouGov (for The Economist)	July 21–23, 2019	41%	51%	9%	1,500	online	
United States	All adults	Kaiser Family Foundation	July 18–23, 2019	44%	52%	4%	1,196	telephone	
California	All adults	Public Policy Institute of California	July 14–23, 2019	32%	62%	5%	1,692	telephone	
Ohio	Registered voters	Quinnipiac University	July 17–22, 2019	43%	52%	5%	1,431	telephone	
United States	All adults	American Research Group	July 17–20, 2019	41%	56%	3%	1,100	telephone	
United States	All adults	NPR/PBS NewsHour/Marist	July 15–17, 2019	44%	52%	5%	1,346	telephone	
United States	All adults	Ipsos (for Reuters)	July 15–16, 2019	41%	55%	4%	1,113	online	
United States	All adults	YouGov (for The Economist)	July 14–16, 2019	44%	48%	8%	1,500	online	
New Hampshire	All adults	University of New Hampshire/CNN	July 8–15, 2019	45%	51%	4%	855	telephone	
United States	All adults	Gallup	July 1–12, 2019	44%	51%	5%	1,525	telephone	
United States	All adults	Ipsos (for Reuters)	July 8–9, 2019	41%	54%	4%	1,115	online	
United States	All adults	YouGov (for The Economist)	July 7–9, 2019	40%	51%	9%	1,500	online	
United States	Registered voters	NBC News/The Wall Street Journal	July 7–9, 2019	45%	52%	3%	800	telephone	
United States	All adults	YouGov (for The Economist)	June 30 – July 2, 2019	41%	49%	9%	1,500	online	
United States	All adults	Ipsos (for Reuters)	June 28 – July 2, 2019	41%	55%	4%	2,221	online	
United States	All adults	ABC News/The Washington Post	June 28 – July 1, 2019	44%	53%	3%	1,008	telephone	

majority approve plurality approve majority disapprove plurality disapprove

== June ==
Area polled	Segment polled	Polling group	Date	Approve	Disapprove	Unsure	Sample size	Polling method	Source(s)
United States	All adults	CNN	June 28–30, 2019	43%	52%	5%	1,613	telephone	
United States	All adults	Gallup	June 19–30, 2019	41%	54%	5%	1,018	telephone	
United States	All adults	Investor's Business Daily	June 20–27, 2019	43%	49%	1%	900	telephone	
United States	All adults	Ipsos (for Reuters)	June 24–25, 2019	41%	55%	4%	1,115	online	
United States	All adults	YouGov (for The Economist)	June 22–25, 2019	42%	48%	10%	1,500	online	
United States	All adults	American Research Group	June 17–20, 2019	42%	55%	3%	1,100	telephone	
United States	All adults	Ipsos (for Reuters)	June 17–18, 2019	41%	57%	2%	1,027	online	
United States	All adults	YouGov (for The Economist)	June 16–18, 2019	43%	49%	9%	1,500	online	
United States	All adults	Monmouth University	June 12–17, 2019	41%	50%	9%	751	telephone	
Florida	Registered voters	Quinnipiac University	June 12–17, 2019	44%	51%	5%	1,279	telephone	
United States	All adults	Gallup	June 3–16, 2019	43%	55%	3%	1,015	telephone	
United States	Registered voters	Suffolk University/USA Today	June 11–15, 2019	49%	48%	3%	1,000	telephone	
United States	Registered voters	Fox News	June 9–12, 2019	45%	53%	3%	1,001	telephone	
United States	All adults	Ipsos (for Reuters)	June 10–11, 2019	40%	57%	2%	1,119	online	
United States	All adults	YouGov (for The Economist)	June 9–11, 2019	42%	49%	8%	1,500	online	
United States	All adults	NBC News/The Wall Street Journal	June 8–11, 2019	44%	53%	3%	1,000	telephone	
United States	Registered voters	Quinnipiac University	June 6–10, 2019	42%	53%	5%	1,214	telephone	
United States	All adults	Investor's Business Daily	May 30 – June 7, 2019	42%	52%	2%	906	telephone	
United States	All adults	Ipsos (for Reuters)	May 29 – June 5, 2019	39%	57%	3%	4,416	online	
United States	All adults	YouGov (for The Economist)	June 2–4, 2019	42%	50%	9%	1,500	online	
United States	All adults	NPR/PBS NewsHour/Marist	May 31 – June 4, 2019	41%	49%	10%	944	telephone	
United States	All adults	Kaiser Family Foundation	May 30 – June 4, 2019	43%	55%	2%	1,206	telephone	

majority approve plurality approve majority disapprove plurality disapprove

== May ==
Area polled	Segment polled	Polling group	Date	Approve	Disapprove	Unsure	Sample size	Polling method	Source(s)
United States	All adults	CNN	May 28–31, 2019	43%	52%	5%	1,006	telephone	
United States	All adults	Gallup	May 15–30, 2019	40%	55%	4%	1,017	telephone	
United States	All adults	Ipsos (for Reuters)	May 28–29, 2019	41%	57%	3%	1,117	online	
United States	All adults	YouGov (for The Economist)	May 26–28, 2019	42%	49%	9%	1,500	online	
California	All adults	Public Policy Institute of California	May 19–28, 2019	34%	61%	4%	1,696	telephone	
United States	All adults	CNBC	May 22–26, 2019	40%	50%	10%	800	telephone	
Tennessee	Registered voters	Vanderbilt University	May 9–23, 2019	54%	44%	1%	1,000	telephone	
United States	All adults	YouGov (for The Economist)	May 18–21, 2019	41%	51%	7%	1,500	online	
United States	All adults	CBS News	May 17–20, 2019	41%	52%	6%	1,101	telephone	
United States	All adults	American Research Group	May 17–20, 2019	40%	56%	4%	1,100	telephone	
United States	All adults	Ipsos (for Reuters)	May 17–20, 2019	41%	56%	3%	1,007	online	
United States	All adults	Monmouth University	May 16–20, 2019	40%	52%	8%	802	telephone	
United States	Registered voters	Quinnipiac University	May 16–20, 2019	38%	57%	5%	1,078	telephone	
United States	All adults	YouGov (for The Economist)	May 12–14, 2019	39%	50%	10%	1,500	online	
United States	Registered voters	Fox News	May 11–14, 2019	46%	53%	1%	1,008	telephone	
United States	All adults	Ipsos (for Reuters)	May 10–14, 2019	39%	55%	6%	2,010	online	
Pennsylvania	Registered voters	Quinnipiac University	May 9–14, 2019	42%	54%	4%	978	telephone	
United States	All adults	Pew Research Center	April 29 – May 13, 2019	40%	59%	1%	10,170	online	
United States	All adults	Gallup	May 1–12, 2019	42%	52%	6%	1,009	telephone	
United States	All adults	Ipsos (for Reuters)	May 6–7, 2019	39%	55%	5%	1,006	online	
United States	All adults	YouGov (for The Economist)	May 5–7, 2019	42%	48%	9%	1,500	online	
United States	All adults	Investor's Business Daily	April 26 – May 5, 2019	43%	50%	1%	900	telephone	
United States	All adults	NBC News/The Wall Street Journal	April 28 – May 1, 2019	46%	51%	3%	900	telephone	

majority approve plurality approve majority disapprove plurality disapprove

== April ==
Area polled	Segment polled	Polling group	Date	Approve	Disapprove	Unsure	Sample size	Polling method	Source(s)
United States	All adults	Ipsos (for Reuters)	April 29–30, 2019	39%	56%	5%	1,004	online	
United States	All adults	YouGov (for The Economist)	April 27–30, 2019	42%	50%	9%	1,500	online	
United States	All adults	Gallup	April 17–30, 2019	46%	50%	4%	1,024	telephone	
United States	Registered voters	Quinnipiac University	April 26–29, 2019	41%	55%	5%	1,044	telephone	
United States	All adults	NPR/PBS NewsHour/Marist	April 24–29, 2019	41%	53%	6%	1,017	telephone	
United States	All adults	CNN	April 25–28, 2019	43%	52%	5%	1,007	telephone	
New Hampshire	Likely voters	Suffolk University/The Boston Globe	April 25–28, 2019	41%	53%	6%	800	telephone	
United States	All adults	ABC News/The Washington Post	April 22–25, 2019	39%	54%	6%	1,001	telephone	
United States	All adults	YouGov (for The Economist)	April 21–23, 2019	42%	50%	8%	1,500	online	
United States	All adults	Ipsos (for Reuters)	April 17–23, 2019	40%	53%	7%	4,018	online	
United States	All adults	American Research Group	April 17–20, 2019	39%	57%	4%	1,100	telephone	
New Hampshire	All adults	University of New Hampshire	April 10–18, 2019	41%	54%	5%	541	telephone	
United States	All adults	Ipsos (for Reuters)	April 15–16, 2019	40%	56%	3%	1,006	online	
United States	Registered voters	Fox News	April 14–16, 2019	45%	51%	4%	1,005	telephone	
United States	All adults	YouGov (for The Economist)	April 13–16, 2019	41%	50%	9%	1,500	online	
United States	All adults	Kaiser Family Foundation	April 11–16, 2019	41%	55%	3%	1,203	telephone	
United States	All adults	Monmouth University	April 11–15, 2019	40%	54%	6%	801	telephone	
United States	All adults	YouGov (for The Economist)	April 6–9, 2019	39%	51%	10%	1,500	online	
United States	All adults	Ipsos (for Reuters)	April 5–9, 2019	39%	56%	5%	2,667	online	
United States	All adults	Gallup	April 1–9, 2019	45%	51%	4%	1,012	telephone	
Wisconsin	Registered voters	Marquette University Law School	April 3–7, 2019	46%	52%	1%	800	telephone	
United States	All adults	Investor's Business Daily	March 28 – April 6, 2019	41%	52%	---	902	telephone	
United States	Likely voters	Georgetown Institute of Politics and Public Service	March 31 – April 4, 2019	43%	52%	5%	1,000	telephone	
North Carolina	All adults	High Point University#HPU Poll/High Point University	March 29 – April 4, 2019	40%	52%	8%	841	telephone and online	
United States	All adults	YouGov (for The Economist)	March 31 – April 2, 2019	42%	50%	8%	1,500	online	
United States	All adults	Ipsos (for Reuters)	March 26 – April 1, 2019	42%	53%	5%	3,962	online	

majority approve plurality approve majority disapprove plurality disapprove

== March ==
Area polled	Segment polled	Polling group	Date	Approve	Disapprove	Unsure	Sample size	Polling method	Source(s)
United States	All adults	NPR/PBS NewsHour/Marist	March 25–27, 2019	42%	51%	8%	938	telephone	
United States	All adults	NBC News/The Wall Street Journal	March 23–27, 2019	43%	53%	4%	1,000	telephone	
United States	All adults	YouGov (for The Economist)	March 24–26, 2019	43%	49%	8%	1,500	online	
United States	All adults	Ipsos (for Reuters)	March 20–26, 2019	42%	52%	6%	4,603	online	
United States	Registered voters	Quinnipiac University	March 21–25, 2019	39%	55%	5%	1,358	telephone	
United States	All adults	Pew Research Center	March 20–25, 2019	40%	55%	5%	1,503	telephone	
United States	All adults	CNBC	March 18–21, 2019	40%	49%	11%	801	telephone	
United States	Registered voters	Fox News	March 17–20, 2019	46%	51%	2%	1,002	telephone	
United States	All adults	American Research Group	March 17–20, 2019	41%	55%	4%	1,100	telephone	
United States	All adults	YouGov (for The Economist)	March 17–19, 2019	39%	53%	8%	1,500	online	
United States	All adults	Ipsos (for Reuters)	March 13–19, 2019	39%	55%	5%	2,222	online	
California	All adults	Public Policy Institute of California	March 10–19, 2019	29%	67%	4%	1,691	telephone	
United States	All adults	Kaiser Family Foundation	March 13–18, 2019	40%	57%	3%	1,211	telephone	
(New York (state)) New York	Registered voters	Quinnipiac University	March 13–18, 2019	28%	68%	4%	1,216	telephone	
United States	All adults	CNN	March 14–17, 2019	42%	51%	8%	1,003	telephone	
United States	Registered voters	Suffolk University/USA Today	March 13–17, 2019	48%	49%	3%	1,000	telephone	
United States	All adults	YouGov (for The Economist)	March 10–12, 2019	42%	50%	8%	1,500	online	
United States	All adults	Ipsos (for Reuters)	March 6–12, 2019	41%	54%	5%	2,207	online	
South Carolina	All adults	Winthrop University	February 17 – March 12, 2019	42%	49%	7%	1,007	telephone	
United States	All adults	Gallup	March 1–10, 2019	39%	57%	4%	1,039	telephone	
United States	All adults	YouGov (for The Economist)	March 3–5, 2019	43%	48%	9%	1,500	online	
United States	All adults	Ipsos (for Reuters)	February 27 – March 5, 2019	39%	56%	5%	3,269	online	
United States	All adults	Monmouth University	March 1–4, 2019	44%	51%	5%	802	telephone	
United States	Registered voters	Quinnipiac University	March 1–4, 2019	38%	55%	6%	1,120	telephone	
United States	All adults	Investor's Business Daily	February 21 – March 2, 2019	41%	53%	3%	907	telephone	
Maryland	Registered voters	Gonzales Research & Media Services	February 22 – March 1, 2019	38%	60%	2%	817	telephone	

majority approve plurality approve majority disapprove plurality disapprove

== February ==
Area polled	Segment polled	Polling group	Date	Approve	Disapprove	Unsure	Sample size	Polling method	Source(s)
United States	All adults	Gallup	February 12–28, 2019	43%	54%	3%	1,932	telephone	
United States	All adults	NBC News/The Wall Street Journal	February 24–27, 2019	46%	52%	2%	900	telephone	
United States	All adults	YouGov (for The Economist)	February 24–26, 2019	40%	51%	9%	1,500	online	
United States	All adults	Ipsos (for Reuters)	February 20–26, 2019	41%	55%	5%	3,514	online	
New Hampshire	All adults	University of New Hampshire	February 18–26, 2019	43%	53%	3%	599	telephone	
Texas	Registered voters	Quinnipiac University	February 20–25, 2019	47%	50%	4%	1,222	telephone	
United States	All adults	Kaiser Family Foundation	February 14–24, 2019	38%	56%	5%	1,440	telephone	
United States	All adults	American Research Group	February 17–20, 2019	44%	53%	3%	1,100	telephone	
Virginia	All adults	Roanoke College	February 10–20, 2019	38%	48%	14%	598	telephone	
United States	All adults	YouGov (for The Economist)	February 17–19, 2019	44%	48%	8%	1,500	online	
United States	All adults	Ipsos (for Reuters)	February 13–19, 2019	41%	55%	4%	3,322	online	
Virginia	Registered voters	Quinnipiac University	February 14–18, 2019	36%	59%	5%	1,150	telephone	
Iowa	All adults	The Des Moines Register/Mediacom	February 10–13, 2019	46%	50%	4%	803	telephone	
United States	Registered voters	Fox News	February 10–12, 2019	46%	52%	2%	1,004	telephone	
United States	All adults	YouGov (for The Economist)	February 10–12, 2019	40%	52%	8%	1,500	online	
Maryland	All adults	Goucher College	February 7–12, 2019	30%	66%	3%	808	telephone	
United States	All adults	Ipsos (for Reuters)	February 6–12, 2019	39%	57%	4%	2,240	online	
North Carolina	All adults	High Point University#HPU Poll/High Point University	February 4–11, 2019	40%	53%	8%	873	telephone and online	
New Jersey	All adults	Monmouth University	February 8–10, 2019	37%	58%	5%	604	telephone	
United States	All adults	Gallup	February 1–10, 2019	44%	52%	4%	1,016	telephone	
United States	All adults	YouGov (for The Economist)	February 2–5, 2019	40%	52%	8%	1,500	online	
United States	All adults	Ipsos (for Reuters)	January 30 – February 5, 2019	38%	57%	5%	2,470	online	
California	Registered voters	Quinnipiac University	January 30 – February 4, 2019	28%	67%	4%	912	telephone	
United States	All adults	CNN	January 30 – February 2, 2019	40%	55%	5%	1,011	telephone	
United States	All adults	Investor's Business Daily	January 24 – February 1, 2019	39%	57%	---	905	telephone	

majority approve plurality approve majority disapprove plurality disapprove

== January ==
Area polled	Segment polled	Polling group	Date	Approve	Disapprove	Unsure	Sample size	Polling method	Source(s)
United States	All adults	YouGov (for The Economist)	January 27–29, 2019	37%	53%	9%	1,500	online	
United States	All adults	Ipsos (for Reuters)	January 23–29, 2019	39%	56%	4%	2,958	online	
California	All adults	Public Policy Institute of California	January 20–29, 2019	30%	67%	3%	1,688	telephone	
United States	Registered voters	Quinnipiac University	January 25–28, 2019	38%	57%	5%	1,004	telephone	
United States	All adults	Monmouth University	January 25–27, 2019	41%	54%	5%	805	telephone	
United States	All adults	Gallup	January 21–27, 2019	37%	59%	3%	1,500	telephone	
Michigan	Likely voters	WDIV-TV/The Detroit News	January 24–26, 2019	44%	52%	4%	600	telephone	
United States	All adults	ABC News/The Washington Post	January 21–24, 2019	37%	58%	5%	1,001	telephone	
United States	All adults	NBC News/The Wall Street Journal	January 20–23, 2019	43%	54%	3%	900	telephone	
United States	Registered voters	Fox News	January 20–22, 2019	43%	54%	2%	1,008	telephone	
United States	All adults	YouGov (for The Economist)	January 20–22, 2019	40%	52%	8%	1,500	online	
United States	All adults	Ipsos (for Reuters)	January 16–22, 2019	40%	55%	5%	2,274	online	
United States	Registered voters	Public Policy Polling	January 19–21, 2019	40%	57%	3%	760	telephone and online	
United States	All adults	CBS News	January 18–21, 2019	36%	59%	5%	1,102	telephone	
(New York (state)) New York	Registered voters	Quinnipiac University	January 16–21, 2019	29%	67%	4%	929	telephone	
United States	All adults	American Research Group	January 17–20, 2019	41%	54%	5%	1,100	telephone	
Wisconsin	Registered voters	Marquette University Law School	January 16–20, 2019	44%	52%	4%	800	telephone	
United States	All adults	YouGov (for The Economist)	January 12–15, 2019	41%	52%	8%	1,500	online	
United States	All adults	Ipsos (for Reuters)	January 9–15, 2019	41%	55%	4%	3,363	online	
United States	All adults	Kaiser Family Foundation	January 9–14, 2019	38%	59%	3%	1,190	telephone	
United States	All adults	Pew Research Center	January 9–14, 2019	37%	59%	3%	1,505	telephone	
United States	All adults	NPR/PBS NewsHour/Marist	January 10–13, 2019	39%	53%	8%	1,023	telephone	
United States	Registered voters	Quinnipiac University	January 9–13, 2019	41%	55%	3%	1,209	telephone	
United States	All adults	Investor's Business Daily	January 3–12, 2019	42%	54%	2%	903	telephone	
United States	All adults	CNN	January 10–11, 2019	37%	57%	7%	848	telephone	
United States	All adults	YouGov (for The Economist)	January 6–8, 2019	40%	51%	10%	1,500	online	
United States	All adults	Ipsos (for Reuters)	January 2–8, 2019	40%	55%	5%	2,201	online	
Maryland	Registered voters	Gonzales Research & Media Services	December 28, 2018 – January 4, 2019	34%	64%	3%	809	telephone	
United States	All adults	YouGov (for The Economist)	December 30, 2018 – January 1, 2019	42%	51%	7%	1,500	online	
United States	All adults	Ipsos (for Reuters)	December 26, 2018 – January 1, 2019	41%	54%	5%	2,482	online	

majority approve plurality approve majority disapprove plurality disapprove

== See also ==
- Opinion polling on an Impeachment inquiry against Donald Trump
