= Opinion polling on the first Trump presidency =

Surveying on 2017–2021 US administration

This article summarizes the results of polls taken during the first presidency of Donald Trump which gather and analyze public opinion on his administration's performance and policies.

== Graphical summary ==
Gallup approval polling Disapprove Unsure Approve

== Job approval ratings ==
According to Gallup, Donald Trump’s average job approval rating for his first term was 41%, the lowest average rating recorded for any president since Gallup began asking the question in 1945. Trump also never reached a Gallup approval rating higher than 49% – meaning there was no point in Trump’s first term where a majority of Americans polled approved of his job as president. As of December 2025, this has also held true for Trump’s second administration, as Gallup reports his highest second term approval rating was 47% at his inauguration in January 2025.

In a larger context, Trump's approval rating (Gallup polling) after the first year of his first term was the lowest to date of any president since 1977, exceeded only by the rating of his second term's first year.

=== Aggregate polls ===
Poll numbers verified as of January 15, 2021

Aggregator	Segment polled	Approve	Disapprove
FiveThirtyEight	All polls	38.1%	58.0%
FiveThirtyEight	Likely/registered voters	39.7%	56.5%
FiveThirtyEight	All adults	36.7%	59.4%
RealClearPolitics	All polls	39.7%	57.7%

== Comparative favorability ratings ==
=== vs. Barack Obama ===
Area polled	Segment polled	Polling group	Date	Donald Trump favorable	Barack Obama favorable	Sample size	Polling method	Source
(Georgia (U.S. state)) Georgia	Likely Voters	AtlasIntel	December 25, 2020–January 1, 2021	47%	52%	1,680	telephone and online	
United States	Registered voters	NBC News/Wall Street Journal	August 9–12, 2020	40%	54%	900	telephone	
Wisconsin	Registered voters	Marquette University Law School	June 14–18, 2020	42%	61%	805	telephone	
United States	Registered voters	NBC News/Wall Street Journal	May 28 – June 2, 2020	40%	57%	1,000	telephone	
United States	Registered voters	Fox News	May 17–20, 2020	43%	63%	1,207	telephone	
United States	Registered voters	Monmouth University	April 30 – May 4, 2020	40%	57%	739	telephone	
Wisconsin	Registered voters	Marquette University Law School	November 13–17, 2019	46%	54%	801	telephone	
United States	All adults	Grinnell College	October 17–23, 2019	42%	61%	1,003	telephone	
United States	Registered voters	NBC News/Wall Street Journal	September 13–16, 2019	41%	54%	900	telephone	
United States	Registered voters	Fox News	August 11–13, 2019	42%	60%	1,013	telephone	
United States	Registered voters	NBC News/Wall Street Journal	September 16–19, 2018	39%	54%	900	telephone	
(New York (state)) New York	Registered voters	Siena College Research Institute	February 5–8, 2018	33%	67%	823	telephone	
United States	All adults	CNN	January 14–18, 2018	40%	66%	1,005	telephone	
United States	All adults	NBC News/Wall Street Journal	January 13–17, 2018	36%	57%	900	telephone	
Michigan	All adults	NBC News/Marist	August 13–17, 2017	34%	64%	907	telephone	
United States	All adults	NBC News/Wall Street Journal	August 5–9, 2017	36%	51%	1,200	telephone	
United States	All adults	Bloomberg News	July 8–12, 2017	41%	61%	1,001	telephone	
United States	All adults	NBC News/Wall Street Journal	April 17–20, 2017	39%	52%	900	telephone	
United States	All adults	Ipsos (for Reuters)	April 13–17, 2017	47%	62%	1,843	online	
United States	All adults	Ipsos (for Reuters)	March 24–28, 2017	51%	64%	1,646	online	
United States	All adults	Pew Research Center	February 28 – March 12, 2017	43%	60%	3,844	telephone and online	
United States	All adults	YouGov (for The Economist)	January 23–25, 2017	45%	54%	2,692	online	

Trump more favorable Obama more favorable

=== vs. Chuck Schumer ===
Area polled	Segment polled	Polling group	Date	Donald Trump favorable	Chuck Schumer favorable	Sample size	Polling method	Source(s)
United States	All adults	Gallup	February 17–28, 2020	46%	31%	1,020	telephone	
(New York (state)) New York	Registered voters	Siena College Research Institute	January 11–16, 2020	31%	54%	814	telephone	
(New York (state)) New York	Registered voters	Siena College Research Institute	September 8–12, 2019	32%	48%	798	telephone	
(New York (state)) New York	Registered voters	Siena College Research Institute	July 28 – August 1, 2019	35%	53%	810	telephone	
(New York (state)) New York	Registered voters	Siena College Research Institute	June 2–6, 2019	34%	54%	812	telephone	
(New York (state)) New York	Registered voters	Siena College Research Institute	April 8–11, 2019	38%	49%	735	telephone	
(New York (state)) New York	Registered voters	Siena College Research Institute	March 10–14, 2019	36%	51%	700	telephone	
(New York (state)) New York	Registered voters	Siena College Research Institute	February 4–7, 2019	35%	47%	778	telephone	
United States	All adults	Gallup	January 21–27, 2019	39%	33%	1,022	telephone	
United States	Registered voters	Quinnipiac University	January 9–13, 2019	41%	26%	1,209	telephone	
(New York (state)) New York	Registered voters	Siena College Research Institute	January 6–10, 2019	32%	53%	805	telephone	
United States	All adults	Gallup	December 3–12, 2018	40%	32%	1,025	telephone	
United States	Registered voters	Fox News	December 9–11, 2018	46%	28%	1,006	telephone	
United States	Registered voters	Fox News	August 19–21, 2018	41%	28%	1,009	telephone	
(New York (state)) New York	Likely voters	Siena Research Institute	June 4–7, 2018	38%	56%	745	telephone	
United States	Registered voters	Fox News	April 22–24, 2018	43%	29%	1,014	telephone	
(New York (state)) New York	Registered voters	Siena Research Institute	April 8–12, 2018	31%	53%	692	telephone	
United States	Registered voters	Quinnipiac University	February 16–19, 2018	37%	26%	1,249	telephone	
(New York (state)) New York	Registered voters	Siena Research Institute	February 5–8, 2018	33%	52%	823	telephone	
United States	Registered voters	Fox News	January 21–23, 2018	45%	31%	1,002	telephone	
(New York (state)) New York	Registered voters	Siena Research Institute	January 7–11, 2018	32%	59%	824	telephone	
United States	Registered voters	Emerson College	October 12–14, 2017	44%	33%	820	telephone	
United States	Registered voters	Morning Consult (for Politico)	October 5–9, 2017	43%	24%	1,996	online	
(New York (state)) New York	Registered voters	Siena Research Institute	September 25 – October 2, 2017	28%	58%	789	telephone	
United States	All adults	CNN	September 17–20, 2017	41%	28%	1,053	telephone	
United States	All adults	NBC News/Wall Street Journal	September 14–18, 2017	39%	18%	900	telephone	
(New York (state)) New York	Registered voters	Siena Research Institute	August 26–30, 2017	29%	58%	771	telephone	
United States	Registered voters	Fox News	August 27–29, 2017	44%	27%	1,006	telephone	
United States	Registered voters	Fox News	June 25–27, 2017	47%	26%	1,017	telephone	
(New York (state)) New York	Registered voters	Siena Research Institute	May 15–21, 2017	30%	57%	770	telephone	
United States	Registered voters	Quinnipiac University	May 4–9, 2017	35%	25%	1,078	telephone	
United States	Registered voters	Quinnipiac University	March 30 – April 3, 2017	36%	25%	1,171	telephone	
(New York (state)) New York	Registered voters	Siena Research Institute	March 19–23, 2017	33%	60%	791	telephone	
United States	All adults	YouGov (for The Economist)	February 25 – March 1, 2017	40%	26%	1,500	online	
United States	All adults	YouGov (for The Economist)	January 23–25, 2017	45%	26%	2,692	online	

Trump more favorable Schumer more favorable

=== vs. Mike Pence ===
Area polled	Segment polled	Polling group	Date	Donald Trump favorable	Mike Pence favorable	Sample size	Polling method	Source
United States	All adults	Gallup	October 16–27, 2020	45%	43%	1,018	telephone	
United States	Registered voters	NBC News/Wall Street Journal	October 9–12, 2020	42%	39%	1,000	telephone	
United States	Registered voters	Fox News	October 3–6, 2020	44%	47%	1,107	telephone	
United States	All adults	CNN	October 1–4, 2020	39%	38%	1,205	telephone	
United States	Registered voters	NBC News/Wall Street Journal	September 30 – October 1, 2020	39%	36%	800	telephone	
United States	Likely voters	Siena College/New York Times	September 22–24, 2020	44%	44%	950	telephone	
United States	Registered voters	NBC News/Wall Street Journal	September 13–16, 2020	41%	38%	1,000	telephone	
United States	All adults	Gallup	August 31 – September 13, 2020	41%	41%	1,019	telephone	
United States	Likely voters	Fox News	September 7–10, 2020	46%	48%	1,191	telephone	
United States	Registered voters	Monmouth University	September 3–8, 2020	40%	38%	758	telephone	
Florida	All adults	NBC News/Marist	August 31 – September 6, 2020	45%	43%	1,146	telephone	
United States	All adults	CNN	August 28 – September 1, 2020	40%	41%	1,106	telephone	
United States	Likely voters	Quinnipiac University	August 28–31, 2020	41%	38%	1,081	telephone	
United States	Registered voters	Suffolk University/USA Today	August 28–31, 2020	43%	41%	1,000	telephone	
United States	All adults	ABC News/Washington Post	August 12–15, 2020	42%	44%	1,001	telephone	
United States	All adults	CNN	August 12–15, 2020	43%	41%	1,108	telephone	
United States	Registered voters	Fox News	August 9–12, 2020	43%	41%	1,000	telephone	
United States	Likely voters	Georgetown Institute of Politics and Public Service	August 1–6, 2020	40%	41%	1,000	telephone	
Iowa	All adults	The Des Moines Register/Mediacom	June 7–10, 2020	45%	44%	801	telephone	
United States	Registered voters	Fox News	May 17–20, 2020	43%	42%	1,207	telephone	
United States	Registered voters	Suffolk University/USA Today	April 21–25, 2020	39%	40%	1,000	telephone	
United States	All adults	CNN	March 4–7, 2020	43%	37%	1,211	telephone	
United States	All adults	Gallup	February 17–28, 2020	46%	41%	1,020	telephone	
United States	All adults	Associated Press/NORC at the University of Chicago	February 13–16, 2020	43%	41%	1,074	telephone and online	
United States	Registered voters	Suffolk University/USA Today	December 10–14, 2019	44%	42%	1,000	telephone	
United States	All adults	Gallup	October 14–31, 2019	41%	39%	1,506	telephone	
United States	Registered voters	Suffolk University/USA Today	October 23–26, 2019	44%	40%	1,000	telephone	
United States	All adults	Grinnell College	October 17–23, 2019	42%	44%	1,003	telephone	
United States	All adults	CNN	October 17–20, 2019	42%	38%	1,003	telephone	
United States	Registered voters	Fox News	October 6–8, 2019	43%	40%	1,003	telephone	
United States	Registered voters	Fox News	August 11–13, 2019	42%	39%	1,013	telephone	
United States	Registered voters	Suffolk University/USA Today	March 13–17, 2019	42%	41%	1,000	telephone	
United States	All adults	Gallup	February 12–28, 2019	44%	42%	1,932	telephone	
United States	Registered voters	Fox News	February 10–12, 2019	43%	42%	1,004	telephone	
United States	All adults	CNN	January 30 – February 2, 2019	42%	39%	1,011	telephone	
United States	Registered voters	Suffolk University/USA Today	December 11–16, 2018	40%	39%	1,000	telephone	
United States	All adults	Gallup	September 4–12, 2018	41%	43%	1,035	telephone	
United States	Registered voters	Suffolk University/USA Today	August 23–28, 2018	40%	36%	1,000	telephone	
United States	Registered voters	Suffolk University/USA Today	June 13–18, 2018	40%	42%	1,000	telephone	
New Hampshire	Likely voters	Suffolk University	April 26–30, 2018	42%	43%	800	telephone	
United States	All adults	YouGov (for The Economist)	April 22–24, 2018	39%	39%	1,500	online	
United States	Registered voters	Suffolk University/USA Today	February 20–24, 2018	34%	36%	1,000	telephone	
United States	Registered voters	Quinnipiac University	February 16–19, 2018	37%	36%	1,249	telephone	
United States	All adults	CNN	January 14–18, 2018	40%	40%	1,005	telephone	
United States	All adults	NBC News/Wall Street Journal	January 13–17, 2018	36%	33%	900	telephone	
United States	Registered voters	Suffolk University/USA Today	December 5–9, 2017	34%	33%	1,000	telephone	
United States	All adults	CNN	November 2–5, 2017	38%	38%	1,021	telephone	
United States	Registered voters	Morning Consult (for Politico)	October 5–9, 2017	43%	44%	1,996	online	
United States	Registered voters	Suffolk University/USA Today	September 27 – October 1, 2017	34%	36%	1,000	telephone	
United States	Registered voters	Fox News	August 27–29, 2017	44%	46%	1,006	telephone	
United States	Registered voters	GW Battleground	August 13–17, 2017	42%	43%	1,000	telephone	
United States	All adults	Bloomberg News	July 8–12, 2017	41%	44%	1,001	telephone	
United States	Registered voters	Fox News	June 25–27, 2017	47%	47%	1,017	telephone	
United States	Registered voters	Suffolk University/USA Today	June 24–27, 2017	40%	41%	1,000	telephone	
United States	All adults	CNN/ORC	April 22–25, 2017	45%	46%	1,009	telephone	
United States	All adults	NBC News/Wall Street Journal	April 17–20, 2017	39%	38%	900	telephone	
United States	Registered voters	Fox News	March 12–14, 2017	44%	47%	1,008	telephone	
United States	All adults	Pew Research Center	February 28 – March 12, 2017	43%	45%	3,844	telephone and online	
United States	Registered voters	Quinnipiac University	March 2–6, 2017	43%	40%	1,283	telephone	
United States	Registered voters	Suffolk University/USA Today	March 1–5, 2017	45%	47%	1,000	telephone	
United States	All adults	CNN/ORC	March 1–4, 2017	45%	47%	1,025	telephone	
United States	All adults	YouGov (for The Economist)	February 25 – March 1, 2017	40%	42%	1,500	online	
United States	All adults	NBC News/Wall Street Journal	February 18–22, 2017	43%	42%	1,000	telephone	
United States	All adults	McClatchy/Marist College	February 15–19, 2017	38%	43%	1,073	telephone	
United States	All adults	YouGov (for The Economist)	January 23–25, 2017	45%	44%	2,692	online	

Trump more favorable Pence more favorable

=== vs. Nancy Pelosi ===
Area polled	Segment polled	Polling group	Date	Donald Trump favorable	Nancy Pelosi favorable	Sample size	Polling method	Source(s)
United States	Registered voters	Suffolk University/USA Today	August 28–31, 2020	43%	35%	1,000	telephone	
United States	Registered voters	Suffolk University/USA Today	April 21–25, 2020	39%	35%	1,000	telephone	
United States	All adults	Gallup	February 17–28, 2020	46%	39%	1,020	telephone	
United States	Registered voters	NBC News/Wall Street Journal	January 26–29, 2020	43%	33%	1,000	telephone	
United States	Registered voters	Fox News	January 19–22, 2020	45%	43%	1,005	telephone	
United States	All adults	CNN	December 12–15, 2019	43%	39%	1,005	telephone	
United States	Registered voters	Suffolk University/USA Today	December 10–14, 2019	44%	36%	1,000	telephone	
United States	All adults	Gallup	October 14–31, 2019	41%	40%	1,506	telephone	
United States	All adults	NBC News/Wall Street Journal	October 27–30, 2019	40%	31%	900	telephone	
United States	All adults	Grinnell College	October 17–23, 2019	42%	38%	1,003	telephone	
United States	All adults	CNN	October 17–20, 2019	42%	44%	1,003	telephone	
United States	Likely voters	Georgetown Institute of Politics and Public Service	October 6–10, 2019	42%	41%	1,000	telephone	
United States	Registered voters	Fox News	October 6–8, 2019	43%	42%	1,003	telephone	
(New York (state)) New York	Registered voters	Siena College Research Institute	September 8–12, 2019	32%	47%	798	telephone	
United States	Registered voters	Suffolk University/USA Today	August 20–25, 2019	41%	31%	1,000	telephone	
United States	Registered voters	Fox News	July 21–23, 2019	45%	39%	1,004	telephone	
United States	Registered voters	Suffolk University/USA Today	June 11–15, 2019	46%	32%	1,000	telephone	
(New York (state)) New York	Registered voters	Siena College Research Institute	June 2–6, 2019	34%	47%	812	telephone	
United States	All adults	CNN	May 28–31, 2019	45%	40%	1,006	telephone	
United States	Likely voters	Georgetown Institute of Politics and Public Service	March 31 – April 4, 2019	40%	37%	1,000	telephone	
United States	Registered voters	Suffolk University/USA Today	March 13–17, 2019	42%	36%	1,000	telephone	
United States	Registered voters	Fox News	February 10–12, 2019	43%	36%	1,004	telephone	
United States	All adults	CNN	January 30 – February 2, 2019	42%	42%	1,011	telephone	
United States	All adults	Gallup	January 21–27, 2019	39%	38%	1,022	telephone	
United States	All adults	NBC News/Wall Street Journal	January 20–23, 2019	39%	28%	900	telephone	
United States	Registered voters	Quinnipiac University	January 9–13, 2019	41%	35%	1,209	telephone	
United States	All adults	NBC News/Wall Street Journal	December 9–12, 2018	37%	28%	900	telephone	
United States	All adults	Gallup	December 3–12, 2018	40%	38%	1,025	telephone	
United States	Registered voters	Fox News	December 9–11, 2018	46%	36%	1,006	telephone	
United States	Registered voters	NBC News/Wall Street Journal	October 14–17, 2018	42%	22%	900	telephone	
United States	Registered voters	NBC News/Wall Street Journal	August 18–22, 2018	40%	20%	900	telephone	
United States	Registered voters	Fox News	August 19–21, 2018	41%	29%	1,009	telephone	
Michigan	Likely voters	EPIC-MRA	April 28–30, 2018	40%	25%	600	telephone	
United States	Registered voters	Fox News	April 22–24, 2018	43%	31%	1,014	telephone	
United States	All adults	ABC News/Washington Post	April 8–11, 2018	32%	32%	1,002	telephone	
United States	All adults	NBC News/Wall Street Journal	March 10–14, 2018	37%	21%	1,100	telephone	
United States	Registered voters	Quinnipiac University	February 16–19, 2018	37%	29%	1,249	telephone	
United States	Registered voters	Fox News	January 21–23, 2018	45%	31%	1,002	telephone	
United States	Registered voters	Morning Consult (for Politico)	October 5–9, 2017	43%	29%	1,996	online	
United States	All adults	CNN	September 17–20, 2017	41%	29%	1,053	telephone	
United States	All adults	NBC News/Wall Street Journal	September 14–18, 2017	39%	25%	900	telephone	
United States	Registered voters	Fox News	August 27–29, 2017	44%	31%	1,006	telephone	
United States	Registered voters	Quinnipiac University	May 4–9, 2017	35%	31%	1,078	telephone	
United States	Registered voters	Quinnipiac University	March 30 – April 3, 2017	36%	30%	1,171	telephone	
United States	Registered voters	Fox News	March 12–14, 2017	44%	33%	1,008	telephone	
United States	All adults	NBC News/Wall Street Journal	February 18–22, 2017	43%	19%	500	telephone	
United States	Registered voters	Morning Consult (for Politico)	February 16–19, 2017	47%	29%	2,013	online	
United States	All adults	YouGov (for The Economist)	January 23–25, 2017	45%	27%	2,692	online	

Trump more favorable Pelosi more favorable

=== vs. Paul Ryan ===
Area polled	Segment polled	Polling group	Date	Donald Trump favorable	Paul Ryan favorable	Sample size	Polling method	Source(s)
United States	All adults	Gallup	December 3–12, 2018	40%	34%	1,025	telephone	
Wisconsin	Likely voters	Marquette University Law School	September 12–16, 2018	40%	42%	614	telephone	
Wisconsin	Registered voters	Marquette University Law School	June 13–17, 2018	44%	43%	800	telephone	
United States	Registered voters	Fox News	April 22–24, 2018	43%	36%	1,014	telephone	
United States	All adults	NBC News/Wall Street Journal	March 10–14, 2018	37%	24%	1,100	telephone	
Wisconsin	Registered voters	Marquette University Law School	February 25 – March 1, 2018	44%	46%	800	telephone	
United States	Registered voters	Quinnipiac University	February 16–19, 2018	37%	28%	1,249	telephone	
United States	Registered voters	Fox News	January 21–23, 2018	45%	40%	1,002	telephone	
United States	All adults	NBC News/Wall Street Journal	January 13–17, 2018	36%	28%	900	telephone	
United States	All adults	CNN	December 14–17, 2017	36%	35%	1,001	telephone	
United States	Registered voters	Morning Consult (for Politico)	October 5–9, 2017	43%	32%	1,996	online	
United States	All adults	CNN	September 17–20, 2017	41%	32%	1,053	telephone	
United States	All adults	NBC News/Wall Street Journal	September 14–18, 2017	39%	24%	900	telephone	
United States	Registered voters	Fox News	August 27–29, 2017	44%	35%	1,006	telephone	
United States	All adults	Bloomberg News	July 8–12, 2017	41%	34%	1,001	telephone	
United States	Registered voters	Quinnipiac University	May 4–9, 2017	35%	24%	1,078	telephone	
United States	All adults	NBC News/Wall Street Journal	April 17–20, 2017	39%	22%	900	telephone	
United States	Registered voters	Quinnipiac University	March 30 – April 3, 2017	36%	28%	1,171	telephone	
United States	Registered voters	Quinnipiac University	March 16–21, 2017	36%	27%	1,056	telephone	
United States	Registered voters	Fox News	March 12–14, 2017	44%	37%	1,008	telephone	
United States	All adults	NBC News/Wall Street Journal	February 18–22, 2017	43%	34%	500	telephone	
United States	Registered voters	Morning Consult (for Politico)	February 16–19, 2017	47%	38%	2,013	online	
United States	All adults	YouGov (for The Economist)	January 23–25, 2017	45%	34%	2,692	online	

Trump more favorable Ryan more favorable

=== vs. Vladimir Putin ===
Area polled	Segment polled	Polling group	Date	Donald Trump favorable	Vladimir Putin favorable	Sample size	Polling method	Source(s)
United States	Registered voters	Fox News	April 14–16, 2019	44%	9%	1,005	telephone	
United States	Registered voters	NBC News/Wall Street Journal	July 15–18, 2018	40%	5%	450	telephone	
United States	All adults	CNN	June 14–17, 2018	40%	11%	1,012	telephone	
United States	Registered voters	Public Policy Polling	October 27–29, 2017	38%	7%	572	telephone and online	
United States	Registered voters	Emerson College	October 12–14, 2017	44%	11%	820	telephone	
United States	Registered voters	Public Policy Polling	September 22–25, 2017	41%	11%	865	telephone and online	
United States	All adults	Public Religion Research Institute	August 2–8, 2017	38%	15%	2,024	telephone	
United States	All adults	Bloomberg News	July 8–12, 2017	41%	15%	1,001	telephone	
United States	Registered voters	Public Policy Polling	May 12–14, 2017	40%	8%	692	telephone and online	
United States	Registered voters	Public Policy Polling	March 27–28, 2017	41%	9%	677	telephone and online	
United States	All adults	Pew Research Center	February 28 – March 12, 2017	43%	16%	3,844	telephone and online	
United States	Registered voters	Public Policy Polling	January 23–24, 2017	44%	10%	1,043	telephone and online	

Trump more favorable Putin more favorable to

== Issue-specific support ==
=== Appointment of Neil Gorsuch to Supreme Court ===
In February 2017, Donald Trump nominated Neil Gorsuch to the Supreme Court of the United States. Gorsuch was confirmed on April 7, 2017, by a 54–45 vote.

Area polled	Segment polled	Polling group	Date	Support	Oppose	Unsure	Sample size	Polling method	Source
United States	Registered voters	Quinnipiac University	April 12–18, 2017	49%	36%	15%	1,062	telephone	
United States	Registered voters	Quinnipiac University	March 30 – April 3, 2017	48%	35%	17%	1,171	telephone	
United States	Registered voters	Quinnipiac University	February 16–21, 2017	50%	31%	19%	1,323	telephone	
United States	Registered voters	Emerson College	February 5–6, 2017	52%	32%	16%	617	telephone	

majority support plurality support majority oppose plurality oppose

=== Ban on military service by transgender people ===
Donald Trump signed a presidential memorandum banning transgender individuals from serving openly in the U.S. military.

In the following table, the "support" column indicates the percentage of respondents who supported the ban, whereas the "oppose" column indicates the percentage of respondents who were opposed to the ban.

Area polled	Segment polled	Polling group	Date	Support	Oppose	Unsure	Sample size	Polling method	Source
United States	All adults	Gallup	May 15–30, 2019	26%	71%	2%	1,017	telephone	
United States	All adults	Public Religion Research Institute	April 9–20, 2019	32%	63%	5%	1,100	telephone	
United States	Registered voters	Quinnipiac University	January 25–28, 2019	22%	70%	8%	1,004	telephone	
United States	All adults	CNN	December 14–17, 2017	22%	73%	5%	1,001	telephone	
United States	All adults	Public Religion Research Institute	August 2–8, 2017	30%	64%	6%	2,024	telephone	
United States	Registered voters	Quinnipiac University	July 27 – August 1, 2017	27%	68%	5%	1,125	telephone	

majority support plurality support majority oppose plurality oppose

=== Climate change regulations repeal ===
Donald Trump has pledged to repeal certain U.S. government regulations intended to address climate change.

Area polled	Segment polled	Polling group	Date	Support	Oppose	Unsure	Sample size	Polling method	Source
United States	Registered voters	Quinnipiac University	May 4–9, 2017	28%	65%	7%	1,078	telephone	
United States	Registered voters	Quinnipiac University	April 12–18, 2017	25%	66%	9%	1,062	telephone	
United States	All adults	CBS News	April 11–15, 2017	38%	51%	---	1,011	telephone	
United States	Registered voters	Quinnipiac University	March 30 – April 3, 2017	28%	62%	10%	1,171	telephone	
United States	Registered voters	Quinnipiac University	March 16–21, 2017	29%	63%	8%	1,056	telephone	
United States	Registered voters	Quinnipiac University	March 2–6, 2017	29%	62%	9%	1,323	telephone	
United States	Registered voters	Quinnipiac University	February 16–21, 2017	27%	63%	10%	1,323	telephone	
United States	All adults	Quinnipiac University	January 5–9, 2017	32%	59%	9%	899	telephone	

majority support plurality support majority oppose plurality oppose

=== Construction of border wall ===
In January 2017, Donald Trump ordered construction of a wall along portions of the Mexico–United States border.

Area polled	Segment polled	Polling group	Date	Support	Oppose	Unsure	Sample size	Polling method	Source
United States	All adults	Associated Press/NORC at the University of Chicago	July 16–20, 2020	35%	47%	1%	1,057	telephone	
Arizona	Registered voters	Monmouth University	March 11–14, 2020	45%	50%	5%	847	telephone	
California	All adults	Public Policy Institute of California	January 3–12, 2020	30%	68%	2%	1,694	telephone	
United States	Registered voters	Fox News	December 8–11, 2019	44%	52%	4%	1,000	telephone	
Wisconsin	Registered voters	Fox News	September 29 - October 2, 2019	42%	52%	7%	1,512	telephone	
United States	Registered voters	NBC News/Wall Street Journal	September 13–16, 2019	43%	56%	1%	900	telephone	
United States	Registered voters	Fox News	June 9–12, 2019	42%	55%	2%	1,001	telephone	
United States	Registered voters	Fox News	May 11–14, 2019	43%	51%	6%	1,008	telephone	
United States	All adults	Monmouth University	April 11–15, 2019	42%	56%	3%	801	telephone	
United States	Registered voters	Fox News	March 17–20, 2019	44%	51%	5%	1,002	telephone	
United States	All adults	Monmouth University	March 1–4, 2019	44%	51%	4%	802	telephone	
United States	Registered voters	Quinnipiac University	March 1–4, 2019	41%	55%	4%	1,120	telephone	
United States	Registered voters	Fox News	February 10–12, 2019	46%	50%	4%	1,004	telephone	
North Carolina	All adults	High Point University	February 4–11, 2019	44%	46%	11%	873	telephone and online	
California	Registered voters	Quinnipiac University	January 30 - February 4, 2019	32%	64%	4%	912	telephone	
United States	Registered voters	Quinnipiac University	January 25–28, 2019	41%	55%	4%	1,004	telephone	
United States	All adults	Monmouth University	January 25–27, 2019	44%	52%	4%	805	telephone	
United States	All adults	Gallup	January 21–27, 2019	40%	60%	1%	1,022	telephone	
United States	All adults	ABC News/Washington Post	January 21–24, 2019	42%	54%	4%	1,001	telephone	
United States	All adults	NBC News/Wall Street Journal	January 20–23, 2019	45%	52%	3%	900	telephone	
United States	Registered voters	Fox News	January 20–22, 2019	43%	51%	6%	1,008	telephone	
United States	All adults	Pew Research Center	January 9–14, 2019	40%	58%	2%	1,505	telephone	
United States	Registered voters	Quinnipiac University	January 9–13, 2019	43%	55%	2%	1,209	telephone	
United States	All adults	Investor's Business Daily	January 3–12, 2019	46%	53%	1%	903	telephone	
United States	All adults	CNN	January 10–11, 2019	39%	56%	5%	848	telephone	
United States	All adults	ABC News/Washington Post	January 8–11, 2019	42%	54%	4%	788	telephone	
United States	Registered voters	Quinnipiac University	December 12–17, 2018	43%	54%	3%	1,147	telephone	
United States	All adults	CNN	December 6–9, 2018	38%	57%	4%	1,015	telephone	
California	All adults	Public Policy Institute of California	October 12–21, 2018	24%	74%	2%	1,690	telephone	
United States	All adults	CBS News	October 14–17, 2018	37%	60%	3%	1,108	telephone	
United States	Registered voters	Fox News	September 16–19, 2018	39%	51%	10%	1,003	telephone	
United States	Registered voters	Quinnipiac University	August 9–13, 2018	38%	58%	4%	1,175	telephone	
United States	All adults	Washington Post/Schar School of Policy and Government	June 27 – July 2, 2018	42%	55%	3%	1,473	telephone and online	
United States	Registered voters	Quinnipiac University	June 14–17, 2018	39%	58%	4%	905	telephone	
Wisconsin	Likely voters	Marquette University Law School	June 13–17, 2018	40%	55%	4%	800	telephone	
United States	All adults	Gallup	June 1–13, 2018	41%	57%	2%	1,520	telephone	
United States	All adults	Pew Research Center	June 5–12, 2018	40%	56%	4%	2,002	telephone	
United States	All adults	CBS News	May 3–6, 2018	38%	59%	3%	1,101	telephone	
United States	All adults	Investor's Business Daily	April 26 – May 4, 2018	40%	59%	1%	900	telephone	
Texas	Registered voters	Quinnipiac University	April 12–17, 2018	43%	53%	4%	1,029	telephone	
United States	Registered voters	Quinnipiac University	April 6–9, 2018	40%	57%	3%	1,181	telephone	
California	All adults	Public Policy Institute of California	March 4–13, 2018	25%	71%	3%	1,694	telephone	
United States	All adults	CBS News	March 8–11, 2018	38%	60%	2%	1,223	telephone	
Wisconsin	Registered voters	Marquette University Law School	February 25 – March 1, 2018	37%	59%	3%	800	telephone	
United States	Registered voters	Quinnipiac University	February 2–5, 2018	37%	59%	4%	1,333	telephone	
United States	All adults	Monmouth University	January 28–30, 2018	40%	57%	3%	806	telephone	
United States	Registered voters	Fox News	January 21–23, 2018	40%	53%	7%	1,002	telephone	
United States	All adults	ABC News/Washington Post	January 15–18, 2018	34%	63%	3%	1,005	telephone	
United States	All adults	CNN	January 14–18, 2018	35%	62%	3%	1,005	telephone	
United States	All adults	CBS News	January 13–16, 2018	35%	61%	4%	1,125	telephone	
United States	All adults	Pew Research Center	January 10–15, 2018	37%	60%	3%	1,503	telephone	
United States	Registered voters	Quinnipiac University	January 5–9, 2018	34%	63%	3%	1,106	telephone	
United States	Registered voters	Quinnipiac University	December 6–11, 2017	36%	62%	2%	1,211	telephone	
United States	All adults	CBS News	December 3–5, 2017	36%	61%	3%	1,120	telephone	
New Hampshire	All adults	University of New Hampshire	October 26 – November 9, 2017	34%	61%	2%	956	telephone	
United States	All adults	Public Religion Research Institute	October 18–30, 2017	36%	63%	2%	2,019	telephone	
United States	All adults	Associated Press/NORC	September 28 – October 2, 2017	32%	49%	---	1,150	telephone and online	
United States	Registered voters	Quinnipiac University	September 21–26, 2017	37%	60%	3%	1,412	telephone	
Virginia	Likely voters	Roanoke College	September 16–23, 2017	33%	61%	5%	596	telephone	
United States	All adults	ABC News/Washington Post	September 18–21, 2017	37%	62%	1%	1,002	telephone	
United States	All adults	CNN	September 17–20, 2017	33%	63%	3%	1,053	telephone	
United States	All adults	Monmouth University	September 15–19, 2017	35%	60%	5%	1,009	telephone	
California	All adults	Public Policy Institute of California	September 10–19, 2017	24%	73%	2%	1,726	telephone	
United States	All adults	YouGov (for The Economist)	September 3–5, 2017	38%	47%	16%	1,500	online	
United States	Registered voters	Fox News	August 27–29, 2017	39%	56%	5%	1,006	telephone	
United States	All adults	CBS News	August 3–6, 2017	36%	61%	3%	1,111	telephone	
United States	Likely voters	Rasmussen Reports	July 26–27, 2017	37%	56%	---	1,000	telephone and online	
United States	Registered voters	Fox News	May 21–23, 2017	32%	65%	3%	1,011	telephone	
United States	All adults	YouGov (for The Economist)	May 6–9, 2017	40%	46%	14%	1,500	online	
United States	Registered voters	Quinnipiac University	May 4–9, 2017	33%	64%	3%	1,078	telephone	
Mexico	All adults	Pew Research Center	March 2 – April 10, 2017	5%	94%	2%	1,000	face-to-face	
United States	Registered voters	Quinnipiac University	March 30 – April 3, 2017	33%	64%	3%	1,171	telephone	
United States	All adults	Gallup	March 9–29, 2017	36%	56%	7%	1,526	telephone	
United States	All adults	Pew Research Center	February 16 – March 15, 2017	35%	64%	1%	1,505	telephone	
California	All adults	Public Policy Institute of California	March 5–14, 2017	25%	72%	3%	1,690	telephone	
United States	All adults	Pew Research Center	February 28 – March 12, 2017	40%	59%	1%	3,844	telephone and online	
United States	All adults	SurveyMonkey	March 1–5, 2017	44%	54%	3%	4,551	online	
United States	All adults	CBS News	February 17–21, 2017	39%	58%	3%	1,280	telephone	
United States	Registered voters	Quinnipiac University	February 16–21, 2017	37%	60%	3%	1,323	telephone	
United States	All adults	SurveyMonkey (for NBC News)	February 13–19, 2017	41%	56%	2%	11,512	online	
United States	All adults	Pew Research Center	February 7–12, 2017	35%	62%	3%	1,503	telephone	
United States	Registered voters	Morning Consult/Politico	February 2–4, 2017	48%	42%	10%	2,070	online interviews	
San Diego	N/A	SurveyUSA (for San Diego Union-Tribune)	January 25, 2017	43%	48%	8%	500	N/A	
United States	Registered voters	Morning Consult (for Politico)	January 20–22, 2017	47%	45%	7%	1,992	telephone	

majority support plurality support majority oppose plurality oppose

=== Construction of Keystone Pipeline ===
In January 2017, Donald Trump ordered the U.S. Army Corps of Engineers to permit construction of the proposed Keystone XL oil pipeline. Donald Trump wanted to build the final uncompleted portion of the Dakota Access pipeline. The Keystone XL oil pipeline would bring oil from Alberta, Canada to the Nebraska area. It would then connect to an existing pipeline to bring the crude to the Illinois area.

Area polled	Segment polled	Polling group	Date	Support	Oppose	Unsure	Sample size	Polling method	Source
Canada	All adults	Angus Reid Institute	February 16–22, 2017	48%	33%	19%	1,515	online	
United States	All adults	Pew Research Center	February 7–12, 2017	42%	48%	10%	1,503	telephone	
United States	Registered voters	Morning Consult/Politico	February 2–4, 2017	48%	37%	15%	2,070	online interviews	

majority support plurality support majority oppose plurality oppose

=== Deportation of illegal immigrants with criminal records ===
In an interview following his election, Donald Trump said illegal immigrants with criminal records should be deported.

Area polled	Segment polled	Polling group	Date	Support	Oppose	Unsure	Sample size	Polling method	Source
United States	Registered voters	Morning Consult (for Politico)	January 20–22, 2017	72%	20%	8%	1,992	online	

majority support plurality support majority oppose plurality oppose

=== Government employee staffing cuts ===
Donald Trump has proposed a 20-percent cut in parts of the U.S. Government workforce.

Area polled	Segment polled	Polling group	Date	Support	Oppose	Unsure	Sample size	Polling method	Source
United States	Likely voters	Rasmussen Reports	January 17–18, 2017	54%	27%	19%	1,500	telephone and online	

majority support plurality support majority oppose plurality oppose

=== Obamacare repeal ===
Donald Trump has called for the repeal of the Affordable Care Act ("Obamacare").

Area polled	Segment polled	Polling group	Date	Support	Oppose	Unsure	Sample size	Polling method	Source(s)
United States	Registered voters	Fox News	October 3–6, 2020	32%	64%	4%	1,107	telephone	
Wisconsin	Registered voters	Marquette University Law School	August 4–9, 2020	40%	54%	6%	801	telephone	
United States	Registered voters	NBC News/Wall Street Journal	September 13–16, 2019	43%	52%	5%	900	telephone	
United States	Registered voters	Quinnipiac University	June 14–17, 2018	44%	51%	5%	905	telephone	
Ohio	Registered voters	Quinnipiac University	June 7–12, 2018	44%	51%	4%	1,082	telephone	
Texas	Registered voters	Quinnipiac University	April 12–17, 2018	45%	49%	5%	1,029	telephone	
United States	Registered voters	Quinnipiac University	September 21–26, 2017	45%	51%	5%	1,412	telephone	
United States	Registered voters	Quinnipiac University	August 9–15, 2017	45%	52%	3%	1,361	telephone	
United States	All adults	CNN	August 3–6, 2017	33%	64%	3%	1,018	telephone	
United States	Registered voters	Quinnipiac University	July 27 – August 1, 2017	42%	54%	4%	1,125	telephone	
United States	All adults	Associated Press/NORC	July 13–17, 2017	46%	53%	---	1,019	telephone and online	
United States	Registered voters	Quinnipiac University	June 22–27, 2017	45%	51%	4%	1,212	telephone	
United States	Registered voters	Quinnipiac University	May 31 – June 6, 2017	44%	53%	4%	1,361	telephone	
United States	Registered voters	Quinnipiac University	May 17–23, 2017	45%	50%	4%	1,404	telephone	
United States	Registered voters	Quinnipiac University	May 4–9, 2017	44%	53%	3%	1,078	telephone	
United States	Registered voters	Quinnipiac University	April 12–18, 2017	44%	53%	2%	1,062	telephone	
United States	Registered voters	Quinnipiac University	March 30 – April 3, 2017	42%	54%	4%	1,171	telephone	
United States	Registered voters	Quinnipiac University	March 16–21, 2017	45%	51%	5%	1,056	telephone	
United States	All adults	Kaiser Family Foundation	March 6–12, 2017	45%	51%	3%	1,206	telephone	
United States	Registered voters	Quinnipiac University	March 2–6, 2017	45%	51%	4%	1,323	telephone	
United States	Registered voters	Public Policy Polling	February 21–22, 2017	43%	51%	6%	941	telephone and online	
United States	Registered voters	Quinnipiac University	February 16–21, 2017	43%	54%	3%	1,323	telephone	
United States	All adults	Investor's Business Daily	January 27 – February 2, 2017	42%	54%	4%	885	telephone	
United States	All adults	Quinnipiac University	January 5–9, 2017	48%	47%	5%	899	telephone	

majority support plurality support majority oppose plurality oppose

=== Refugee restrictions ===
During his presidential campaign, Donald Trump called for the suspension of immigration to the United States from seven "terror prone" countries. In January 2017, he signed an executive order partially implementing that policy and halving annual U.S. refugee intake from 100,000 to 50,000.

Area polled	Segment polled	Polling group	Date	Support	Oppose	Unsure	Sample size	Polling method	Source
United States	All adults	YouGov (for HuffPost)	May 25–26, 2017	45%	43%	13%	1,000	online	
United States	All adults	Gallup	March 9–29, 2017	40%	46%	14%	1,526	telephone	
United States	Registered voters	Quinnipiac University	March 16–21, 2017	42%	52%	6%	1,056	telephone	
California	All adults	Public Policy Institute of California	March 6–14, 2017	37%	58%	5%	1,487	telephone	
United States	All adults	Pew Research Center	February 28 – March 12, 2017	47%	52%	1%	3,844	telephone and online	
United States	Registered voters	Quinnipiac University	March 2–6, 2017	42%	51%	7%	1,323	telephone	
United States	Registered voters	Morning Consult/Politico	February 2–4, 2017	55%	38%	7%	2,070	online interviews	
United States	All adults	CBS News	February 1–2, 2017	45%	51%	4%	1,019	telephone	
United States	All adults	Investor's Business Daily	January 27 – February 2, 2017	51%	48%	1%	885	telephone	
United States	Registered voters	Ipsos (for Reuters)	January 30–31, 2017	49%	41%	10%	1,201	online	
United States	Likely voters	Rasmussen Reports	January 25–26, 2017	57%	32%	11%	1,000	telephone and online	
Utah	Registered voters	University of Utah	January 9–16, 2017	40%	55%	5%	605	N/A	
United States	All adults	Quinnipiac University	January 5–9, 2017	48%	42%	10%	899	telephone	

majority support plurality support majority oppose plurality oppose

=== Sanctuary city funding ===
In January 2017, Donald Trump issued an executive order that would block federal funding to "sanctuary cities".

Area polled	Segment polled	Polling group	Date	Support	Oppose	Unsure	Sample size	Polling method	Source
United States	Registered voters	Morning Consult/Politico	February 2–4, 2017	55%	33%	12%	2,070	online	

majority support plurality support majority oppose plurality oppose

=== UN funding ===
Donald Trump has said he plans to dramatically reduce United States funding to the United Nations and UN programs.

Area polled	Segment polled	Polling group	Date	Support	Oppose	Unsure	Sample size	Polling method	Source
United States	Likely voters	Rasmussen Reports	January 29–30, 2017	50%	33%	17%	1,000	telephone and online	

majority support plurality support majority oppose plurality oppose

=== Withdrawal from the Paris Agreement on climate change ===
On June 1, 2017, Donald Trump announced that the United States would withdraw from the Paris Agreement on climate change.

Area polled	Segment polled	Polling group	Date	Support	Oppose	Unsure	Sample size	Polling method	Source
United States	All adults	NPR/PBS NewsHour/Marist College	June 21–25, 2017	30%	53%	16%	1,205	telephone	
United States	All adults	Associated Press/NORC	June 8–11, 2017	29%	46%	1%	1,068	telephone and online	
United States	All adults	YouGov (for The Economist)	June 4–6, 2017	32%	50%	18%	1,500	online	
United States	Registered voters	Quinnipiac University	June 1–6, 2017	32%	62%	6%	1,361	telephone	
United States	All adults	ABC News/Washington Post	June 2–4, 2017	28%	59%	13%	527	telephone	
United States	All adults	Princeton Survey Research Associates International	June 1–4, 2017	34%	54%	8%	1,003	telephone	

majority support plurality support majority oppose plurality oppose

=== Withdrawal from Trans-Pacific Partnership ===
In January 2017, Donald Trump withdrew the United States from the Trans-Pacific Partnership trade pact.

Area polled	Segment polled	Polling group	Date	Support	Oppose	Unsure	Sample size	Polling method	Source
United States	Registered voters	Morning Consult/Politico	February 2–4, 2017	47%	33%	20%	2,070	online interviews	
United States	Likely voters	Rasmussen Reports	January 26, 2017	56%	27%	17%	1,500	telephone and online	

majority support plurality support majority oppose plurality oppose

== Global polls ==
A Gallup poll on 134 countries comparing the approval ratings of US leadership between the years 2016 and 2017 found that only in 29 of them did Trump lead Obama in job approval and that people living in authoritarian or hybrid regime states generally tended to rate Trump more favorably compared to people living in democratic states. Overall, more international respondents disapproved rather than approved of the Trump administration and approval ratings were reported to be similar to those in the last 2 years of the Bush administration. A Pew Research Center poll of 37 nations conducted in July 2017 found "a median of just 22% has confidence in Trump to do the right thing when it comes to international affairs". This compares to a median of 64% rate of confidence for his predecessor Barack Obama. Trump received a higher rating in only two countries: Russia and Israel. In a 2018 Pew Research poll of 25 nations, the confidence in Trump rose to 27%. In the 2019 poll, the confidence in Trump was at 29%. In the September 2020 poll, the confidence in Trump decreased to 16%.

== Post-Presidency retrospective polls ==
In a 2023 Gallup poll measuring approval of recent former presidents during their time in office, Trump had a retrospective approval rating of 46%, which was second lowest among presidents, measuring only above Richard Nixon. Trump had 12% among Democrats, 41% among Independents, and 91% among Republicans.

Trump had the lowest approval rating among all presidents surveyed with Democrats, the second lowest among Independents (ahead of only Richard Nixon), and the second highest among Republicans (behind only Ronald Reagan). Trump also had the biggest partisan gap of approval among all presidents listed with a 79% approval gap between Democrats and Republicans.

== See also ==
- Opinion polling on the second Trump presidency
- Donald Trump 2016 presidential campaign
- Donald Trump 2020 presidential campaign
- Nationwide opinion polling for the 2016 United States presidential election
- Statewide opinion polling for the 2016 United States presidential election
- Nationwide opinion polling for the 2020 United States presidential election
- Statewide opinion polling for the 2020 United States presidential election
- United States presidential approval rating
- List of heads of the executive by approval rating
