= Opinion polling on the second Trump presidency =

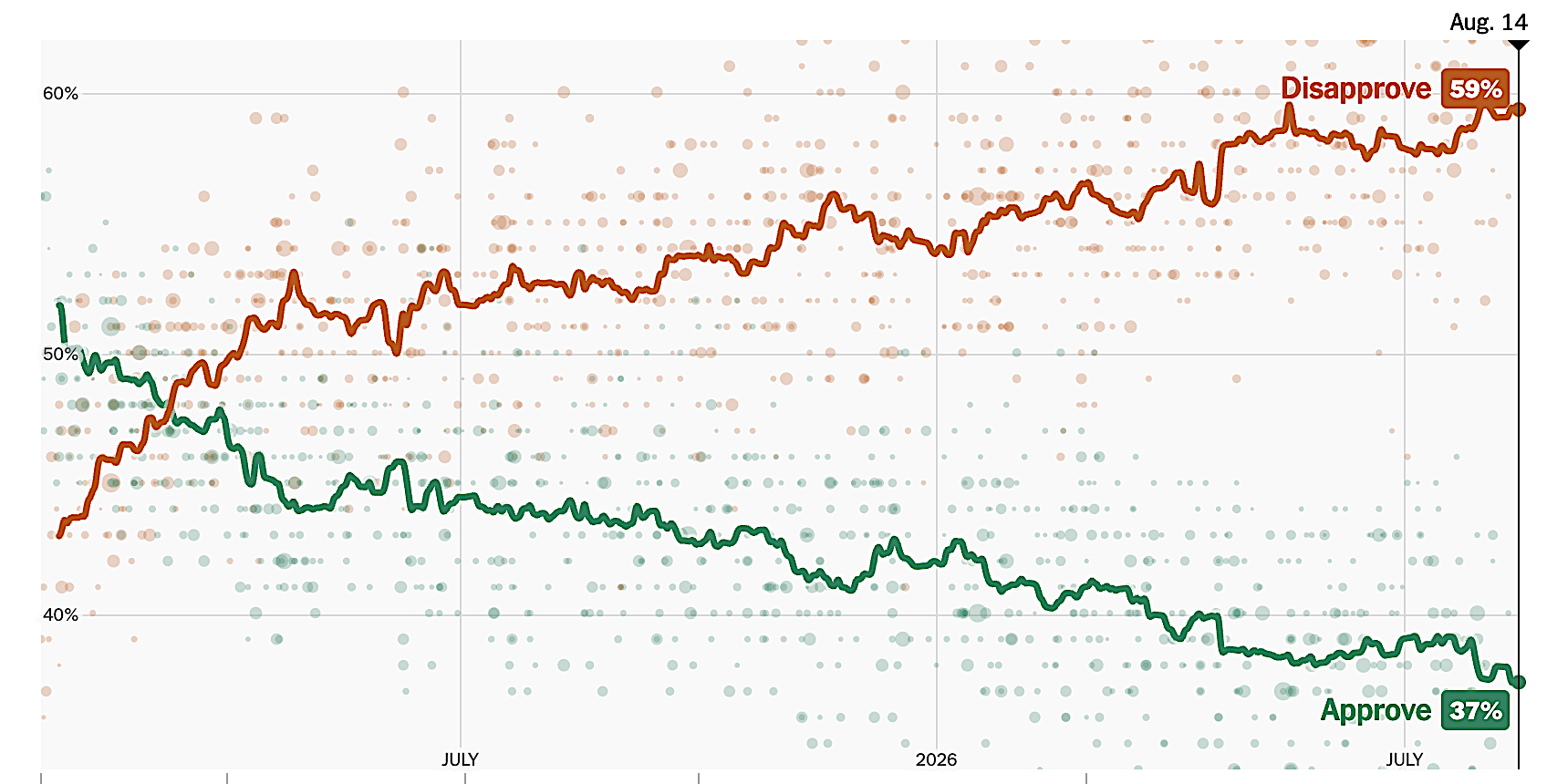
Trump's aggregated presidential approval ratings declined over the first year of his second term and remained consistently low overall.

In a larger context, Trump's approval rating (Gallup polling) after the first year of his second term was the lowest of any president since 1977.

This article summarizes the results of polls taken during the second presidency of Donald Trump which gather and analyze public opinion on his administration's performance and policies. At the time when Donald Trump began his second term, his approval rating was 47%, the second lowest approval rating at the start of a presidential term in polling history, second only to his own first term.

Throughout 2025 to 2026, Trump's approval rating has steadily declined to an average of 36 to 37%. In August 2026, Trump was the second most unpopular president at this stage of his presidency in the history of polling going back to the 1940s (the worst being Richard Nixon just days before resigning the office).

== Nationwide job approval ratings ==
Polls marked with a (R) or (D) have been identified by FiveThirtyEight (prior to its dissolution on March 5, 2025) as having Republican or Democratic funding, respectively.

Majority approval
Plurality approval
Tie
Plurality disapproval
Majority disapproval

=== Aggregate polls ===
==== Approval ====
Aggregator	Updated	Approve	Disapprove	Unsure/Other	Lead
Ballotpedia	November 19, 2026	39.0%	60.0%	1.0%	−21.0%
CNN	November 19, 2026	34.0%	65.0%	1.0%	−31.0%
Decision Desk HQ	November 19, 2026	36.6%	60.7%	2.7%	−24.1%
FiftyPlusOne	November 19, 2026	34.5%	62.0%	3.5%	−27.5%
NBC News	November 19, 2026	38.0%	60.0%	2.0%	−22.0%
Real Clear Politics	November 19, 2026	37.9%	59.8%	2.3%	−21.9%
Silver Bulletin	November 19, 2026	36.2%	60.4%	3.4%	−24.2%
The Economist	November 19, 2026	34.0%	62.0%	4.0%	−28.0%
The New York Times	November 19, 2026	36.0%	61.0%	3.0%	−25.0%
Average	November 19, 2026	36.3%	61.1%	2.5%	−24.8%

==== Favorability ====
Aggregator	Updated	Favorable	Unfavorable	Unsure/Other	Lead
Decision Desk HQ	November 19, 2026	35.9%	61.9%	2.2%	−26.0%
Real Clear Politics	November 19, 2026	37.8%	58.8%	3.4%	−21.0%

=== 2026 ===
==== November 2026 ====
July 2025
Poll source	Date	Sample size (Note: Key: A – all adults RV – registered voters LV – likely voters V – unclear)	MoE	Approve	Disapprove	Unsure/ Other	Net
Emerson College	November 14–16	1,000 RV	± 3.0%	37%	54%	9%	−17%
RMG Research/Napolitan Institute	November 9–16	2,000 RV	± 2.2%	39%	58%	3%	−29%
Reuters/Ipsos	November 13–16	1,199 RV	± 2.9%	34%	65%	1%	−31%
The Economist/YouGov	November 13–16	1,386 RV	± 3.0%	37%	62%	2%	−24%
Echelon Insights	November 12–16	1,027 LV	± 3.7%	36%	63%	1%	−27%
Morning Consult	November 13–15	2,200 RV	–	40%	58%	2%	−18%
The Rainey Center	November 8–12	1,001 LV	± 4.0%	39%	60%	1%	−21%
The Economist/YouGov	November 9–11	1,463 RV	± 3.0%	32%	63%	5%	−31%
Reuters/Ipsos	November 6–9	1,352 RV	± 2.7%	36%	63%	1%	−27%
Morning Consult	November 6–8	2,200 RV	–	40%	57%	3%	−17%
Global Strategy Group/GBAO/Navigator Research	October 28 – November 8	3,000 LV	± 1.8%	37%	63%	–	−26%
The Economist/YouGov	November 4–6	3,166 RV	± 2.2%	36%	62%	2%	−26%
Democracy Corps/YouGov Blue	October 29 – November 6	1,339 V	± 3.2%	39%	61%	–	−22%
J.L. Partners	November 3	870 LV	± 3.3%	40%	55%	5%	−15%
John Zogby Strategies	November 1–2	1,001 LV	± 3.2%	43%	55%	2%	−12%
Reuters/Ipsos	October 29 – November 2	1,357 RV	± 2.7%	36%	63%	1%	−27%
Financial Times/Focaldata	October 30 – November 1	2,090 LV	± 2.7%	35%	61%	4%	−26%

==== October 2026 ====
July 2025
Poll source	Date	Sample size	MoE	Approve	Disapprove	Unsure/ Other	Net
NBC News/Hart Research Associates & Public Opinion Strategies	October 28–30	1,000 RV	± 3.1%	40%	60%	–	−20%
YouGov	October 27–30	3,915 LV	± 1.7%	38%	60%	1%	−22%
Big Data Poll	October 27–30	3,214 LV	± 1.8%	40%	58%	1%	−18%
I&I/TIPP Insights	October 27–30	1,480 A	± 2.8%	41%	51%	8%	−10%
Tuft Public Opinion Lab/YouGov	October 23–27	1,000 A	± 3.6%	36%	61%	3%	−25%
Napolitan News Service/RMG Research	October 19–27	2,000 RV	± 2.2%	43%	55%	2%	−12%
Harvard/Harris	October 24–26	2,700 RV	± 1.9%	39%	59%	3%	−20%
Emerson College	October 24–26, 2026	1,000 (LV)	± 3.0%	37%	57%	6%	−20%
The Economist/YouGov	October 23–26	1,131 LV	—	41%	58%	1%	−17%
Reuters/Ipsos	October 22–26	1,679 A	± 2.4%	32%	66%	2%	−34%
The Argument/Verasight	October 21–23	1,549 RV	± 2.7%	45%	55%	–	−10%
Prolific	October 21–22	1,118 RV	—	36%	63%	1%	−27%
Targoz Market Research	October 20–22	1,118 LV	± ~3%	36%	63%	1%	−27%
Wall Street Journal/Impact Research and National Research Inc.	October 14–22	1,500 RV	± 2.5%	40%	59%	1%	−19%
Clarity Campaign Labs	October 15–21	1,016 LV	± 3.1%	42%	56%	2%	−14%
NPR/PBS/Marist College	October 19–20	1,289 RV	± 3.7%	38%	61%	1%	−23%
American Research Institute	October 16–20	1,100 A	± 3%	29%	67%	4%	−38%
Financial Times/Focaldata	October 16–20	1,845 A	± 2.8%	34%	59%	7%	−25%
Reuters/Ipsos	October 16–19	1,679 A	± 2%	31%	66%	3%	−35%
Strength in Numbers/Verasight	October 16–20	2,028 A	—	34%	62%	4%	−28%
The Rainey Center	October 14–20	1,279 RV	± 3.6%	42%	58%	1%	−16%
Morning Consult/Deseret News and Hinckley Institute of Politics	October 13–20	2,050 RV	± 2.0%	41%	56%	3%	−15%
CNN/SSRS	October 15–18	1,701 A	± 2.9%	32%	67%	1%	−35%
New York Times/Siena College	October 12–19	3,494 RV	± 1.9%	34%	60%	6%	−26%
Washington Post/ABC News/Ipsos	October 9–13	2,545 A	± 2%	33%	66%	1%	−33%
Fox News/Beacon Research and Shaw & Company Research	October 9–12	1,202 RV	± 2.5%	36%	64%	—	−28%
AP NORC	October 8–12	1,119 A	± 3.9%	36%	64%	—	−28%
Financial Times/Focaldata	October 2–4	2,275 RV	± 2.5%	34%	59%	7%	−25%
Navigator Research	September 30–October 5	1,000 RV	± 3.1%	36%	62%	2%	−26%
Reuters/Ipsos	September 30–October 5	4,506 A	± ~2%	32%	65%	3%	−33%
NBC News/Survey Monkey	September 28–October 12	19,135 A	± 2.6%	34%	66%	—	−32%
Pew Research Center	September 28–October 4	5,062 A	—	30%	68%	2%	−38%
Centerline Research & Strategy	September 26–October 1	1,239 RV	± 3.2%	35%	64%	1%	−29%

==== September 2026 ====
July 2025
Poll source	Date	Sample size	MoE	Approve	Disapprove	Unsure/ Other	Net
AP/NORC	September 24–28	2,140 A	± 2.9%	31%	69%	—	–38%
Quinnipiac University	September 24–27	1,032 RV	± 3.8%	34%	61%	5%	−27%
Napolitan News/RMG Research	September 21–29	2,000 RV	± 2.2%	41%	58%	1%	−17%
Emerson College	September 21–22	1,000 LV	± 3%	39%	57.9%	3.1%	−18.9%
The Economist/YouGov	September 18–21	1,401 RV	± 3.4%	35%	62%	3%	−27%
Echelon Insights	September 17–20	1,002 LV	± 3.6%	36%	64%	—	−28%
Reuters/Ipsos	September 17–20	1,277 A	± 2.8%	32%	66%	2%	−34%
Strength in Numbers/Verasight	September 16–21	1,528 A	± 2.6%	33%	63%	4%	−30%
American Research Group	September 16–20	1,100 A	± 3%	29%	68%	3%	−39%
CNN/SSRS	September 16–17	1,206 A	± 3.5%	33%	67%	—	−34%
Quantus Insights	September 15–18	1,389 LV	± 2.9%	39.6%	59.1%	1.3%	−19.5%
NBC News/Hart Research Associates & Public Opinion Strategies	September 11–15	1,000 RV	± 3.1%	41%	56%	3%	−15%

==== July 2026 ====
July 2025
Poll source	Date	Sample size	MoE	Approve	Disapprove	Unsure/ Other	Net
The Economist/YouGov	July 25–27	1,407 RV	± 3.2%	34%	62%	4%	−28%
CNN/SSRS	July 23–27	1,225 A	± 3.2%	34%	66%	—	−32%

==== June 2026 ====
July 2025
Poll source	Date	Sample size	MoE	Approve	Disapprove	Unsure/ Other	Net
The Economist/YouGov	May 29 – June 1	1,453 RV	± 3.2%	35%	61%	3%	−26%

==== May 2026 ====
July 2025
Poll source	Date	Sample size	MoE	Approve	Disapprove	Unsure/ Other	Net
The Economist/YouGov	May 1–4	1,409 RV	± 3.3%	36%	58%	3%	−22%

==== February 2026 ====
July 2025
Poll source	Date	Sample size	MoE	Approve	Disapprove	Unsure/ Other	Net
The Economist/YouGov	February 20–23	1,402 RV	± 3.1%	39%	57%	4%	−18%

A May 2026 map with February 2026 information displaying the approval ratings of Donald Trump by state

=== 2025 ===
==== July 2025 ====
July 2025
Poll source	Date	Sample size	MoE	Approve	Disapprove	Unsure/ Other	Net
The Economist/YouGov	July 4–7	1,389 RV	± 3.8%	43%	54%	3%	−11%

==== June 2025 ====
June 2025
Poll source	Date	Sample size	MoE	Approve	Disapprove	Unsure/ Other	Net
The Economist/YouGov	June 27–30	1,491 RV	± 3.0%	45%	53%	2%	−8%
The Economist/YouGov	June 20–23	1,455 RV	± 3.1%	43%	54%	3%	−11%
The Economist/YouGov	June 13–16	1,351 RV	± 3.1%	44%	53%	3%	−9%
The Economist/YouGov	June 6–9	1,397 RV	± 3.2%	45%	53%	2%	−8%
The Economist/YouGov	May 30–Jun 2	1,436 RV	± 3.2%	46%	51%	2%	−5%

==== May 2025 ====
February 2025
Poll source	Date	Sample size	MoE	Approve	Disapprove	Unsure/ Other	Net
The Economist/YouGov	May 16-19	1,710 A	± 3.2%	43%	51%	5%	−8%
YouGov	May 14-16	1,118 A	± 4%	44%	48%	8%	−4%
The Economist/YouGov	May 9-12	1,786 A	± 3.3%	43%	52%	5%	−9%
YouGov	May 6-8	1,143 A	± 3.7%	42%	50%	8%	−8%
The Economist/YouGov	May 2–5	1,850 A	± 3.2%	42%	52%	5%	−10%
The Economist/YouGov	May 2–5	1,693 RV	± 3.2%	44%	52%	3%	−8%
I&I/TIPP Insights	Apr 30 – May 2	1,400 A	± 3.7%	42%	47%	11%	−5%
InsiderAdvantage/Trafalgar	Apr 30 – May 1	1,200 RV	± 2.8%	46%	44%	10%	+2%

==== April 2025 ====
Civiqs poll results as of April 30, 2025 by state: Net disapproval 1–4% 5–9% 10–14% ≥15% / Net approval 1–4% 5–9% 10–14% ≥15% / Tie

February 2025
Poll source	Date	Sample size	MoE	Approve	Disapprove	Unsure/ Other	Net
Civiqs	Jan 20–Apr 30	22,508 RV		43%	53%	4%	−10%
Emerson College	April 25–28	1,000 RV	± 3.0%	45%	45%	10%	0%
The Economist/YouGov	April 25–28	1,626 RV	± 3.0%	43%	54%	2%	−11%
Yahoo! News/YouGov	April 25–28	1,597 A	± 2.9%	42%	53%	5%	−11%
Navigator Research/Global Strategy Group	April 24–28	1,000 RV	± 3.1%	44%	54%	2%	−10%
NewsNation/Decision Desk HQ	April 23–27	1,448 RV	± 2.4%	43%	56%	1%	−13%
CBS/YouGov	April 23–25	2,365 A	± 2.4%	45%	55%	—	−10%
New York Times/Siena College	April 21–24	913 RV	± 4.3%	42%	54%	4%	−12%
CNN/SSRS	April 17–24	1,678 RV	± 2.9%	41%	59%	1%	−18%
Napolitan News Service	April 16–24	3,000 RV	± 4.3%	49%	48%	2%	+1%
John Zogby Strategies	April 22–23	1,000 RV	± 3.2%	48%	50%	2%	−2%
Beacon/Shaw & Co./FOX News	April 18–21	1,104 RV	± 3.0%	44%	55%	1%	−11%
Associated Press/NORC	April 17–21	1,260 A	± 3.9%	39%	59%	2%	−20%
Ipsos/Reuters	April 16–21	913 RV	± 2.0%	42%	53%	5%	−11%
American Research Group	April 17–20	1,100 A	± 3.0%	43%	53%	4%	−10%
NPI/Franklin News	April 15–18	2,527 RV	± 2.0%	44%	53%	3%	−9%
The Economist/YouGov	April 13–15	1,512 A	± 3.4%	42%	52%	6%	−10%
Atlas Intel	April 10–14	2,347 A	± 2.0%	46%	52%	2%	−6%
CBS News/YouGov	April 8–11	2,410 A	± 2.4%	47%	53%	—	−6%
YouGov	April 7–10	1,151 A	± 4.0%	41%	54%	5%	−13%
Napolitan News Service/RMG Research	April 2–10	3,000 RV	± 1.0%	49%	48%	3%	+1%
YouGov/The Economist	April 5–8	1,563 RV	± 2.9%	45%	52%	3%	−7%
HarrisX	April 4–7	1,883 RV	± 2.3%	47%	49%	4%	−2%
Quinnipiac University	April 3–7	1,407 RV	± 2.6%	41%	53%	6%	−12%
Global Strategy Group/GBAO	April 3–7	1,000 RV	± 3.1%	44%	53%	3%	−9%
Cygnal	April 1–3	1,500 LV	± 2.5%	47%	51%	2%	−4%
J.L. Partners/Daily Mail	April 1–3	1,019 RV	± 3.4%	47%	42%	2%	+5%

==== March 2025 ====
February 2025
Poll source	Date	Sample size	MoE	Approve	Disapprove	Unsure/ Other	Net
CBS/YouGov	March 27–28	2,609 A	± 2.3%	50%	50%	—	0%
Overton Insights	March 24–28	1,200 RV	± 2.8%	46%	51%	3%	−5%
Harvard Caps/HarrisX	March 26–27	2,746 RV	± 1.9%	49%	46%	5%	+3%
Napolitan News Service	March 18–27	3,000 RV	± 1.8%	52%	45%	3%	+7%
Marquette University Law School	March 17–27	1,021 A	± 3.5%	46%	54%	0%	−8%
The Economist/YouGov	March 22–25	1,440 RV	± 3.3%	48%	50%	2%	−2%
Yahoo News/YouGov	March 20–24	1,677 A	± 2.7%	44%	50%	6%	−6%
GBAO/Third Way	March 17–23	2,000 A		48%	50%	2%	−2%
The Economist/YouGov	March 16–18	1,458 RV	± 3.3%	47%	50%	3%	−3%
Fox News	March 14–17	994 RV	± 3%	49%	51%	—	−2%
Global Strategy Group/GBAO/Navigator	March 13–17	1,000 RV	± 3.1%	47%	49%	4%	−2%
North Star Opinion Research/Dynata	March 13–17	1,000 RV	± 3.1%	46%	51%	3%	−6%
Gallup	March 3–16	1,002 A	± 4.0%	43%	53%	4%	−10%
Blueprint Research	March 13–14	1,400 RV	± 3.0%	45%	51%	4%	−6%
Atlas Intel	March 7–12	2,550 A	± 2%	47%	52%	0%	−5%
The Economist/YouGov	March 9–11	1,699 A	± 3.2%	47%	47%	6%	0%
Hart Research/Public Opinion Strategies	March 7–11	1,000 RV	± 3.1%	47%	51%	2%	−4%
Emerson College	March 8–10	1,000 RV	± 3%	47%	45%	8%	+2%
Quinnipiac	March 6–10	1,198 RV	± 2.8%	42%	53%	6%	−11%
CNN/SSRS	March 6–9	1,206 A	± 3.3%	45%	54%	1%	−9%
InsiderAdvantage/Trafalgar	March 5	800 RV	± 3.46%	50%	45%	5%	+5%
Reuters/Ipsos	March 3–4	1,174 A	± 3.1%	43%	50%	6%	−7%
Emerson College	March 2–3	1,000 RV	± 3.0%	48%	43%	9%	+5%
Civiqs/Daily Kos (D)	Feb 28–Mar 3	1,031 RV	± 3.2%	48%	52%	0%	−4%
Emerson College	Feb 28–Mar 2	2,229 RV		49%	48%	3%	+1%

==== February 2025 ====
February 2025
Poll source	Date	Sample size	MoE	Approve	Disapprove	Unsure/ Other
YouGov/CBS News	February 26–28	2,311 A	± 2.5%	51%	49%	—
Tipp Insights	February 26–28	1,434 A	± 2.6%	47%	43%	10%
Napolitan/RMG Research	February 24–28	3,000 RV	± 1.8%	53%	45%	2%
CNN/SSRS	February 24–28	2,212 A	± 2.4%	48%	52%	0%
Atlas Intel	February 24–27	2,849 A	± 2.0%	50%	50%	—
Quantus Insights/TrendingPolitics (R)	February 24–26	1,000 RV	± 3.5%	51%	45%	4%
J.L. Partners	February 24–25	1,001 RV	± 3.4%	45%	39%	16%
The Economist/YouGov	February 23–25	1,444 RV	± 3.4%	48%	47%	5%
Morning Consult	February 21–24	2,225 RV	± 2.0%	50%	47%	3%
Napolitan/RMG Research	February 18–21	3,000 RV	± 1.8%	53%	44%	3%
HarrisX/Harvard	February 19–20	2,443 RV	± 2.0%	52%	43%	5%
The Economist/YouGov	February 16–18	1,451 RV	± 3.2%	50%	47%	3%
Washington Post/Ipsos	February 13–18	1,206 A	± 2.0%	48%	51%	1%
Reuters/Ipsos	February 13–18	4,145 A	± 2.0%	44%	51%	5%
Emerson College	February 15–17	1,000 RV	± 3.0%	48%	42%	10%
Coefficient (R)	February 15–17	2,063 LV	± 3.4%	48%	48%	4%
Quinnipiac University	February 13–17	1,039 RV	± 3.0%	45%	48%	7%
CNN/SSRS	February 13–17	1,206 A	± 2.0%	47%	52%	1%
Gallup	February 3–16	1,004 A	± 4.0%	45%	51%	5%
Morning Consult	February 14–16	2,217 RV		50%	47%	3%
SurveyUSA	February 13–16	2,000 A	± 2.6%	51%	45%	3%
Napolitan/RMG Research	February 10–14	3,000 RV	± 1.8%	55%	43%	3%
Echelon Insights	February 10–13	1,010 LV	± 3.6%	52%	46%	2%
The Economist/YouGov	February 9–11	1,430 RV	± 3.3%	47%	49%	4%
Morning Consult	February 7–9	2,230 RV		50%	48%	2%
Trafalgar/Insider Advantage	February 7–9	1,321 RV	± 3.0%	54%	45%	1%
YouGov/CBS	February 5–7	2,175 A	± 2.5%	53%	47%	—
Napolitan/RMG Research	February 3–6	3,000 RV	± 1.8%	51%	45%	3%
Clarity Campaign Labs	Jan 31–Feb 6	1,102 RV	± 1.5%	48%	43%	9%
Cygnal	February 4–5	1,500 LV		50%	48%	3%
Marquette University	Jan 27–Feb 5	1,063 A	± 3.6%	48%	52%	—
The Economist/YouGov	February 2–4	1,423 RV	± 3.3%	48%	47%	5%
Quantus Insights/TrendingPolitics (R)	February 1–3	1,000 RV	± 3.5%	52%	45%	3%
Morning Consult	Jan 31–Feb 3	2,303 RV		49%	47%	4%
Navigator Research	Jan 30–Feb 3	1,000 RV	± 3.1%	49%	47%	4%
Pew Research	Jan 27–Feb 2	4,999 A		47%	51%	2%
AARP/Fabrizio/Impact	Jan 27–Feb 1	3,000 RV	± 1.8%	48%	47%	5%

==== January 2025 ====
Poll source	Date	Sample size	MoE	Approve	Disapprove	Unsure/ Other
538 aggregate	January 31			49%	44%	7%
Napolitan/RMG Research	January 27–31	4,000 RV	± 1.6%	53%	43%	3%
ActiVote	January 20–31	1,182 A		52%	46%	2%
Emerson College	January 27–28	1,000 RV	± 3%	49%	41%	10%
The Economist/YouGov	January 26–28	1,376 RV	± 3.3%	50%	46%	4%
co/efficient (R)	January 25–28	1,570 LV	± 3.47%	52%	47%	—
Quinnipac University	January 23–27	1,019 RV	± 3.1%	46%	43%	11%
McLaughlin & Associates	January 22–27	1,000 LV		52%	43%	5%
Gallup	January 21–27	1,001 A	± 4%	47%	48%	4%
Reuters/Ipsos	January 24–26	1,034 A	± 4%	45%	46%	9%
Morning Consult	January 24–26	2,302 RV		52%	44%	4%
Research Co.	January 22–24	1,001 A	± 3.1%	50%	46%	4%
Echelon Insights	January 22–24	1,024 LV	± 3.5%	51%	43%	6%
Quantus Insights/TrendingPolitics (R)	January 22–23	1,000 RV	± 3.5%	54%	40%	6%
Atlas Intel	January 21–23	1,882 A	± 2%	50%	50%	0%
RMG Research/Napolitan Institute	January 20–23	3,000 RV	± 1.8%	57%	39%	5%
Big Data Poll/Public Polling Project	January 19–22	2,979 RV	± 1.8%	56%	37%	7%
SoCal Strategies/OnPoint Politics	January 21	742 A		49%	36%	15%
Reuters/Ipsos	January 20–21	1,077 A	± 3.6%	47%	41%	12%
Insider Advantage	January 20	800 RV	± 3.5%	56%	39%	5%

=== Approval of transition as president-elect ===
Poll source	Date	Sample size	Approve	Disapprove	Unsure/ Other
HarrisX/Harvard	January 15–16	2,650 RV	53%	39%	8%
YouGov/The Economist	January 12–14	1,425 RV	47%	36%	17%
Beacon Research/Fox News	January 10–13	922 RV	52%	46%	2%
Navigator Research	January 9–13	1,000 RV	50%	44%	6%
CNN/SSRS	January 9–12	1,205 A	55%	44%	0%
YouGov/The Economist	January 5–8	1,520 RV	51%	39%	10%

== Statewide job approval ratings ==
Polls marked with a (R) or (D) have been identified by FiveThirtyEight as having Republican or Democratic funding, respectively.

Majority approval
Plurality approval
Tie
Plurality disapproval
Majority disapproval

=== Alaska ===
March 2026
Poll source	Date	Sample size	MoE	Approve	Disapprove	Unsure/ Other
Alaska Survey Research	March 19–22, 2026	1,415 RV	± 2.7%	38.1%	53.1%	8.9%

=== Arizona ===
February 2025
Poll source	Date	Sample size	MoE	Approve	Disapprove	Unsure/ Other
Noble Predictive Insights/Arizona Public Opinion Pulse	May 5–7, 2026	996 RV	± 3.1%	40%	58%	2%
Noble Predictive Insights	December 8–11, 2025	1,012 RV	± 3.08%	42%	55%	3%
Kreate Strategies/American Encore (R)	February 5–7, 2025	924 LV	± 3.0%	56%	42%	2%

=== California ===
February 2025
Poll source	Date	Sample size	MoE	Approve	Disapprove	Unsure/ Other
SurveyUSA	October 19–24, 2026	871 RV	± 4.7%	27%	67%	6%
Public Policy Institute of California	May 14–18, 2026	1,707 A	± 3.2%	24%	75%	1%

=== Connecticut ===
November 2025
Poll source	Date	Sample size	MoE	Approve	Disapprove	Unsure/ Other
University of New Hampshire	November 13–17, 2025	786 A	± 3.5%	36%	63%	1%
University of New Hampshire	September 17–23, 2025	878 A	± 3.4%	38%	61%	1%
University of New Hampshire	May 22–26, 2025	868 A	± 3.3%	38%	59%	3%
University of New Hampshire	March 20–24, 2025	924 A	± 3.2%	39%	59%	1%

=== Florida ===
February 2025
Poll source	Date	Sample size	MoE	Approve	Disapprove	Unsure/ Other
Emerson College Polling	March 29–31, 2026	1,125 LV	± 2.8%	45.6%	46.7%	7.7%

=== Georgia ===
February 2025
Poll source	Date	Sample size	MoE	Approve	Disapprove	Unsure/ Other
University of Georgia/Atlanta Journal-Constitution	April 15–24, 2025	1,000 RV	± 3.1%	43%	55%	2%
Tyson Group	January 30–31, 2025	924 LV	± 4.0%	49%	45%	5%

=== Iowa ===
June 2026
Poll source	Date	Sample size	MoE	Approve	Disapprove	Unsure/ Other
Beacon Research (D)/Shaw & Co. Research (R) (Note: Poll conducted for Fox News)	June 23–27, 2026	1,003 RV	± 3%	42%	55%	3%

=== Massachusetts ===
April 2025
Poll source	Date	Sample size	MoE	Approve	Disapprove	Unsure/ Other
Emerson College Polling	May 3–4, 2026	1,000 RV	± 3%	27.5%	61.9%	10.6%

=== Michigan ===
April 2025
Poll source	Date	Sample size	MoE	Approve	Disapprove	Unsure/ Other
John Zogby Strategies	October 31–November 2, 2025	1,001 LV	± 3.2%	38%	62%	–
EPIC MRA	April 28–May 3, 2025	600 LV	± 4%	43%	50%	7%

=== Montana ===
April 2025
Poll source	Date	Sample size	MoE	Approve	Disapprove	Unsure/ Other
Montana State University Billings	October 5–21, 2025	720 V	± 3.65%	25%	56%	14%

=== New Hampshire ===
June 2025
Poll source	Date	Sample size	MoE	Approve	Disapprove	Unsure/ Other
University of New Hampshire	June 19–23, 2025	1,320 RV	± 2.7%	45%	55%	0%

=== New Jersey ===
March 2025
Poll source	Date	Sample size	MoE	Approve	Disapprove	Unsure/ Other
Stockton University	March 18–22, 2025	702 LV	± 3.7%	44%	55%	1%

=== North Carolina ===
April 2025
Poll source	Date	Sample size	MoE	Approve	Disapprove	Unsure/ Other
Catawba College-YouGov	June 1–10, 2026	1,000 A	± 3.83%	42%	55%	3%
High Point University	March 26–April 6, 2026	800 A	± 4.1%	42%	55%	4%
High Point University	January 9–21, 2026	1,000 A	± 3.3%	41%	48%	11%
Harper Polling/Carolina Journal	August 11–12, 2025	600 LV	± 3.98%	47.8%	50.3%	1.9%
Catawba College/YouGov	June 10–26, 2025	1,000 RV	± 3.56%	46%	50%	4%
Meredith College	April 2–8, 2025	759 RV	± 3.5%	41%	56%	3%

=== Ohio ===
April 2025
Poll source	Date	Sample size	MoE	Approve	Disapprove	Unsure/ Other
Bowling Green State University	April 7–14, 2026	1,000 RV	± 3.88%	46%	52%	2%
Bowling Green State University	April 18–24, 2025	800 RV	± 4.0%	47%	48%	5%

=== South Carolina ===
February 2025
Poll source	Date	Sample size	MoE	Approve	Disapprove	Unsure/ Other
Winthrop University	November 8–16, 2025	1,434 A	± 2.97%	46%	49%	5%
Winthrop University	October 2–19, 2025	1,922 A	± 2.23%	46%	47%	7%
Winthrop University	April 18–24, 2025	1,546 A	± 2.49%	44%	45%	11%
Winthrop University	February 21–March 5, 2025	1,220 A	± 2.81%	45%	40%	15%

=== Texas ===
February 2025
Poll source	Date	Sample size	MoE	Approve	Disapprove	Unsure/ Other
University of Texas/Texas Politics Project	June 6–16, 2025	1,331 RV	± 2.83%	44%	51%	5%
University of Texas/Texas Politics Project	April 18–28, 2025	1,200 RV	± 2.83%	47%	46%	7%

=== Utah ===
February 2025
Poll source	Date	Sample size	MoE	Approve	Disapprove	Unsure/ Other
Deseret News and Hinckley Institute of Politics/Morning Consult	October 13–20	875 RV	± 3.0%	46%	51%	2%
Deseret News and Hinckley Institute of Politics/Morning Consult	August 6–11	789 RV	± 3.0%	45%	52%	3%

=== Virginia ===
January 2026
Poll source	Date	Sample size	MoE	Approve	Disapprove	Unsure/ Other
Christopher Newport University	January 13–20, 2026	807 RV	± 4.4%	34%	62%	4%
The Washington Post/Schar School of Policy and Government	September 25–29, 2025	1,002 RV	± 3.4%	43%	55%	2%
Roanoke College	February 17–20, 2025	690 RV	± 4.7%	37%	59%	4%
Virginia Commonwealth University	June 19–July 3, 2025	764 RV	± 4.16%	40%	56%	3%

=== Wisconsin ===
February 2025
Poll source	Date	Sample size	MoE	Approve	Disapprove	Unsure/ Other
TIPP Insights	August 14–18, 2026	1,434 RV	± 2.9%	37%	57%	6%
Marquette Law School	April 8–16, 2026	982 A	± 3.4%	39%	60%	1%
Marquette Law School	June 13–19, 2025	873 RV	± 6.6%	47%	52%	1%
Marquette University	February 19–26, 2025	641 RV	± 4.7%	41%	47%	12%

== Trump issue handling net approval ==
February 2025
Poll source	Date	Sample size	MoE	Overall	Abortion	Civil liberties	Crime	Criminal justice reform	Economy/Jobs	Education	Environment	Foreign policy	Guns	Healthcare	Immigration	Inflation/prices	Israel/Hamas/ Palestine	Managing federal government	National security	Russia-Ukraine	Trade/Tariffs
Morning Consult	April 17-20, 2026	1,707 A	± 3.0%	–8%	−8%	—	—	—	–8%	—	—	–2%	—	–7%	+5%	—	—	—	+5%	–	–1%
The Economist/YouGov	April 17-20, 2026	1,430 RV	± 3.3%	–16%	—	—	—	—	—	—	—	–18%	—	—	—	—	—	—	–5%	–	−23%
Echelon Insights	April 17-20, 2026	1,012 LV	± 3.5%	–16%	—	—	—	—	–18%	—	—	–17%	—	—	–10%	—	—	—	—	—	—
YouGov/CBS	April 8-10, 2026	2,387 A	± 2.4%	−22%	—	—	—	—	−30%	—	—	—	—	—	−12%	−38%	—	—	—	—	—
Reuters/Ipsos	February 18-23, 2026	4,638 A	± 1.5%	−18%	—	—	–9%	—	−20%	—	—	-21%	—	−22%	−15%	−33%	—	—	—	–	—
Quinnipiac University	December 11-15, 2025	1,035 RV	± 3.9%	−14%	—	—	—	—	−17%	—	—	−13%	—	−25%	−10%	—	—	—	—	−20%	−15%
Gallup	February 3–16, 2025	1,004 A	± 4.0%	−6%	—	—	—	—	−12%	—	—	−9%	—	−5%	—	−11%	—	—	—	−6%	−11%
Navigator Research	Jan 30–Feb 3, 2025	1,000 RV	± 3.1%	+2%	—	—	—	—	+1%	—	—	—	—	—	—	—	—	—	—	—	—
Quinnipac University	January 23–27, 2025	1,019 RV	± 3.1%	+3%	—	—	—	—	—	—	—	—	—	—	+1%	—	—	—	—	—	—

== Trump approval on specific issues aggregate polls ==
=== Crime ===
Aggregator	Updated	Approve	Disapprove	Unsure/Other	Lead
RealClearPolitics	April 24, 2026	45.5%	49.8%	5.0%	–4.3%

=== Economy ===
Aggregator	Updated	Approve	Disapprove	Unsure/Other	Lead
RealClearPolitics	April 24, 2026	36.9%	60.5%	2.6%	–18.6%
Silver Bulletin	January 20, 2026	40.4%	56.3%	3.3%	–15.9%

=== Foreign policy ===
Aggregator	Updated	Approve	Disapprove	Unsure/Other	Lead
RealClearPolitics	April 24, 2026	39.0%	56.6%	4.4%	–17.6%

=== Immigration ===
Aggregator	Updated	Approve	Disapprove	Unsure/Other	Lead
RealClearPolitics	April 24, 2026	45.3%	52.6%	2.1%	–7.3%
Silver Bulletin	January 20, 2026	43.8%	53.3%	2.9%	–9.5%

=== Inflation/cost of living ===
Aggregator	Updated	Approve	Disapprove	Unsure/Other	Lead
Economist/YouGov	June 1, 2026	24%	72%	5%	–48%
RealClearPolitics	April 24, 2026	29.7%	67.9%	2.4%	–38.2%
Silver Bulletin	January 20, 2026	35.9%	61.1%	3%	–25.2%

=== Trade and tariffs ===
Aggregator	Updated	Approve	Disapprove	Unsure/Other	Lead
Silver Bulletin	January 20, 2026	39.6%	55.3%	5.1%	–15.7%

=== Handling of Israeli–Palestinian conflict ===
Aggregator	Updated	Approve	Disapprove	Unsure/Other	Lead
RealClearPolitics	October 12, 2025	37.3%	55.4%	7.3%	–18.1%
RealClearPolitics	January 14, 2026	47.3%	46.3%	6.4%	+1.0%

=== Handling of Russo-Ukrainian War ===
Aggregator	Updated	Approve	Disapprove	Unsure/Other	Lead
RealClearPolitics	January 20, 2026	36.3%	56.6%	7.1%	–20.3%

=== Approval of military action against Iran ===
Aggregator	Updated	Approve	Disapprove	Unsure/Other	Lead
Associated Press–NORC Center	July 23–27, 2026	33%	64%	3%	–31%
RealClearPolitics	April 24, 2026	37.4%	56%	6.6%	–18.6%

== Policy-specific support ==
=== 25% tariffs on Mexico and Canada ===
Poll source	Date	Sample size	In favor	Oppose	Unsure/ Other
Echelon Insights	February 10–13, 2025	1,010 LV	41%	50%	9%
Clarity Campaign Labs	January 31–February 6, 2025	1,102 RV	42%	49%	9%
The Economist/YouGov	February 2–4, 2025	1,414 RV	35%	52%	13%
The Economist/YouGov	January 26–28, 2025	1,361 RV	37%	51%	12%

=== 25% tariffs on steel and aluminum imports ===
Poll source	Date	Sample size	In favor	Oppose	Unsure/ Other
The Economist/YouGov	February 16–18, 2025	1,437 RV	34%	47%	19%

=== Abolishing the United States Agency for International Development (USAID) ===
Poll source	Date	Sample size	In favor	Oppose	Unsure/ Other
Emerson College	February 15–17, 2025	1,000 RV	36%	44%	20%

=== Abolishing the Federal Emergency Management Agency (FEMA) ===
Poll source	Date	Sample size	In favor	Oppose	Unsure/ Other
The Economist/YouGov	January 26–28, 2025	1,364 RV	35%	54%	12%

=== Abolishing the Department of Education ===
Poll source	Date	Sample size	In favor	Oppose	Unsure/ Other
Emerson College	February 15–17, 2025	1,000 RV	30%	58%	12%
The Economist/YouGov	February 9–11, 2025	1,430 RV	33%	58%	9%
The Economist/YouGov	January 2–4, 2025	1,414 RV	31%	58%	10%

=== Abolishing the Occupational Safety and Health Administration ===
Poll source	Date	Sample size	In favor	Oppose	Unsure/ Other
The Economist/YouGov	February 9–11, 2025	1,420 RV	18%	70%	12%

=== Banning trans athletes from women's sports ===
Poll source	Date	Sample size	In favor	Oppose	Unsure/ Other
HarrisX/Harvard	February 19–20, 2025	2,443 RV	69%	31%	0%
Echelon Insights	February 10–13, 2025	1,010 LV	65%	28%	8%
The Economist/YouGov	February 9–11, 2025	1,418 RV	65%	27%	8%

=== Building a ballroom on the site of the East Wing ===
Poll source	Date	Sample size	In favor	Oppose	Unsure/ Other
Washington Post/ABC News/Ipsos	October 24-28, 2025	2,725 A	28%	56%	16%

=== Deporting U.S. citizens convicted of crimes to foreign prisons ===
Poll source	Date	Sample size	In favor	Oppose	Unsure/ Other
The Economist/YouGov	February 9–11, 2025	1,420 RV	36%	55%	9%

=== Ending birthright citizenship ===
Poll source	Date	Sample size	In favor	Oppose	Unsure/ Other
Echelon Insights	February 10–13, 2025	1,010 LV	36%	54%	10%
The Economist/YouGov	January 26–28, 2025	1,363 RV	39%	54%	7%
Reuters/Ipsos	January 24–26, 2025	1,034 A	36%	59%	9%
Echelon Insights	January 22–24, 2025	1,024 LV	34%	50%	15%
Atlas Intel	January 21–23, 2025	1,882 A	45%	52%	4%

=== Ending daylight saving time ===
Poll source	Date	Sample size	In favor	Oppose	Unsure/ Other
Beacon Research/Fox News	January 10–13, 2025	922 RV	62%	33%	5%

=== Ending DEI programs in the federal government ===
Poll source	Date	Sample size	In favor	Oppose	Unsure/ Other
The Economist/YouGov	January 26–28, 2025	1,363 RV	43%	47%	10%

=== Ending humanitarian aid to foreign countries ===
Poll source	Date	Sample size	In favor	Oppose	Unsure/ Other
The Economist/YouGov	February 9–11, 2025	1,422 RV	36%	54%	9%

=== Ending production of the U.S. penny ===
Poll source	Date	Sample size	In favor	Oppose	Unsure/ Other
The Economist/YouGov	February 16–18, 2025	1,441 RV	42%	37%	21%
Emerson College	February 15–17, 2025	1,000 RV	46%	29%	25%

==== Total elimination from circulation ====
Poll source	Date	Sample size	In favor	Oppose	Unsure/ Other
Emerson College	February 15–17, 2025	1,000 RV	38%	37%	25%

=== Establishing a sovereign wealth fund ===
Poll source	Date	Sample size	In favor	Oppose	Unsure/ Other
Echelon Insights	February 10–13, 2025	1,010 LV	26%	27%	47%

=== Expanding U.S. Territory ===
Poll source	Date	Sample size	In favor	Oppose	Unsure/ Other
Echelon Insights	January 22–24, 2025	1,024 LV	22%	54%	24%

==== Annexing Canada ====
Poll source	Date	Sample size	In favor	Oppose	Unsure/ Other
Emerson College	February 15–17, 2025	1,000 RV	26%	55%	19%
The Economist/YouGov	February 16–18, 2025	1,449 RV	20%	61%	19%
Echelon Insights	January 22–24, 2025	1,024 LV	16%	68%	16%
Atlas Intel	January 21–23, 2025	1,882 A	22%	65%	14%
Reuters/Ipsos	January 20–21, 2025	1,077 A	15%	64%	21%
HarrisX/Harvard	January 15–16, 2025	2,650 RV	41%	59%	—
YouGov/The Economist	January 12–14, 2025	1,419 RV	18%	64%	18%

===== Through military force (of those supporting annexation) =====
Poll source	Date	Sample size	In favor	Oppose	Unsure/ Other
YouGov/The Economist	January 12–14, 2025	235 RV	29%	55%	15%

==== Annexing the Gaza Strip ====
Poll source	Date	Sample size	In favor	Oppose	Unsure/ Other
The Economist/YouGov	February 16–18, 2025	1,444 RV	16%	61%	23%
Emerson College	February 15–17, 2025	1,000 RV	18%	58%	24%

==== Annexing Greenland ====
Poll source	Date	Sample size	In favor	Oppose	Unsure/ Other
The Economist/YouGov	February 16–18, 2025	1,446 RV	28%	51%	21%
Emerson College	February 15–17, 2025	1,000 RV	30%	44%	25%
Cygnal	February 4–5, 2025	1,500 LV	44%	32%	24%
Atlas Intel	January 21–23, 2025	1,882 A	30%	54%	16%
Reuters/Ipsos	January 20–21, 2025	1,077 A	11%	65%	24%
YouGov/The Economist	January 12–14, 2025	1,421 RV	28%	49%	22%

===== If Greenlanders vote to join =====
Poll source	Date	Sample size	In favor	Oppose	Unsure/ Other
HarrisX/Harvard	January 15–16, 2025	2,650 RV	46%	54%	—

===== Purchase =====
Poll source	Date	Sample size	In favor	Oppose	Unsure/ Other
Clarity Campaign Labs	January 31–February 6, 2025	1,102 RV	30%	50%	20%
Reuters/Ipsos	January 20–21, 2025	1,077 A	16%	59%	26%
HarrisX/Harvard	January 15–16, 2025	2,650 RV	37%	63%	—
Beacon Research/Fox News	January 10–13, 2025	922 RV	37%	57%	6%

===== Through military force (of those supporting annexation) =====
Poll source	Date	Sample size	In favor	Oppose	Unsure/ Other
YouGov/The Economist	January 12–14, 2025	378 RV	22%	66%	12%

==== Retaking control over the Panama Canal ====
Poll source	Date	Sample size	In favor	Oppose	Unsure/ Other
The Economist/YouGov	February 16–18, 2025	1,446 RV	35%	45%	20%
Reuters/Ipsos	January 24–26, 2025	1,065 RV	37%	46%	17%
Atlas Intel	January 21–23, 2025	1,882 A	46%	47%	7%
Reuters/Ipsos	January 20–21, 2025	1,077 A	29%	47%	24%
HarrisX/Harvard	January 15–16, 2025	2,650 RV	41%	59%	—
YouGov/The Economist	January 12–14, 2025	1,421 RV	37%	43%	20%
Beacon Research/Fox News	January 10–13, 2025	922 RV	42%	53%	6%

===== Through military force (of those supporting annexation) =====
Poll source	Date	Sample size	In favor	Oppose	Unsure/ Other
YouGov/The Economist	January 12–14, 2025	477 RV	37%	47%	16%

=== Increasing fossil fuel production ===
Poll source	Date	Sample size	In favor	Oppose	Unsure/ Other
Atlas Intel	January 21–23, 2025	1,882 A	51%	47%	2%

=== Mass deportation of undocumented immigrants ===
Poll source	Date	Sample size	In favor	Oppose	Unsure/ Other
Echelon Insights	February 10–13, 2025	1,010 LV	55%	39%	5%
Clarity Campaign Labs	January 31–February 6, 2025	1,102 RV	54%	39%	7%
The Economist/YouGov	January 26–28, 2025	1,363 RV	52%	43%	4%
Echelon Insights	January 22–24, 2025	1,024 LV	56%	37%	7%
Atlas Intel	January 21–23, 2025	1,882 A	54%	43%	3%
HarrisX/Harvard	January 15–16, 2025	2,650 RV	58%	42%	—

=== Offering refugee status to Afrikaners ===
Poll source	Date	Sample size	In favor	Oppose	Unsure/ Other
The Economist/YouGov	February 16–18, 2025	1,436 RV	24%	41%	36%

=== Pardoning January 6th protestors ===
Poll source	Date	Sample size	In favor	Oppose	Unsure/ Other
Clarity Campaign Labs	January 31–February 6, 2025	1,102 RV	37%	52%	9%
The Economist/YouGov	January 26–28, 2025	1,367 RV	37%	55%	8%
Reuters/Ipsos	January 24–26, 2025	1,034 A	34%	62%	4%
Reuters/Ipsos	January 20–21, 2025	1,077 A	24%	58%	19%

=== Removing federal protections for trans healthcare ===
Poll source	Date	Sample size	In favor	Oppose	Unsure/ Other
Atlas Intel	January 21–23, 2025	1,882 A	51%	45%	3%

=== Renaming the Gulf of Mexico to the "Gulf of America" ===
Poll source	Date	Sample size	In favor	Oppose	Unsure/ Other
HarrisX/Harvard	February 19–20, 2025	2,443 RV	39%	61%	0%
The Economist/YouGov	February 16–18, 2025	1,439 RV	32%	53%	15%
Cygnal	February 4–5, 2025	1,500 LV	28%	48%	24%
The Economist/YouGov	February 2–4, 2025	1,414 RV	31%	54%	14%
Reuters/Ipsos	January 24–26, 2025	1,034 A	25%	70%	5%
Echelon Insights	January 22–24, 2025	1,024 LV	26%	59%	15%
Atlas Intel	January 21–23, 2025	1,882 A	32%	52%	16%

=== Withdrawing from the Paris Climate Accords ===
Poll source	Date	Sample size	In favor	Oppose	Unsure/ Other
The Economist/YouGov	January 26–28, 2025	1,367 RV	37%	47%	15%

=== Withdrawing from the World Health Organization ===
Poll source	Date	Sample size	In favor	Oppose	Unsure/ Other
Clarity Campaign Labs	January 31–February 6, 2025	1,102 RV	37%	49%	14%
The Economist/YouGov	January 26–28, 2025	1,364 RV	36%	56%	8%

== Support for Trump cabinet officials ==
=== JD Vance, Vice President ===
==== Approval ====
Poll source	Date	Sample size	Approve/ Favorable	Disapprove/ Unfavorable	Unsure/ Other
The Economist/YouGov	May 29–June 1, 2026	1604 A	38%	53%	9%
Atlas Intel	January 21–23, 2025	1,882 A	49%	49%	2%
SoCal Strategies/OnPoint Politics	January 21, 2025	742 A	37%	36%	27%
HarrisX/Harvard	January 15–16, 2025	2,650 RV	41%	35%	24%
YouGov/The Economist	January 12–14, 2025	1,425 RV	43%	48%	10%
Beacon Research/Fox News	January 10–13, 2025	922 RV	43%	46%	11%
CNN/SSRS	January 9–12, 2025	1,205 A	30%	38%	32%
YouGov/The Economist	January 5–8, 2025	1,520 RV	44%	47%	9%

==== Favorability ====
===== Aggregate polls =====
Aggregator	Updated	Favorable	Unfavorable	Unsure/Other	Lead
Decision Desk HQ	November 1, 2026	40.5%	50.7%	8.8%	−10.2%
Real Clear Politics	November 1, 2026	40.3%	51.3%	8.4%	−11.0%

=== Trump's cabinet, generally ===
Poll source	Date	Sample size	Approve	Disapprove	Unsure/ Other
Marquette University	January 27–February 5, 2025	1,063 A	47%	52%	—

=== Marco Rubio, Secretary of State ===
Poll source	Date	Sample size	Approve	Disapprove	Unsure/ Other
The Economist/YouGov	January 26–28, 2025	1,371 RV	41%	42%	17%
Atlas Intel	January 21–23, 2025	1,882 A	49%	39%	12%
HarrisX/Harvard	January 15–16, 2025	2,650 RV	39%	29%	33%

=== Scott Bessent, Secretary of the Treasury ===
Poll source	Date	Sample size	Approve	Disapprove	Unsure/ Other
Atlas Intel	January 21–23, 2025	1,882 A	38%	41%	22%

=== Pete Hegseth, Secretary of Defense ===
Poll source	Date	Sample size	Approve	Disapprove	Unsure/ Other
The Economist/YouGov	January 26–28, 2025	1,371 RV	31%	40%	30%
Atlas Intel	January 21–23, 2025	1,882 A	39%	49%	12%
HarrisX/Harvard	January 15–16, 2025	2,650 RV	31%	32%	38%

=== Pam Bondi, former Attorney General ===
Poll source	Date	Sample size	Approve	Disapprove	Unsure/ Other
The Economist/YouGov	March 6-9, 2026	1,563 A	23%	48%	30%
Atlas Intel	January 21–23, 2025	1,882 A	41%	43%	16%
HarrisX/Harvard	January 15–16, 2025	2,650 RV	31%	28%	41%

=== Matt Gaetz, former Attorney General nominee ===
Poll source	Date	Sample size	Approve	Disapprove	Unsure/ Other
Atlas Intel	January 21–23, 2025	1,882 A	26%	62%	12%

=== Robert F. Kennedy Jr., Secretary of Health and Human Services ===
Poll source	Date	Sample size	Approve	Disapprove	Unsure/ Other
The Economist/YouGov	September 12-15, 2025	1,103 A	37%	51%	12%
Atlas Intel	January 21–23, 2025	1,882 A	48%	50%	3%
HarrisX/Harvard	January 15–16, 2025	2,650 RV	44%	35%	21%

=== Kristi Noem, former Secretary of Homeland Security ===
Poll source	Date	Sample size	Approve	Disapprove	Unsure/ Other
YouGov	September 12-15, 2025	1,103 A	33%	58%	8%
HarrisX/Harvard	January 15–16, 2025	2,650 RV	30%	29%	41%

=== Tulsi Gabbard, Director of National Intelligence ===
Poll source	Date	Sample size	Approve	Disapprove	Unsure/ Other
The Economist/YouGov	February 9–11, 2025	1,595 RV	31%	33%	36%
The Economist/YouGov	February 2–4, 2025	1,604 RV	28%	30%	42%
The Economist/YouGov	January 26–28, 2025	1,371 RV	33%	34%	33%
Atlas Intel	January 21–23, 2025	1,882 A	46%	48%	6%
HarrisX/Harvard	January 15–16, 2025	2,650 RV	31%	29%	40%

=== Lee Zeldin, Administrator of the Environmental Protection Agency ===
Poll source	Date	Sample size	Approve	Disapprove	Unsure/ Other
HarrisX/Harvard	January 15–16, 2025	2,650 RV	27%	26%	48%

=== Mike Huckabee, Ambassador to Israel ===
Poll source	Date	Sample size	Approve	Disapprove	Unsure/ Other
HarrisX/Harvard	January 15–16, 2025	2,650 RV	37%	27%	36%

=== Linda McMahon, Secretary of Education ===
Poll source	Date	Sample size	Approve	Disapprove	Unsure/ Other
The Economist/YouGov	January 26–28, 2025	1,371 RV	20%	31%	49%

=== Elon Musk, former head of Department of Government Efficiency ===
Poll source	Date	Sample size	Approve	Disapprove	Unsure/ Other
The Economist/YouGov	July 2 - 7, 2025	1,134 A	28%	62%	7%
SurveyUSA	February 13–16, 2025	2,000 A	42%	49%	9%
The Economist/YouGov	January 26–28, 2025	1,373 RV	45%	50%	4%
Atlas Intel	January 21–23, 2025	1,882 A	45%	51%	4%
HarrisX/Harvard	January 15–16, 2025	2,650 RV	40%	40%	19%

=== Vivek Ramaswamy, former co-head of Department of Government Efficiency ===
Poll source	Date	Sample size	Approve	Disapprove	Unsure/ Other
Atlas Intel	January 21–23, 2025	1,882 A	39%	49%	13%
HarrisX/Harvard	January 15–16, 2025	2,650 RV	34%	32%	19%

=== Mehmet Oz, head of Medicare and Medicaid nominee ===
Poll source	Date	Sample size	Approve	Disapprove	Unsure/ Other
HarrisX/Harvard	January 15–16, 2025	2,650 RV	33%	34%	33%

== Trump job approval by race ==
=== With White Americans ===
July 2025
Poll source	Date	Sample size	MoE	Approve	Disapprove	Unsure/ Other	Net
The Economist/YouGov	November 4–6, 2026	1453 RV	± 3.2%	41%	57%	2%	−16%
The Economist/YouGov	October 23–26, 2026	1453 RV	± 3.2%	44%	54%	2%	−10%
The Economist/YouGov	September 18-21, 2026	1453 RV	± 3.2%	41%	56%	3%	−15%
The Economist/YouGov	July 25-27, 2026	1453 RV	± 3.2%	39%	57%	4%	−18%
The Economist/YouGov	May 29-June 1, 2026	1453 RV	± 3.2%	42%	54%	3%	−12%
The Economist/YouGov	May 1-4, 2026	1453 RV	± 3.2%	42%	54%	3%	−12%
The Economist/YouGov	February 20-23, 2026	1453 RV	± 3.2%	45%	52%	3%	−7%
The Economist/YouGov	July 4–7, 2025	1453 RV	± 3.2%	49%	46%	5%	+3%
The Economist/YouGov	June 27–30, 2025	1453 RV	± 3.2%	50%	47%	3%	+3%
The Economist/YouGov	June 20–23, 2025	1453 RV	± 3.2%	49%	46%	5%	+3%
The Economist/YouGov	June 13–16, 2025	1453 RV	± 3.2%	48%	48%	4%	0%
The Economist/YouGov	June 6–9, 2025	1453 RV	± 3.2%	50%	46%	4%	+4%
The Economist/YouGov	May 30–Jun 2, 2025	1453 RV	± 3.2%	51%	45%	4%	+6%
The Economist/YouGov	May 16-19, 2025	1453 RV	± 3.2%	51%	44%	5%	+7%
The Economist/YouGov	May 2–5, 2025	1453 RV	± 3.2%	49%	46%	5%	+3%
The Economist/YouGov	April 25–28, 2025	1453 RV	± 3.2%	50%	44%	6%	+6%
The Economist/YouGov	April 5–8, 2025	1453 RV	± 3.2%	49%	45%	6%	+4%
The Economist/YouGov	March 22–25, 2025	1453 RV	± 3.2%	55%	41%	5%	+14%
The Economist/YouGov	March 16–18, 2025	1453 RV	± 3.2%	53%	43%	4%	+10%
The Economist/YouGov	March 9–11, 2025	1453 RV	± 3.2%	53%	42%	4%	+11%
The Economist/YouGov	February 23–25, 2025	1453 RV	± 3.2%	55%	39%	5%	+16%
The Economist/YouGov	February 16–18, 2025	1453 RV	± 3.2%	57%	38%	5%	+19%
The Economist/YouGov	February 9–11, 2025	1453 RV	± 3.2%	52%	42%	6%	+10%
The Economist/YouGov	January 26–28, 2025	1453 RV	± 3.2%	56%	39%	6%	+17%

=== With Black Americans ===
July 2025
Poll source	Date	Sample size	MoE	Approve	Disapprove	Unsure/ Other	Net
The Economist/YouGov	November 4–6, 2026	1453 RV	± 3.2%	17%	80%	3%	−63%
The Economist/YouGov	October 23–26, 2026	1453 RV	± 3.2%	15%	79%	6%	−64%
The Economist/YouGov	September 18-21, 2026	1453 RV	± 3.2%	6%	90%	4%	−84%
The Economist/YouGov	July 25-27, 2026	1453 RV	± 3.2%	16%	78%	6%	−62%
The Economist/YouGov	May 29-June 1, 2026	1453 RV	± 3.2%	10%	85%	4%	−75%
The Economist/YouGov	May 1-4, 2026	1453 RV	± 3.2%	9%	80%	11%	−71%
The Economist/YouGov	February 20-23, 2026	1453 RV	± 3.2%	11%	83%	5%	−72%
The Economist/YouGov	July 4–7, 2025	1453 RV	± 3.2%	15%	79%	6%	−64%
The Economist/YouGov	June 27–30, 2025	1453 RV	± 3.2%	16%	78%	6%	−62%
The Economist/YouGov	June 20–23, 2025	1453 RV	± 3.2%	12%	85%	3%	−73%
The Economist/YouGov	June 13–16, 2025	1453 RV	± 3.2%	17%	76%	6%	−59%
The Economist/YouGov	June 6–9, 2025	1453 RV	± 3.2%	20%	71%	9%	−51%
The Economist/YouGov	May 30–Jun 2, 2025	1453 RV	± 3.2%	23%	66%	11%	−43%
The Economist/YouGov	May 16-19, 2025	1453 RV	± 3.2%	17%	76%	7%	−59%
The Economist/YouGov	May 2–5, 2025	1453 RV	± 3.2%	22%	69%	9%	−47%
The Economist/YouGov	April 25–28, 2025	1453 RV	± 3.2%	17%	72%	11%	−55%
The Economist/YouGov	April 5–8, 2025	1453 RV	± 3.2%	26%	66%	8%	−40%
The Economist/YouGov	March 22–25, 2025	1453 RV	± 3.2%	19%	69%	11%	−50%
The Economist/YouGov	March 16–18, 2025	1453 RV	± 3.2%	24%	72%	4%	−48%
The Economist/YouGov	March 9–11, 2025	1453 RV	± 3.2%	22%	63%	15%	−41%
The Economist/YouGov	February 23–25, 2025	1453 RV	± 3.2%	33%	54%	13%	−21%
The Economist/YouGov	February 16–18, 2025	1453 RV	± 3.2%	24%	69%	7%	−45%
The Economist/YouGov	February 9–11, 2025	1453 RV	± 3.2%	28%	63%	8%	−35%
The Economist/YouGov	January 26–28, 2025	1453 RV	± 3.2%	29%	60%	11%	−31%

=== With Hispanic Americans ===
July 2025
Poll source	Date	Sample size	MoE	Approve	Disapprove	Unsure/ Other	Net
The Economist/YouGov	November 4–6, 2026	1453 RV	± 3.2%	32%	64%	4%	−32%
The Economist/YouGov	October 23–26, 2026	1453 RV	± 3.2%	38%	60%	2%	−22%
The Economist/YouGov	September 18-21, 2026	1453 RV	± 3.2%	31%	68%	1%	−37%
The Economist/YouGov	July 25-27, 2026	1453 RV	± 3.2%	31%	65%	4%	−34%
The Economist/YouGov	May 29-June 1, 2026	1453 RV	± 3.2%	33%	67%	0%	−34%
The Economist/YouGov	May 1-4, 2026	1453 RV	± 3.2%	40%	52%	7%	−12%
The Economist/YouGov	February 20-23, 2026	1453 RV	± 3.2%	35%	59%	3%	−24%
The Economist/YouGov	July 4–7, 2025	1453 RV	± 3.2%	26%	67%	7%	−41%
The Economist/YouGov	June 27–30, 2025	1453 RV	± 3.2%	30%	62%	8%	−32%
The Economist/YouGov	June 20–23, 2025	1453 RV	± 3.2%	30%	61%	10%	−31%
The Economist/YouGov	June 13–16, 2025	1453 RV	± 3.2%	31%	60%	9%	−29%
The Economist/YouGov	June 6–9, 2025	1453 RV	± 3.2%	34%	61%	4%	−17%
The Economist/YouGov	May 30–Jun 2, 2025	1453 RV	± 3.2%	38%	56%	6%	−18%
The Economist/YouGov	May 16-19, 2025	1453 RV	± 3.2%	32%	62%	7%	−30%
The Economist/YouGov	May 2–5, 2025	1453 RV	± 3.2%	34%	61%	5%	−27%
The Economist/YouGov	April 25–28, 2025	1453 RV	± 3.2%	31%	67%	2%	−36%
The Economist/YouGov	April 5–8, 2025	1453 RV	± 3.2%	35%	60%	4%	−25%
The Economist/YouGov	March 22–25, 2025	1453 RV	± 3.2%	48%	47%	6%	−2%
The Economist/YouGov	March 16–18, 2025	1453 RV	± 3.2%	31%	61%	8%	−30%
The Economist/YouGov	March 9–11, 2025	1453 RV	± 3.2%	34%	56%	10%	−22%
The Economist/YouGov	February 23–25, 2025	1453 RV	± 3.2%	40%	50%	10%	−10%
The Economist/YouGov	February 16–18, 2025	1453 RV	± 3.2%	40%	55%	6%	−15%
The Economist/YouGov	February 9–11, 2025	1453 RV	± 3.2%	34%	60%	6%	−26%
The Economist/YouGov	January 26–28, 2025	1453 RV	± 3.2%	42%	47%	12%	−5%

== International ==
The Pew Research Center's Spring 2025 Global Attitudes Survey was conducted January 8 to April 26, 2025, in a range of phone and in-person interviews among 28,333 people in 24 countries. The margins of error for each country average about 4 percentage points.

A 2025 Pew Research Center study found that more than half in 19 of 24 countries surveyed said they lack confidence in Trump's leadership of world affairs, with views about Trump differing sharply along ideological and partisan lines.

Among 24 surveyed countries, Trump's 2025 ratings trailed those of Joe Biden's 2024 ratings by an average of twelve percentage points in world affairs, though Trump fared better among right-wing populist parties in Europe.

A 2026 survey of European respondents showed net negative views of Trump concerning world affairs.

== See also ==
- Donald Trump 2024 presidential campaign
- List of heads of the executive by approval rating
- Nationwide opinion polling for the 2024 United States presidential election
- Opinion polling on the first Trump presidency
- Statewide opinion polling for the 2024 United States presidential election
- United States presidential approval rating
