= Voter segments in political polling =

People considered likely to cast a ballot

Voter segments in political polling in the United States consist of all adults, registered voters and likely voters.

== Definitions ==
Political opinion polling in the United States usually surveys one of three population segments.

- All adults are polls in which all Americans age 18 and older have been surveyed. These polls represent the aggregate opinion of all United States residents, regardless of voting eligibility or intent.
- Registered voters are polls in which only Americans who are registered to vote are surveyed. These polls represent the aggregate opinion only of citizens who would be legally able to cast a vote if the election were held on the day the poll was taken and, therefore, necessarily exclude non-citizen residents and, in many jurisdictions, the mentally ill and convicted felons.
- Likely voters are polls in which only Americans who are (a) registered voters, and who, (b) have indicated a high intent of actually voting in the next election, are surveyed.

== Relative values ==
According to the American Association for Public Opinion Research, "there is a consensus in the polling community that it is better to report 'likely' voters than 'registered' voters". Reporting on a Pew study, the Washington Post has noted that polls of "likely voters" represent the "Holy Grail of polling" and are most likely to accurately reflect the outcome of an election.

An analysis of 2010 polling by FiveThirtyEight concluded that polls of "registered voters" that year tended to favor Democratic candidates by a factor of five percentage points over the actual results of the election, while polls of "likely voters" tended to favor Republican candidates by a factor of one percentage point over the actual results of the election. According to the Huffington Post this is because registered voters who are least likely to actually cast a ballot tend to be low-income voters, or persons living in urban areas, which are constituencies that tend to favor Democratic candidates. A 2018 study by the Pew Research Center found that registered voters tend to lean more to the Democratic Party than to the Republican Party, stating that "For those individuals identified as registered to vote by state governments, the voter file has a score (ranging from 0 to 100) describing their likelihood of voting for Democrats or Republicans, with higher numbers indicating a preference for Democrats. According to the full voter file, 55% of all registered voters in the U.S. are likely Democrats and 33% are likely Republicans." An October 2019 report from the Pew Research Center found that, among registered voters, "the Democratic advantage in party affiliation is typically about 3 percentage points smaller than it is among the general public in our surveys... registered voters tend to be older, wealthier and more likely to be non-Hispanic whites and homeowners, all of which are characteristics associated with a higher probability of being a Republican." In addition, a 2017 analysis from the Pew Research Center found that "voter-only polls tend to get somewhat more favorable views of a Republican president or candidate and less favorable views of Democrats. This pattern was evident during Barack Obama's presidency, with his overall ratings tending to be somewhat higher among the general public than among registered or likely voters."

A 2020 report from the Pew Research Center found that in 2018 and 2019, "34% of registered voters identified as independent, compared with 33% who identify as Democrats and 29% who identify as Republicans. The share of registered voters who identify with the Republican Party is up 3 percentage points, from 26% in 2017, while there has been no change in the share who identify as Democrats." The report found wide differences among partisans based on race, gender, and education. The report notes that women are likelier than men to identify with the Democratic Party. The study found that "underlying the gender gap in leaned party identification is a gender difference in voters' straight party identification: Men are more likely to identify as Republicans (31%) than Democrats (26%), while the reverse is true among women (39% identify as Democrats, 28% as Republicans)."

== Methods for identifying "likely voters" ==
Polls targeting "likely voters" generally begin with a list of known registered voters and then ask respondents a series of screening questions before the survey is conducted. Often this can simply be "are you going to vote on Election Day?" with respondents who answer "yes" to the question being included in the survey's final results, and those who answer "no" being excluded. In other cases, complex formulas that account for a variety of demographic and psychographic variables are applied. Pollsters also ask respondents about their past voting history and their intention to vote on Election Day.
