= 2021–2023 inflation surge =

Global inflation following the COVID-19 pandemic

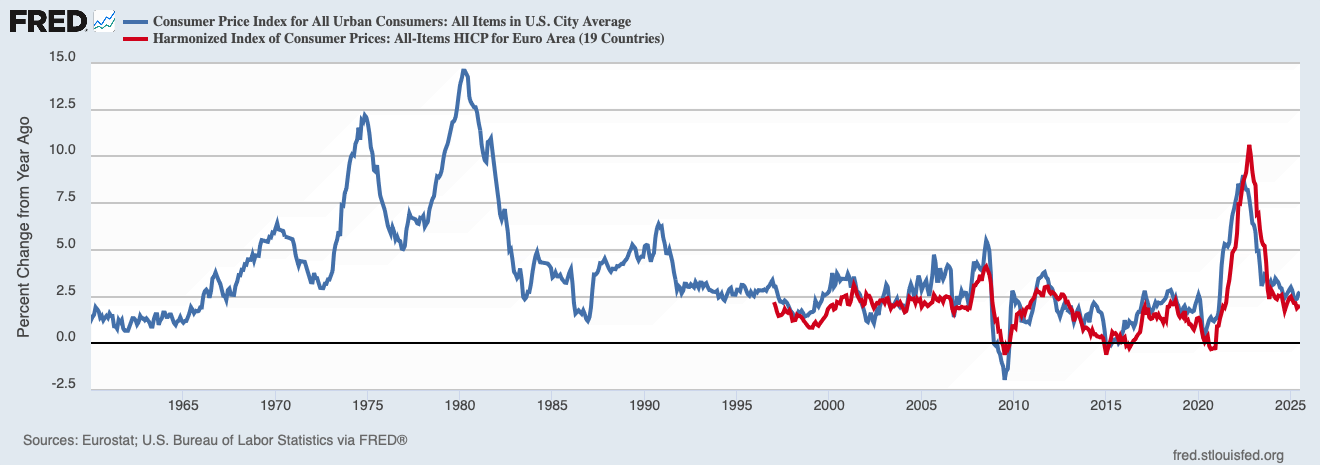
Inflation rate, United States (blue) and eurozone (red), January 1960 through July 2025

Following the start of the COVID-19 pandemic in 2020, a worldwide surge in inflation began in mid-2021 and lasted until mid-2022. Many countries saw their highest inflation rates in decades. It has been attributed to various causes, including pandemic-related economic dislocation, supply chain disruptions, the fiscal and monetary stimulus provided in 2020 and 2021 by governments and central banks around the world in response to the pandemic, and price gouging. Preexisting factors that may have contributed to the surge included housing shortages, climate impacts, and government budget deficits. Recovery in demand from the COVID-19 recession had, by 2021, revealed significant supply shortages across many business and consumer economic sectors.

In early 2022, the effect of the Russian invasion of Ukraine on global oil prices, natural gas, fertilizer, and food prices further exacerbated the situation. Higher gasoline prices were a major contributor to inflation as oil producers saw record profits. Debate arose over whether inflationary pressures were transitory or persistent, and to what extent price gouging was a factor. All central banks (except for the Bank of Japan, which had kept its interest rates steady at −0.1% until 2024) responded by aggressively increasing interest rates.

The inflation rate in the United States and the eurozone peaked in the second half of 2022 and sharply declined in 2023. At its peak, the United States had its highest inflation rate since 1981 and the eurozone its highest since records began in 1997. Despite a worldwide decline, some economists have speculated that higher consumer prices are unlikely to return to pre-pandemic levels and may remain elevated. Economists state that for prices to return to pre-pandemic levels a deflationary period would be required, which is usually associated with recession. In 2024, the United States approached target inflation while growing the economy, also known as a 'soft landing'. As of July 2025, the inflation rate in the U.S. is 2.7%; the Federal Reserve's "target rate" is 2%. It is currently unclear whether more interest rate hikes, or a recession will cause lower inflation rates in the future.

== Background and causes ==
Consumer spending on goods in the United States and elsewhere moved in tandem with spending on services (see goods and services) before the COVID-19 recession, but upon emerging from the recession consumers shifted spending towards goods and away from services, particularly in the United States. This shift placed stress on supply chains, such that the supply of goods could not meet demand, resulting in price increases. In November 2021 inflation in the United States was 14.9% for durable goods, compared to 10.7% for consumable goods and 3.8% for services. Similar situations occurred in several other major economies. Supply chain stresses increased prices for commodities and transportation, which are cost inputs for finished goods.

In countries where food constituted a large part of the inflation increase, rising prices forced low-income consumers to reduce spending on other goods, thereby slowing economic growth. "In those countries with high inflation, consumer spending has weakened because household spending power has taken a hit from rising prices," said William Jackson of Capital Economics, "And you've generally seen much more aggressive moves to tighten monetary policy."

In June 2022, The Atlantic published an editorial article by James Surowiecki, critical towards the U.S. Department of the Treasury controlling inflation. In 2021, Janet Yellen called the risk of inflation "small" and "manageable", and equally Federal Reserve Chairman Jerome Powell thought inflation would be "transitory", even as inflation rose above 6 percent. In 2023, the International Monetary Fund ascertained that "food and energy are the main drivers of this inflation", as rising prices continue to squeeze living standards not only in North America but worldwide.

Six out of ten (59%) EU enterprises were concerned about energy prices in 2023, and five out of ten (47%) were concerned about uncertainty, with some country variations. Energy cost rises were more common in EU businesses than in US firms (93% vs. 83%). Manufacturing businesses were the most likely to have encountered a 25% or more rise in energy spending, while the construction sector had the lowest number of firms suffering a 25% or greater increase in energy spending, although more than half of firms reported this.

=== Supply chain disruptions ===
Some economists attribute the U.S. inflation surge to product shortages resulting from the global supply-chain problems, itself largely caused by the COVID-19 pandemic. This coincided with strong consumer demand, driven by low unemployment and improved financial conditions following the pandemic. The higher demand caused by the U.S. government's $5 trillion aid spending exacerbated supply-side issues in the United States; according to the Federal Reserve Bank of San Francisco researchers, this contributed 3 percentage points to inflation by the end of 2021. They argued that the spending measures were nevertheless necessary to prevent deflation, which would have been harder to manage than inflation.

Consumer prices have reached an all-time high within the last thirty years, soaring by 6.2% from the previous year, things like restaurant prices to clothes and the most popular being fuel, have drastically increased. Fuel prices rose by 49% from January to June 2022 in the United States. During the pandemic, the number of workers working worldwide plunged and had an immediate impact on the United States as less than a third of the global population has been vaccinated. Countries that supplied the United States with shoes and clothes such as Vietnam have had factory hub shortages due to not having enough vaccinated workers. In June 2022, BlackRock CEO Larry Fink argued that consumer demand in the United States had remained steady compared to pre-pandemic years, with supply-chain issues overseas being the primary cause of the post-pandemic inflation surge. He attributed this to some countries taking longer (than the U.S.) to resume economic activity, thereby disrupting international trade.

=== Shifting demand ===
During the COVID-19 lockdown, demand shifts during the pandemic towards many home-related goods outpaced supply, contributing to inflation. Demand for groceries has continued to be high after the pandemic as people's habits have changed, which is one of the factors pushing up grocery prices into 2024. Increasing energy demand is one of the causes of persistent energy inflation.

=== Fiscal and monetary policy ===
Among the factors contributing to the surge of inflation were the unprecedented levels of fiscal and monetary stimulus enacted to sustain household incomes and the liquidity of financial institutions in the 2020–2021 period. Many governments around the world adopted such stimulatory actions early in the COVID-19 pandemic.

Some immediate actions were taken by banking systems around the world by increasing interest rates or making changes to other policies. Higher interest rates make borrowing more expensive, reducing consumption. This is put into place purposely to maintain a level of consumption that will contribute to a steady level of inflation or decrease it, this is also known as inflation targeting.

Deficit spending increases inflation, as detailed in the fiscal theory of the price level. Tax cuts are generally viewed as inflationary while tax hikes are usually viewed as deflationary.

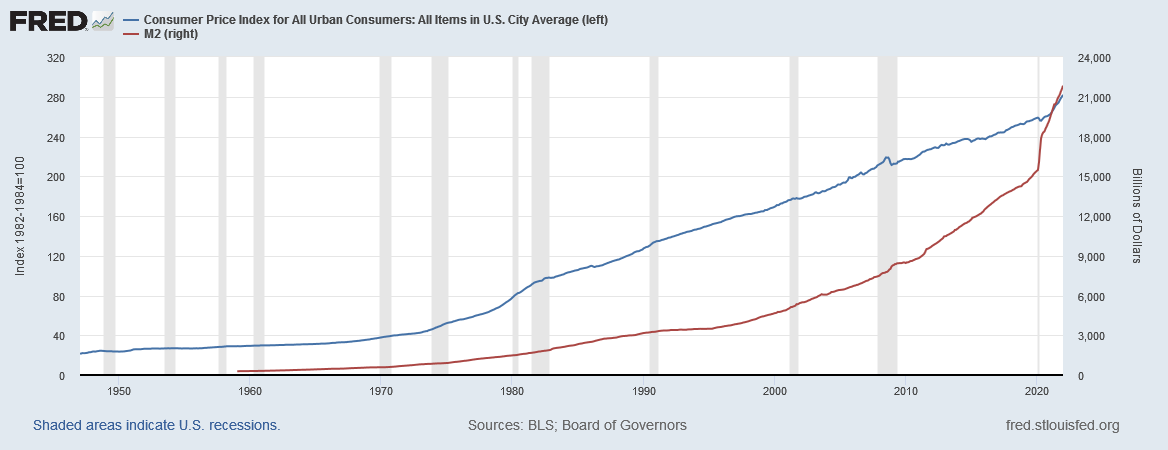
CPI-Urban (blue) vs M2 money supply (red); recessions in gray

Milton Friedman, a libertarian-conservative monetary economist who was awarded the 1976 Nobel Prize in economics, said in 1963 that "inflation is always and everywhere a monetary phenomenon." Austrian school economist Gottfried von Haberler amplified Friedman in 1985, asserting, "there has never been a significant inflation or stagflation — prices rising, say, by 4 percent or more a year for two or more years — without a significant growth in the stock of money." This quantity theory of money has long been popular with libertarian-conservative critics of the Federal Reserve. During the pandemic and its immediate aftermath, the M2 money supply increased at the fastest rate in decades, leading some to link the growth to the inflation surge. Fed chairman Jerome Powell said in December 2021 that the once-strong link between the money supply and inflation "ended about 40 years ago," due to financial innovations and deregulation. Powell's immediate predecessors, Ben Bernanke and Alan Greenspan, had previously concurred with this position. The broadest measure of money supply, M2, increased about 45% from 2010 through 2015, far faster than GDP growth, yet the inflation rate declined during that period — the opposite of what monetarism would have predicted. A lower velocity of money than was historically the case was also cited for a diminished effect of growth in the money supply on inflation.

Surveys of economists conducted by the University of Chicago Booth School of Business in November 2021 and January 2022 showed that more economists agreed than disagreed (with many expressing uncertainty) that while contributing to rising prices in the United States, the global supply chain crisis would not contribute to a higher long-term inflation rate above the Federal Reserve's inflation target and was not the main driver of the inflation surge, but that the combined effect of the stimulative fiscal and monetary policies being implemented in the United States posed a risk of prolonged higher inflation.

=== Housing shortage ===
Lags in the construction of new housing were cited as a major factor in inflation in the US, with Katy O'Donnell of Politico arguing that housing shortages were the single-biggest contributor to inflation. The U.S. Census Bureau found that if housing costs were taken out, inflation at the end of 2023 would have been 1.8% instead of 3.2%. Reuters noted how shelter costs or 'shelter inflation' surged during the pandemic. Artificial scarcity in the supply of housing, due to NIMBYism, has been a significant factor in making housing more expensive. Freddie Mac estimated that the housing shortage surged 52% between 2018 and 2020.

=== Climate change ===
According to a 2024 study by the European Central Bank, weather and climate change should increase food inflation by more than 0.1% per month. Increased insurance premiums have also occurred in areas that experienced more frequent and intense wildfires and floods due to climate change.

=== Price gouging and windfall profits ===
In the United States, some Democratic politicians, economists and observers have used the term "greedflation" to contend that "seller's inflation" exacerbated the inflation surge in the United States.

This term saw so much use that "greedflation" was a candidate for word of the year for the Collins English Dictionary in 2023, and was added to Dictionary.com in 2024. Collins Dictionary defines it as either "the use of inflation as an excuse to raise prices to artificially high levels in order to increase corporate profits" or "an increase in the price of goods and services caused by businesses increasing their prices by more than their costs have risen".

Supporters of the idea argued that the market concentration that has occurred in recent decades in some major industries, especially retailing, has given companies the ability to wield near-monopolistic pricing power. Many economists responded by noting that if these large corporations indeed had so much market power, they could have used it to increase prices at any time, regardless of the pandemic.

In 2022, several economists stated that price gouging could be a minor contributor to continuing inflation, but it is not one of the major underlying causes that started this surge. Justin Wolfers, an economist at the University of Michigan quotes Jason Furman, who served as chair of the Council of Economic Advisers under President Obama said, "Blaming inflation on [corporate] greed is like blaming a plane crash on gravity. It is technically correct, but it entirely misses the point." Wolfers states that companies will always charge the highest prices possible, but that competition keeps prices in check.

Some economists and professors, such as Paul Donovan, Isabella Weber, Albert Edwards, and Z. John Zhang, argue that during times of high inflation consumers know prices are increasing but may not have a good understanding of what reasonable prices should be, allowing retailers to raise prices faster than the cost inflation they are experiencing, resulting in larger profits. Zhang, a professor of marketing at the Wharton School at the University of Pennsylvania said: "In the inflationary environment, everybody knows that prices are increasing. Obviously that's a great opportunity for every firm to realign their prices as much as they can. You're not going to have an opportunity again like this for a long time."

A 2021 analysis conducted by The New York Times found that profit margins across more than 2,000 publicly traded companies were well above the pre-pandemic average during the year, as corporate profits reached a record high. Economists at the University of Massachusetts Amherst found that in 2022 profit margins of US companies reached their highest level since the aftermath of World War II. The economists say firms with a lot of market power in consolidated industries can raise prices under the cover of inflation as a form of implicit cartel-like coordination. European Central Bank economists found in May 2023 that businesses were using the surge as a rare opportunity to boost their profit margins, finding it was a bigger factor than rising wages in fueling inflation during the second half of 2022.

In January 2023, the Federal Reserve Bank of Kansas City, released a study which stated that "...markup growth likely contributed more than 50 percent to inflation in 2021, a substantially higher contribution than during the preceding decade. However, the markup itself is determined by a host of unobservable factors, ... We conclude that an increase in markups likely provides a signal that price setters expect persistent increases in their future costs of production."

Robert Reich, who worked under President Bill Clinton as Labor Secretary, stated, "Nobody believes that price gouging is the main cause of inflation...The question really is whether corporate pricing power is aggravating the situation. And there's a great deal of evidence it is."

A May 2023 New York Times story reported that despite the costs of doing business falling in recent months, many large corporations have continued to raise prices, contributing to the recent inflation surge. The prices of oil, transportation, food ingredients, and other raw materials have decreased as the shocks from the pandemic and the Russian invasion of Ukraine have faded though many businesses have maintained or even increased their prices and profits. This could lead to an economic downturn created by higher interest rates.

An International Monetary Fund study published in June 2023 found that rising corporate profits accounted for almost half of the increase in euro area inflation during the preceding two years.

In July 2023, The Economist criticized the entire concept of greedflation as "nonsense" and argued that rising prices are not due to "greedy companies" but are a natural result of supply and demand issues caused by the cash infusion to the economy which took place during the COVID-19 pandemic.

A December 2023 paper published by the UK-based Institute for Public Policy Research and Common Wealth think tanks stated that corporate profiteering played an important role in the inflation spike of 2022. Corporate profits surged while wages failed to keep pace with rising prices, resulting in the working class suffering the largest decline in disposable and discretionary income since World War II. 2024 studies by the Groundwork Collaborative had similar findings. Libertarian critics, citing a study by the Cato Institute, accused the Groundwork Collaborative study of deliberately "cherry pick[ing] a one-year timeframe [2023] to tell a misleading story", and that profits are not a major factor in inflation.

In the words of Paul Hannon writing for The Wall Street Journal in December 2023, "[t]here is broad consensus among economists that the role of profits in fueling inflation is one feature of the recent inflationary episode that made it different from the 1970s. Yet how much of a role profits played is the subject of controversy."

==== Fossil fuels ====
Shortly after initial energy price shocks caused by the Russian invasion of Ukraine subsided, oil companies found that supply chain constrictions, already exacerbated by the ongoing global COVID-19 pandemic, supported price inelasticity, i.e., they began lowering prices to match the price of oil when it fell much more slowly than they had increased their prices when costs rose.

The major American and British oil producers (Big Oil) reported record profits in 2022. Amid longstanding constraints in refinery capacity, refinery profit margins were higher than their historical averages. In July, the UK imposed a 25% windfall profit tax on British North Sea oil producers, which expected to raise £5 billion to pay for a government scheme that reduced household energy costs. In late October, U.S. President Joe Biden accused the oil and gas sector of "war profiteering" and threatened to seek a windfall profit tax if the industry did not increase production to curb gasoline prices.

Coming out of the COVID-19 pandemic, some argued for the possibility of a base effect phenomenon due to cheaper than normal prices, such as for oil, at the onset of the pandemic, followed by above-average prices which exacerbated the perceived inflation.

Analysis published in June 2023 by the Bureau of Labor Statistics found that from February 2020 through May 2023, gasoline retailing profit margins had increased 62%.

==== Grocery prices ====
An analysis published in early 2024 by the White House Council of Economic Advisers found that grocery and beverage retailers had increased their margins by nearly two percentage points since the eve of the pandemic, to the highest level in two decades. The analysis found that grocer margins had remained elevated as the inflation surge eased, though margins for other types of retailers had fallen back to historical levels. President Joe Biden and others asserted that shrinkflation, a practice of reducing portion or quantity sizes of packaged foods while maintaining the same price, was keeping profit margins higher than usual.

The Federal Trade Commission released a report in March 2024 finding that large grocery retailers "accelerated and distorted" the effects of supply chain disruptions to protect their profits. The analysis found that some large retailers "seem to have used rising costs as an opportunity to further hike prices to increase their profits, and profits remain elevated even as supply chain pressures have eased." The study found some large retailers sought to gain an advantage over smaller competitors by threatening suppliers with large fines if strict delivery requirements were not met, and that in some cases "suppliers preferentially allocated product to the purchasers threatening to fine them." Some suppliers, however, were already contractually bound to supply other retailers. FTC chair Lina Khan said "dominant firms used this moment to come out ahead at the expense of their competitors and the communities they serve." Although the pace of grocery price increases had abated since the 2022 surge, prices had not since fallen overall by 2024. Retailers have said they planned smaller price increases in 2024 as consumers had begun to push back against high prices, causing some retailers to lose sales. The FTC also objected to continued elevated profit margins as evidence that there was not enough competition in the grocery sector. The FTC and several state attorneys general in February 2024 sued to block a proposed $25 billion merger between large grocery chains Kroger and Albertsons, arguing the deal would reduce competition and likely lead to higher consumer prices. Kroger's top pricing executive wrote in a March 2024 internal email, "On milk and eggs, retail inflation has been significantly higher than cost inflation." The meat industry in the United States has also been cited as an example where profits went up industry-wide as prices went up, with some pointing to consolidation and a lack of competition as an underlying cause.

In 2024, Ernie Tedeschi argued that no more than one-fourth of the grocery inflation in the U.S. during COVID could be attributed to greedflation.

In Australia in 2023 and 2024, major supermarket chains Coles and Woolworths received criticism as price gouging, with critics pointing to their 65% share of Australia's grocery market, as well as their higher prices in neighborhoods with less competition.

==== Motor vehicle prices ====
In the United States, higher motor vehicle prices were a significant contributor to the inflation surge. An analysis published in May 2023 by The New York Times found that auto manufacturers and dealers shifted from a high volume-low margin business model before the pandemic to a low volume-high margin model during the pandemic. Manufacturers emphasized higher-margin luxury vehicles, while dealers increased their markups over manufacturer list prices. A study published by the Bureau of Labor Statistics, the agency that tracks consumer prices, found that dealer markups accounted for 35% to 62% of new vehicle inflation from 2019 to 2022. Paul Ryan, the CEO of a shopping app that monitors prices across about 40,000 dealerships, remarked, "it was the best of times for car dealers, for sure." Isabella Weber argues that the shortage of chips gave existing producers a 'temporary monopoly' where they did not have to worry about new entrants, allowing them to raise prices.

== Transitory vs persistent debate ==
A debate arose among economists early in 2021 as to whether inflation was a transitory effect of the world's emergence from the pandemic, or whether it would be persistent. Economists Larry Summers and Olivier Blanchard warned of persistent inflation, while Paul Krugman and U.S. Treasury Secretary Janet Yellen argued it would be transitory. Inflation continued to accelerate during 2021 and into 2022. In response, the Federal Reserve increased the fed funds rate by 25 basis points in March 2022, the first increase in three years, followed by 50 basis points in May, then a succession of four 75 basis point hikes in each of June, July, September, and November. Some analysts considered these increases late and dramatic, arguing they might induce a recession. The combined moves put the fed funds rate at its highest level since the onset of the Great Recession in early 2008. Inflation in the Eurozone hit a record high of 8.1% in May, prompting the European Central Bank to announce that it would raise rates in July by 25 basis points, the first increase in eleven years, and again in September by 50 basis points. By November it had increased rates by a cumulative 200 basis points. After the Fed's third rate increase, Summers said "We are still headed for a pretty hard landing." By November 2022, the inflation rate in the United States had declined five months straight while job creation remained strong and third quarter real GDP growth was 3.2% on strong consumer spending, leading a growing number of investors to conclude a hard landing might be averted.

== Impact of the 2022 Russian invasion of Ukraine ==
The retail price of gasoline in the US increased at the outbreak of war in Ukraine.

The retail price of diesel fuel in the US increased at the outbreak of war in Ukraine.

Mark Zandi, chief economist of Moody's Analytics, analyzed United States Consumer Price Index components following the May 2022 report that showed an 8.6% inflation rate in the U.S. He found that by then the 2022 Russian invasion of Ukraine was the principal cause of higher inflation, comprising 3.5% of the 8.6%. He said oil and commodities prices jumped in anticipation of and response to the invasion, leading to higher gasoline prices. The resulting higher diesel prices led to higher transportation costs for consumer goods, notably food. Gernot Wagner argued that most of inflation was caused by the invasion.

Russian gas supply curbs, which began in 2021, aggravated energy crunch caused by demand growth and global supply limitations during the post-pandemic restrictions recovery. In Europe, gas prices increased by more than 450%, and electricity by 230% in less than a year. On February 22, 2022, before the Russian invasion, the German Government froze the Nord Stream 2 pipeline between Russia and Germany, causing natural gas prices to rise significantly.

On February 24, Russian military forces invaded Ukraine to overthrow the democratically elected government, and replace it with a Russian puppet government. Before the invasion, Ukraine accounted for 11.5% of the world's wheat crop market, and contributed 17% of the world's corn crop export market, and the invasion caused wheat and corn from Ukraine unable to reach international market, causing shortages, and result in dramatic rise in prices, that exacerbated to foodstuffs and biodiesel prices. Additionally, the price of Brent Crude Oil per barrel rose from $97.93 on February 25 to a high of $127.98 on March 8, this caused petrochemicals and other goods reliant on crude oil to rise in price as well.

The effect of sanctions on the Russian economy caused annual inflation in Russia to rise to 17.89%, its highest since 2002. Weekly inflation hit a high of 0.99% in the week of April 8, bringing YTD inflation in Russia to 10.83%, compared to 2.72% in the same period of 2021.

== Regional impacts ==
While most countries saw a rise in their annual inflation rate during 2021 and 2022, some of the highest rates of increase have been in Europe, Brazil, Turkey and the United States. By June 2022, nearly half of Eurozone countries had double-digit inflation, and the region reached an average inflation rate of 8.6%, the highest since its formation in 1999. In response, at least 75 central banks around the world have aggressively increased interest rates. However, the World Bank warns that combating inflation with rate hikes has increased the risk of a global recession.

Average annual inflation
Country/Region	2020	2021	2022	2023
Argentina	42.0%	48.4%	72.4%	–
Australia	0.9%	2.8%	6.6%	5.6%
Brazil	3.2%	8.3%	9.3%	4.6%
Canada	0.7%	3.4%	6.8%	3.9%
China	2.5%	0.9%	1.9%	0.2%
Japan	0.0%	−0.2%	2.5%	3.3%
South Korea	0.5%	2.5%	5.1%	3.6%
Turkey	12.3%	19.6%	72.3%	53.9%
United Kingdom	0.9%	2.6%	9.1%	6.8%
United States	1.3%	4.7%	8.0%	4.1%
Europe and Central Asia	1.2%	3.3%	10.4%	7.8%
European Union	0.5%	2.6%	8.8%	6.3%
Latin America and Caribbean	1.0%	3.9%	7.7%	4.6%
South Asia	5.7%	5.5%	7.7%	8.5%
Sub-Saharan Africa	3.8%	4.3%	9.5%	7.1%
Arab World	1.6%	3.0%	5.0%	3.6%
East Asia & Pacific (excluding high income)	2.4%	2.5%	5.5%	3.7%
World	1.9%	3.5%	8.0%	5.8%

=== North Africa and Middle East ===
Countries in North Africa were disproportionally affected by inflation. Tunisia went through a crisis triggered by soaring energy prices and unprecedented inflation of foods in 2022. Moroccan household finances also were negatively affected by imported inflation. Annual inflation rates in North African countries rose to 15.3 percent compared to 6.4 percent in 2021, according to the Central Agency for Public Mobilization and Statistics.

In some North African countries, the inflation surge has encouraged hoarding practices by consumers. Price increases for basic food staples, such as coffee, were particularly high in parts of Asia and North Africa, where people spend a higher proportion of income on food and fuel than in the United States and Europe. Food producers of Nestlé's Middle East and North Africa (MENA) unit have noticed the stock-piling of non-perishable items, as a reaction to the surging inflation. Karim Al Bitar, head of consumer research and market intelligence at MENA, said that the company is considering making some products "more affordable" to consumers.

In Turkey, retail prices rose 9.65% in December compared to November, for an annual rate of 34%. Some of the largest increases were for electricity, natural gas, and gasoline. The economy was further strained by a currency crisis caused by a series of rate cuts by the central bank; the Turkish lira lost 44% of its value against the dollar in 2021. By August 2022, Turkey's inflation rate was 80.21%.

=== Sub-Saharan Africa ===
According to the IMF, median inflation approached 9% in August. Rising prices of food and "tradable goods like household products" have contributed most to this increase.

=== North America ===
==== United States ====
===== 2021–2022 =====
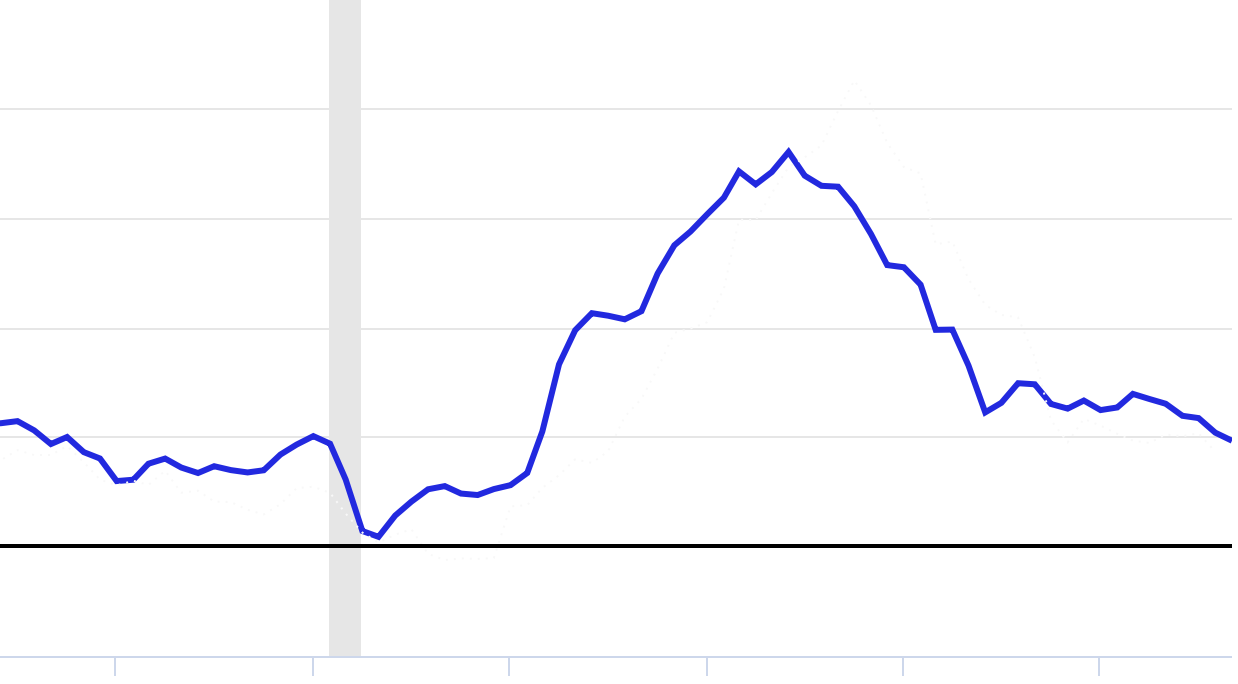
Post-covid inflation spike in the US, gray column marks start of COVID in US (2018–2024)

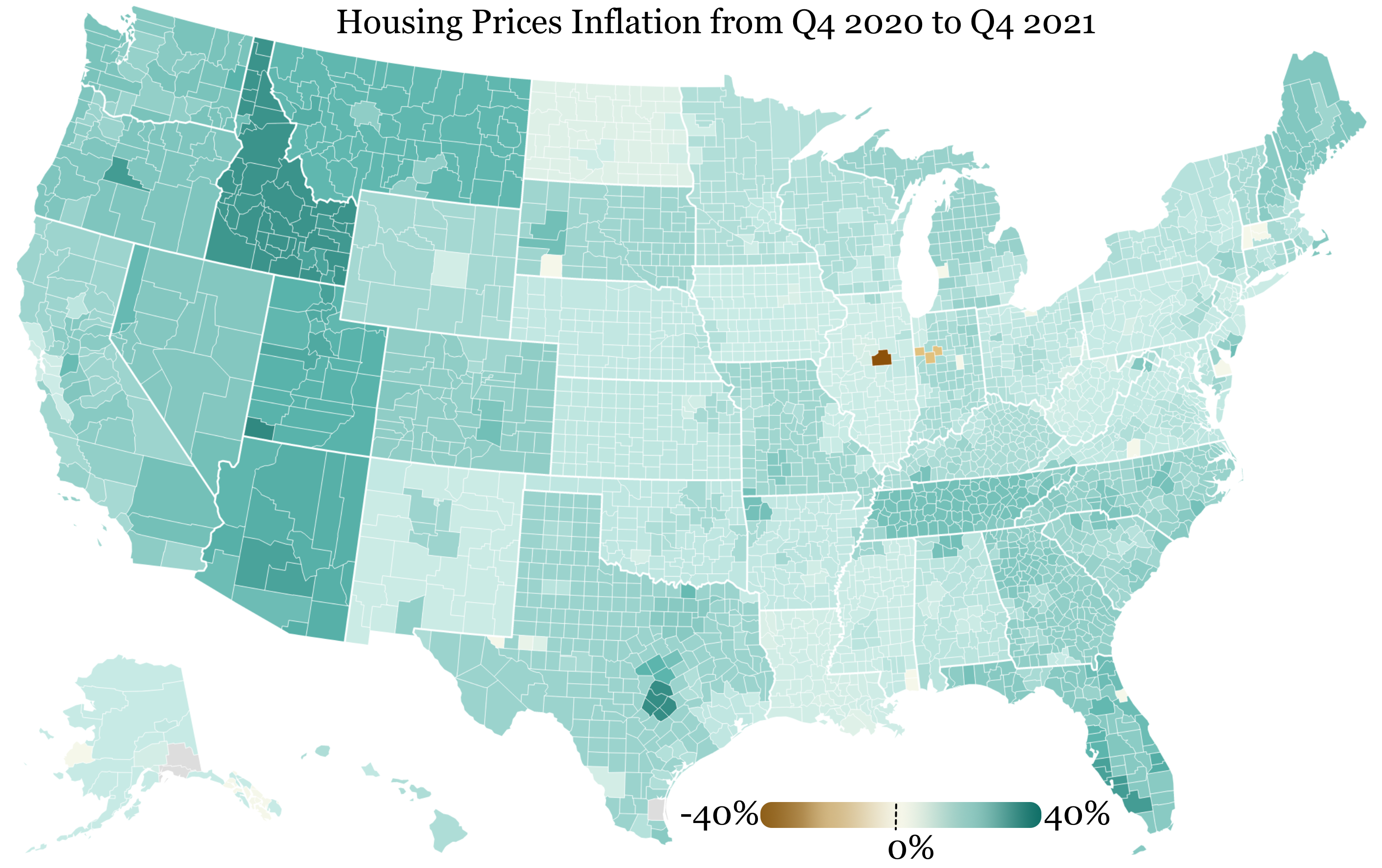
Housing prices inflation from Q4 2020 to Q4 2021 in the United States 40% 20% 0% -20% -40%

In the United States, reports about post-pandemic inflation began circulating in May 2021, when the CPI was listed at 5%, the first time since just prior to the Great Recession of 2008.

By October 2021, annual inflation was reportedly 6.2%, caused largely by higher fuel prices and global supply chain constraints. By December 2021, further increases for the price of gasoline, food, and housing drove annual inflation to 6.8%.

By March 2022, the Russian invasion of Ukraine caused food and energy prices to begin climbing in the United States and across the world.

In response, the Federal Reserve begin imposing interest rate hikes, seven of which would occur throughout 2022. The first occurred on March 16, 2022, by 0.25 points, targeting an effective federal funds rate of 0.25% to 0.50%. The second occurred on May 5, 2022, this time by 0.50 points, raising the funds rate to a target of 0.75% to 1.00%.

By June 2022, inflation in the US peaked at 9.1%, a record not seen since 1981. Higher energy costs and housing shortages were cited as major factor. Amidst a 40-year high in inflation, the Fed imposed a third rate hike on June 16, 2022, this time by 0.75%. Despite the hike, inflation continued to outpace growth in wages and spending. According to the Economic Policy Institute, the minimum wage was worth less than any time since 1956 due to inflation. Nevertheless, the hikes were seen as faster and sooner than the response by the European Central Bank, so while the euro fell, the dollar remained relatively strong, helping it to be the more valuable currency for the first time in 20 years.

The fourth rate hike occurred on July 27, 2022, by 0.75 points, bringing the funds rate to a range between 2.25% and 2.5%. On July 28, data from the BEA showed that the economy shrunk for the second quarter in a row, which aligned with a general definition of a recession. BLS data showed that inflation eased in July to 8.5% from the 40-year peak reached in June at 9.1%. Annual inflation again eased to 8.3% in August 2022, however grocery prices continued to rise.

Inflation remained at 8.2% in September 2022. On September 22, 2022, the Fed increased the interest for a fifth time in the year reaching a 14-year high, delivering another 0.75 points to bring rates to 3.00–3.25%.

On November 3, 2022, the Fed increased rates for a sixth time, again by 0.75 points, targeting another fed funds rate range of 3.75% to 4.00%. While year-over-year inflation rate was 7.1%, lower than it had in December 2021, this was still much higher than average.

A seventh and final rate hike for the year occurred on December 15, 2022, where the Fed increased rates by 0.50 points, bringing the benchmark interest rate to just under 4.5%.

A 2022 analysis by the Federal Reserve Bank of Kansas City ascertained the role America is playing in the current inflationary trend worldwide. Before 2019, the U.S. was seen as a last resort for consumer spending during a global recession, but after 2020, U.S. exports have contributed to foreign inflation. At the same time, energy prices had gone up as well as the value of the U.S. dollar, which both increased monetary pressures on nations that mostly rely on energy imports. In effect, the strength of the U.S. dollar and sanctions on energy commodities have contributed to global inflation in 2022.

Inflation is believed to have played a major role in a decline in the approval rating of President Joe Biden, who took office in January 2021, being net negative starting in October of that year. Many Republicans blamed stimulus spending by Biden and fellow Democrats for fueling the surge; while some economists have argued that the government's COVID stimulus during 2020 under Trump, as well as the Federal reserve's inactions thereafter, and more stimulus under Biden, started the 2021 inflation spike.

===== 2023–2024 =====
After peaking at 9.1% in June 2022, the United States inflation rate declined steadily into 2023, representing overall disinflation. Analysis conducted by NerdWallet on October 2023 data found that prices for 92 of the 338 goods and services measured in CPI had declined from one year earlier, representing deflation for those items. The Farm Bureau annual survey found the average cost of a Thanksgiving dinner would be down 4.5% from 2022.

In March 2023, Federal Reserve chairman Jerome Powell said that the primary drivers of inflation at the time were supply chain problems, consumers' change to purchases of goods rather than services, and the tight labor market.

An analysis conducted in May 2023 by Politico found that in the United States, wage growth for the bottom 10th percentile of the wage scale beat inflation by a strong 5.7% from 2020 through 2022. For the middle 50th percentile, real wages were down by 1%, while they were down 5% for the top 90th percentile.

On July 26, 2023, the FED raised the interest rate to 5.5%, the highest since 2001; in October, the 10-year Treasury yield rose to 5%, a 16-year high, while the 30-year fixed mortgage rate rose to 8%, a 23-year high. 2023 was the worst year for US home sales since 1995. Despite gloom numbers, the US defied recession fears with 3.3% growth in the fourth quarter.

A report issued in August 2023 found no evidence linking President Joe Biden's Inflation Reduction Act of 2022 to increased or decreased inflation. Gernot Wagner argued that the benefits of the Act would likely not be felt before the 2024 election, but that the act is a great long-term strategy to decouple from volatile energy markets that drive inflation.

At the end of 2023, the U.S. Census Bureau found that if housing inflation were taken out, inflation would have been 1.8% instead of 3.2%. Climate-change also exacerbated home insurance premiums in the U.S., which rose 33% between 2020 and 2023.

In April 2024, the annual inflation rate in the United States was 3.5% for the twelve months ending in March, compared to 7% in 2021 and 6.5% in 2022.

An April 2024 Wall Street Journal poll across seven political swing states in the United States found that 74% of respondents thought inflation had worsened over the preceding year, though the inflation rate had declined by nearly half from one year earlier. On net, respondents in every state said the economy had improved in their state over the past two years, though they believed the national economy had worsened. Numerous surveys showed that respondents considered inflation the single most important indicator of economic performance and that consumers were more likely to perceive inflation as price levels rather than the pace of price increases. The Federal Reserve February 2024 Survey of Consumer Expectations found that consumers had a median expectation of a 3.0% inflation rate in the coming year, and 2.7% over a three-year time horizon.

The inflation surge and aggressive Federal Reserve response caused widespread concern among economists and market analysts that a U.S. recession would imminently result. As the Federal Reserve sharply increased the fed funds rate to combat the inflation surge, the longest and deepest Treasury inverted yield curve in history began in July 2022. Many analysts consider an inverted yield curve to be a harbinger of recession. No recession had materialized by July 2024, economic growth remained steady, and a Reuters survey of economists that month found they expected the economy to continue growing for the next two years. An earlier survey of bond market strategists found a majority no longer believed an inverted curve to be a reliable recession predictor.

July 2024 data showed that the inflation rate had dropped to 2.9%, the lowest since March 2021, with used car prices returning to normal following the 2020–2023 global chip shortage. Increases in rent, childcare and electricity still outpaced inflation at around 5%. According to think-tank Energy Innovations, electricity prices may continue rising due to incentives for investor-owned utilities in the United States to overspend on capital projects for transmission lines and distribution lines instead of on distributed and renewable electricity generation which reduces the amount spent on transmission networks that climate change has made more expensive to build and maintain. An August 2024 survey of inflation expectations showed consumers predicting 2.3% average inflation over the next three years, the lowest figure since the survey was created in 2013.

Inflation was reportedly voters' primary issue in the November 2024 U.S. presidential election, given the common association by voters between the health of the economy with the incumbent administration, and was therefore speculated by some to be the main reason behind then former President Donald Trump's victory.

===== 2025–present =====
However, following the 2024 election, then President-elect Trump began escalating tariff threats on China and Mexico, causing some to fear exacerbated inflation during the start of his presidency. By January 10, 2025, long-term inflation expectations rose to 3.3 percent from 3.0 percent in December 2024, the highest level since June 2008, according to a University of Michigan survey.

In February 2025, following the start of the second Trump Administration, consumer inflation in the United States reportedly dropped to 2.8% on a year-over-year basis, but this data was still above the Federal Reserve's target rate of 2% and was projected to climb following Trump's implementation of tariffs. An April 2025 CPI report showed annual inflation had slowed to 2.3%, however this figure again had not yet taken into account the full impact of the Trump Administration's tariffs on the economy, which were imposed at the start of the month, as many were given a 90-day pause pending further trade deals.

In May 2025, the national average for gasoline across the United States reached a four-year low of $3.08 per gallon, down 50 cents from 2024, and $1.52 from 2022 during the height of the inflation surge.

By July 2025, annual inflation increased to 2.7%, corresponding with earlier warnings from economists that the U.S. tariffs will soon be passed along to consumers enough to be reflected in the Bureau of Labor and Statistics' CPI reports.

The cause for the 2021–2023 inflation surge in the United States has generally been believed to be a combination of factors, including the increasing of money supply from the fiscal stimulus provided in 2020 and 2021, supply chain constraints following the reopening of the United States economy in mid-2021, and energy price shocks resulting from the Russo-Ukraine war in 2022.

In September 2026, the Federal Reserve raised interest rates for the first time since 2023, a decision shaped by a combination of domestic economic resilience and elevated energy prices stemming from the Iran war.

==== Canada ====
Canada also saw multi-decade highs in inflation, hitting 5.1% in February 2022 and further increasing to 6.7% two months later. In April, inflation rose again to 6.8%, before jumping to 7.7% in May, the highest ever since 1983.

==== Mexico ====
In July 2022, Mexico's INEGI reported a year-on-year increase in consumer prices of 8.15%, against a Central Bank target of 2–4%.

=== South America ===
In Brazil, inflation hit its highest rate since 2003 — prices rose 10.74% in November 2021 compared to November 2020. Economists predicted that inflation has peaked and that the economy may be headed for recession, in part due to aggressive interest rate increases by the central bank.

According to Austing Rating data, Brazil ended 2022 with the sixth lowest G20 inflation rate. Inflation recorded in Brazil in 2022 was below the United States for the first time in 15 years, in addition to being lower than that of the United Kingdom and the 6th lowest in the G20 (group of the 19 largest and most important economies in the world and the European Union).

In Argentina, a country with a chronic inflation problem, the interest rate was hiked to 69.5% in August, as inflation has further deteriorated hitting a 20-year high at 70%, and is forecasted to top 90% by the end of the year. Inflation hit past 100% in February 2023 for the first time since 1991. Argentina's December 2023 annual inflation was the highest in the world at 211.4%.

Chile had low inflation for several years thanks to the monetary policy of its autonomous central bank. However, in 2022 there was a record intranual inflation of 14.1%, the highest in the last 30 years. There is a consensus among economists that Chilean inflation is mainly caused by endogenous factors, especially the aggressive expansionary policies during the COVID-19 pandemic and the massive withdrawals from pension funds. Economists have also predicted a possible recession by 2023 due to high interest rates to combat inflation.

=== Europe ===
In the Netherlands, the average 2021 inflation rate was the highest since 2003. With energy prices having increased by 75%, December saw the highest inflation rate in decades. In 2023, the Netherlands fell into recession from April to June.

In the UK, inflation reached a 40-year high of 10.1% in July 2022, driven by food prices, and further increase is anticipated in October when higher energy bills are expected to hit. In September, the Bank of England warned the UK may already be in recession and in December, the interest rate was raised by the ninth time in the year to 3.5%, the highest level for 14 years.

UK food and drink prices rose by 19.2% in the year to March 2023, a 45-year high. On 3 August the BoE raised the interest rate to 5.25%, the highest since 2008. The UK entered a technical recession in the final six months of 2023.

Germany's inflation rate reached 11.7% in October 2022, the highest level since 1951. In 2023, Germany fell into recession from January to March due to persistent inflation.

In France, inflation reached 5.8% in May, the highest in more than three decades.

An estimated 70,000 people protested against the Czech government as a result of rising energy prices.

In June 2022, the European Central Bank (ECB) decided to raise interest rates for the first time in eleven years due to the elevated inflation pressure. In July, the euro fell below the U.S. dollar for the first time in 20 years, mainly due to fears of energy supply restrictions from Russia, but also because the ECB lagged behind the US, UK and other central banks in raising interest rates. Eurozone inflation hit 9.1% and 10% in August and September, respectively, prompting the ECB to raise interest rates for a second time in the year to 1.25% in early September. In October, the inflation hit 10.7%, the highest since records began in 1997.

In 2023, the Eurozone fell into recession from January to March and also in March, the Eurozone core inflation hit a record 5.7%, the highest level since records began in 2001. On 14 September, the ECB raised the interest rate for the tenth consecutive time to 4%, the highest since the euro was launched in 1999.

=== Asia ===
In April 2022, the Philippines recorded 6.1% inflation, its highest since October 2018. The Philippine Statistics Authority forecasted that the number would most likely be higher in the following months. President Bongbong Marcos, who succeeded Rodrigo Duterte by June 30, and barely a week into his presidency claimed that the record inflation rate was "not that high". On January 5, 2023, the Philippines rapidly increased to a record-breaking 8.1% inflation from December 2022.

In October 2022, the Japanese yen touched a 32-year low against the U.S. dollar, mainly because of the strength of the latter. In November, the Japanese core inflation rate reached a 41-year high of 3.7%.

=== Oceania ===
Inflation in New Zealand exceeded forecasts in July 2022, reaching 7.3%, which is the highest since 1990. Economists at ANZ reportedly said they expected faster interest rate increases to counteract inflationary pressures.

In Fiji, inflation rose to 4.7% in April 2022 compared to −2.4% in 2021. Food prices rose by 6.9% in April 2022, fuel increased by 25.2%, kerosene by 28.5% and gas by 27.7%.

In November 2023, Australia lifted the interest rate to 4.35%, a 12-year high.

== Electoral impacts ==
In the 2024 U.S. presidential election, all 50 states and DC swung rightward, as did around 90% of counties.

In 2024, for the first time ever, every governing party facing election in a developed country lost vote share, and many experienced their worst electoral performances in decades. These governing parties had a variety of ideological leanings, in many different countries.

This was widely attributed to the worldwide impact of inflation, as economic sentiment across the world dropped. The electoral declines occurred after inflation had peaked and started decreasing, meaning that electorates assigned blame with the benefit of hindsight.

The United States Democratic Party lost the 2024 presidential election and 3% in vote share, while losing the popular vote for the first time since 2004 and winning the same vote share of 48.3% in both elections. The election was very close due to political polarization, with the Democratic Party losing the popular vote by 1.5% and the tipping-point state by 1.7%. Despite the popular vote margin of victory being the closest since 2000, the swings to the right were nearly everywhere. All 50 states and D.C. shifted rightward by varying margins, the first time they all swung in the same direction since 1976. Around 90% of U.S. counties swung rightward, and not a single county flipped Democratic, the first time since 1932 that a party failed to flip a single county. The Democratic Party also won the highest-income voters while losing the presidential election. Specifically, Democratic nominee Kamala Harris's strongest income demographic consisted of voters making over $200,000 a year.

The United Kingdom's Conservative Party experienced the worst defeat in their history, losing 19.9% in vote share and receiving just 23.7% of the vote in the 2024 general election, winning fewer seats than even their landslide defeat in 1906. This was the Labour Party's first victory in 19 years, with the Labour vote share of 33.7% making it the least proportional general election in British history according to the Gallagher index.

In some countries, previously minor parties won their first electoral majorities and defeated long-time dominant parties. In the 2024 Botswana general election, the Botswana Democratic Party lost its parliamentary majority for the first time since Botswana's independence in 1966, ending 58 years of being the country's dominant party. The Umbrella for Democratic Change won its first parliamentary majority in Botswana. In the 2024 Sri Lankan presidential election and 2024 Sri Lankan parliamentary election, the National People's Power won in landslides after having previously been a minor party.

In countries where the incumbent party remained in power, they often lost their majorities in their respective parliaments. This included Japan, where the Liberal Democratic Party (LDP), who have governed the country nearly continuously since 1955, suffered its worst loss since 2009, as voters grappled with rising housing costs and inflation. India's Bharatiya Janata Party (BJP) lost the parliamentary majority that it had held since 2014, with voters citing inflation as a top issue. In South Africa, the ruling African National Congress (ANC) lost the parliamentary majority that it had held since the inaugural post-apartheid election in 1994.

In South Korea, the 2024 parliamentary midterm elections resulted in incumbent president Yoon Suk Yeol's party suffering an electoral defeat, which weakened his political power. On 3 December 2024, Yoon declared martial law in South Korea, the first time it had been declared since the military dictatorship of Chun Doo-hwan in 1980, accusing members of the National Assembly of supporting North Korea; however, Yoon lifted it after the National Assembly passed an emergency motion nullifying the declaration several hours after Yoon's speech. Yoon was successfully impeached and suspended from his presidential powers on 14 December 2024.

This trend continued into early 2025. In the 2025 German federal election, the three parties of the formerly governing "Traffic light coalition" all lost support. In particular, the centre-left Social Democratic Party (SPD) lost over 9% and dropped to third rank with just 16.4% of the vote, their worst result since 1887.

== See also ==
- 2020s commodities boom
- 2022 stock market decline
- Cost-of-living crisis
