= Lindsay Owens =

American economist

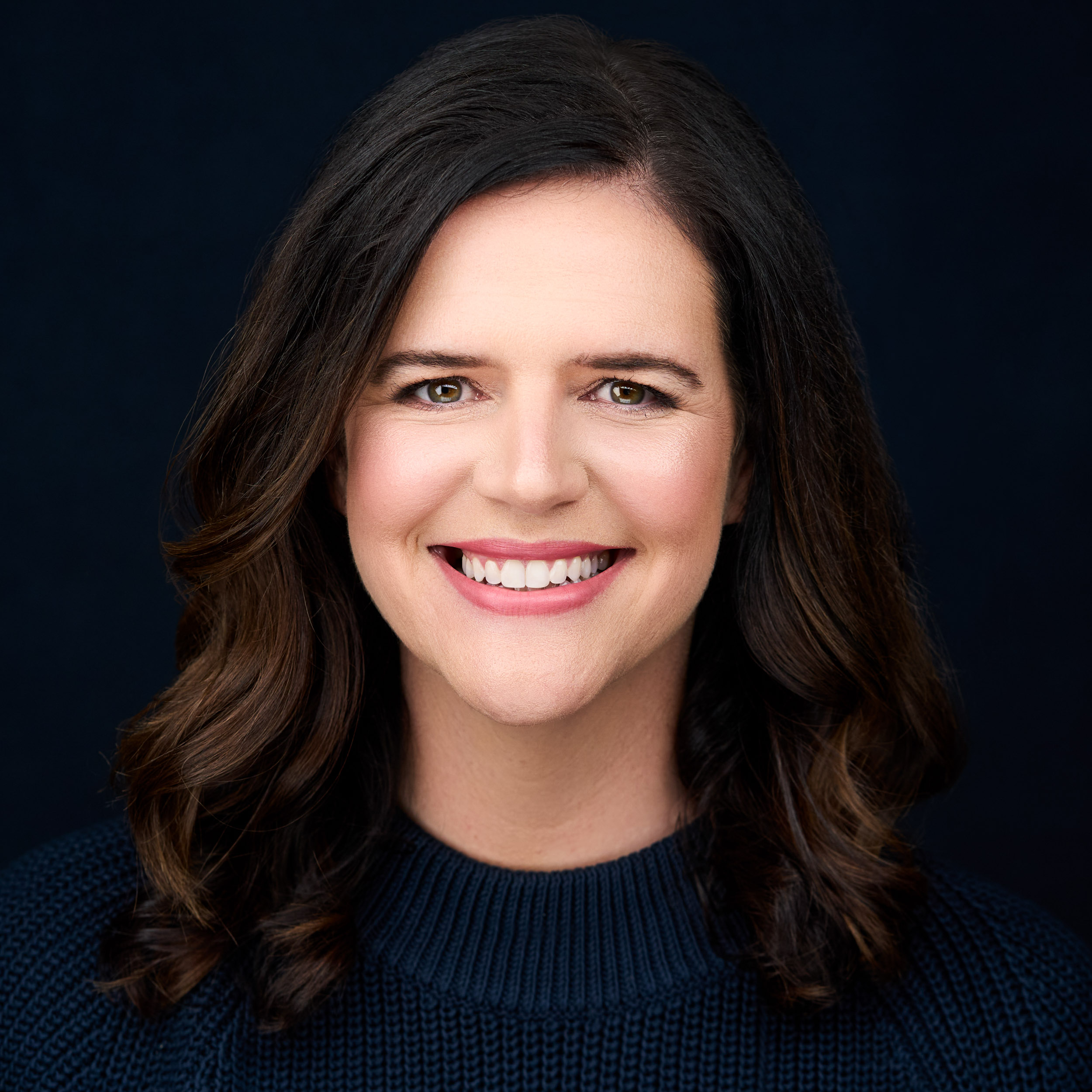
- A headshot of Lindsay Owens
- Occupations: Sociologist, Executive Director

Academic background
- Education: University of Pennsylvania (BA); Stanford University (MA)(PhD)

Academic work
- Discipline: Sociology; Economic policy Economic sociology Political science

Lindsay Alexandra Owens is an American economic sociologist who serves as the executive director of the Groundwork Collaborative, a Washington, D.C.–based non-profit public policy think tank. Owens is best known for her academic research on economic recessions in the United States, and her outspoken public commentary on the role that corporate profiteering plays in causing inflation. She previously served as a fellow at the liberal think tank the Roosevelt Institute.

In April 2023, Owens was named to Washingtonian magazine's "Most Influential People Shaping Policy" list, which noted that "Owens is known in media circles for her skills in communicating ways to better understand inflation and corporate profiteering."

== Education ==
Owens holds a Ph.D. and a master's degree in sociology from Stanford University and a bachelor's degree from the University of Pennsylvania. As a doctoral student at Stanford, Owens was a National Poverty Fellow at the Center on Poverty and Inequality and a National Science Foundation Graduate Research Fellow. Her doctoral research into public attitudes of Wall Street banks found that "animosity toward the financial sector reached its highest level in 40 years in 2010." In 2013, Owens received the Robert Dentler Award from the American Sociological Association's Section on Public Sociology and Sociological Practice as the co-editor of a chart book on poverty and economic inequality in the United States.

== Writings and commentary ==
Owens has written extensively on recessions, housing, polling, and economic inequality. Her academic research has been published in Brookings Papers on Economic Activity, The Annals of the American Academy of Political and Social Science, Public Opinion Quarterly, and Social Forces. Owens is a contributing author to The Great Recession, edited by David Grusky, Bruce Western, and Christopher Wimer.

Owens' economic commentary on Wall Street, inflation, and corporate profiteering has appeared in national publications including The Washington Post, The New York Times and The Boston Globe. She has appeared frequently as a featured on-air guest on live news programs and podcasts, including MSNBC, NPR, the PBS NewsHour, and Crooked Media's Pod Save America. Owens has appeared multiple times as a featured guest and panelist on The Problem with Jon Stewart to discuss inflation and corporate profiteering.

Owens' book Gouged: The End of a Fair Price – and What That Means for Your Wallet (ISBN 9798217058792) was released in 2026.

== Government service ==
Owens served as a senior economic policy advisor to Senator Elizabeth Warren and deputy chief of staff and legislative director to former Representative Keith Ellison and Congressional Progressive Caucus Chair Pramila Jayapal, where, as the Business Insider notes, Owens "was instrumental in crafting and passing legislation to expand the social safety net, increase power for workers, and build a more inclusive economy for all." In her memoir, Congresswoman Jayapal credits Owens for helping craft Medicare for All legislation in the U.S. House.

== Activities ==
During her tenure at Groundwork Collaborative, Owens has spoken out about the link between price hikes and corporate profiteering, and has encouraged the White House and Congress to take a tougher position on monopoly power. In April 2022, she testified before the Senate Budget Committee at a hearing titled, "Corporate Profits are Soaring as Prices Rise: Are Corporate Greed and Profiteering Fueling Inflation?" where she spoke about the role of corporate profiteering in rising prices.

During the 2021–2023 inflation surge in the United States, Owens was critical of the Federal Reserve's approach to lowering rising prices with interest rate hikes, claiming economic inequality will worsen during a possible recession that follows. She asserted that profiteering by corporations is a cause of inflation, and urged policymakers to institute a tax on excess profits as a solution. Other liberal economists have dismissed this argument, including current U.S. Treasury Secretary Janet Yellen who points mainly to supply and demand as the leading cause of inflation, and economist Jason Furman, former chair of the Council of Economic Advisers under President Barack Obama, who called it a "distraction" and a "bad theory of inflation." In an interview with The New York Times, Owens clarified that profiteering "is an accelerant of price increases...It is not the primary cause," pointing to earnings call research from her organization.

During the 2023 United States debt-ceiling crisis, Owens urged President Joe Biden's administration to "not give into hostage-taking," referring to negotiations between the White House and Congressional Republicans, where she called for more tax increases instead of spending cuts. Owens also called on the Biden administration to invoke the Fourteenth Amendment as a strategy to avoid default. After negotiators from the White House and House Republican leadership struck a deal to raise the debt ceiling and cap discretionary spending, Owens criticized the compromise saying it "represents the worst of conservative budget ideology," citing the effects flat spending may have on programs like Head Start and rental assistance.
