= Groundwork Collaborative =

American economic policy non-profit organization

- Abbreviation: GWC
- Formation: 2018; 8 years ago
- Founder: Michael Linden
- Type: Public policy think tank
- Location: Washington, DC
- Executive Director: Lindsay Owens
- Website: Official

Groundwork Collaborative (GWC) is an American 501(c)(3) non-profit think tank and progressive advocacy group based in Washington, D.C., that, according to its website, works to "change economic policy and narratives to build public power, curb private power, and create an economy that works for all of us." The organization is best known for research, analysis, and media commentary on economic issues, such as inflation, student debt, housing, and the U.S. labor market.

Groundwork has been described as a "left-leaning think tank" and a "nonprofit that is critical of corporate behavior" by the Washington Post, and a "progressive economic policy group" in the New York Times.

== History ==
Groundwork is led by Lindsay Owens, an economic sociologist who served as a senior economic policy advisor to Senator Elizabeth Warren and deputy chief of staff and legislative director to former Representative Keith Ellison and Progressive Caucus Chair Pramila Jayapal. She was recently named to the Washingtonian's "Most Influential People Shaping Policy" list, noting that "Owens is known in media circles for her skills in communicating ways to better understand inflation and corporate profiteering." The organization was founded in 2018 by Michael Linden. Linden also served as the executive associate director at the Office of Management and Budget from May 2022 - June 2023.

In January 2021, Lindsay Owens became interim executive director and was named the organization's executive director in June 2021.

Previous notable Groundwork employees include Janelle Jones, former chief economist at the Department of Labor, and Angela Hanks, former acting assistant secretary for Employment and Training Administration at the Department of Labor.

== Activities ==
=== Corporate profiteering ===
Groundwork offers research on "corporate profiteering" which the organization claims is a contributor to inflation sometimes called "greedflation". The organization maintains a database that tracks corporate earnings calls which news reports say "has described the CEOs as not just price gouging, but also 'bragging' about their ability to raise prices faster than costs." The organization has referenced companies including Chevron, H.B. Fuller, 3M and Colgate-Palmolive in the media, alleging its CEOs are "using the cover of inflation to jack up prices on consumers." In November 2022, Groundwork and the progressive consumer rights advocacy group Public Citizen released a report that found that large corporations opposed to anti-price gouging legislation spent $751 million on federal lobbying since 2020, nine times more than what was spent by supporters of the legislation.

In early 2022, Janet Yellen, Larry Summers, and Jason Furman criticized this approach of focusing on price gouging to combat inflation.

The organization released a report in January 2024 arguing that it had "resounding evidence" that high corporate profits were responsible for 53% of inflation in the United States during the second and third quarters of 2023. Economist Isabella Weber called this phenomenon where firms do not lower prices for consumers after input prices fall a form of implicit collusion, allowing companies to reap windfall profits. This followed a similar December 2023 paper published by the UK-based Institute for Public Policy Research and Common Wealth think tanks that stated that corporate profiteering played an important role in the inflation spike of 2022. Corporate profits surged while wages failed to keep pace with rising prices, resulting in the working class suffering the largest decline in disposable and discretionary income since World War II.

The organization also reported in February 2024, that 30% of the rise in grocery prices in particularly vulnerable sectors like beef, chicken, fruits, vegetables and snacks and urged the Biden administration to finalize rules to address the concentration in the meatpacking industry.

=== Monetary and fiscal policy ===
In 2022, Owens penned a New York Times op-ed where she criticized the hiking interest rates of interest rates to slow the economy, calling them a "a blunt policy tool with a high likelihood of throwing the country into a recession" and made a case that profiteering by corporations is a leading cause of inflation. She has also appeared multiple times on The Problem with Jon Stewart as a featured guest and panelist to discuss why Groundwork believes the Federal Reserve's policies are misguided and how corporate profiteering is driving inflation. Likewise, Mabud has been publicly critical of the Federal Reserve, arguing its actions will cause job losses and an economic recession while not addressing price gouging by corporations.

=== Debt ceiling ===
During the 2023 United States debt-ceiling crisis, Owens urged President Biden to "not give into hostage-taking," called for more tax increases and for Biden to invoke the Fourteenth Amendment as a strategy to avoid default. After negotiators struck a deal to raise the debt ceiling and cap discretionary spending, Owens criticized the compromise saying it "represents the worst of conservative budget ideology," citing the effects flat spending may have on programs like Head Start and rental assistance.

=== Fighting Chance for Families ===
In June 2021, Groundwork and liberal polling firm Data for Progress launched a 'war room' called Fighting Chance for Families to advocate for extending the temporary expanded child tax credit that was included in the American Rescue Plan Act of 2021. In July 2021, the group released a poll from Data for Progress and Mayors for a Guaranteed Income that found a majority of voters supported making the expanded child tax credit permanent, which contradicted polling by Morning Consult and Politico that found the opposite. Reports of the group's survey data suggested that President Joe Biden's approval ratings increased 4 percentage points among parents who received monthly checks. The program expired at the end of 2021.

=== EconCon ===
Along with other liberal organizations including the Economic Policy Institute, Demos, Center for Economic and Policy Research, and the Roosevelt Institute, Groundwork hosts EconCon, a yearly economic policy convention for left-leaning economists, advocates and policymakers. Recent keynote speakers have included Office of Management and Budget director Shalanda Young, Rep. Delia Ramirez, and Minnesota lieutenant governor Peggy Flanagan.

In 2022, Senator Elizabeth Warren delivered a keynote speech at the convention calling on Congress to eliminate the debt ceiling during the lame duck session of the 117th United States Congress and criticized the Federal Reserve's policies on inflation.

=== ProsperUS ===
In 2021, Groundwork Collaborative formed ProsperUS, a coalition of more than 70 progressive organizations pushing the Biden administration and Congress for increased public investment in the economy. The group supported the Build Back Better Plan and later, the Inflation Reduction Act.

During the September 2023 government shutdown crisis, the coalition called on leaders in Congress to reject spending cuts proposed by Congressional Republicans to keep the government funded and avoid shutdown.

=== Congressional testimony ===
During the 117th United States Congress, members of Groundwork's staff testified before various congressional committees on the topics of corporate profiteering, supply chain bottlenecks, inflation, workers' rights, and corporate consolidation. Owens testified before the Senate Budget Committee regarding the links between corporate profiteering and inflation. Dr. Rakeen Mabud, Groundwork's chief economist, testified before the House Antitrust Subcommittee, the House Consumer Protection Subcommittee, the House Financial Services Committee, and the House Oversight Committee regarding inflation, profiteering and supply chain bottlenecks. Mike Mitchell, Groundwork's former director of policy and research, testified before the House Fair Growth Committee regarding corporate consolidation and the imbalance of power between workers and companies.
