= List of counties by U.S. state and territory =

An enlargeable map of the counties and county equivalents located in the 50 U.S. states and Washington, D.C. as of 2020. Connecticut's nine councils of government and the 100 county equivalents in the U.S. territories are not on this map.

The following is a list of the counties and county-equivalents in the 50 states and District of Columbia sorted by U.S. state, plus the additional 100 county-equivalents in the U.S. territories sorted by territory.

Contents
- Alabama
- Alaska
- American Samoa
- Arizona
- Arkansas
- California
- Colorado
- Connecticut
- Delaware
- District of Columbia
- Florida
- Georgia
- Guam
- Hawaii
- Idaho
- Illinois
- Indiana
- Iowa
- Kansas
- Kentucky
- Louisiana
- Maine
- Maryland
- Massachusetts
- Michigan
- Minnesota
- Mississippi
- Missouri
- Montana
- Nebraska
- Nevada
- New Hampshire
- New Jersey
- New Mexico
- New York
- North Carolina
- North Dakota
- Northern Mariana Islands
- Ohio
- Oklahoma
- Oregon
- Pennsylvania
- Puerto Rico
- Rhode Island
- South Carolina
- South Dakota
- Tennessee
- Texas
- U.S. Minor Outlying Islands
- Utah
- Vermont
- Virgin Islands (USA)
- Virginia
- Washington
- West Virginia
- Wisconsin
- Wyoming
- Also
- References
- External links

== Alabama ==
The State of Alabama comprises 67 counties.

1. Autauga
2. Baldwin
3. Barbour
4. Bibb
5. Blount
6. Bullock
7. Butler
8. Calhoun
9. Chambers
10. Cherokee
11. Chilton
12. Choctaw
13. Clarke
14. Clay
15. Cleburne
16. Coffee
17. Colbert
18. Conecuh
19. Coosa
20. Covington
21. Crenshaw
22. Cullman
23. Dale
24. Dallas
25. DeKalb
26. Elmore
27. Escambia
28. Etowah
29. Fayette
30. Franklin
31. Geneva
32. Greene
33. Hale
34. Henry
35. Houston
36. Jackson
37. Jefferson
38. Lamar
39. Lauderdale
40. Lawrence
41. Lee
42. Limestone
43. Lowndes
44. Macon
45. Madison
46. Marengo
47. Marion
48. Marshall
49. Mobile
50. Monroe
51. Montgomery
52. Morgan
53. Perry
54. Pickens
55. Pike
56. Randolph
57. Russell
58. St. Clair
59. Shelby
60. Sumter
61. Talladega
62. Tallapoosa
63. Tuscaloosa
64. Walker
65. Washington
66. Wilcox
67. Winston

== Alaska ==
The State of Alaska comprises 19 organized boroughs and 1 unorganized borough, the latter divided into 11 unorganized census areas. (Note: The 19 boroughs and 10 census areas of the State of Alaska are county-equivalents.)

1. Aleutians East Borough
2. Anchorage Borough
3. Bristol Bay Borough
4. Denali Borough
5. Fairbanks North Star Borough
6. Haines Borough (Note: The Borough of Haines, Alaska has a consolidated city-borough government.)
7. Juneau
8. Kenai Peninsula Borough
9. Ketchikan Gateway Borough
10. Kodiak Island Borough
11. Lake and Peninsula Borough
12. Matanuska-Susitna Borough
13. North Slope Borough
14. Northwest Arctic
15. Petersburg Borough
16. Sitka Borough
17. Skagway Borough
18. Unorganized Borough
19. Wrangell Borough
20. Yakutat Borough
  1. Aleutians West Census Area
  2. Bethel Census Area
  3. Chugach Census Area
  4. Copper River Census Area
  5. Dillingham Census Area
  6. Hoonah-Angoon Census Area
  7. Kusilvak Census Area
  8. Nome Census Area
  9. Prince of Wales-Hyder Census Area
  10. Southeast Fairbanks Census Area
  11. Yukon-Koyukuk Census Area

== American Samoa ==
The Territory of American Samoa has 14 counties; however, these counties are not counted by the U.S. Census Bureau (they are treated as minor civil divisions). The U.S. Census Bureau counts the 3 districts and 2 atolls of American Samoa as county-equivalents.

1. Eastern District
2. Manu'a District
3. Rose Atoll
4. Swains Island
5. Western District

== Arizona ==
The State of Arizona comprises 15 counties.

1. Apache
2. Cochise
3. Coconino
4. Gila
5. Graham
6. Greenlee
7. La Paz
8. Maricopa
9. Mohave
10. Navajo
11. Pima
12. Pinal
13. Santa Cruz
14. Yavapai
15. Yuma

== Arkansas ==
The State of Arkansas comprises 75 counties.

1. Arkansas
2. Ashley
3. Baxter
4. Benton
5. Boone
6. Bradley
7. Calhoun
8. Carroll
9. Chicot
10. Clark
11. Clay
12. Cleburne
13. Cleveland
14. Columbia
15. Conway
16. Craighead
17. Crawford
18. Crittenden
19. Cross
20. Dallas
21. Desha
22. Drew
23. Faulkner
24. Franklin
25. Fulton
26. Garland
27. Grant
28. Greene
29. Hempstead
30. Hot Spring
31. Howard
32. Independence
33. Izard
34. Jackson
35. Jefferson
36. Johnson
37. Lafayette
38. Lawrence
39. Lee
40. Lincoln
41. Little River
42. Logan
43. Lonoke
44. Madison
45. Marion
46. Miller
47. Mississippi
48. Monroe
49. Montgomery
50. Nevada
51. Newton
52. Ouachita
53. Perry
54. Phillips
55. Pike
56. Poinsett
57. Polk
58. Pope
59. Prairie
60. Pulaski
61. Randolph
62. St. Francis
63. Saline
64. Scott
65. Searcy
66. Sebastian
67. Sevier
68. Sharp
69. Stone
70. Union
71. Van Buren
72. Washington
73. White
74. Woodruff
75. Yell

== California ==
The State of California comprises 58 counties, including one consolidated city-county government.

1. Alameda
2. Alpine
3. Amador
4. Butte
5. Calaveras
6. Colusa
7. Contra Costa
8. Del Norte
9. El Dorado
10. Fresno
11. Glenn
12. Humboldt
13. Imperial
14. Inyo
15. Kern
16. Kings
17. Lake
18. Lassen
19. Los Angeles (Note: Los Angeles is the most populous county in the United States.)
20. Madera
21. Marin
22. Mariposa
23. Mendocino
24. Merced
25. Modoc
26. Mono
27. Monterey
28. Napa
29. Nevada
30. Orange
31. Placer
32. Plumas
33. Riverside
34. Sacramento
35. San Benito
36. San Bernardino
37. San Diego
38. San Francisco
39. San Joaquin
40. San Luis Obispo
41. San Mateo
42. Santa Barbara
43. Santa Clara
44. Santa Cruz
45. Shasta
46. Sierra
47. Siskiyou
48. Solano
49. Sonoma
50. Stanislaus
51. Sutter
52. Tehama
53. Trinity
54. Tulare
55. Tuolumne
56. Ventura
57. Yolo
58. Yuba

== Colorado ==
The State of Colorado comprises 64 counties, including two consolidated city-county governments.

1. Adams
2. Alamosa
3. Arapahoe
4. Archuleta
5. Baca
6. Bent
7. Boulder
8. Broomfield
9. Chaffee
10. Cheyenne
11. Clear Creek
12. Conejos
13. Costilla
14. Crowley
15. Custer
16. Delta
17. Denver
18. Dolores
19. Douglas
20. Eagle
21. Elbert
22. El Paso
23. Fremont
24. Garfield
25. Gilpin
26. Grand
27. Gunnison
28. Hinsdale
29. Huerfano
30. Jackson
31. Jefferson
32. Kiowa
33. Kit Carson
34. Lake
35. La Plata
36. Larimer
37. Las Animas
38. Lincoln
39. Logan
40. Mesa
41. Mineral
42. Moffat
43. Montezuma
44. Montrose
45. Morgan
46. Otero
47. Ouray
48. Park
49. Phillips
50. Pitkin
51. Prowers
52. Pueblo
53. Rio Blanco
54. Rio Grande
55. Routt
56. Saguache
57. San Juan
58. San Miguel
59. Sedgwick
60. Summit
61. Teller
62. Washington
63. Weld
64. Yuma

== Connecticut ==
In the State of Connecticut, the U.S. Census Bureau began to formally recognize the state's 9 councils of government as county-equivalents on June 6, 2022, instead of Connecticut's eight historical counties. The eight historical counties continue to exist in name only, and are no longer considered for statistical purposes. Nonetheless, Connecticut has the fourth fewest number of subdivisions out of any state.

Councils of government

1. Capitol
2. Greater Bridgeport
3. Lower Connecticut River Valley
4. Naugatuck Valley
5. Northeastern Connecticut
6. Northwest Hills
7. South Central Connecticut
8. Southeastern Connecticut
9. Western Connecticut

Historical counties

1. Fairfield
2. Hartford
3. Litchfield
4. Middlesex
5. New Haven
6. New London
7. Tolland
8. Windham

== Delaware ==
The State of Delaware comprises 3 counties, the least of any state.

1. Kent
2. New Castle
3. Sussex

== District of Columbia ==
The United States Census Bureau and the Office of Management and Budget currently consider the District of Columbia to be a county-equivalent.

1. District of Columbia

== Florida ==
The State of Florida comprises 67 counties.

1. Alachua
2. Baker
3. Bay
4. Bradford
5. Brevard
6. Broward
7. Calhoun
8. Charlotte
9. Citrus
10. Clay
11. Collier
12. Columbia
13. DeSoto
14. Dixie
15. Duval (Note: The City of Jacksonville and the unincorporated portions of Duval County have a consolidated city-county government.)
16. Escambia
17. Flagler
18. Franklin
19. Gadsden
20. Gilchrist
21. Glades
22. Gulf
23. Hamilton
24. Hardee
25. Hendry
26. Hernando
27. Highlands
28. Hillsborough
29. Holmes
30. Indian River
31. Jackson
32. Jefferson
33. Lafayette
34. Lake
35. Lee
36. Leon
37. Levy
38. Liberty
39. Madison
40. Manatee
41. Marion
42. Martin
43. Miami-Dade
44. Monroe
45. Nassau
46. Okaloosa
47. Okeechobee
48. Orange
49. Osceola
50. Palm Beach
51. Pasco
52. Pinellas
53. Polk
54. Putnam
55. St. Johns
56. St. Lucie
57. Santa Rosa
58. Sarasota
59. Seminole
60. Sumter
61. Suwannee
62. Taylor
63. Union
64. Volusia
65. Wakulla
66. Walton
67. Washington

== Georgia ==
The State of Georgia comprises 159 counties, the second most of any state.

1. Appling
2. Atkinson
3. Bacon
4. Baker
5. Baldwin
6. Banks
7. Barrow
8. Bartow
9. Ben Hill
10. Berrien
11. Bibb (Note: The City of Macon and the unincorporated portions of Bibb County have a consolidated city-county government.)
12. Bleckley
13. Brantley
14. Brooks
15. Bryan
16. Bulloch
17. Burke
18. Butts
19. Calhoun
20. Camden
21. Candler
22. Carroll
23. Catoosa
24. Charlton
25. Chatham
26. Chattahoochee (Note: The City of Cusseta and the unincorporated portions of Chattahoochee County have a consolidated city-county government.)
27. Chattooga
28. Cherokee
29. Clarke (Note: The City of Athens and the unincorporated portions of Clarke County have a consolidated city-county government.)
30. Clay
31. Clayton
32. Clinch
33. Cobb
34. Coffee
35. Colquitt
36. Columbia
37. Cook
38. Coweta
39. Crawford
40. Crisp
41. Dade
42. Dawson
43. Decatur
44. DeKalb
45. Dodge
46. Dooly
47. Dougherty
48. Douglas
49. Early
50. Echols (Note: The City of Statenville and the unincorporated portions of Echols County have a consolidated city-county government.)
51. Effingham
52. Elbert
53. Emanuel
54. Evans
55. Fannin
56. Fayette
57. Floyd
58. Forsyth
59. Franklin
60. Fulton
61. Gilmer
62. Glascock
63. Glynn
64. Gordon
65. Grady
66. Greene
67. Gwinnett
68. Habersham
69. Hall
70. Hancock
71. Haralson
72. Harris
73. Hart
74. Heard
75. Henry
76. Houston
77. Irwin
78. Jackson
79. Jasper
80. Jeff Davis
81. Jefferson
82. Jenkins
83. Johnson
84. Jones
85. Lamar
86. Lanier
87. Laurens
88. Lee
89. Liberty
90. Lincoln
91. Long
92. Lowndes
93. Lumpkin
94. Macon
95. Madison
96. Marion
97. McDuffie
98. McIntosh
99. Meriwether
100. Miller
101. Mitchell
102. Monroe
103. Montgomery
104. Morgan
105. Murray
106. Muscogee (Note: The City of Columbus and the unincorporated portions of Muscogee County have a consolidated city-county government.)
107. Newton
108. Oconee
109. Oglethorpe
110. Paulding
111. Peach
112. Pickens
113. Pierce
114. Pike
115. Polk
116. Pulaski
117. Putnan
118. Quitman (Note: The City of Georgetown and the unincorporated portions of Quitman County have a consolidated city-county government.)
119. Rabun
120. Randolph
121. Richmond (Note: The City of Augusta and the unincorporated portions of Richmond County have a consolidated city-county government.)
122. Rockdale
123. Schley
124. Screven
125. Seminole
126. Spalding
127. Stephens
128. Stewart
129. Sumter
130. Talbot
131. Taliaferro
132. Tattnall
133. Taylor
134. Telfair
135. Terrell
136. Thomas
137. Tift
138. Toombs
139. Towns
140. Treutlen
141. Troup
142. Turner
143. Twiggs
144. Union
145. Upson
146. Walker
147. Walton
148. Ware
149. Warren
150. Washington
151. Wayne
152. Webster (Note: The City of Preston and the unincorporated portions of Webster County have a consolidated city-county government.)
153. Wheeler
154. White
155. Whitfield
156. Wilcox
157. Wilkes
158. Wilkinson
159. Worth

== Guam ==
The Territory of Guam has no counties. The U.S. Census Bureau counts all of Guam as one county-equivalent.

1. Guam

== Hawaii ==
The State of Hawaii comprises 5 counties.

1. Hawaiʻi
2. Honolulu
3. Kalawao
4. Kauaʻi
5. Maui

== Idaho ==
The State of Idaho comprises 44 counties.

1. Ada
2. Adams
3. Bannock
4. Bear Lake
5. Benewah
6. Bingham
7. Blaine
8. Boise
9. Bonner
10. Bonneville
11. Boundary
12. Butte
13. Camas
14. Canyon
15. Caribou
16. Cassia
17. Clark
18. Clearwater
19. Custer
20. Elmore
21. Franklin
22. Fremont
23. Gem
24. Gooding
25. Idaho
26. Jefferson
27. Jerome
28. Kootenai
29. Latah
30. Lemhi
31. Lewis
32. Lincoln
33. Madison
34. Minidoka
35. Nez Perce
36. Oneida
37. Owyhee
38. Payette
39. Power
40. Shoshone
41. Teton
42. Twin Falls
43. Valley
44. Washington

== Illinois ==
The State of Illinois comprises 102 counties.

1. Adams
2. Alexander
3. Bond
4. Boone
5. Brown
6. Bureau
7. Calhoun
8. Carroll
9. Cass
10. Champaign
11. Christian
12. Clark
13. Clay
14. Clinton
15. Coles
16. Cook
17. Crawford
18. Cumberland
19. DeKalb
20. DeWitt
21. Douglas
22. DuPage
23. Edgar
24. Edwards
25. Effingham
26. Fayette
27. Ford
28. Franklin
29. Fulton
30. Gallatin
31. Greene
32. Grundy
33. Hamilton
34. Hancock
35. Hardin
36. Henderson
37. Henry
38. Iroquois
39. Jackson
40. Jasper
41. Jefferson
42. Jersey
43. Jo Daviess
44. Johnson
45. Kane
46. Kankakee
47. Kendall
48. Knox
49. Lake
50. LaSalle
51. Lawrence
52. Lee
53. Livingston
54. Logan
55. Macon
56. Macoupin
57. Madison
58. Marion
59. Marshall
60. Mason
61. Massac
62. McDonough
63. McHenry
64. McLean
65. Menard
66. Mercer
67. Monroe
68. Montgomery
69. Morgan
70. Moultrie
71. Ogle
72. Peoria
73. Perry
74. Piatt
75. Pike
76. Pope
77. Pulaski
78. Putnam
79. Randolph
80. Richland
81. Rock Island
82. St. Clair
83. Saline
84. Sangamon
85. Schuyler
86. Scott
87. Shelby
88. Stark
89. Stephenson
90. Tazewell
91. Union
92. Vermilion
93. Wabash
94. Warren
95. Washington
96. Wayne
97. White
98. Whiteside
99. Will
100. Williamson
101. Winnebago
102. Woodford

== Indiana ==
The State of Indiana comprises 92 counties.

1. Adams
2. Allen
3. Bartholomew
4. Benton
5. Blackford
6. Boone
7. Brown
8. Carroll
9. Cass
10. Clark
11. Clay
12. Clinton
13. Crawford
14. Daviess
15. Dearborn
16. Decatur
17. DeKalb
18. Delaware
19. Dubois
20. Elkhart
21. Fayette
22. Floyd
23. Fountain
24. Franklin
25. Fulton
26. Gibson
27. Grant
28. Greene
29. Hamilton
30. Hancock
31. Harrison
32. Hendricks
33. Henry
34. Howard
35. Huntington
36. Jackson
37. Jasper
38. Jay
39. Jefferson
40. Jennings
41. Johnson
42. Knox
43. Kosciusko
44. LaGrange
45. Lake
46. LaPorte
47. Lawrence
48. Madison
49. Marion (Note: The City of Indianapolis and the unincorporated portions of Marion County have a consolidated city-county government.)
50. Marshall
51. Martin
52. Miami
53. Monroe
54. Montgomery
55. Morgan
56. Newton
57. Noble
58. Ohio
59. Orange
60. Owen
61. Parke
62. Perry
63. Pike
64. Porter
65. Posey
66. Pulaski
67. Putnam
68. Randolph
69. Ripley
70. Rush
71. St. Joseph
72. Scott
73. Shelby
74. Spencer
75. Starke
76. Steuben
77. Sullivan
78. Switzerland
79. Tippecanoe
80. Tipton
81. Union
82. Vanderburgh
83. Vermillion
84. Vigo
85. Wabash
86. Warren
87. Warrick
88. Washington
89. Wayne
90. Wells
91. White
92. Whitley

== Iowa ==
The State of Iowa comprises 99 counties.

1. Adair
2. Adams
3. Allamakee
4. Appanoose
5. Audubon
6. Benton
7. Black Hawk
8. Boone
9. Bremer
10. Buchanan
11. Buena Vista
12. Butler
13. Calhoun
14. Carroll
15. Cass
16. Cedar
17. Cerro Gordo
18. Cherokee
19. Chickasaw
20. Clarke
21. Clay
22. Clayton
23. Clinton
24. Crawford
25. Dallas
26. Davis
27. Decatur
28. Delaware
29. Des Moines
30. Dickinson
31. Dubuque
32. Emmet
33. Fayette
34. Floyd
35. Franklin
36. Fremont
37. Greene
38. Grundy
39. Guthrie
40. Hamilton
41. Hancock
42. Hardin
43. Harrison
44. Henry
45. Howard
46. Humboldt
47. Ida
48. Iowa
49. Jackson
50. Jasper
51. Jefferson
52. Johnson
53. Jones
54. Keokuk
55. Kossuth
56. Lee
57. Linn
58. Louisa
59. Lucas
60. Lyon
61. Madison
62. Mahaska
63. Marion
64. Marshall
65. Mills
66. Mitchell
67. Monona
68. Monroe
69. Montgomery
70. Muscatine
71. O'Brien
72. Osceola
73. Page
74. Palo Alto
75. Plymouth
76. Pocahontas
77. Polk
78. Pottawattamie
79. Poweshiek
80. Ringgold
81. Sac
82. Scott
83. Shelby
84. Sioux
85. Story
86. Tama
87. Taylor
88. Union
89. Van Buren
90. Wapello
91. Warren
92. Washington
93. Wayne
94. Webster
95. Winnebago
96. Winneshiek
97. Woodbury
98. Worth
99. Wright

== Kansas ==
The State of Kansas comprises 105 counties.

1. Allen
2. Anderson
3. Atchison
4. Barber
5. Barton
6. Bourbon
7. Brown
8. Butler
9. Chase
10. Chautauqua
11. Cherokee
12. Cheyenne
13. Clark
14. Clay
15. Cloud
16. Coffey
17. Comanche
18. Cowley
19. Crawford
20. Decatur
21. Dickinson
22. Doniphan
23. Douglas
24. Edwards
25. Elk
26. Ellis
27. Ellsworth
28. Finney
29. Ford
30. Franklin
31. Geary
32. Gove
33. Graham
34. Grant
35. Gray
36. Greeley
37. Greenwood
38. Hamilton
39. Harper
40. Harvey
41. Haskell
42. Hodgeman
43. Jackson
44. Jefferson
45. Jewell
46. Johnson
47. Kearny
48. Kingman
49. Kiowa
50. Labette
51. Lane
52. Leavenworth
53. Lincoln
54. Linn
55. Logan
56. Lyon
57. Marion
58. Marshall
59. McPherson
60. Meade
61. Miami
62. Mitchell
63. Montgomery
64. Morris
65. Morton
66. Nemaha
67. Neosho
68. Ness
69. Norton
70. Osage
71. Osborne
72. Ottawa
73. Pawnee
74. Phillips
75. Pottawatomie
76. Pratt
77. Rawlins
78. Reno
79. Republic
80. Rice
81. Riley
82. Rooks
83. Rush
84. Russell
85. Saline
86. Scott
87. Sedgwick
88. Seward
89. Shawnee
90. Sheridan
91. Sherman
92. Smith
93. Stafford
94. Stanton
95. Stevens
96. Sumner
97. Thomas
98. Trego
99. Wabunsee
100. Wallace
101. Washington
102. Wichita
103. Wilson
104. Woodson
105. Wyandotte

== Kentucky ==
The Commonwealth of Kentucky comprises 120 counties.

1. Adair
2. Allen
3. Anderson
4. Ballard
5. Barren
6. Bath
7. Bell
8. Boone
9. Bourbon
10. Boyd
11. Boyle
12. Bracken
13. Breathitt
14. Breckinridge
15. Bullitt
16. Butler
17. Caldwell
18. Calloway
19. Campbell
20. Carlisle
21. Carroll
22. Carter
23. Casey
24. Christian
25. Clark
26. Clay
27. Clinton
28. Crittenden
29. Cumberland
30. Daviess
31. Edmonson
32. Elliott
33. Estill
34. Fayette (Note: The City of Lexington and the unincorporated portions of Fayette County have a consolidated city-county government.)
35. Fleming
36. Floyd
37. Franklin
38. Fulton
39. Gallatin
40. Garrard
41. Grant
42. Graves
43. Grayson
44. Green
45. Greenup
46. Hancock
47. Hardin
48. Harlan
49. Harrison
50. Hart
51. Henderson
52. Henry
53. Hickman
54. Hopkins
55. Jackson
56. Jefferson (Note: The City of Louisville and the unincorporated portions of Jefferson County have a consolidated city-county government.)
57. Jessamine
58. Johnson
59. Kenton
60. Knott
61. Knox
62. LaRue
63. Laurel
64. Lawrence
65. Lee
66. Leslie
67. Letcher
68. Lewis
69. Lincoln
70. Livingston
71. Logan
72. Lyon
73. Madison
74. Magoffin
75. Marion
76. Marshall
77. Martin
78. Mason
79. McCracken
80. McCreary
81. McLean
82. Meade
83. Menifee
84. Mercer
85. Metcalfe
86. Monroe
87. Montgomery
88. Morgan
89. Muhlenburg
90. Nelson
91. Nicholas
92. Ohio
93. Oldham
94. Owen
95. Owsley
96. Pendleton
97. Perry
98. Pike
99. Powell
100. Pulaski
101. Robertson
102. Rockcastle
103. Rowan
104. Russell
105. Scott
106. Shelby
107. Simpson
108. Spencer
109. Taylor
110. Todd
111. Trigg
112. Trimble
113. Union
114. Warren
115. Washington
116. Wayne
117. Webster
118. Whitley
119. Wolfe
120. Woodford

== Louisiana ==
The State of Louisiana does not use counties, instead using parishes as a county-equivalent. The state comprises 64 parishes.

1. Acadia
2. Allen
3. Ascension
4. Assumption
5. Avoyelles
6. Beauregard
7. Bienville
8. Bossier
9. Caddo
10. Calcasieu
11. Caldwell
12. Cameron
13. Catahoula
14. Claiborne
15. Concordia
16. DeSoto
17. East Baton Rouge
18. East Carroll
19. East Feliciana
20. Evangeline
21. Franklin
22. Grant
23. Iberia
24. Iberville
25. Jackson
26. Jefferson
27. Jefferson Davis
28. Lafayette
29. Lafourche
30. LaSalle
31. Lincoln
32. Livingston
33. Madison
34. Morehouse
35. Natchitoches
36. Orleans
37. Ouachita
38. Plaquemines
39. Pointe Coupee
40. Rapides
41. Red River
42. Richland
43. Sabine
44. St. Bernard
45. St. Charles
46. St. Helena
47. St. James
48. St. John the Baptist
49. St. Landry
50. St. Martin
51. St. Mary
52. St. Tammany
53. Tangipahoa
54. Tensas
55. Terrebone (Note: The City of Houma and the unincorporated portions of Terrebone Parish have a consolidated city-parish government.)
56. Union
57. Vermilion
58. Vernon
59. Washington
60. Webster
61. West Baton Rouge
62. West Carroll
63. West Feliciana
64. Winn

== Maine ==
The State of Maine comprises 16 counties.

1. Androscoggin
2. Aroostook
3. Cumberland
4. Franklin
5. Hancock
6. Kennebec
7. Knox
8. Lincoln
9. Oxford
10. Penobscot
11. Piscataquis
12. Sagasahoc
13. Somerset
14. Waldo
15. Washington
16. York

== Maryland ==
The State of Maryland comprises 23 counties and 1 independent city.

1. Allegany
2. Anne Arundel
3. Baltimore
4. Baltimore City
5. Calvert
6. Caroline
7. Carroll
8. Cecil
9. Charles
10. Dorchester
11. Frederick
12. Garrett
13. Harford
14. Howard
15. Kent
16. Montgomery
17. Prince George’s
18. Queen Anne’s
19. St. Mary’s
20. Somerset
21. Talbot
22. Washington
23. Wicomico
24. Worcester

== Massachusetts ==
The Commonwealth of Massachusetts comprises 14 counties, including one consolidated city-county government.

1. Barnstable
2. Berkshire (Note: The Commonwealth of Massachusetts has abolished the government of Berkshire County.)
3. Bristol
4. Dukes
5. Essex (Note: The Commonwealth of Massachusetts has abolished the government of Essex County.)
6. Franklin (Note: The Commonwealth of Massachusetts has abolished the government of Franklin County.)
7. Hampden (Note: The Commonwealth of Massachusetts has abolished the government of Hampden County.)
8. Hampshire (Note: The Commonwealth of Massachusetts has abolished the government of Hampshire County.)
9. Middlesex (Note: The Commonwealth of Massachusetts has abolished the government of Middlesex County.)
10. Nantucket
11. Norfolk
12. Plymouth
13. Suffolk (Note: The Commonwealth of Massachusetts has abolished the government of Suffolk County.)
14. Worcester (Note: The Commonwealth of Massachusetts has abolished the government of Worcester County.)

== Michigan ==
The State of Michigan comprises 83 counties.

1. Alcona
2. Alger
3. Allegan
4. Alpena
5. Antrim
6. Arenac
7. Baraga
8. Barry
9. Bay
10. Benzie
11. Berrien
12. Branch
13. Calhoun
14. Cass
15. Charlevoix
16. Cheboygan
17. Chippewa
18. Clare
19. Clinton
20. Crawford
21. Delta
22. Dickinson
23. Eaton
24. Emmet
25. Genesee
26. Gladwin
27. Gogebic
28. Grand Traverse
29. Gratiot
30. Hillsdale
31. Houghton
32. Huron
33. Ingham
34. Ionia
35. Iosco
36. Iron
37. Isabella
38. Jackson
39. Kalamazoo
40. Kalkaska
41. Kent
42. Keweenaw
43. Lake
44. Lapeer
45. Leelanau
46. Lenawee
47. Livingston
48. Luce
49. Mackinac
50. Macomb
51. Manistee
52. Marquette
53. Mason
54. Mecosta
55. Menominee
56. Midland
57. Missaukee
58. Monroe
59. Montcalm
60. Montmorency
61. Muskegon
62. Newaygo
63. Oakland
64. Oceana
65. Ogemaw
66. Ontonagon
67. Osceola
68. Oscoda
69. Otsego
70. Ottawa
71. Presque Isle
72. Roscommon
73. Saginaw
74. St. Clair
75. St. Joseph
76. Sanilac
77. Schoolcraft
78. Shiawassee
79. Tuscola
80. Van Buren
81. Washtenaw
82. Wayne
83. Wexford

== Minnesota ==
The State of Minnesota comprises 87 counties.

1. Aitkin
2. Anoka
3. Becker
4. Beltrami
5. Benton
6. Big Stone
7. Blue Earth
8. Brown
9. Carlton
10. Carver
11. Cass
12. Chippewa
13. Chisago
14. Clay
15. Clearwater
16. Cook
17. Cottonwood
18. Crow Wing
19. Dakota
20. Dodge
21. Douglas
22. Faribault
23. Fillmore
24. Freeborn
25. Goodhue
26. Grant
27. Hennepin
28. Houston
29. Hubbard
30. Isanti
31. Itasca
32. Jackson
33. Kanabec
34. Kandiyohi
35. Kittson
36. Koochiching
37. Lac qui Parle
38. Lake
39. Lake of the Woods
40. Le Sueur
41. Lincoln
42. Lyon
43. Mahnomen
44. Marshall
45. Martin
46. McLeod
47. Meeker
48. Mille Lacs
49. Morrison
50. Mower
51. Murray
52. Nicollet
53. Nobles
54. Norman
55. Olmsted
56. Otter Tail
57. Pennington
58. Pine
59. Pipestone
60. Polk
61. Pope
62. Ramsey
63. Red Lake
64. Redwood
65. Renville
66. Rice
67. Rock
68. Roseau
69. St. Louis
70. Scott
71. Sherburne
72. Sibley
73. Stearns
74. Steele
75. Stevens
76. Swift
77. Todd
78. Traverse
79. Wabasha
80. Wadena
81. Waseca
82. Washington
83. Watonwan
84. Wilkin
85. Winona
86. Wright
87. Yellow Medicine

== Mississippi ==
The State of Mississippi comprises 82 counties.

1. Adams
2. Alcorn
3. Amite
4. Attala
5. Benton
6. Bolivar
7. Calhoun
8. Carroll
9. Chickasaw
10. Choctaw
11. Claiborne
12. Clarke
13. Clay
14. Coahoma
15. Copiah
16. Covington
17. DeSoto
18. Forrest
19. Franklin
20. George
21. Greene
22. Grenada
23. Hancock
24. Harrison
25. Hinds
26. Holmes
27. Humphreys
28. Issaquena
29. Itawamba
30. Jackson
31. Jasper
32. Jefferson
33. Jefferson Davis
34. Jones
35. Kemper
36. Lafayette
37. Lamar
38. Lauderdale
39. Lawrence
40. Leake
41. Lee
42. Leflore
43. Lincoln
44. Lowndes
45. Madison
46. Marion
47. Marshall
48. Monroe
49. Montgomery
50. Neshoba
51. Newton
52. Noxubee
53. Oktibbeha
54. Panola
55. Pearl River
56. Perry
57. Pike
58. Pontotoc
59. Prentiss
60. Quitman
61. Rankin
62. Scott
63. Sharkey
64. Simpson
65. Smith
66. Stone
67. Sunflower
68. Tallahatchie
69. Tate
70. Tippah
71. Tishomingo
72. Tunica
73. Union
74. Walthall
75. Warren
76. Washington
77. Wayne
78. Webster
79. Wilkinson
80. Winston
81. Yalobusha
82. Yazoo

== Missouri ==
The State of Missouri comprises 114 counties and 1 independent city.

1. Adair
2. Andrew
3. Atchison
4. Audrain
5. Barry
6. Barton
7. Bates
8. Benton
9. Bollinger
10. Boone
11. Buchanan
12. Butler
13. Caldwell
14. Callaway
15. Camden
16. Cape Girardeau
17. Carroll
18. Carter
19. Cass
20. Cedar
21. Chariton
22. Christian
23. Clark
24. Clay
25. Clinton
26. Cole
27. Cooper
28. Crawford
29. Dade
30. Dallas
31. Daviess
32. DeKalb
33. Dent
34. Douglas
35. Dunklin
36. Franklin
37. Gasconade
38. Gentry
39. Greene
40. Grundy
41. Harrison
42. Henry
43. Hickory
44. Holt
45. Howard
46. Howell
47. Iron
48. Jackson
49. Jasper
50. Jefferson
51. Johnson
52. Knox
53. Laclede
54. Lafayette
55. Lawrence
56. Lewis
57. Lincoln
58. Linn
59. Livingston
60. Macon
61. Madison
62. Maries
63. Marion
64. McDonald
65. Mercer
66. Miller
67. Mississippi
68. Moniteau
69. Monroe
70. Montgomery
71. Morgan
72. New Madrid
73. Newton
74. Nodaway
75. Oregon
76. Osage
77. Ozark
78. Pemiscot
79. Perry
80. Pettis
81. Phelps
82. Pike
83. Platte
84. Polk
85. Pulaski
86. Putnam
87. Ralls
88. Randolph
89. Ray
90. Reynolds
91. Ripley
92. St. Charles
93. St. Clair
94. St. Francis
95. St. Louis
96. St. Louis City
97. Ste. Genevieve
98. Saline
99. Schuyler
100. Scotland
101. Scott
102. Shannon
103. Shelby
104. Stoddard
105. Stone
106. Sullivan
107. Taney
108. Texas
109. Vernon
110. Warren
111. Washington
112. Wayne
113. Webster
114. Worth
115. Wright

== Montana ==
The State of Montana comprises 56 counties.

1. Beaverhead
2. Big Horn
3. Blaine
4. Broadwater
5. Carbon
6. Carter
7. Cascade
8. Chouteau
9. Custer
10. Daniels
11. Dawson
12. Deer Lodge (Note: The City of Anaconda and the unincorporated portions of Deer Lodge County have a consolidated city-county government.)
13. Fallon
14. Fergus
15. Flathead
16. Gallatin
17. Garfield
18. Glacier
19. Golden Valley
20. Granite
21. Hill
22. Jefferson
23. Judith Basin
24. Lake
25. Lewis and Clark
26. Liberty
27. Lincoln
28. Madison
29. McCone
30. Meagher
31. Mineral
32. Missoula
33. Musselshell
34. Park
35. Petroleum
36. Phillips
37. Pondera
38. Powder River
39. Powell
40. Prairie
41. Ravali
42. Richland
43. Roosevelt
44. Rosebud
45. Sanders
46. Sheridan
47. Silver Bow (Note: The City of Butte and the unincorporated portions of Silver Bow County have a consolidated city-county government.)
48. Stillwater
49. Sweet Grass
50. Teton
51. Toole
52. Treasure
53. Valley
54. Wheatland
55. Wibaux
56. Yellowstone

== Nebraska ==
The State of Nebraska comprises 93 counties.

1. Adams
2. Antelope
3. Arthur
4. Banner
5. Blaine
6. Boone
7. Box Butte
8. Boyd
9. Brown
10. Buffalo
11. Burt
12. Butler
13. Cass
14. Cedar
15. Chase
16. Cherry
17. Cheyenne
18. Clay
19. Colfax
20. Cuming
21. Custer
22. Dakota
23. Dawes
24. Dawson
25. Deuel
26. Dixon
27. Dodge
28. Douglas
29. Dundy
30. Fillmore
31. Franklin
32. Frontier
33. Furnas
34. Gage
35. Garden
36. Garfield
37. Gosper
38. Grant
39. Greeley
40. Hall
41. Hamilton
42. Harlan
43. Hayes
44. Hitchcock
45. Holt
46. Hooker
47. Howard
48. Jefferson
49. Johnson
50. Kearney
51. Keith
52. Keya Paha
53. Kimball
54. Knox
55. Lancaster
56. Lincoln
57. Logan
58. Loup
59. Madison
60. McPherson
61. Merrick
62. Morrill
63. Nance
64. Nehama
65. Nuckolls
66. Otoe
67. Pawnee
68. Perkins
69. Phelps
70. Pierce
71. Platte
72. Polk
73. Red Willow
74. Richardson
75. Rock
76. Saline
77. Sarpy
78. Saunders
79. Scotts Bluff
80. Seward
81. Sheridan
82. Sherman
83. Sioux
84. Stanton
85. Thayer
86. Thomas
87. Thurston
88. Valley
89. Washington
90. Wayne
91. Webster
92. Wheeler
93. York

== Nevada ==
The State of Nevada comprises 16 counties and 1 independent city.

1. Carson City
2. Churchill
3. Clark
4. Douglas
5. Elko
6. Esmeralda
7. Eureka
8. Humboldt
9. Lander
10. Lincoln
11. Lyon
12. Mineral
13. Nye
14. Pershing
15. Storey
16. Washoe
17. White Pine

== New Hampshire ==
The State of New Hampshire comprises 10 counties.

1. Belknap
2. Carroll
3. Cheshire
4. Coos
5. Grafton
6. Hillsborough
7. Merrimack
8. Rockingham
9. Strafford
10. Sullivan

== New Jersey ==
The State of New Jersey comprises 21 counties.

1. Atlantic
2. Bergen
3. Burlington
4. Camden
5. Cape May
6. Cumberland
7. Essex
8. Gloucester
9. Hudson
10. Hunterdon
11. Mercer
12. Middlesex
13. Monmouth
14. Morris
15. Ocean
16. Passaic
17. Salem
18. Somerset
19. Sussex
20. Union
21. Warren

== New Mexico ==
The State of New Mexico comprises 33 counties, including one consolidated city-county government.

1. Bernalillo
2. Catron
3. Chaves
4. Cibola
5. Colfax
6. Curry
7. De Baca
8. Doña Ana
9. Eddy
10. Grant
11. Guadalupe
12. Harding
13. Hidalgo
14. Lea
15. Lincoln
16. Los Alamos
17. Luna
18. McKinley
19. Mora
20. Otero
21. Quay
22. Rio Arriba
23. Roosevelt
24. Sandoval
25. San Juan
26. San Miguel
27. Santa Fe
28. Sierra
29. Socorro
30. Taos
31. Torrance
32. Union
33. Valencia

== New York ==
The State of New York comprises 62 counties.

1. Albany
2. Allegany
3. Bronx (Note: The Borough of the Bronx and Bronx County have a consolidated borough-county government.)
4. Broome
5. Cattaraugus
6. Cayuga
7. Chautauqua
8. Chemung
9. Chenago
10. Clinton
11. Columbia
12. Cortland
13. Delaware
14. Dutchess
15. Erie
16. Essex
17. Franklin
18. Fulton
19. Genesee
20. Greene
21. Hamilton
22. Herkimer
23. Jefferson
24. Kings (Note: The Borough of Brooklyn and Kings County have a consolidated borough-county government.)
25. Lewis
26. Livingston
27. Madison
28. Monroe
29. Montgomery
30. Nassau
31. New York (Note: The Borough of Manhattan and New York County have a consolidated borough-county government.)
32. Niagara
33. Oneida
34. Onondaga
35. Ontario
36. Orange
37. Orleans
38. Oswego
39. Otsego
40. Putnam
41. Queens (Note: The Borough of Queens and Queens County have a consolidated borough-county government.)
42. Rensselaer
43. Richmond (Note: The Borough of Staten Island and Richmond County have a consolidated borough-county government.)
44. Rockland
45. St. Lawrence
46. Saratoga
47. Schenectady
48. Schoharie
49. Schuyler
50. Seneca
51. Steuben
52. Suffolk
53. Sullivan
54. Tioga
55. Tompkins
56. Ulster
57. Warren
58. Washington
59. Wayne
60. Westchester
61. Wyoming
62. Yates

== North Carolina ==
The State of North Carolina comprises 100 counties, including one consolidated city-county (Camden).

1. Alamance
2. Alexander
3. Alleghany
4. Anson
5. Ashe
6. Avery
7. Beaufort
8. Bertie
9. Bladen
10. Brunswick
11. Buncombe
12. Burke
13. Cabarrus
14. Caldwell
15. Camden
16. Carteret
17. Caswell
18. Catawba
19. Chatham
20. Cherokee
21. Chowan
22. Clay
23. Cleveland
24. Columbus
25. Craven
26. Cumberland
27. Currituck
28. Dare
29. Davidson
30. Davie
31. Duplin
32. Durham
33. Edgecombe
34. Forsyth
35. Franklin
36. Gaston
37. Gates
38. Graham
39. Granville
40. Greene
41. Guilford
42. Halifax
43. Harnett
44. Haywood
45. Henderson
46. Hertford
47. Hoke
48. Hyde
49. Iredell
50. Jackson
51. Johnston
52. Jones
53. Lee
54. Lenoir
55. Lincoln
56. Macon
57. Madison
58. Martin
59. McDowell
60. Mecklenburg
61. Mitchell
62. Montgomery
63. Moore
64. Nash
65. New Hanover
66. Northampton
67. Onslow
68. Orange
69. Pamlico
70. Pasquotank
71. Pender
72. Perquimans
73. Person
74. Pitt
75. Polk
76. Randolph
77. Richmond
78. Robeson
79. Rockingham
80. Rowan
81. Rutherford
82. Sampson
83. Scotland
84. Stanly
85. Stokes
86. Surry
87. Swain
88. Transylvania
89. Tyrrell
90. Union
91. Vance
92. Wake
93. Warren
94. Washington
95. Watauga
96. Wayne
97. Wilkes
98. Wilson
99. Yadkin
100. Yancey

== North Dakota ==
The State of North Dakota comprises 53 counties.

1. Adams
2. Barnes
3. Benson
4. Billings
5. Bottineau
6. Bowman
7. Burke
8. Burleigh
9. Cass
10. Cavalier
11. Dickey
12. Divide
13. Dunn
14. Eddy
15. Emmons
16. Foster
17. Golden Valley
18. Grand Forks
19. Grant
20. Griggs
21. Hettinger
22. Kidder
23. LaMoure
24. Logan
25. McHenry
26. McIntosh
27. McKenzie
28. McLean
29. Mercer
30. Morton
31. Mountrail
32. Nelson
33. Oliver
34. Pembina
35. Pierce
36. Ramsey
37. Ransom
38. Renville
39. Richland
40. Rolette
41. Sargent
42. Sheridan
43. Sioux
44. Slope
45. Stark
46. Steele
47. Stutsman
48. Towner
49. Traill
50. Walsh
51. Ward
52. Wells
53. Williams

== Northern Mariana Islands ==
The Commonwealth of the Northern Mariana Islands has no counties. The U.S. Census Bureau counts the 4 municipalities of the Northern Mariana Islands as county-equivalents.

1. Northern Islands
2. Rota
3. Saipan
4. Tinian

== Ohio ==
The State of Ohio comprises 88 counties.

1. Adams
2. Allen
3. Ashland
4. Ashtabula
5. Athens
6. Auglaize
7. Belmont
8. Brown
9. Butler
10. Carroll
11. Champaign
12. Clark
13. Clermont
14. Clinton
15. Columbiana
16. Coshocton
17. Crawford
18. Cuyahoga
19. Darke
20. Defiance
21. Delaware
22. Erie
23. Fairfield
24. Fayette
25. Franklin
26. Fulton
27. Gallia
28. Geauga
29. Greene
30. Guernsey
31. Hamilton
32. Hancock
33. Hardin
34. Harrison
35. Henry
36. Highland
37. Hocking
38. Holmes
39. Huron
40. Jackson
41. Jefferson
42. Knox
43. Lake
44. Lawrence
45. Licking
46. Logan
47. Lorain
48. Lucas
49. Madison
50. Mahoning
51. Marion
52. Medina
53. Meigs
54. Mercer
55. Miami
56. Monroe
57. Montgomery
58. Morgan
59. Morrow
60. Muskingum
61. Noble
62. Ottawa
63. Paulding
64. Perry
65. Pickaway
66. Pike
67. Portage
68. Preble
69. Putnam
70. Richland
71. Ross
72. Sandusky
73. Scioto
74. Seneca
75. Shelby
76. Stark
77. Summit
78. Trumbull
79. Tuscarawas
80. Union
81. Van Wert
82. Vinton
83. Warren
84. Washington
85. Wayne
86. Williams
87. Wood
88. Wyandot

== Oklahoma ==
The State of Oklahoma comprises 77 counties.

1. Adair
2. Alfalfa
3. Atoka
4. Beaver
5. Beckham
6. Blaine
7. Bryan
8. Caddo
9. Canadian
10. Carter
11. Cherokee
12. Choctaw
13. Cimarron
14. Cleveland
15. Coal
16. Comanche
17. Cotton
18. Craig
19. Creek
20. Custer
21. Delaware
22. Dewey
23. Ellis
24. Garfield
25. Garvin
26. Grady
27. Grant
28. Greer
29. Harmon
30. Harper
31. Haskell
32. Hughes
33. Jackson
34. Jefferson
35. Johnston
36. Kay
37. Kingfisher
38. Kiowa
39. Latimer
40. LeFlore
41. Lincoln
42. Logan
43. Love
44. Major
45. Marshall
46. Mayes
47. McClain
48. McCurtain
49. McIntosh
50. Murray
51. Muskogee
52. Noble
53. Nowata
54. Okfuskee
55. Oklahoma
56. Okmulgee
57. Osage
58. Ottawa
59. Pawnee
60. Payne
61. Pittsburg
62. Pontotoc
63. Pottawatomie
64. Pushmataha
65. Roger Mills
66. Rogers
67. Seminole
68. Sequoyah
69. Stephens
70. Texas
71. Tillman
72. Tulsa
73. Wagoner
74. Washington
75. Washita
76. Woods
77. Woodward

== Oregon ==
The State of Oregon comprises 36 counties.

1. Baker
2. Benton
3. Clackamas
4. Clatsop
5. Columbia
6. Coos
7. Crook
8. Curry
9. Deschutes
10. Douglas
11. Gilliam
12. Grant
13. Harney
14. Hood River
15. Jackson
16. Jefferson
17. Josephine
18. Klamath
19. Lake
20. Lane
21. Lincoln
22. Linn
23. Malheur
24. Marion
25. Morrow
26. Multnomah
27. Polk
28. Sherman
29. Tillamook
30. Umatilla
31. Union
32. Wallowa
33. Wasco
34. Washington
35. Wheeler
36. Yamhill

== Pennsylvania ==
The Commonwealth of Pennsylvania comprises 67 counties, including one consolidated city-county government.

1. Adams
2. Allegheny
3. Armstrong
4. Beaver
5. Bedford
6. Berks
7. Blair
8. Bradford
9. Bucks
10. Butler
11. Cambria
12. Cameron
13. Carbon
14. Centre
15. Chester
16. Clarion
17. Clearfield
18. Clinton
19. Columbia
20. Crawford
21. Cumberland
22. Dauphin
23. Delaware
24. Elk
25. Erie
26. Fayette
27. Forest
28. Franklin
29. Fulton
30. Greene
31. Huntingdon
32. Indiana
33. Jefferson
34. Juniata
35. Lackawanna
36. Lancaster
37. Lawrence
38. Lebanon
39. Lehigh
40. Luzerne
41. Lycoming
42. McKean
43. Mercer
44. Mifflin
45. Monroe
46. Montgomery
47. Montour
48. Northampton
49. Northumberland
50. Perry
51. Philadelphia (Note: The City of Philadelphia and Philadelphia County have a consolidated city-county government.)
52. Pike
53. Potter
54. Schuylkill
55. Snyder
56. Somerset
57. Sullivan
58. Susquehanna
59. Tioga
60. Union
61. Venango
62. Warren
63. Washington
64. Wayne
65. Westmoreland
66. Wyoming
67. York

== Puerto Rico ==
The Commonwealth of Puerto Rico has no counties. The U.S. Census Bureau counts the 78 municipalities of Puerto Rico as county-equivalents.

1. Adjuntas
2. Aguada
3. Aguadilla
4. Aguas Buenas
5. Aibonito
6. Añasco
7. Arecibo
8. Arroyo
9. Barceloneta
10. Barranquitas
11. Bayamón
12. Cabo Rojo
13. Caguas
14. Camuy
15. Canóvanas
16. Carolina
17. Cataño
18. Cayey
19. Ceiba
20. Ciales
21. Cidra
22. Coamo
23. Comerío
24. Corozal
25. Culebra
26. Dorado
27. Fajardo
28. Florida
29. Guánica
30. Guayama
31. Guayanilla
32. Guaynabo
33. Gurabo
34. Hatillo
35. Hormigueros
36. Humacao
37. Isabela
38. Jayuya
39. Juana Díaz
40. Juncos
41. Lajas
42. Lares
43. Las Marías
44. Las Piedras
45. Loíza
46. Luquillo
47. Manatí
48. Maricao
49. Maunabo
50. Mayagüez
51. Moca
52. Morovis
53. Naguabo
54. Naranjito
55. Orocovis
56. Patillas
57. Peñuelas
58. Ponce
59. Quebradillas
60. Rincón
61. Río Grande
62. Sabana Grande
63. Salinas
64. San Germán
65. San Juan
66. San Lorenzo
67. San Sebastián
68. Santa Isabel
69. Toa Alta
70. Toa Baja
71. Trujillo Alto
72. Utuado
73. Vega Alta
74. Vega Baja
75. Vieques
76. Villalba
77. Yabucoa
78. Yauco

== Rhode Island ==
The State of Rhode Island comprises five counties, tied for the second least out of any state.

1. Bristol
2. Kent
3. Newport
4. Providence
5. Washington

== South Carolina ==
The State of South Carolina comprises 46 counties.

1. Abbeville
2. Aiken
3. Allendale
4. Anderson
5. Bamberg
6. Barnwell
7. Beaufort
8. Berkeley
9. Calhoun
10. Charleston
11. Cherokee
12. Chester
13. Chesterfield
14. Clarendon
15. Colleton
16. Darlington
17. Dillon
18. Dorchester
19. Edgefield
20. Fairfield
21. Florence
22. Georgetown
23. Greenville
24. Greenwood
25. Hampton
26. Horry
27. Jasper
28. Kershaw
29. Lancaster
30. Laurens
31. Lee
32. Lexington
33. Marion
34. Marlboro
35. McCormick
36. Newberry
37. Oconee
38. Orangeburg
39. Pickens
40. Richland
41. Saluda
42. Spartanburg
43. Sumter
44. Union
45. Williamsburg
46. York

== South Dakota ==
The State of South Dakota comprises 66 counties.

1. Aurora
2. Beadle
3. Bennett
4. Bon Homme
5. Brookings
6. Brown
7. Brule
8. Buffalo
9. Butte
10. Campbell
11. Charles Mix
12. Clark
13. Clay
14. Codington
15. Corson
16. Custer
17. Davison
18. Day
19. Deuel
20. Dewey
21. Douglas
22. Edmunds
23. Fall River
24. Faulk
25. Grant
26. Gregory
27. Haakon
28. Hamlin
29. Hand
30. Hanson
31. Harding
32. Hughes
33. Hutchinson
34. Hyde
35. Jackson
36. Jerauld
37. Jones
38. Kingsbury
39. Lake
40. Lawrence
41. Lincoln
42. Lyman
43. Marshall
44. McCook
45. McPherson
46. Meade
47. Mellette
48. Miner
49. Minnehaha
50. Moody
51. Oglala Lakota
52. Pennington
53. Perkins
54. Potter
55. Roberts
56. Sanborn
57. Spink
58. Stanley
59. Sully
60. Todd
61. Tripp
62. Turner
63. Union
64. Walworth
65. Yankton
66. Ziebach

== Tennessee ==
The State of Tennessee comprises 95 counties.

1. Anderson
2. Bedford
3. Benton
4. Bledsoe
5. Blount
6. Bradley
7. Campbell
8. Cannon
9. Carroll
10. Carter
11. Cheatham
12. Chester
13. Claiborne
14. Clay
15. Cocke
16. Coffee
17. Crockett
18. Cumberland
19. Davidson (Note: The City of Nashville and the unincorporated portions of Davidson County have a consolidated city-county government.)
20. Decatur
21. DeKalb
22. Dickson
23. Dyer
24. Fayette
25. Fentress
26. Franklin
27. Gibson
28. Giles
29. Grainger
30. Greene
31. Grundy
32. Hamblen
33. Hamilton
34. Hancock
35. Hardeman
36. Hardin
37. Hawkins
38. Haywood
39. Henderson
40. Henry
41. Hickman
42. Houston
43. Humphreys
44. Jackson
45. Jefferson
46. Johnson
47. Knox
48. Lake
49. Lauderdale
50. Lawrence
51. Lewis
52. Lincoln
53. Loudon
54. Macon
55. Madison
56. Marion
57. Marshall
58. Maury
59. McMinn
60. McNairy
61. Meigs
62. Monroe
63. Montgomery
64. Moore (Note: The City of Lynchburg and the unincorporated portions of Moore County have a consolidated city-county government.)
65. Morgan
66. Obion
67. Overton
68. Perry
69. Pickett
70. Polk
71. Putnam
72. Rhea
73. Roane
74. Robertson
75. Rutherford
76. Scott
77. Sequatchie
78. Sevier
79. Shelby
80. Smith
81. Stewart
82. Sullivan
83. Sumner
84. Tipton
85. Trousdale (Note: The City of Hartsville and the unincorporated portions of Trousdale County have a consolidated city-county government.)
86. Unicoi
87. Union
88. Van Buren
89. Warren
90. Washington
91. Wayne
92. Weakley
93. White
94. Williamson
95. Wilson

== Texas ==
The State of Texas comprises 254 counties, the most of any state

1. Anderson
2. Andrews
3. Angelina
4. Aransas
5. Archer
6. Armstrong
7. Atascosa
8. Austin
9. Bailey
10. Bandera
11. Bastrop
12. Baylor
13. Bee
14. Bell
15. Bexar
16. Blanco
17. Borden
18. Bosque
19. Bowie
20. Brazoria
21. Brazos
22. Brewster
23. Briscoe
24. Brooks
25. Brown
26. Burleson
27. Burnet
28. Caldwell
29. Calhoun
30. Callahan
31. Cameron
32. Camp
33. Carson
34. Cass
35. Castro
36. Chambers
37. Cherokee
38. Childress
39. Clay
40. Cochran
41. Coke
42. Coleman
43. Collin
44. Collingsworth
45. Colorado
46. Comal
47. Comanche
48. Concho
49. Cooke
50. Coryell
51. Cottle
52. Crane
53. Crockett
54. Crosby
55. Culberson
56. Dallam
57. Dallas
58. Dawson
59. Deaf Smith
60. Delta
61. Denton
62. DeWitt
63. Dickens
64. Dimmit
65. Donley
66. Duval
67. Eastland
68. Ector
69. Edwards
70. Ellis
71. El Paso
72. Erath
73. Falls
74. Fannin
75. Fayette
76. Fisher
77. Floyd
78. Foard
79. Fort Bend
80. Franklin
81. Freestone
82. Frio
83. Gaines
84. Galveston
85. Garza
86. Gillespie
87. Glasscock
88. Goliad
89. Gonzales
90. Gray
91. Grayson
92. Gregg
93. Grimes
94. Guadalupe
95. Hale
96. Hall
97. Hamilton
98. Hansford
99. Hardeman
100. Hardin
101. Harris
102. Harrison
103. Hartley
104. Haskell
105. Hays
106. Hemphill
107. Henderson
108. Hidalgo
109. Hill
110. Hockley
111. Hood
112. Hopkins
113. Houston
114. Howard
115. Hudspeth
116. Hunt
117. Hutchinson
118. Irion
119. Jack
120. Jackson
121. Jasper
122. Jeff Davis
123. Jefferson
124. Jim Hogg
125. Jim Wells
126. Johnson
127. Jones
128. Karnes
129. Kaufman
130. Kendall
131. Kenedy
132. Kent
133. Kerr
134. Kimble
135. King
136. Kinney
137. Kleberg
138. Knox
139. Lamar
140. Lamb
141. Lampasas
142. LaSalle
143. Lavaca
144. Lee
145. Leon
146. Liberty
147. Limestone
148. Lipscomb
149. Live Oak
150. Llano
151. Loving
152. Lubbock
153. Lynn
154. Madison
155. Marion
156. Martin
157. Mason
158. Matagorda
159. Maverick
160. McCulloch
161. McLennan
162. McMullen
163. Medina
164. Menard
165. Midland
166. Milam
167. Mills
168. Mitchell
169. Montague
170. Montgomery
171. Moore
172. Morris
173. Motley
174. Nacogdoches
175. Navarro
176. Newton
177. Nolan
178. Nueces
179. Ochiltree
180. Oldham
181. Orange
182. Palo Pinto
183. Panola
184. Parker
185. Parmer
186. Pecos
187. Polk
188. Potter
189. Presidio
190. Rains
191. Randall
192. Reagan
193. Real
194. Red River
195. Reeves
196. Refugio
197. Roberts
198. Robertson
199. Rockwall
200. Runnels
201. Rusk
202. Sabine
203. San Augustine
204. San Jacinto
205. San Patricio
206. San Saba
207. Schleicher
208. Scurry
209. Shackelford
210. Shelby
211. Sherman
212. Smith
213. Somervell
214. Starr
215. Stephens
216. Sterling
217. Stonewall
218. Sutton
219. Swisher
220. Tarrant
221. Taylor
222. Terrell
223. Terry
224. Throckmorton
225. Titus
226. Tom Green
227. Travis
228. Trinity
229. Tyler
230. Upshur
231. Upton
232. Uvalde
233. Val Verde
234. Van Zandt
235. Victoria
236. Walker
237. Waller
238. Ward
239. Washington
240. Webb
241. Wharton
242. Wheeler
243. Wichita
244. Wilbarger
245. Willacy
246. Williamson
247. Wilson
248. Winkler
249. Wise
250. Wood
251. Yoakum
252. Young
253. Zapata
254. Zavala

== U.S. Minor Outlying Islands ==
The U.S. Minor Outlying Islands have no counties. The U.S. Census Bureau counts each of the nine islands of the U.S. Minor Outlying Islands as county-equivalents.

1. Baker Island
2. Howland Island
3. Jarvis Island
4. Johnston Atoll
5. Kingman Reef
6. Midway Atoll
7. Navassa Island
8. Palmyra Atoll
9. Wake Island

== Utah ==
The State of Utah comprises 29 counties.

1. Beaver
2. Box Elder
3. Cache
4. Carbon
5. Daggett
6. Davis
7. Duchesne
8. Emery
9. Garfield
10. Grand
11. Iron
12. Juab
13. Kane
14. Millard
15. Morgan
16. Piute
17. Rich
18. Salt Lake
19. San Juan
20. Sanpete
21. Sevier
22. Summit
23. Tooele
24. Uintah
25. Utah
26. Wasatch
27. Washington
28. Wayne
29. Weber

== Vermont ==
The State of Vermont comprises 14 counties.

1. Addison
2. Bennington
3. Caledonia
4. Chittenden
5. Essex
6. Franklin
7. Grand Isle
8. Lamoille
9. Orange
10. Orleans
11. Rutland
12. Washington
13. Windham
14. Windsor

== Virgin Islands (USA) ==
The U.S. Virgin Islands have no counties. The U.S. Census Bureau counts the 3 main islands of the U.S. Virgin Islands as county-equivalents.

1. St. Croix
2. St. John
3. St. Thomas

== Virginia ==
The Commonwealth of Virginia comprises 95 counties and 38 independent cities, totaling 133 subdivisions, the third most of any state.

1. Accomack
2. Albemarle
3. Alleghany
4. Amelia
5. Amherst
6. Appomattox
7. Arlington
8. Augusta
9. Bath
10. Bedford
11. Bland
12. Botetourt
13. Brunswick
14. Buchanan
15. Buckingham
16. Campbell
17. Caroline
18. Carroll
19. Charles City
20. Charlotte
21. Chesterfield
22. Clarke
23. Craig
24. Culpeper
25. Cumberland
26. Dickenson
27. Dinwiddie
28. Essex
29. Fairfax
30. Fauquier
31. Floyd
32. Fluvanna
33. Franklin
34. Frederick
35. Giles
36. Gloucester
37. Goochland
38. Grayson
39. Greene
40. Greensville
41. Halifax
42. Hanover
43. Henrico
44. Henry
45. Highland
46. Isle of Wight
47. James City
48. King and Queen
49. King George
50. King William
51. Lancaster
52. Lee
53. Loudoun
54. Louisa
55. Lunenburg
56. Madison
57. Mathews
58. Mecklenburg
59. Middlesex
60. Montgomery
61. Nelson
62. New Kent
63. Northampton
64. Northumberland
65. Nottoway
66. Orange
67. Page
68. Patrick
69. Pittsylvania
70. Powhatan
71. Prince Edward
72. Prince George
73. Prince William
74. Pulaski
75. Rappahannock
76. Richmond
77. Roanoke
78. Rockbridge
79. Rockingham
80. Russell
81. Scott
82. Shenandoah
83. Smyth
84. Southampton
85. Spotsylvania
86. Stafford
87. Surry
88. Sussex
89. Tazewell
90. Warren
91. Washington
92. Westmoreland
93. Wise
94. Wythe
95. York
96. Alexandria (Note: The 38 independent cities of the United States are county-equivalents.)
97. Bristol
98. Buena Vista
99. Charlottesville
100. Chesapeake
101. Colonial Heights
102. Covington
103. Danville
104. Emporia
105. Fairfax
106. Falls Church
107. Franklin
108. Fredericksburg
109. Galax
110. Hampton
111. Harrisonburg
112. Hopewell
113. Lexington
114. Lynchburg
115. Manassas
116. Manassas Park
117. Martinsville
118. Newport News
119. Norfolk
120. Norton
121. Petersburg
122. Poquoson
123. Portsmouth
124. Radford
125. Richmond
126. Roanoke
127. Salem
128. Staunton
129. Suffolk
130. Virginia Beach
131. Waynesboro
132. Williamsburg
133. Winchester

== Washington ==
The State of Washington comprises 39 counties.

1. Adams
2. Asotin
3. Benton
4. Chelan
5. Clallam
6. Clark
7. Columbia
8. Cowlitz
9. Douglas
10. Ferry
11. Franklin
12. Garfield
13. Grant
14. Grays Harbor
15. Island
16. Jefferson
17. King
18. Kitsap
19. Kittitas
20. Klickitat
21. Lewis
22. Lincoln
23. Mason
24. Okanogan
25. Pacific
26. Pend Oreille
27. Pierce
28. San Juan
29. Skagit
30. Skamania
31. Snohomish
32. Spokane
33. Stevens
34. Thurston
35. Wahkiakum
36. Walla Walla
37. Whatcom
38. Whitman
39. Yakima

== West Virginia ==
The State of West Virginia comprises 55 counties.

1. Barbour
2. Berkeley
3. Boone
4. Braxton
5. Brooke
6. Cabell
7. Calhoun
8. Clay
9. Doddridge
10. Fayette
11. Gilmer
12. Grant
13. Greenbrier
14. Hampshire
15. Hancock
16. Hardy
17. Harrison
18. Jackson
19. Jefferson
20. Kanawha
21. Lewis
22. Lincoln
23. Logan
24. Marion
25. Marshall
26. Mason
27. McDowell
28. Mercer
29. Mineral
30. Mingo
31. Monongalia
32. Monroe
33. Morgan
34. Nicholas
35. Ohio
36. Pendleton
37. Pleasants
38. Pocahontas
39. Preston
40. Putnam
41. Raleigh
42. Randolph
43. Ritchie
44. Roane
45. Summers
46. Taylor
47. Tucker
48. Tyler
49. Upshur
50. Wayne
51. Webster
52. Wetzel
53. Wirt
54. Wood
55. Wyoming

== Wisconsin ==
The State of Wisconsin comprises 72 counties.

1. Adams
2. Ashland
3. Barron
4. Bayfield
5. Brown
6. Buffalo
7. Burnett
8. Calumet
9. Chippewa
10. Clark
11. Columbia
12. Crawford
13. Dane
14. Dodge
15. Door
16. Douglas
17. Dunn
18. Eau Claire
19. Florence
20. Fond du Lac
21. Forest
22. Grant
23. Green
24. Green Lake
25. Iowa
26. Iron
27. Jackson
28. Jefferson
29. Juneau
30. Kenosha
31. Kewaunee
32. La Crosse
33. Lafayette
34. Langlade
35. Lincoln
36. Manitowoc
37. Marathon
38. Marinette
39. Marquette
40. Menominee
41. Milwaukee
42. Monroe
43. Oconto
44. Oneida
45. Outagamie
46. Ozaukee
47. Pepin
48. Pierce
49. Polk
50. Portage
51. Price
52. Racine
53. Richland
54. Rock
55. Rusk
56. St. Croix
57. Sauk
58. Sawyer
59. Shawano
60. Sheboygan
61. Taylor
62. Trempealeau
63. Vernon
64. Vilas
65. Walworth
66. Washburn
67. Washington
68. Waukesha
69. Waupaca
70. Waushara
71. Winnebago
72. Wood

== Wyoming ==
The State of Wyoming comprises 23 counties.

1. Albany
2. Big Horn
3. Campbell
4. Carbon
5. Converse
6. Crook
7. Fremont
8. Goshen
9. Hot Springs
10. Johnson
11. Laramie
12. Lincoln
13. Natrona
14. Niobrara
15. Park
16. Platte
17. Sheridan
18. Sublette
19. Sweetwater
20. Teton
21. Uinta
22. Washakie
23. Weston

== See also ==
- Index of U.S. counties
- List of the least populous counties in the United States
- List of the most common U.S. county names
- List of the most populous counties in the United States
- Lists of U.S. county name etymologies
