= Survey of Consumer Expectations =

The Survey of Consumer Expectations is a monthly survey of U.S. households by the New York Federal Reserve Bank. The people are asked about how much the expect to spend, how high they expect inflation to be, their employment situation, and whether they are searching for a job.

== Methodology ==
About 4500 consumers have been surveyed each year since 2013. Survey results are calibrated to be demographically representative of U.S. households. Monthly survey results and detailed microdata are published at the New York Fed site.

== Results ==
The survey's results are used to make inferences about public expectations of U.S. dollar inflation.

The survey has illuminated the degree to which employed workers are offered much higher-wage jobs than the unemployed, even holding constant the observable attributes of the workers.
