= United States presidential approval rating =

Historical approval ratings of the US president

In the United States, presidential job approval ratings were first conducted about 1937 by George Gallup to gauge public support for the president of the United States during their term. An approval rating is a percentage of a population sample who approve of a particular person or program, as determined by an opinion poll. Typically, a politician is assigned an approval rating based on responses to a poll in which a sample of people are asked whether they approve or disapprove of that politician. A question might ask: "Do you approve or disapprove of the way that the current president is handling their job as president?"

Like most surveys that measure opinions, individual poll results may be inaccurate. Many unscientific approval rating systems exist that give inaccurate statistics, such as surveys that self-select, as in online questions. However, the aggregate presidential approval rating is generally accepted by statisticians as a statistically valid indicator of the comparative changes in the popular U.S. mood regarding a president. George W. Bush registered a 90% job approval rating (the highest in Gallup's tracking) shortly after the terrorist attacks on September 11, 2001. Harry S. Truman registered a 22% job approval rating (the lowest in Gallup's tracking) in a survey conducted February 9–14, 1952.

In 2026, Gallup announced that it would cease its polling of presidential approval ratings, as well as those of other public figures. Thus, Rasmussen polling is used for Donald Trump's second term, which runs from 2025 to 2029.

== Historical comparison ==
Rasmussen Poll approval highs and lows for each president 2025–present
#	President	Years in office	Approval				Disapproval		Margin		Final poll	Polls per year
#	President	Years in office	Avg	Highest	Lowest	Diff	Highest	Lowest	Highest	Lowest	Final poll	Polls per year
47	Donald Trump	2025–2026	TBD	56 (2025-01-23)	36 (2025-11-28, 2025-12-15)	20	60 (2026-10-28,2026-05-07, 2026-06-04, 2026-06-08, 2026-07-03)	40 (2025-01-23)	0 (2025-04-03, 2024-04-24, 2025-05-19, 2025-05-21, 2025-05-22, 2025-07-09, 2025-07-17, 2025-08-13, 2025-08-15, 2025-08-20, 2025-08-21, 2025-08-22, 2025-09-25, 2025-09-30)	-18 (2026-06-04, 2026-06-08, 2026-07-03)	TBD	

Historical Gallup Poll approval highs and lows for each president 1937–2025 (Note: Only the results of Gallup polls are included as no other poll results exist for presidents before President Clinton.)
#	President	Years in office	Approval				Disapproval		Margin		Final poll	Polls per year
#	President	Years in office	Avg	Highest	Lowest	Diff	Highest	Lowest	Highest	Lowest	Final poll	Polls per year
46	Joe Biden	2021–2025	42	57 (2021-02-02, 2021-04-21)	36 (2024-07-21)	21	59 (2022-07-26, 2023-04-25, 2023-10-23, 2023-11-21, 2023-12-20, 2024-02-20)	37 (2021-02-02)	20 (2021-02-02)	−22 (2023-04-25, 2023-10-23, 2023-11-21, 2024-07-21)	40 (2025-01-15)	12
45	Donald Trump	2017–2021	41	49 (2020-01-29, 2020-02-16, 2020-03-22, 2020-04-28, 2020-05-13)	34 (2021-01-15)	15	62 (2021-01-15)	45 (2017-01-22, 2020-03-22)	4 (2020-03-22)	−28 (2021-01-15)	34 (2021-01-15)	40
44	Barack Obama	2009–2017	48	69 (2009-01-24)	38 (2014-09-05)	31	57 (2014-10-10)	12 (2009-01-23)	56 (2009-01-23, 2009-01-24)	−18 (2014-10-10)	59 (2017-01-19)	48.4
43	George W. Bush	2001–2009	49	90 (2001-09-22)	25 (2008-10-05, 2008-10-12, 2008-11-02)	65	71 (2008-10-10)	6 (2001-09-22)	84 (2001-09-22)	−46 (2008-10-12)	34 (2009-01-11)	33.7
42	Bill Clinton	1993–2001	55	73 (1998-12-20)	37 (1993-06-06)	36	54 (1994-09-07)	20 (1993-01-26)	48 (1998-12-20)	−14 (1994-09-07)	66 (2001-01-14)	28.5
41	George H. W. Bush	1989–1993	61	89 (1991-02-28)	29 (1992-08-02)	60	60 (1992-07-31)	6 (1989-01-26)	82 (1991-03-03)	−30 (1992-08-02, 1992-10-13)	56 (1993-01-11)	39.5
40	Ronald Reagan	1981–1989	53	68 (1986-05-19)	35 (1983-01-31)	33	56 (1983-01-31)	13 (1981-02-02)	49 (1981-04-06)	−21 (1983-01-31)	63 (1988-12-29)	37.0
39	Jimmy Carter	1977–1981	46	75 (1977-03-21)	28 (1979-07-02)	47	59 (1979-07-02)	8 (1977-02-07, 1977-03-02)	66 (1977-03-15)	−31 (1979-07-02)	34 (1980-12-08)	22.7
38	Gerald Ford	1974–1977	47	71 (1974-08-19)	37 (1975-03-31)	34	48 (1975-03-31)	3 (1974-08-19)	67 (1974-08-13)	−11 (1975-03-31)	53 (1976-12-13)	14.7
37	Richard Nixon	1969–1974	49	67 (1969-11-17, 1973-01-29)	24 (1974-07-15, 1974-07-26, 1974-08-05)	43	66 (1974-08-05)	5 (1969-01-28)	57 (1969-03-17)	−42 (1974-08-05)	24 (1974-08-05)	17.7
36	Lyndon B. Johnson	1963–1969	55	79 (1964-03-05)	35 (1968-08-12)	44	53 (1968-08-12)	2 (1963-12-10)	75 (1963-12-10)	−18 (1968-08-12)	49 (1969-01-06)	15.3
35	John F. Kennedy	1961–1963	70	82 (1961-05-03, 1961-06-06)	56 (1963-09-17)	26	30 (1963-11-13)	5 (1961-04-11)	77 (1961-05-03)	27 (1963-09-17)	58 (1963-11-13)	13.7
34	Dwight D. Eisenhower	1953–1961	65	79 (1956-12-19)	48 (1958-04-01)	31	36 (1958-04-01)	7 (1953-02-05)	66 (1953-04-02, 1956-12-19)	12 (1958-04-01)	59 (1960-12-13)	14.4
33	Harry Truman	1945–1953	45	87 (1945-06-05)	22 (1951-11-16, 1952-02-14)	65	67 (1952-01-06)	3 (1945-06-05)	85 (1945-08-22)	−43 (1952-01-04)	32 (1952-12-16)	8.4
32	Franklin D. Roosevelt	1933–1945	63	83 (1942-01-23)	48 (1939-08-18)	35	46 (1938-05-22, 1938-05-29, 1938-11-07)		73 (1942-01-23)		65 (1943-12-15)	8

=== Approval at the beginning of the presidency ===
Historical Gallup Poll approval at the beginning of each presidency since 1953
Presidency	President	Initial approval	Initial disapproval
47	Trump	47 (2025-01-29)	48 (2025-01-29)
46	Biden	57 (2021-02-02)	37 (2021-02-02)
45	Trump	45 (2017-01-22)	45 (2017-01-22)
44	Obama	68 (2009-01-23)	12 (2009-01-23)
43	G. W. Bush	57 (2001-02-05)	25 (2001-02-05)
42	Clinton	58 (1993-01-24)	20 (1993-01-24)
41	G. H. W. Bush	51 (1989-01-26)	6 (1989-01-26)
40	Reagan	51 (1981-02-02)	13 (1981-02-02)
39	Carter	66 (1977-01-07)	8 (1977-01-07)
38	Ford	71 (1974-08-19)	3 (1974-08-19)
37	Nixon	59 (1969-01-28)	5 (1969-01-28)
36	Johnson	78 (1963-12-10)	2 (1963-12-10)
35	Kennedy	72 (1961-02-15)	6 (1961-02-15)
34	Eisenhower	68 (1953-02-05)	7 (1953-02-05)
33	Truman	87 (1945-06-05)	3 (1945-06-05)

=== Historical net approval of each presidency ===
Historical average polling approval of each presidency since 1953. Polling figures are the unweighted mean of both polling averages reported by Real Clear Politics and FiveThirtyEight.
Presidency	President	Average initial approval	Average initial disapproval	Net initial approval	Average final approval	Average final disapproval	Net final approval	Initial to final change
47 (Note: Trump's second term polling numbers will reflect only the unweighted mean of polling averages reported by Real Clear Politics given the closure of FiveThirtyEight due to employee cuts at ABC News Group by parent company Disney.)	Trump	47	41	+6	—	—	—	—
46	Biden	57.5	37.5	+20	37.9	56.9	-19	-39
45	Trump	45	45	0	41.1	56.1	-15	-15
44	Obama	68.5	12.5	+56	59	37	+22	-34
43	G. W. Bush	57	25	+32	34	61	-27	-59
42	Clinton	58	20	+38	66	29	+37	-1
41	G. H. W. Bush	51	6	+45	56	37	+19	-26
40	Reagan	51	13	+38	63	29	+34	-4
39	Carter	66	8	+58	34	55	-21	-79
38	Ford	71	3	+68	53	32	+21	-47
37	Nixon	59	5	+54	24	66	-42	-96
36	Johnson	78	2	+76	49	33	+16	-60
35	Kennedy	72	6	+66	58	28	+30	-36
34	Eisenhower	68	7	+61	59	28	+31	-30
33	Truman	87	3	+84	32	56	-24	-108

=== Graphs ===
Gallup Poll graphs of approval ratings for former presidents of the United States

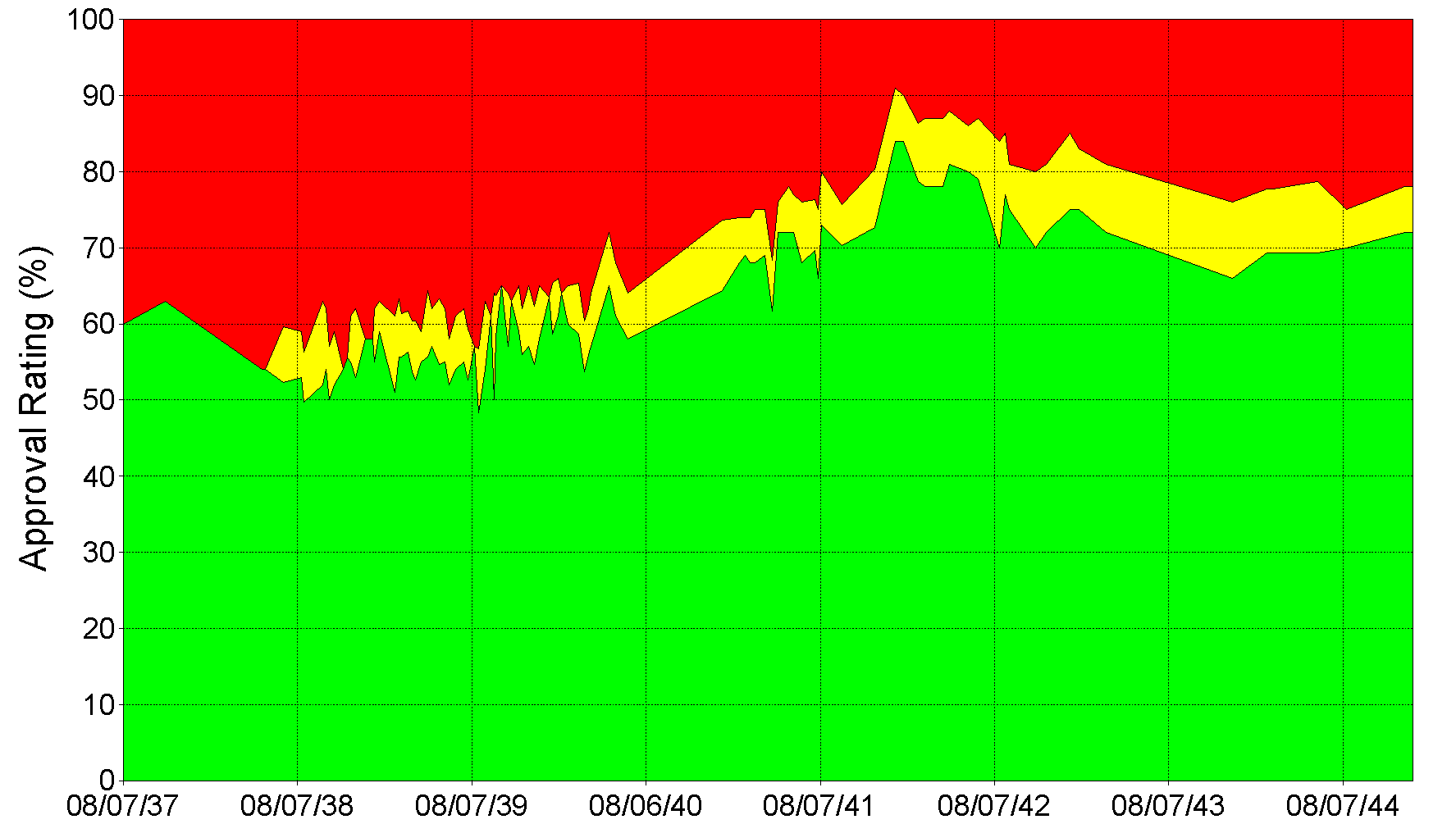
Franklin D. Roosevelt

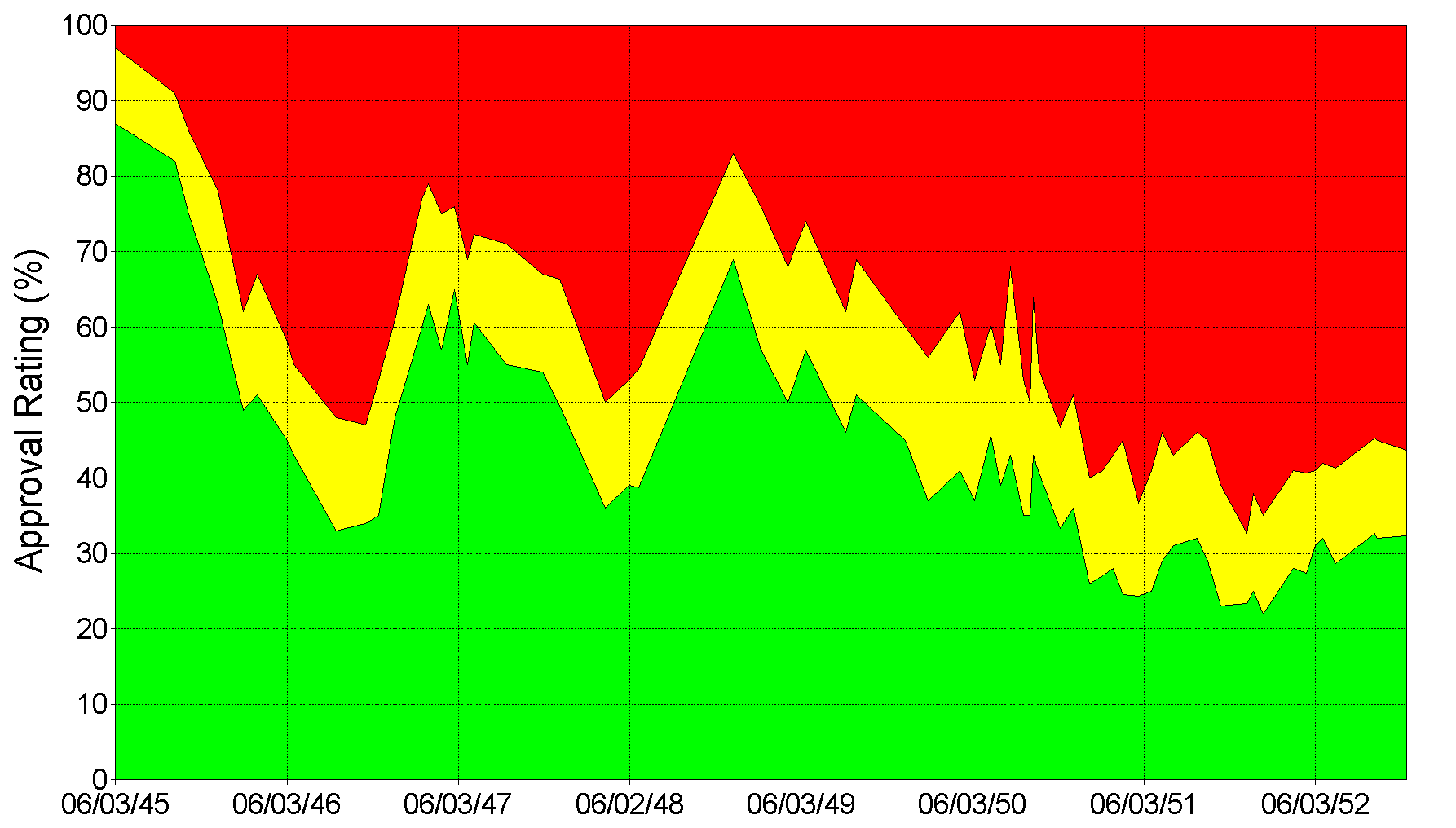
Harry S. Truman

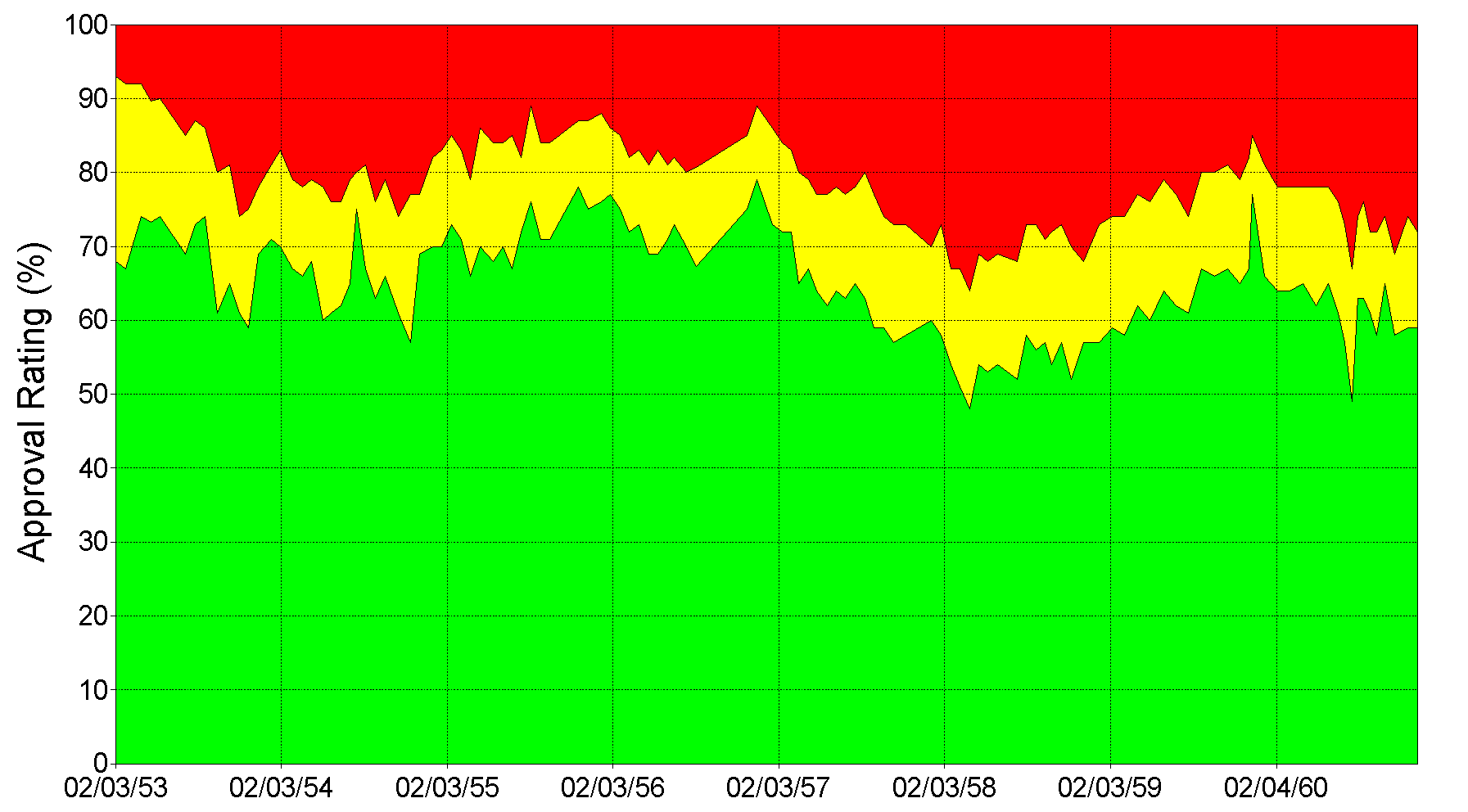
Dwight D. Eisenhower

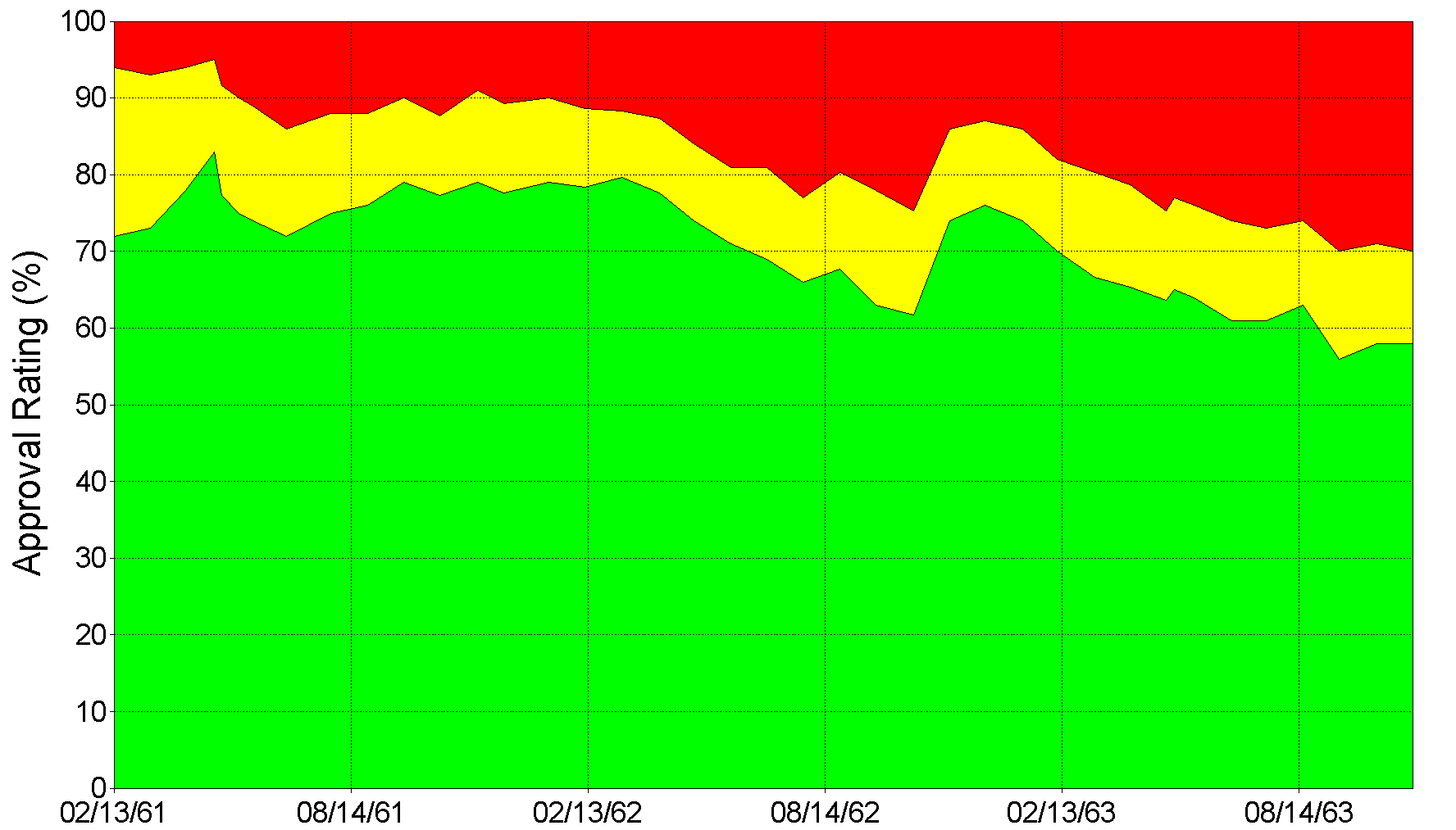
John F. Kennedy

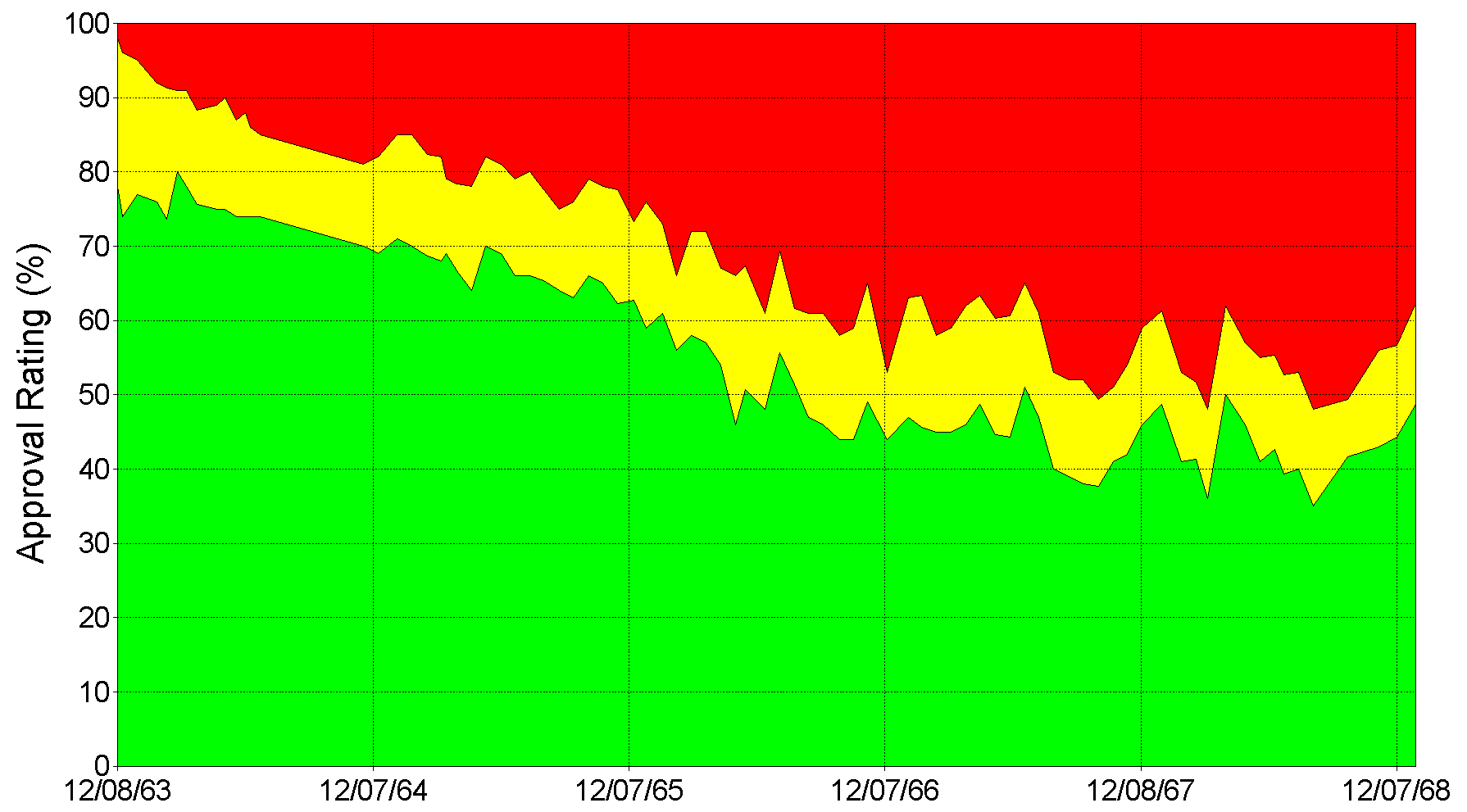
Lyndon B. Johnson

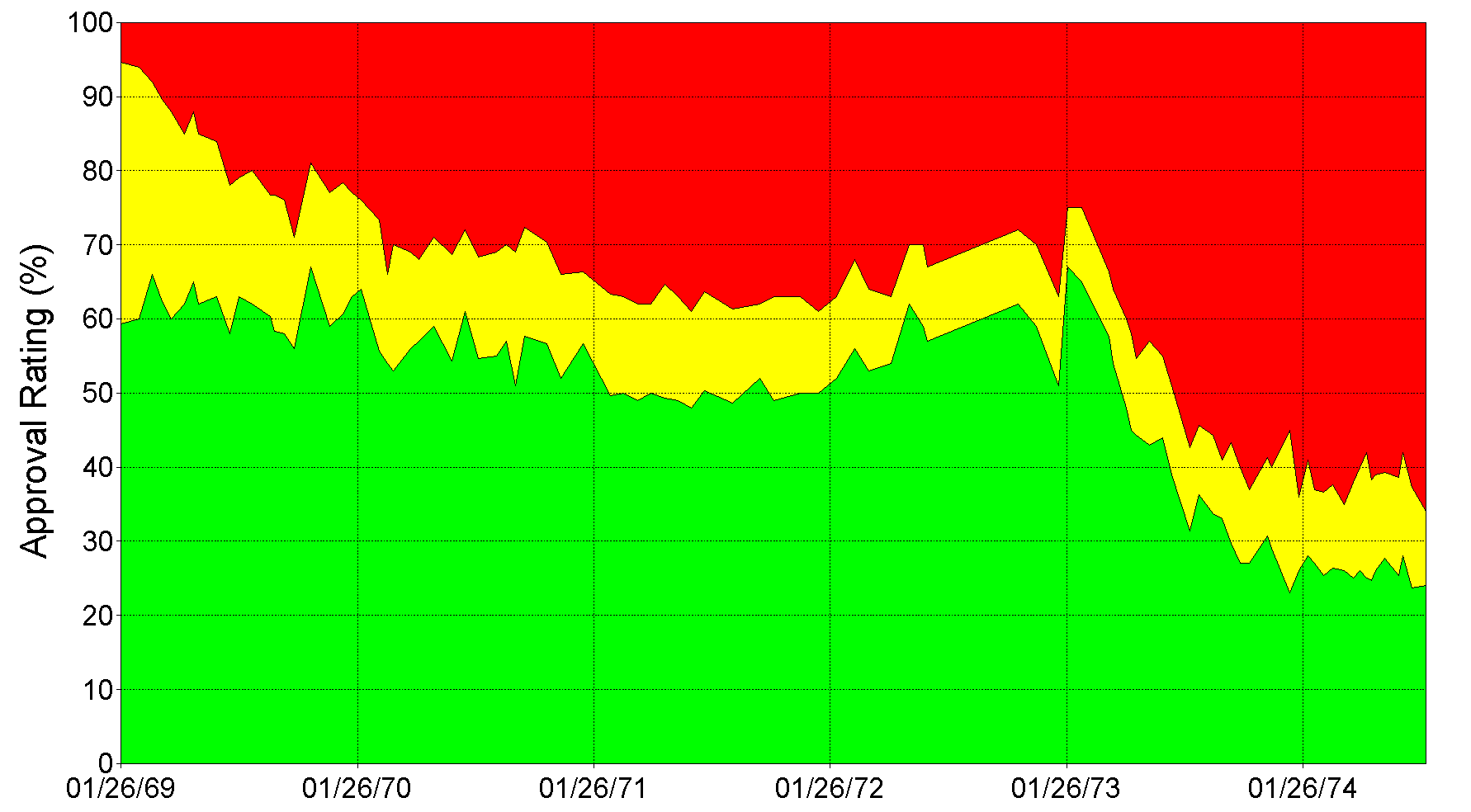
Richard Nixon

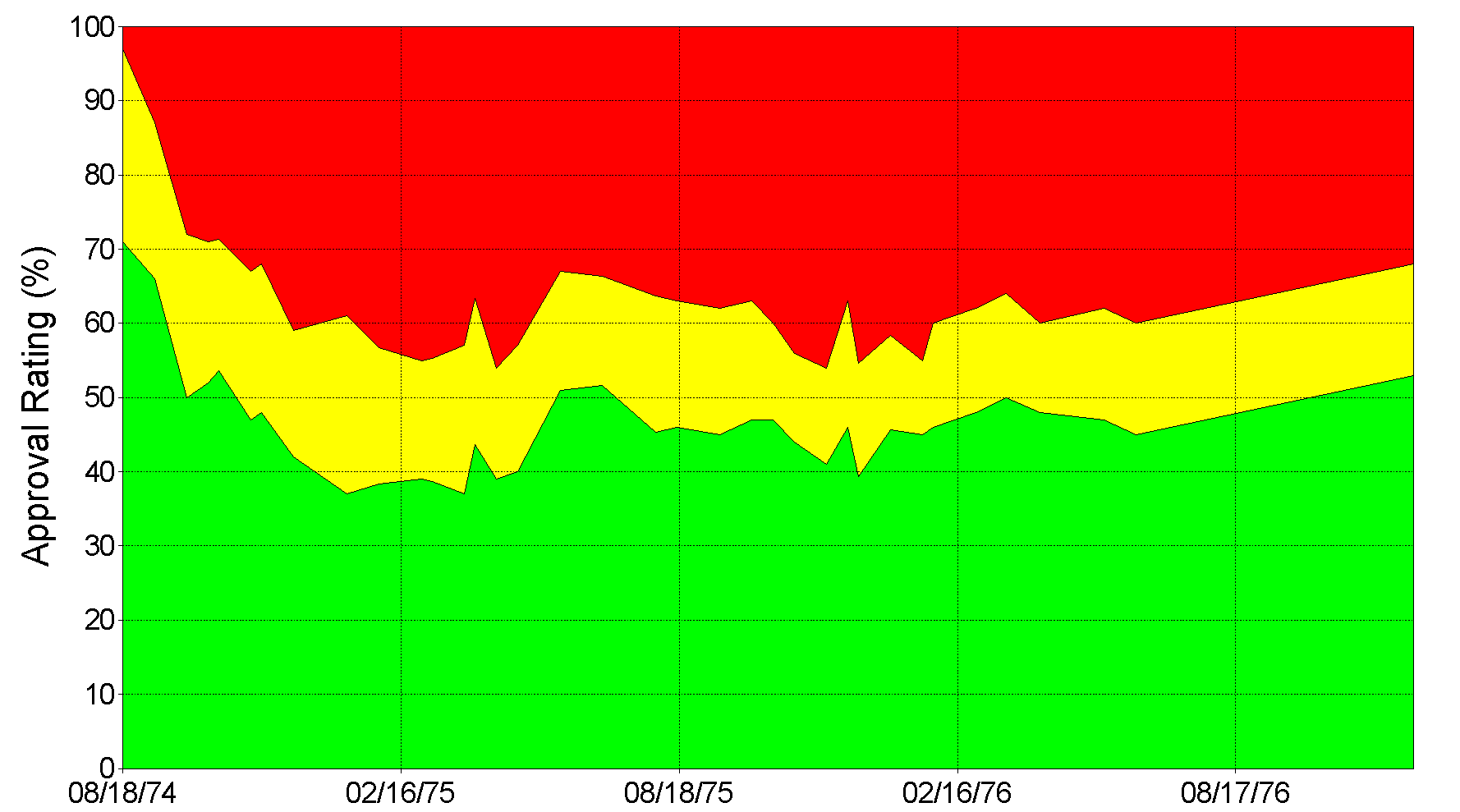
Gerald Ford

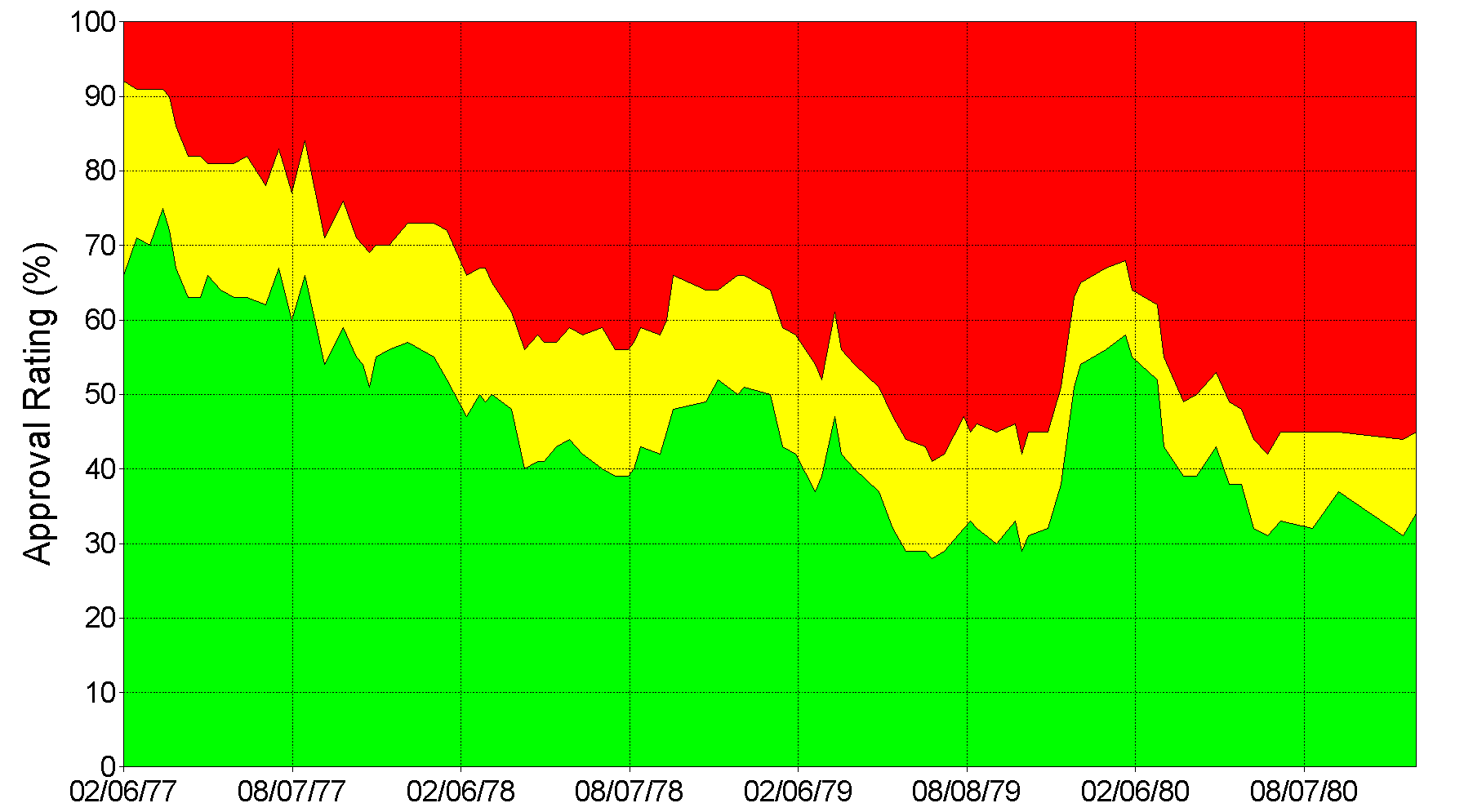
Jimmy Carter

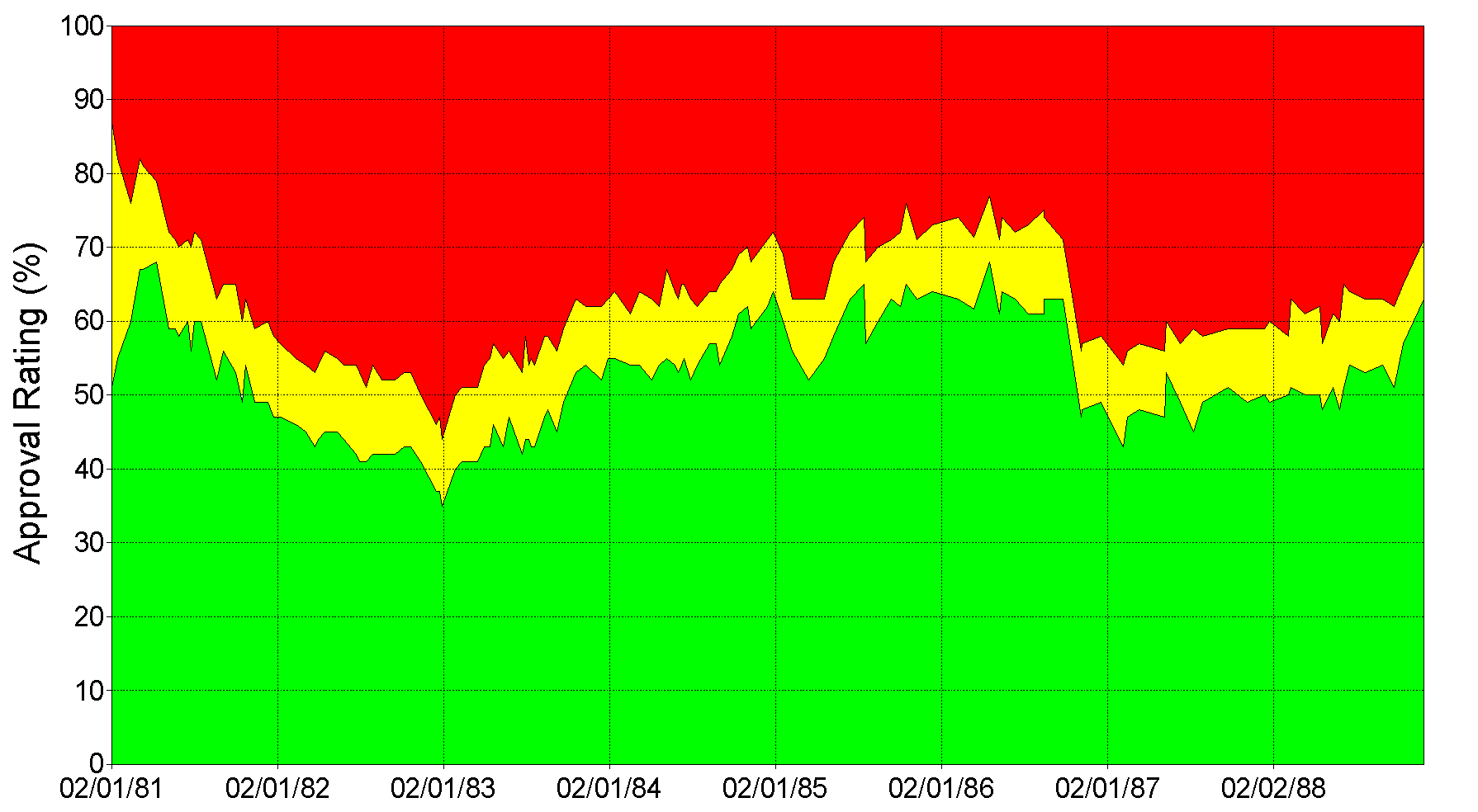
Ronald Reagan

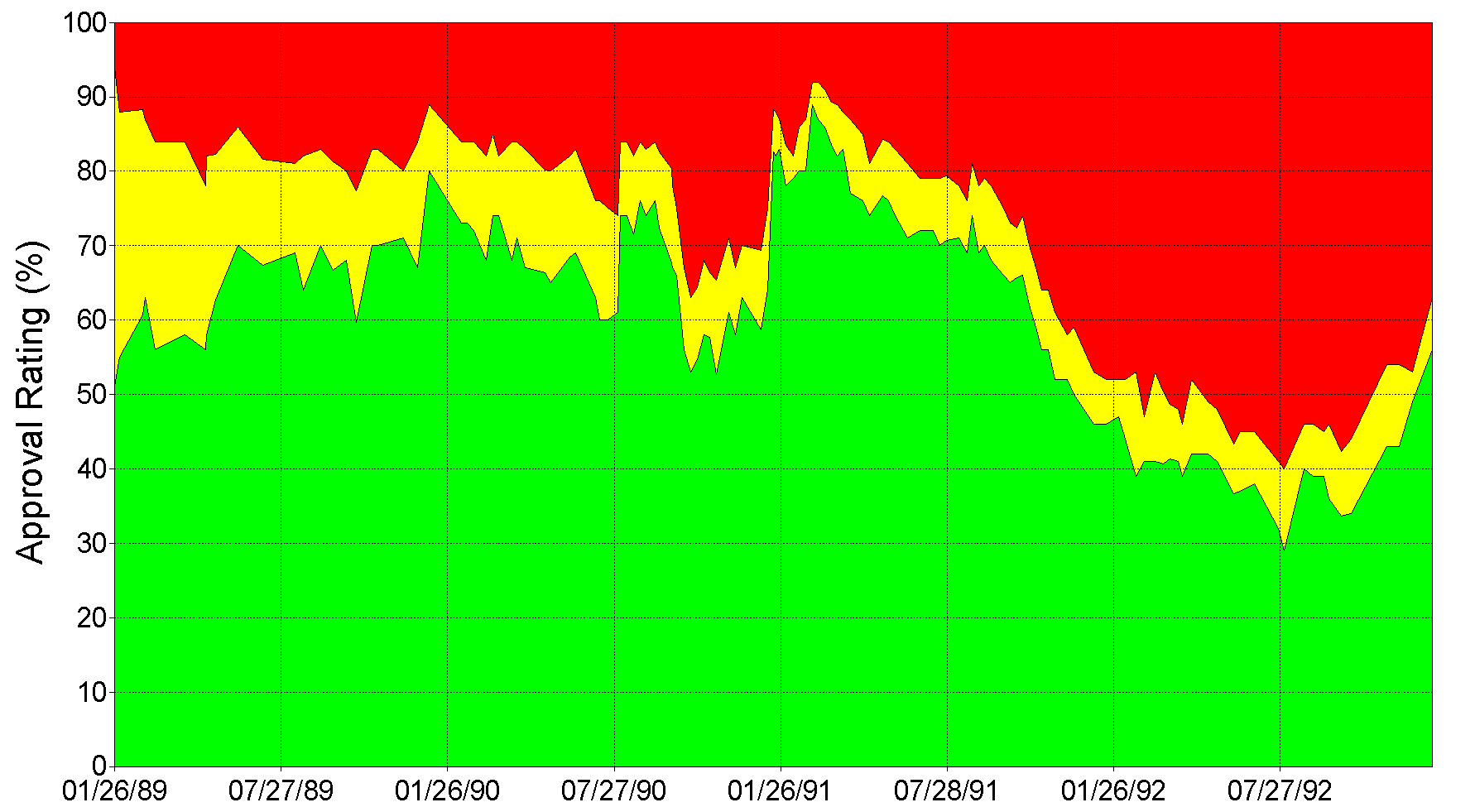
George H. W. Bush

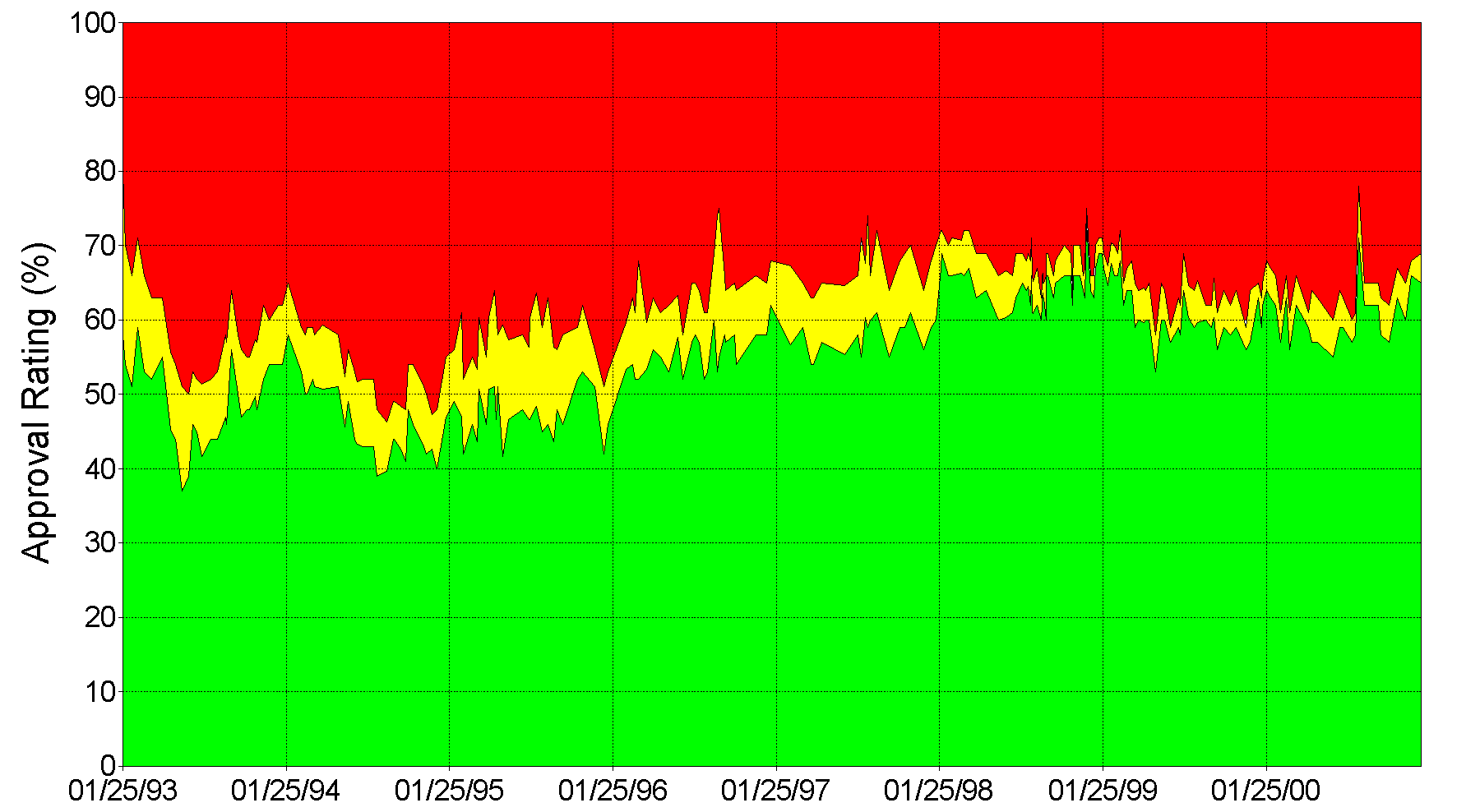
Bill Clinton

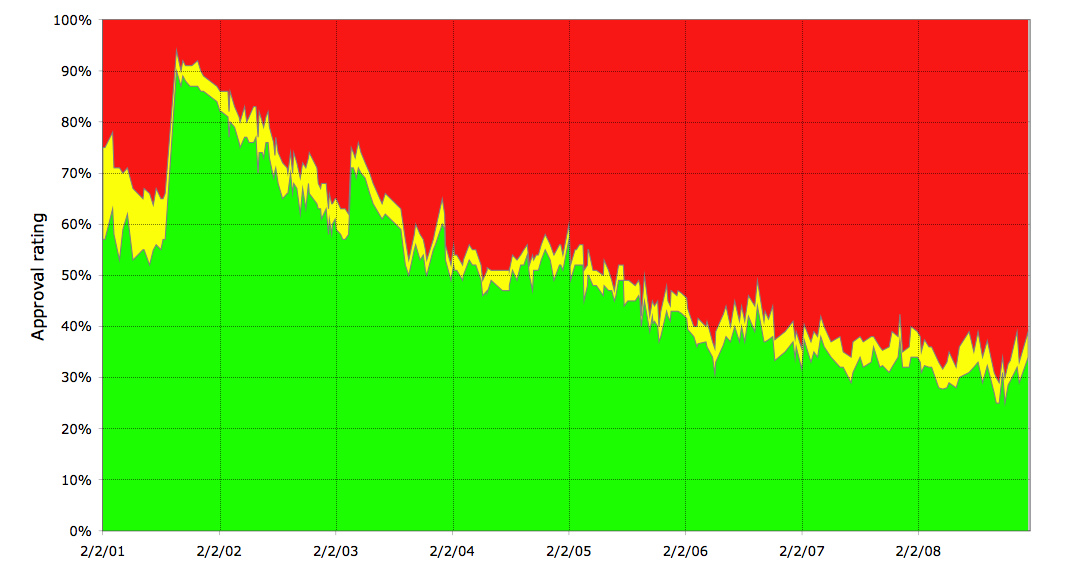
George W. Bush

Barack Obama

Donald Trump (first presidency)

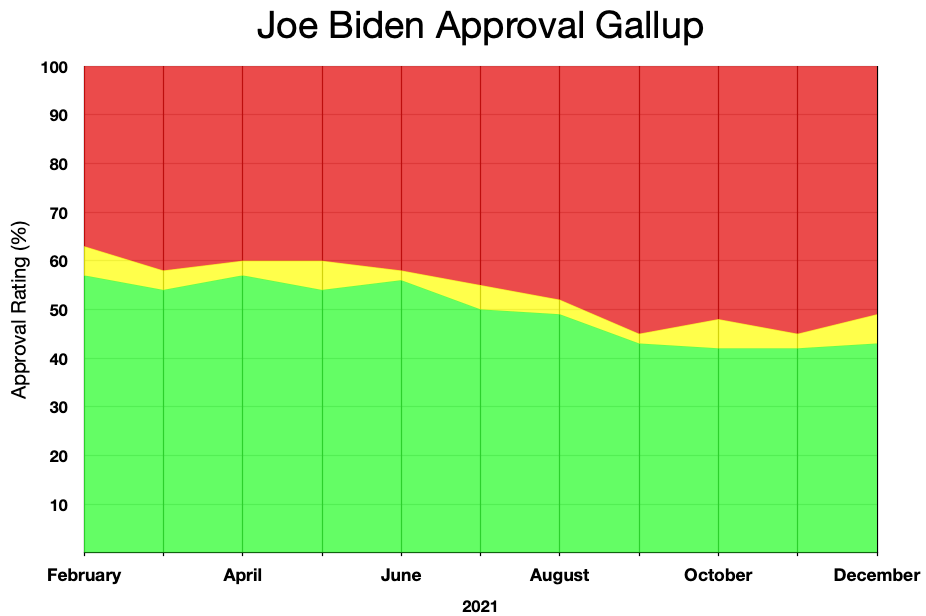
Joe Biden (2021)

== See also ==
- Historical rankings of presidents of the United States
- List of heads of the executive by approval rating
- Opinion polling on the first Trump presidency
- Opinion polling on the second Trump presidency
- Opinion polling on the Biden administration
- Opinion polling on the Reagan administration
