= Opinion polling on the Reagan administration =

Surveying on 1981–1989 US administration

Since 1981, there has been opinion polling on the Ronald Reagan administration to gather and analyze public opinion on the performance and policies of the Ronald Reagan administration.

After becoming president on January 20, 1981, Reagan survived an assassination attempt. CBS News launched their opinion polls with their first one showing 67% of Americans approving the president's job performance. Similarly, an ABC News poll showed Reagan's highest approval rating at 73%. His ratings by CBS remained above 50% until the United States experienced a recession and high unemployment in 1982. According to a Gallup poll, his lowest rating was 35% in early 1983. Headed into the 1984 presidential election, Reagan's ratings by CBS recovered, reaching 58% and higher throughout the next two years. However, in January 1987, Gallup revealed that his rating dropped to 49% as a result of the Iran–Contra affair. By December 1988, the near end of his presidency, Reagan's rating recovered again at 63%. Retrospective polls showed that a majority of Americans continued to approve of the Reagan presidency in the years and decades that followed it.

== Retrospective approval ratings ==
| Pollster | Segment | Date(s) | Approve | Disapprove | Unsure/no data | Sample | Method | Source(s) |
|---|---|---|---|---|---|---|---|---|
| Gallup | — | February 5–11, 2018 | 72% | 24% | 4% | — | — | |
| Gallup | — | November 19–21, 2010 | 74% | 24% | 2% | — | — | |
| Gallup | — | June 1–4, 2006 | 71% | 27% | 2% | — | — | |
| Gallup | — | March 18–20, 2002 | 73% | 22% | 5% | — | — | |
| ABC News/The Washington Post | All adults | July 26–30, 2001 | 66% | 27% | 7% | 1,352 | telephone | |
| ABC News/The Washington Post | — | February 27, 2000 | 64% | 26% | 10% | — | — | |
| Gallup | — | February 14–15, 2000 | 66% | 32% | 2% | — | — | |
| Gallup | — | February 8–9, 1999 | 71% | 27% | 2% | — | — | |
| Gallup | — | November 15–16, 1993 | 52% | 45% | 3% | — | — | |
| Gallup | — | June 4–8, 1992 | 50% | 47% | 3% | — | — | |
| Gallup | — | November 8–11, 1990 | 54% | 44% | 2% | — | — | |

majority approve plurality approve majority disapprove plurality disapprove

== Presidential approval ratings ==
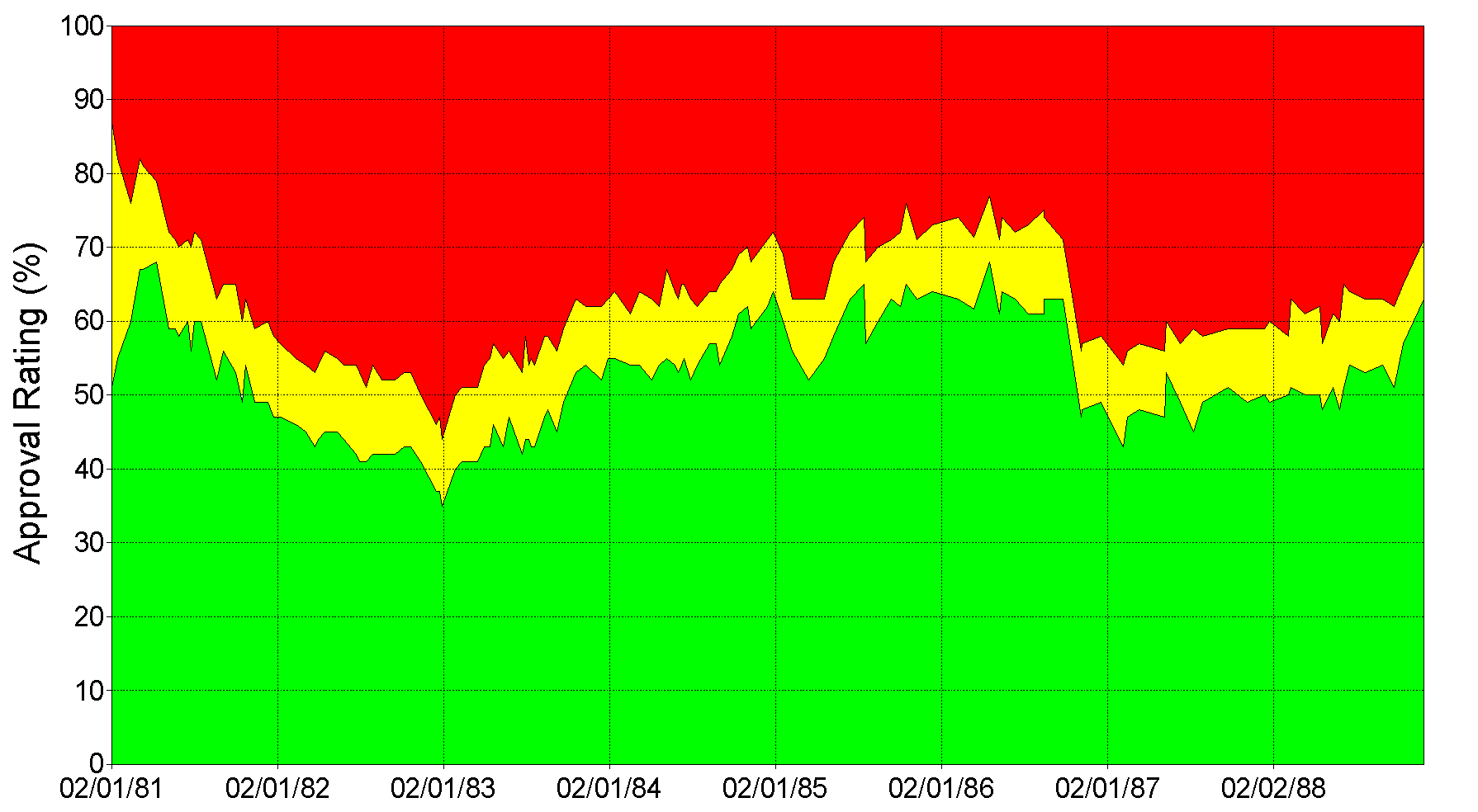
Gallup approval ratings during the Reagan presidency disapprove unsure approve

=== January 1989 ===
| Pollster | Segment | Date(s) | Approve | Disapprove | Unsure/no data | Sample | Method | Source(s) |
|---|---|---|---|---|---|---|---|---|
| CBS News/The New York Times | — | January 12–15, 1989 | 68% | 26% | 6% | — | — | |

majority approve plurality approve majority disapprove plurality disapprove

=== 1988 ===
| Pollster | Segment | Date(s) | Approve | Disapprove | Unsure/no data | Sample | Method | Source(s) |
|---|---|---|---|---|---|---|---|---|
| Gallup | — | December 27–29, 1988 | 63% | 29% | 8% | — | — | |
| Gallup | — | November 11–14, 1988 | 57% | 35% | 8% | — | — | |
| Gallup | — | October 21–24, 1988 | 51% | 38% | 11% | — | — | |
| Gallup | — | September 25–October 1, 1988 | 54% | 37% | 9% | — | — | |
| Gallup | — | August 19–22, 1988 | 53% | 37% | 10% | — | — | |
| Gallup | — | July 15–18, 1988 | 54% | 36% | 10% | — | — | |
| Gallup | — | July 1–7, 1988 | 51% | 35% | 14% | — | — | |
| Gallup | — | June 24–27, 1988 | 48% | 40% | 12% | — | — | |
| Gallup | — | June 10–13, 1988 | 51% | 39% | 10% | — | — | |
| Gallup | — | May 13–22, 1988 | 48% | 43% | 9% | — | — | |
| CBS News/The New York Times | All adults | May 9–12, 1988 | 48% | 39% | 13% | 1,382 | telephone | |
| Gallup | — | May 2–8, 1988 | 50% | 38% | 12% | — | — | |
| Gallup | — | April 8–11, 1988 | 50% | 39% | 11% | — | — | |
| Gallup | — | March 8–12, 1988 | 51% | 37% | 12% | — | — | |
| Gallup | — | March 4–6, 1988 | 50% | 42% | 8% | — | — | |
| Gallup | — | January 22–25, 1988 | 49% | 40% | 11% | — | — | |

majority approve plurality approve majority disapprove plurality disapprove

=== 1987 ===
| Pollster | Segment | Date(s) | Approve | Disapprove | Unsure/no data | Sample | Method | Source(s) |
|---|---|---|---|---|---|---|---|---|
| Gallup | — | December 4–7, 1987 | 49% | 41% | 10% | — | — | |
| Gallup | — | October 23–26, 1987 | 51% | 41% | 8% | — | — | |
| Gallup | — | August 24–September 2, 1987 | 49% | 42% | 9% | — | — | |
| Gallup | — | August 7–10, 1987 | 45% | 41% | 14% | — | — | |
| Gallup | — | July 10–13, 1987 | 49% | 43% | 8% | — | — | |
| Gallup | — | June 8–14, 1987 | 53% | 40% | 7% | — | — | |
| Gallup | — | June 5–8, 1987 | 47% | 44% | 9% | — | — | |
| Gallup | — | April 10–13, 1987 | 48% | 43% | 9% | — | — | |
| Gallup | — | March 14–18, 1987 | 47% | 44% | 9% | — | — | |
| Gallup | — | March 6–9, 1987 | 43% | 46% | 11% | — | — | |
| ABC News/The Washington Post | — | March 5–9, 1987 | 47% | 52% | 1% | — | — | |
| CBS News/The New York Times | — | February 28–March 1, 1987 | 42% | 46% | 12% | — | — | |
| Gallup | — | January 16–19, 1987 | 48% | 43% | 9% | — | — | |

majority approve plurality approve majority disapprove plurality disapprove

=== 1986 ===
| Pollster | Segment | Date(s) | Approve | Disapprove | Unsure/no data | Sample | Method | Source(s) |
|---|---|---|---|---|---|---|---|---|
| Gallup | — | December 5–8, 1986 | 48% | 43% | 9% | — | — | |
| Gallup | — | December 4–5, 1986 | 47% | 44% | 9% | — | — | |
| Gallup | — | October 24–27, 1986 | 63% | 29% | 9% | — | — | |
| Gallup | — | September 13–17, 1986 | 63% | 26% | 11% | — | — | |
| Gallup | — | September 12–15, 1986 | 61% | 25% | 14% | — | — | |
| Gallup | — | August 8–11, 1986 | 61% | 27% | 12% | — | — | |
| Gallup | — | July 11–14, 1986 | 63% | 28% | 9% | — | — | |
| Gallup | — | June 9–16, 1986 | 64% | 26% | 10% | — | — | |
| Gallup | — | June 6–9, 1986 | 61% | 29% | 10% | — | — | |
| Gallup | — | May 16–19, 1986 | 68% | 23% | 9% | — | — | |
| Gallup | — | April 11–14, 1986 | 62% | 29% | 9% | — | — | |
| Gallup | — | March 4–10, 1986 | 63% | 26% | 11% | — | — | |
| Gallup | — | January 10–13, 1986 | 64% | 27% | 9% | — | — | |

majority approve plurality approve majority disapprove plurality disapprove

=== 1985 ===
| Pollster | Segment | Date(s) | Approve | Disapprove | Unsure/no data | Sample | Method | Source(s) |
|---|---|---|---|---|---|---|---|---|
| Gallup | — | December 6–9, 1985 | 63% | 29% | 8% | — | — | |
| Gallup | — | November 11–18, 1985 | 65% | 24% | 11% | — | — | |
| Gallup | — | November 1–4, 1985 | 62% | 28% | 10% | — | — | |
| Gallup | — | October 11–14, 1985 | 63% | 29% | 8% | — | — | |
| Gallup | — | September 13–16, 1985 | 60% | 30% | 10% | — | — | |
| Gallup | — | August 16–19, 1985 | 57% | 32% | 11% | — | — | |
| Gallup | — | August 13–15, 1985 | 65% | 26% | 9% | — | — | |
| Newsweek | All adults | July 17–18, 1985 | 68% | — | — | 753 | telephone | |
| Gallup | — | July 12–15, 1985 | 63% | 28% | 9% | — | — | |
| Gallup | — | June 7–10, 1985 | 58% | 32% | 10% | — | — | |
| Gallup | — | May 17–20, 1985 | 55% | 37% | 8% | — | — | |
| Gallup | — | April 12–15, 1985 | 52% | 37% | 11% | — | — | |
| Gallup | — | March 8–11, 1985 | 56% | 37% | 7% | — | — | |
| Gallup | — | February 15–18, 1985 | 60% | 31% | 9% | — | — | |
| Gallup | — | January 25–28, 1985 | 64% | 28% | 8% | — | — | |
| ABC News/The Washington Post | — | January 11–16, 1985 | 68% | 28% | 4% | — | — | |
| Gallup | — | January 11–14, 1985 | 62% | 29% | 9% | — | — | |

majority approve plurality approve majority disapprove plurality disapprove

=== 1984 ===
| Pollster | Segment | Date(s) | Approve | Disapprove | Unsure/no data | Sample | Method | Source(s) |
|---|---|---|---|---|---|---|---|---|
| Gallup | — | December 7–10, 1984 | 59% | 32% | 9% | — | — | |
| Gallup | — | November 30–December 3, 1984 | 62% | 30% | 8% | — | — | |
| Gallup | — | November 9–12, 1984 | 61% | 31% | 8% | — | — | |
| Gallup | — | October 26–29, 1984 | 58% | 33% | 9% | — | — | |
| Gallup | — | September 28–October 1, 1984 | 54% | 35% | 11% | — | — | |
| Gallup | — | September 21–24, 1984 | 57% | 36% | 7% | — | — | |
| Gallup | — | September 7–10, 1984 | 57% | 36% | 7% | — | — | |
| Gallup | — | August 10–13, 1984 | 54% | 38% | 8% | — | — | |
| Gallup | — | July 27–30, 1984 | 52% | 37% | 11% | — | — | |
| Gallup | — | July 13–16, 1984 | 55% | 35% | 10% | — | — | |
| Gallup | — | July 6–9, 1984 | 54% | 35% | 11% | — | — | |
| Gallup | — | June 29–July 2, 1984 | 53% | 37% | 10% | — | — | |
| Gallup | — | June 22–25, 1984 | 54% | 36% | 10% | — | — | |
| Gallup | — | June 6–8, 1984 | 55% | 33% | 12% | — | — | |
| Gallup | — | May 18–21, 1984 | 54% | 38% | 8% | — | — | |
| Gallup | — | May 3–5, 1984 | 52% | 37% | 11% | — | — | |
| Gallup | — | April 6–9, 1984 | 54% | 36% | 10% | — | — | |
| Gallup | — | March 16–19, 1984 | 54% | 39% | 7% | — | — | |
| Gallup | — | February 10–13, 1984 | 55% | 36% | 9% | — | — | |
| Gallup | — | January 27–30, 1984 | 55% | 37% | 8% | — | — | |
| Gallup | — | January 13–16, 1984 | 52% | 38% | 10% | — | — | |

majority approve plurality approve majority disapprove plurality disapprove

=== 1983 ===
| Pollster | Segment | Date(s) | Approve | Disapprove | Unsure/no data | Sample | Method | Source(s) |
|---|---|---|---|---|---|---|---|---|
| Gallup | — | December 9–12, 1983 | 54% | 38% | 8% | — | — | |
| Gallup | — | November 18–21, 1983 | 53% | 37% | 10% | — | — | |
| Gallup | — | October 21–24, 1983 | 49% | 41% | 10% | — | — | |
| Gallup | — | October 7–10, 1983 | 45% | 44% | 11% | — | — | |
| Gallup | — | September 16–19, 1983 | 47% | 43% | 10% | — | — | |
| Gallup | — | September 9–12, 1983 | 47% | 42% | 11% | — | — | |
| Gallup | — | August 19–22, 1983 | 43% | 46% | 11% | — | — | |
| Gallup | — | August 12–15, 1983 | 43% | 45% | 12% | — | — | |
| Gallup | — | August 5–8, 1983 | 44% | 46% | 10% | — | — | |
| Gallup | — | July 29–August 1, 1983 | 44% | 42% | 14% | — | — | |
| Gallup | — | July 22–25, 1983 | 42% | 47% | 11% | — | — | |
| Gallup | — | June 24–27, 1983 | 47% | 44% | 9% | — | — | |
| Gallup | — | June 10–13, 1983 | 43% | 45% | 12% | — | — | |
| Gallup | — | May 20–23, 1983 | 46% | 43% | 11% | — | — | |
| Gallup | — | May 13–16, 1983 | 43% | 45% | 12% | — | — | |
| Gallup | — | April 29–May 2, 1983 | 43% | 46% | 11% | — | — | |
| Gallup | — | April 15–18, 1983 | 41% | 49% | 10% | — | — | |
| Gallup | — | March 11–14, 1983 | 41% | 49% | 10% | — | — | |
| Gallup | — | February 25–28, 1983 | 40% | 50% | 10% | — | — | |
| Gallup | — | January 28–31, 1983 | 35% | 56% | 9% | — | — | |
| Gallup | — | January 21–24, 1983 | 37% | 53% | 10% | — | — | |
| Gallup | — | January 14–17, 1983 | 37% | 54% | 9% | — | — | |

majority approve plurality approve majority disapprove plurality disapprove

=== 1982 ===
| Pollster | Segment | Date(s) | Approve | Disapprove | Unsure/no data | Sample | Method | Source(s) |
|---|---|---|---|---|---|---|---|---|
| Gallup | — | December 10–13, 1982 | 41% | 50% | 9% | — | — | |
| Gallup | — | November 19–22, 1982 | 43% | 47% | 10% | — | — | |
| Gallup | — | November 5–8, 1982 | 43% | 47% | 10% | — | — | |
| Gallup | — | October 15–18, 1982 | 42% | 48% | 10% | — | — | |
| Gallup | — | September 17–20, 1982 | 42% | 48% | 10% | — | — | |
| Gallup | — | August 27–30, 1982 | 42% | 46% | 12% | — | — | |
| Gallup | — | August 13–16, 1982 | 41% | 49% | 10% | — | — | |
| Gallup | — | July 30–August 2, 1982 | 41% | 47% | 12% | — | — | |
| Gallup | — | July 23–26, 1982 | 42% | 46% | 12% | — | — | |
| Gallup | — | June 25–28, 1982 | 44% | 46% | 10% | — | — | |
| Gallup | — | June 11–14, 1982 | 45% | 45% | 10% | — | — | |
| CBS News/The New York Times | All adults | May 19–23, 1982 | 43% | — | — | 1,470 | telephone | |
| Gallup | — | May 14–17, 1982 | 45% | 44% | 11% | — | — | |
| Gallup | — | April 30–May 3, 1982 | 44% | 46% | 10% | — | — | |
| Gallup | — | April 23–26, 1982 | 43% | 47% | 10% | — | — | |
| Gallup | — | April 2–5, 1982 | 45% | 46% | 9% | — | — | |
| Gallup | — | March 12–15, 1982 | 46% | 45% | 9% | — | — | |
| Gallup | — | February 5–8, 1982 | 47% | 43% | 10% | — | — | |
| Gallup | — | January 22–25, 1982 | 47% | 42% | 11% | — | — | |
| Gallup | — | January 8–11, 1982 | 49% | 40% | 11% | — | — | |

majority approve plurality approve majority disapprove plurality disapprove

=== 1981 ===
| Pollster | Segment | Date(s) | Approve | Disapprove | Unsure/no data | Sample | Method | Source(s) |
|---|---|---|---|---|---|---|---|---|
| Gallup | — | December 11–14, 1981 | 49% | 41% | 10% | — | — | |
| Gallup | — | November 20–23, 1981 | 54% | 37% | 9% | — | — | |
| Gallup | — | November 13–16, 1981 | 49% | 40% | 11% | — | — | |
| Gallup | — | October 30–November 2, 1981 | 53% | 35% | 12% | — | — | |
| Gallup | — | October 2–5, 1981 | 56% | 35% | 9% | — | — | |
| Gallup | — | September 18–21, 1981 | 52% | 37% | 11% | — | — | |
| Gallup | — | August 14–17, 1981 | 60% | 29% | 11% | — | — | |
| Gallup | — | July 31–August 3, 1981 | 60% | 28% | 12% | — | — | |
| Gallup | — | July 24–27, 1981 | 56% | 30% | 14% | — | — | |
| Gallup | — | July 17–20, 1981 | 60% | 29% | 11% | — | — | |
| Gallup | — | June 26–29, 1981 | 58% | 30% | 12% | — | — | |
| Gallup | — | June 19–22, 1981 | 59% | 29% | 12% | — | — | |
| Gallup | — | June 5–8, 1981 | 59% | 28% | 13% | — | — | |
| Gallup | — | May 8–11, 1981 | 68% | 21% | 11% | — | — | |
| Gallup | — | April 10–13, 1981 | 67% | 19% | 14% | — | — | |
| Gallup | — | April 3–6, 1981 | 67% | 18% | 15% | — | — | |
| ABC News/The Washington Post | — | March 25–29, 1981 | 62% | 23% | 15% | — | — | |
| ABC News/The Washington Post | — | March 31, 1981 | 73% | 16% | 11% | 505 | telephone | |
| Gallup | — | March 13–16, 1981 | 60% | 24% | 16% | — | — | |
| Gallup | — | February 13–16, 1981 | 55% | 18% | 27% | — | — | |
| Gallup | — | January 30–February 2, 1981 | 51% | 13% | 36% | — | — | |

majority approve plurality approve majority disapprove plurality disapprove

== See also ==
- Ronald Reagan 1980 presidential campaign
- Ronald Reagan 1984 presidential campaign
- Nationwide opinion polling for the 1980 United States presidential election
