= Nationwide opinion polling for the 1980 United States presidential election =

This article provides a list of scientific, nationwide public opinion polls that were conducted relating to the 1980 United States presidential election.

== Presidential election ==
=== Ronald Reagan vs Jimmy Carter ===
Poll source	Date(s) administered	Ronald Reagan (R)	Jimmy Carter (D)	John Anderson (I)	Other	Undecided	Margin
Gallup	March 31 – April 3, 1978	46%	50%	-	1%	3%	4
ABC-Harris	May 14–20 (Note: Date is approximate), 1978	47%	46%	-	-	7%	1
Gallup	July 7–10, 1978	43%	52%	-	1%	4%	9
Gallup	December 8–11, 1978	35%	57%	-	2%	5%	22
ABC-Harris	December 21–26, 1978	38%	55%	-	-	7%	17
Gallup	March 23–26, 1979	38%	52%	-	3%	7%	14
ABC-Harris	March, 1979	46%	49%	-	-	5%	3
ABC-Harris	May, 1979	45%	47%	-	-	8%	2
ABC-Harris	June, 1979	51%	43%	-	-	6%	8
Gallup	June 22–25, 1979	49%	45%	-	1%	5%	4
Gallup	July 13–15, 1979	52%	42%	-	2%	4%	10
ABC-Harris	July 28–29, 1979	51%	44%	-	-	5%	7
Gallup	August 3–6, 1979	42%	47%	-	4%	7%	5
ABC-Harris	September 1–5, 1979	50%	45%	-	-	5%	5
Gallup	September 7–10, 1979	46%	47%	-	2%	5%	1
ABC-Harris	September 26 – October 1, 1979	45%	52%	-	-	3%	7
Gallup	October 12–15, 1979	42%	48%	-	3%	7%	6
ABC-Harris	November 7–10, 1979	42%	53%	-	-	5%	11
Gallup	November 16–19, 1979	41%	53%	-	1%	5%	12
Gallup	December 7–9, 1979	36%	60%	-	1%	3%	24
ABC-Harris	December 14–16, 1979	36%	59%	-	-	5%	23
Gallup	January 4–6, 1980	32%	63%	-	1%	4%	31
ABC-Harris	January 22, 1980	31%	65%	-	-	4%	34
Gallup	February 1–3, 1980	32%	59%	-	3%	6%	27
ABC-Harris	January 31 – February 4, 1980	32%	64%	-	-	4%	32
Gallup	February 29 – March 2, 1980	34%	57%	-	3%	6%	23
ABC-Harris	March 5–8, 1980	40%	58%	-	-	2%	18
ABC-Harris	March 13–15, 1980	40%	55%	-	-	5%	15
ABC-Harris	March 26–30, 1980	47%	50%	-	-	3%	3
Gallup	March 28–30, 1980	43%	48%	-	2%	7%	5
Gallup	March 28–30, 1980	34%	39%	21%	1%	5%	5
ABC-Harris	April 8, 1980	48%	45%	-	-	7%	3
ABC-Harris	April 8, 1980	38%	38%	22%	-	1%	0
Gallup	April 11–13, 1980	44%	49%	-	1%	6%	5
Gallup	April 11–13, 1980	34%	41%	18%	1%	6%	7
ABC-Harris	April 25, 1980	42%	33%	19%	-	6%	9
Gallup	April 26–27, 1980	43%	47%	-	-	10%	4
Gallup	April 26–27, 1980	35%	40%	19%	-	6%	5
ABC-Harris	April 26–30, 1980	39%	33%	23%	-	5%	6
Gallup	May 2–5, 1980	40%	47%	-	-	13%	7
Gallup	May 2–5, 1980	33%	38%	21%	-	7%	5
Gallup	May 16–18, 1980	41%	49%	-	-	10%	8
Gallup	May 16–18, 1980	32%	40%	21%	-	7%	8
Gallup	May 30 – June 2, 1980	39%	50%	-	-	11%	11
Gallup	May 30 – June 2, 1980	32%	39%	21%	-	8%	7
ABC-Harris	June 5–9, 1980	51%	44%	-	-	5%	7
ABC-Harris	June 5–9, 1980	39%	34%	24%	-	3%	5
Gallup	June 13–16, 1980	45%	42%	-	-	13%	3
Gallup	June 13–16, 1980	33%	35%	24%	-	8%	2
Gallup	June 27–30, 1980	47%	41%	-	-	12%	6
Gallup	June 27–30, 1980	37%	32%	22%	-	9%	5
Gallup	July 11–14, 1980	37%	34%	21%	-	8%	3
Gallup	July 11–13, 1980	43% (Note: With George Bush)	34% (Note: With Walter Mondale)	16%	-	7%	9
July 14–17: Republican National Convention
ABC-Harris	July 18–21, 1980	61%	33%	-	-	6%	28
ABC-Harris	July 18–21, 1980	49%	23%	25%	-	3%	24
Gallup	August 1–3, 1980	45%	31% (Note: With Walter Mondale)	14%	-	10%	14
ABC-Harris	August 5–6, 1980	57%	36%	-	-	7%	21
ABC-Harris	August 5–6, 1980	48%	28%	19%	-	5%	20
August 11–14: Democratic National Convention
Gallup	August 15–17, 1980	40%	46%	-	-	14%	6
Gallup	August 15–17, 1980	39%	38%	14%	1%	8%	1
ABC-Harris	August 14–18, 1980	42%	36%	17%	-	5%	6
Gallup	August 15–18, 1980	38%	39%	13%	-	10%	1
ABC-Harris	September 3–7, 1980	41%	37%	17%	-	5%	4
Gallup	September 12–15, 1980	41%	37%	15%	-	7%	4
ABC-Harris	September 22, 1980	42%	36%	19%	-	3%	6
ABC-Harris	September 22, 1980	48%	46%	-	-	6%	2
ABC-Harris	October 3–6, 1980	43%	39%	14%	-	4%	4
Gallup	October 10–12, 1980	45%	42%	8%	-	5%	3
ABC-Harris	October 14–16, 1980	42%	39%	12%	-	7%	3
Gallup	October 17–20, 1980	40%	41%	10%	-	9%	1
ABC-Harris	October 22–25, 1980	45%	42%	10%	-	3%	3
Washington Post	October 26–27, 1980	43%	39%	7%	-	11%	4
Newsweek-Gallup	October 29–30, 1980	44%	43%	7%	1%	5%	4
ABC-Harris	October 30 – November 1, 1980	45%	40%	10%	1%	4%	5
CBS-New York Times	October 30 – November 1, 1980	44%	43%	8%	-	5%	1
Gallup	October 30 – November 1, 1980	46%	43%	7%	1%	3%	3
Election Results	Nov. 4, 1980	50.75%	41.01%	6.61%	1.63%	-	9.74

== Hypothetical Polling ==
=== Ronald Reagan vs Edward Kennedy ===
Poll source	Date(s) administered	Ronald Reagan (R)	Edward Kennedy (D)	John Anderson (I)	Other	Undecided	Margin
ABC-Harris	May 14–20 (Note: Date is approximate), 1978	42%	54%	-	-	4%	12
Gallup	May 19–22, 1978	36%	56%	-	1%	7%	20
Gallup	July 7–10, 1978	36%	59%	-	1%	4%	23
ABC-Harris	December 21–26, 1978	39%	55%	-	-	6%	16
ABC-Harris	March, 1979	38%	58%	-	-	4%	20
Gallup	May 18–21, 1979	35%	56%	-	3%	6%	21
Gallup	July 13–15, 1979	38%	56%	-	2%	4%	18
ABC-Harris	July 28–29, 1979	36%	59%	-	-	5%	23
Gallup	August 3–6, 1979	32%	61%	-	3%	4%	29
ABC-Harris	September 1–5, 1979	39%	58%	-	-	3%	19
Gallup	September 7–10, 1979	33%	61%	-	2%	4%	28
ABC-Harris	September 26 – October 1, 1979	34%	64%	-	-	2%	30
Gallup	October 12–15, 1979	38%	54%	-	2%	6%	16
ABC-Harris	November 7–10, 1979	38%	58%	-	-	4%	20
Gallup	December 7–9, 1979	44%	49%	-	2%	5%	5
ABC-Harris	December 14–16, 1979	49%	46%	-	-	5%	3
Gallup	January 4–6, 1980	42%	50%	-	2%	6%	8
Gallup	February 1–3, 1980	48%	39%	-	6%	7%	9
Gallup	February 29 – March 3, 1980	53%	34%	-	-	13%	19
Gallup	May 16–19, 1980	51%	38%	-	-	11%	13
Gallup	June 13–15, 1980	58%	32%	-	-	10%	26
Gallup	August 1–3, 1980	48%	27%	18%	-	7%	21

=== Ronald Reagan vs Jerry Brown ===
Poll source	Date(s) administered	Ronald Reagan (R)	Jerry Brown (D)	Other	Undecided	Margin
ABC-Lou Harris	May 14–20 (Note: Date is approximate), 1978	52%	40%	-	8%	12

=== Ronald Reagan vs Scoop Jackson ===
Poll source	Date(s) administered	Ronald Reagan (R)	Scoop Jackson (D)	John Anderson (I)	Other	Undecided	Margin
Gallup	August 1–3, 1980	46%	21%	20%	-	13%	25

=== Ronald Reagan vs Walter Mondale ===
Poll source	Date(s) administered	Ronald Reagan (R)	Walter Mondale (D)	John Anderson (I)	Other	Undecided	Margin
Gallup	August 1–3, 1980	47%	27%	18%	-	8%	20

=== Ronald Reagan vs Edmund Muskie ===
Poll source	Date(s) administered	Ronald Reagan (R)	Edmund Muskie (D)	John Anderson (I)	Other	Undecided	Margin
ABC-Harris	June 5–9, 1980	48%	48%	-	4%	0	
Gallup	August 1–3, 1980	45%	31%	16%	-	8%	14

=== George Bush vs Jimmy Carter ===
Poll source	Date(s) administered	George Bush (R)	Jimmy Carter (D)	Other	Undecided	Margin
ABC-Harris	January 22, 1980	32%	62%	-	6%	30
Gallup	February 1–3, 1980	35%	54%	2%	9%	19
Gallup	February 29 – March 2, 1980	32%	57%	-	11%	25

=== George Bush vs Edward Kennedy ===
Poll source	Date(s) administered	George Bush (R)	Edward Kennedy (D)	Other	Undecided	Margin
Gallup	February 1–3, 1980	52%	37%	3%	8%	15

=== Howard Baker vs Jimmy Carter ===
Poll source	Date(s) administered	Howard Baker (R)	Jimmy Carter (D)	Other	Undecided	Margin
ABC-Harris	June, 1979	46%	45%	-	9%	1
Gallup	July 13–15, 1979	47%	44%	1%	8%	3
ABC-Harris	July 28–29, 1979	48%	43%	-	9%	5

=== Howard Baker vs Edward Kennedy ===
Poll source	Date(s) administered	Howard Baker (R)	Edward Kennedy (D)	Other	Undecided	Margin
Gallup	July 13–15, 1979	36%	57%	2%	5%	21
ABC-Harris	July 28–29, 1979	34%	60%	-	6%	26

=== John Connally vs Jimmy Carter ===
Poll source	Date(s) administered	John Connally (R)	Jimmy Carter (D)	Other	Undecided	Margin
Gallup	February 2–5, 1979	33%	53%	3%	11%	20
ABC-Harris	June, 1979	41%	52%	-	7%	11
Gallup	June 22–25, 1979	38%	53%	1%	8%	15
Gallup	July 13–15, 1979	43%	49%	3%	5%	6
ABC-Harris	July 28–29, 1979	40%	52%	-	8%	12

=== John Connally vs Edward Kennedy ===
Poll source	Date(s) administered	John Connally (R)	Edward Kennedy (D)	Other	Undecided	Margin
Gallup	May 18–21, 1979	24%	63%	3%	10%	39
Gallup	June 22–25, 1979	25%	67%	1%	7%	42
Gallup	July 13–15, 1979	30%	62%	3%	5%	32

=== Gerald Ford vs Jimmy Carter ===
Poll source	Date(s) administered	Gerald Ford (R)	Jimmy Carter (D)	Other	Undecided	Margin
Gallup	March 31 – April 3, 1978	45%	51%	1%	3%	6
ABC-Harris	April, 1978	42%	50%	-	8%	8
ABC-Harris	May 14–20 (Note: Date is approximate), 1978	48%	43%	-	9%	5
Gallup	July 7–10, 1978	46%	47%	2%	5%	1
Gallup	September 22–25, 1978	40%	53%	2%	5%	13
Gallup	December 8–11, 1978	39%	53%	3%	5%	14
Gallup	March 23–26, 1979	41%	48%	4%	7%	7
Gallup	June 22–25, 1979	50%	43%	1%	6%	7
Gallup	July 13–15, 1979	55%	40%	2%	3%	15
Gallup	August 3–6, 1979	48%	42%	4%	6%	6
Gallup	September 7–10, 1979	51%	42%	3%	4%	9
ABC-Harris	September 26 – October 1, 1979	55%	42%	-	3%	13
Gallup	October 12–15, 1979	47%	41%	4%	8%	6
ABC-Harris	November 7–10, 1979	50%	46%	-	4%	4
Gallup	December 7–9, 1979	39%	57%	1%	3%	18
Gallup	January 4–6, 1980	38%	57%	1%	4%	19
Gallup	February 1–3, 1980	41%	52%	2%	5%	11
ABC-Harris	March 5–8, 1980	44%	54%	-	2%	10

=== Gerald Ford vs Edward Kennedy ===
Poll source	Date(s) administered	Gerald Ford (R)	Edward Kennedy (D)	Other	Undecided	Margin
ABC-Harris	May 14–20 (Note: Date is approximate), 1978	43%	52%	-	5%	9
Gallup	May 19–22, 1978	41%	51%	1%	7%	10
Gallup	July 7–10, 1978	40%	57%	-	3%	17
Gallup	May 18–21, 1979	38%	52%	4%	6%	14
Gallup	July 13–15, 1979	41%	54%	2%	3%	13
Gallup	August 3–6, 1979	35%	57%	3%	5%	22
Gallup	September 7–10, 1979	38%	58%	1%	3%	20
ABC-Harris	September 26 – October 1, 1979	40%	58%	-	2%	18
Gallup	October 12–15, 1979	42%	51%	2%	5%	9
Gallup	December 7–9, 1979	51%	43%	1%	5%	8
Gallup	January 4–6, 1980	49%	44%	2%	5%	5
Gallup	February 1–3, 1980	57%	34%	3%	6%	23

=== Gerald Ford vs Jerry Brown ===
Poll source	Date(s) administered	Gerald Ford (R)	Jerry Brown (D)	Other	Undecided	Margin
ABC-Harris	May 14–20 (Note: Date is approximate), 1978	52%	38%	-	10%	14
