= Statewide opinion polling for the 2020 Democratic Party presidential primaries =

This is a list of statewide public opinion polls that have been conducted relating to the Democratic primaries for the 2020 United States presidential election. The persons named in the polls are declared candidates or have received media speculation about their possible candidacy.

Given the large number of potential candidates, the scores of certain low-polling and infrequently-polled candidates have been combined within the "other" column; their exact scores may be viewed by viewing the footnotes associated with each poll. The polls included are among Democrats or Democrats and Democratic-leaning independents, and do not include Republican-leaning independents. The statewide polls are ordered by the scheduled date of the state's primary or caucus. Open-ended polls are included and marked with an asterisk (*), but closed-ended versions of such polls are listed where possible. If multiple versions of polls are provided, the version used for debate qualification is prioritized, then the version among likely voters, then registered voters, then adults.

Key: Joe Biden Bernie Sanders Michael Bloomberg Elizabeth Warren 3 or more candidates statistically tied for the lead No polling data in the past three months or three months before the election

== Background ==
The Democratic National Committee has determined that candidates may qualify for the first two Democratic primary debates either by polling at 1% or higher in at least three national or early-state (Iowa, New Hampshire, Nevada, and South Carolina) polls sponsored or conducted by designated organizations (in different regions if by the same organization) published after January 1, 2019, up until June 12, 2019, or by a fundraising threshold requiring at least 65,000 unique donors with at least 200 in 20 different states. Should more than 20 candidates meet either threshold, then candidates meeting both thresholds will be given highest priority for entry into the debates, followed by those with the highest polling average and those with the most donors. The pollsters and sponsors of polls designated for consideration by the DNC are the Associated Press, ABC News, CBS News, CNN, The Des Moines Register, Fox News, the Las Vegas Review-Journal, Monmouth University, NBC News, The New York Times, National Public Radio, Quinnipiac University, Reuters, the University of New Hampshire, USA Today, The Wall Street Journal, The Washington Post, and Winthrop University. Open-ended polls do not count towards the polling threshold.

For the third and fourth primary debates, candidates will be required to meet both polling and fundraising thresholds, with the prior considering only polls between June 28 and August 28, 2019, and increased to 4 qualifying polls at 2% support, now excluding surveys sponsored by the Las Vegas Review-Journal and Reuters; the latter requirement has also been increased, to 130,000 unique donors with at least 400 in 20 different states.

Individuals who have been included in national Democratic primary polls but have either ruled out their candidacy or not expressed interest in running include Stacey Abrams, Michael Avenatti, Sherrod Brown, Hillary Clinton, Mark Cuban, Andrew Cuomo, Al Franken, Eric Garcetti, Tim Kaine, Jason Kander, Joe Kennedy III, John Kerry, Mitch Landrieu, Terry McAuliffe, Chris Murphy, Gavin Newsom, Michelle Obama, Howard Schultz, Oprah Winfrey, and Mark Zuckerberg.

== Polling in the four early primary states ==
The following Morning Consult weekly poll archive graph depicts the evolution of the standing of each candidate in the early primary states (Iowa, New Hampshire, Nevada and South Carolina) since February 2019.

== Polling for Super Tuesday ==
The following Morning Consult graph depicts the evolution of the standing of each candidate in the March 3, 2020 Super Tuesday states (Alabama, Arkansas, California, Colorado, Maine, Massachusetts, Minnesota, North Carolina, Oklahoma, Tennessee, Texas, Utah, Vermont, and Virginia) since January 7, 2020.

== Primary and caucus calendar ==
Democratic primary and caucus calendar by scheduled date February March 3 (Super Tuesday) March 10 March 14–17 March 24–29 April 4–17 April 28 May June–August

The following dates reflect either the confirmed or expected dates of Democratic primaries and caucuses in 2020. Those for contests in U.S. territories with no date yet set are based on dates estimated by The Green Papers based on past years. The pledged delegate numbers listed below are based on the presidential votes in 2008, 2012, and 2016, as well as the number of electoral votes of each state in 2020. The number of DNC members and distinguished party leaders in the count of unpledged PLEO (party leaders and elected officials) delegates is based on the 2016 Democratic National Convention, while the number of unpledged officeholders (governors, members of Congress, and their equivalents in non-state jurisdictions) reflects their current total. The numbers of pledged delegates do not yet account for delegate bonuses or penalties from timing or clustering.

States listed with a lavender background and an asterisk (*) do not yet have a date set by existing statute. States with a light yellow background and a dagger (†) are set to shift their primary or caucus date following the expected passage of legislation moving the dates of their contests. If not already listed as such, the date to which the contest is expected to be moved is listed in parentheses. Party-run primaries (also described as either a firehouse primary or caucus in some jurisdictions) are listed with two asterisks (**).

2020 Democratic Primaries and Caucuses
Date	State/territory	Type	Eligibility	P	U	T
Feb 3	Iowa	Caucus	Closed	41	8	49
Feb 11	New Hampshire	Primary	Mixed	24	9	33
Feb 22	Nevada	Caucus	Closed	36	12	48
Feb 29	South Carolina	Primary	Open	54	9	63
Mar 3	Alabama	Primary	Open	52	9	61
Mar 3	American Samoa*	Caucus	Open	6	5	11
Mar 3	Arkansas	Primary	Open	31	5	36
Mar 3	California	Primary	Mixed	416	79	495
Mar 3	Colorado	Primary	Mixed	67	13	80
Mar 3	Maine	Primary	Closed	24	8	32
Mar 3	Massachusetts	Primary	Mixed	91	23	114
Mar 3	Minnesota	Primary	Closed	75	17	92
Mar 3	North Carolina	Primary	Mixed	110	12	122
Mar 3	Oklahoma	Primary	Mixed	37	5	42
Mar 3	Tennessee	Primary	Open	64	9	73
Mar 3	Texas	Primary	Closed	228	34	262
Mar 3	Utah	Primary	Mixed	29	6	35
Mar 3	Vermont	Primary	Open	16	7	23
Mar 3	Virginia	Primary	Open	99	25	124
Mar 3–10	Democrats Abroad	Caucus**	Open	13	4	17
Mar 10	Idaho	Primary	Closed	20	5	25
Mar 10	Michigan	Primary	Open	125	22	147
Mar 10	Mississippi	Primary	Open	36	5	41
Mar 10	Missouri	Primary	Open	68	10	78
Mar 10	North Dakota	Caucus**	Open	14	4	18
Mar 10	Washington	Primary	Closed	89	18	107
Mar 14	Northern Marianas*	Caucus	Closed	6	5	11
Mar 17	Arizona	Primary	Closed	67	11	78
Mar 17	Florida	Primary	Closed	219	29	248
Mar 17	Illinois	Primary	Open	155	29	184
Apr 7	Wisconsin	Primary	Open	84	13	90
Apr 10	Alaska	Primary**	Closed	15	4	18
Apr 17	Wyoming	Caucus	Closed	13	4	17
Apr 28	Ohio	Primary	Mixed	136	17	153
May 2	Guam*	Caucus	Closed	7	5	11
May 2	Kansas	Primary**	Closed	39	6	39
May 12	Nebraska	Primary	Mixed	29	4	29
May 19	Oregon	Primary	Closed	61	14	66
May 22	Hawaii	Primary**	Closed	24	9	31
Jun 2	Delaware	Primary	Closed	21	11	28
Jun 2	District of Columbia†	Primary	Closed	20	26	43
Jun 2	Indiana	Primary	Open	82	7	77
Jun 2	Maryland	Primary	Closed	96	23	102
Jun 2	Montana	Primary	Open	19	6	22
Jun 2	New Mexico	Primary	Closed	34	11	40
Jun 2	Pennsylvania	Primary	Closed	186	23	176
Jun 2	Rhode Island	Primary	Mixed	26	9	30
Jun 2	South Dakota	Primary	Mixed	16	5	19
Jun 6	Virgin Islands*	Caucus	Closed	7	6	13
Jun 9	Georgia	Primary	Open	105	15	120
Jun 9	West Virginia	Primary	Mixed	28	6	30
Jun 23	Kentucky	Primary	Closed	54	6	52
Jun 23	New York†	Primary	Closed	273	46	270
Jul 7	New Jersey	Primary	Mixed	126	21	128
Jul 11	Louisiana	Primary	Closed	54	7	57
Jul 12	Puerto Rico	Primary	Open	51	8	59
Aug 11	Connecticut	Primary	Closed	60	15	64
N/A	Unassigned	–	–	–	1	1
Total delegates				3,979	765	4,744

== Iowa caucus ==
The Iowa Democratic caucus was held on February 3, 2020.

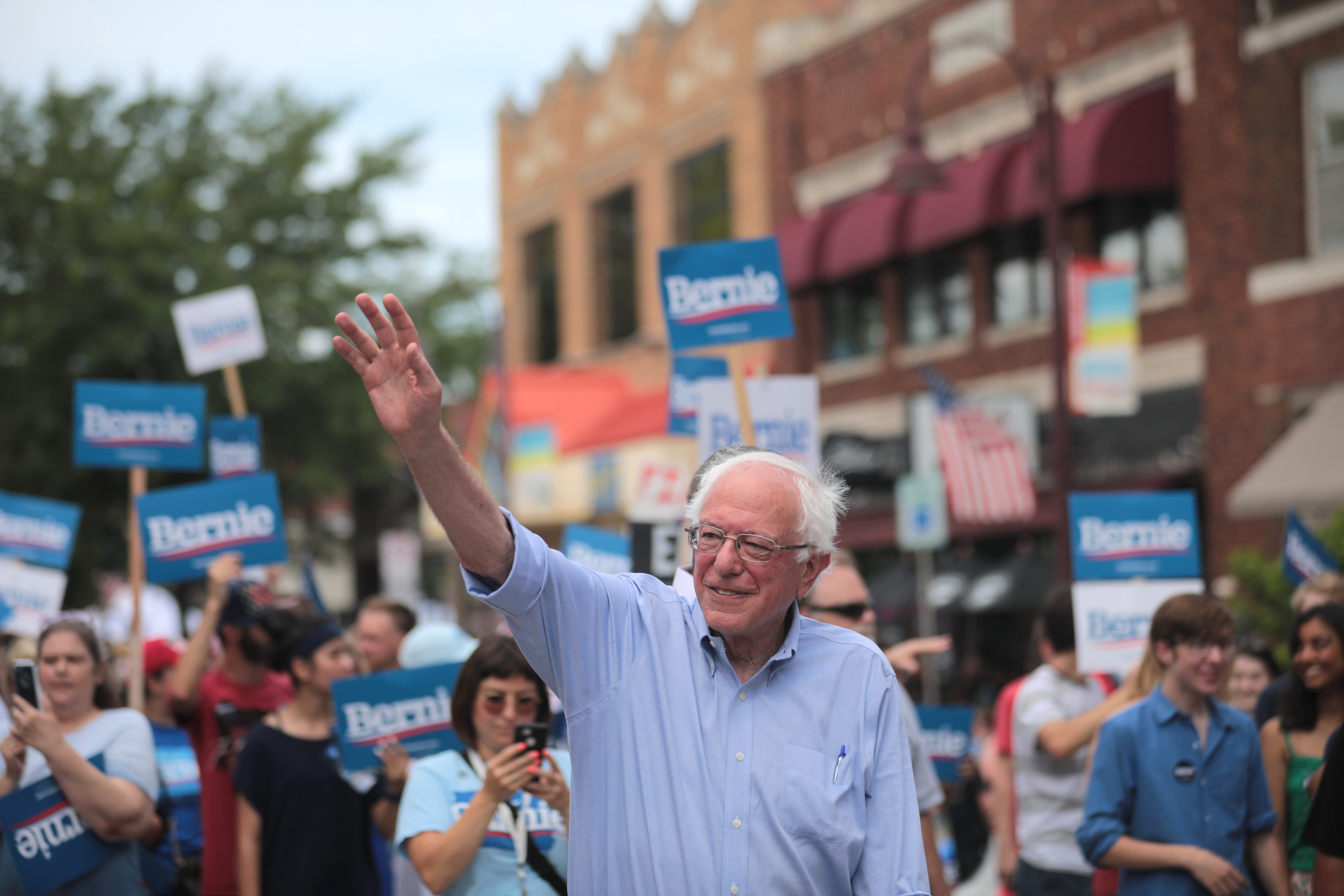
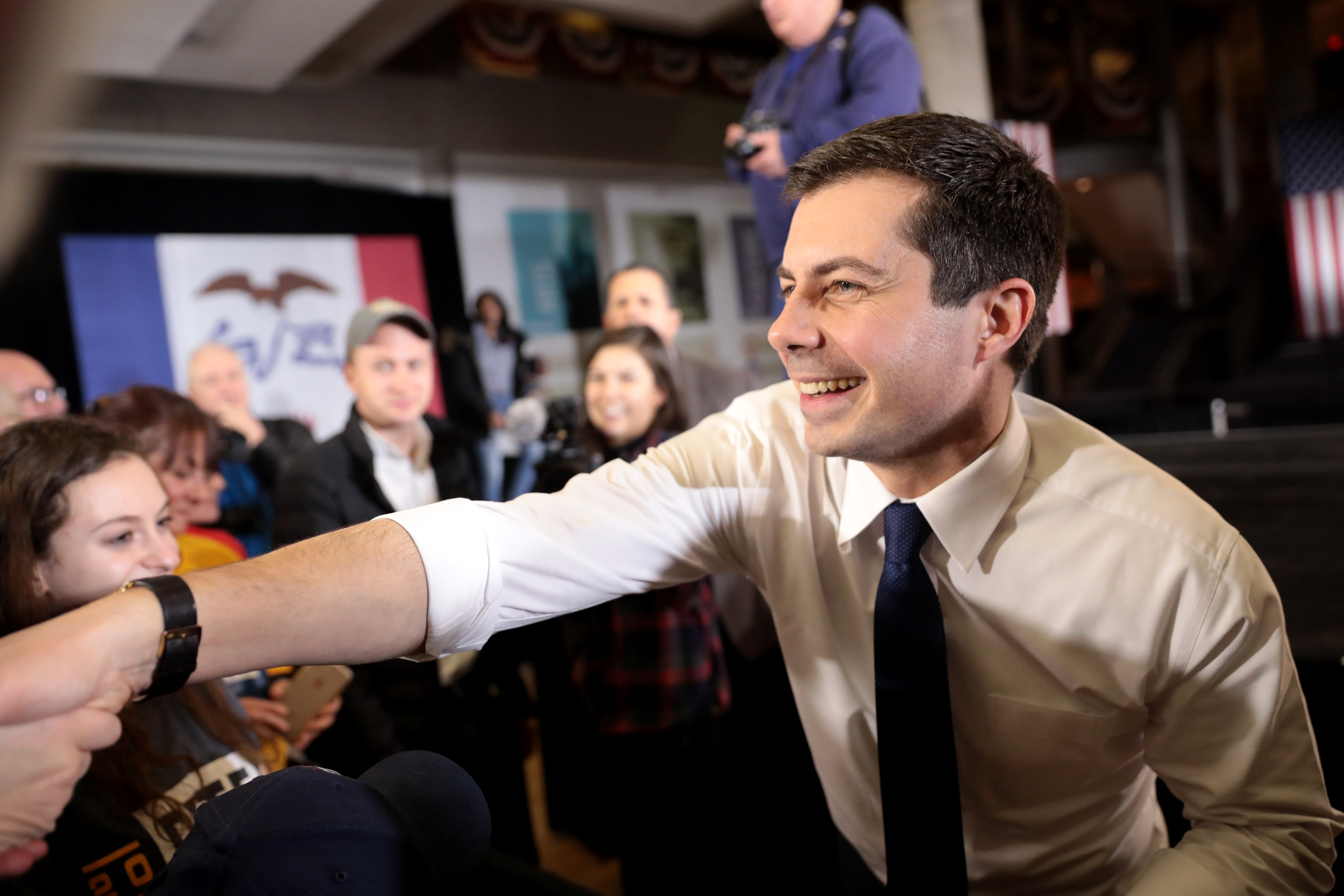
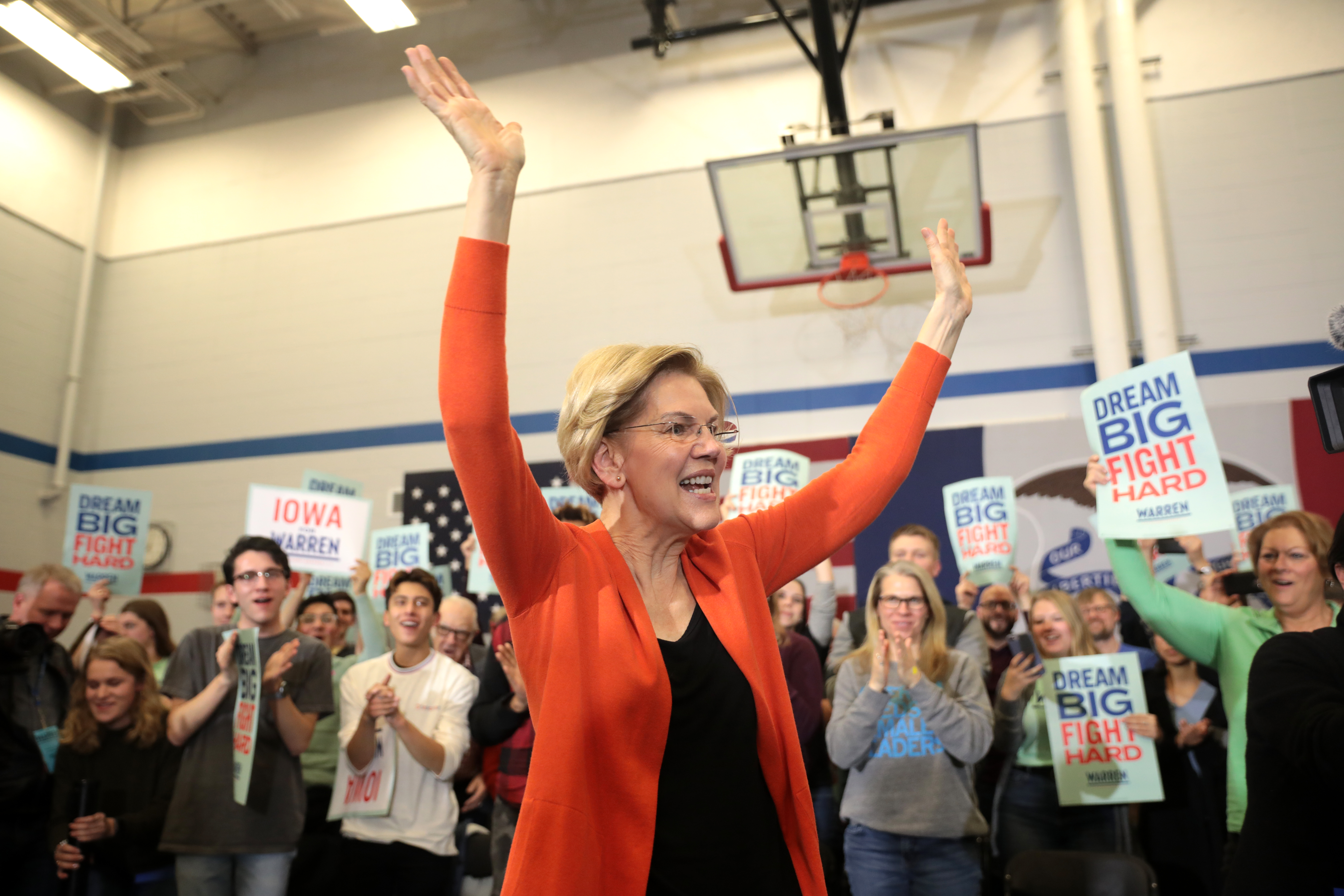
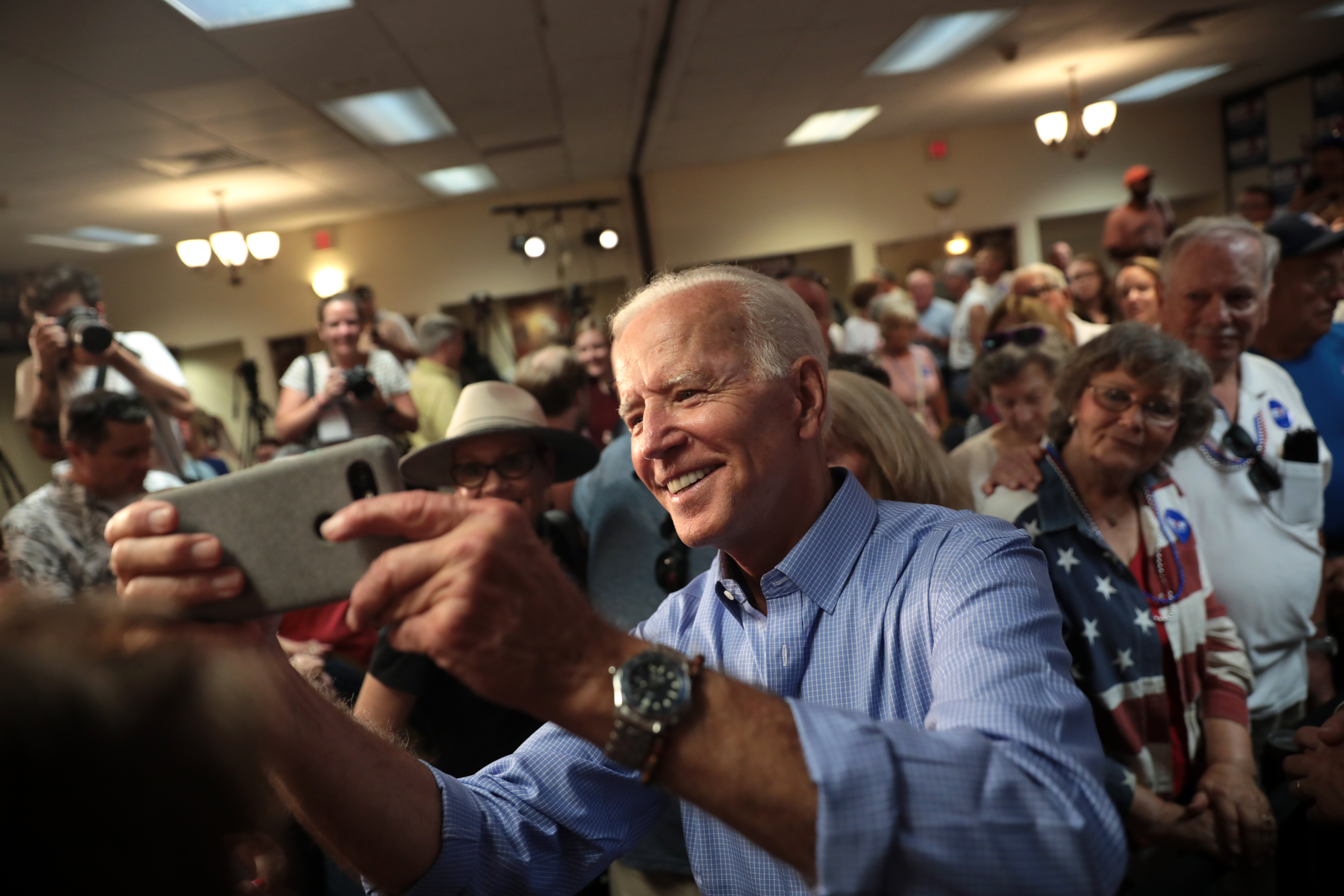
Sanders, Buttigieg, Warren and Biden campaigning in Iowa throughout the lead up to the caucus

Polling aggregation
Source of poll aggregation	Date updated	Dates polled	Bernie Sanders	Joe Biden	Pete Buttigieg	Elizabeth Warren	Amy Klobuchar	Andrew Yang	Tom Steyer	Other	Un- decided (Note: Calculated by taking the difference of 100% and all other candidates combined)
270 to Win	Feb 3, 2020	Jan 22 – Feb 2, 2020	22.6%	18.2%	15.2%	15.6%	11.8%	3.8%	3.6%	3.6% (Note: Gabbard with 1.8%; Bloomberg with 1.3%; Bennet with 0.5%; Patrick not reported)	5.6%
RealClear Politics	Feb 3, 2020	Jan 20 – Feb 2, 2020	23.0%	19.3%	16.8%	15.5%	9.0%	3.3%	3.0%	2.5% (Note: Gabbard with 1.5%; Bloomberg with 1.0%; Bennet and Patrick not reported)	7.6%
FiveThirtyEight	Feb 3, 2020	until Feb 2, 2020 (Note: FiveThirtyEight aggregates polls with a trendline regression of polls rather than a strict average of recent polls.)	22.2%	20.7%	15.7%	14.5%	10.1%	3.7%	3.6%	2.9% (Note: Gabbard and Bloomberg with 1.2%; Bennet with 0.4%; Patrick with 0.1%)	6.6%
Average			22.6%	19.4%	15.9%	15.2%	10.3%	3.6%	3.4%	3.0% (Note: Gabbard with 1.5%; Bloomberg with 1.2%; Bennet with 0.3%; Patrick with 0.0%)	6.6%

The results of a final poll from The Des Moines Register were not released as scheduled on February 1, after an interviewee complained that Pete Buttigieg was not given as a poll option during their interview, with the omission reportedly attributed to human error. As the polling firm was unable to determine whether the mistake was an isolated incident or not, pollster Ann Selzer decided to withhold the results of the poll altogether, marking the first time in 76 years that the final pre-caucus poll was not released by the Register. The poll was later leaked on Twitter, with results confirmed by FiveThirtyEight showing Sanders in the lead with 22%, followed by Warren with 18%, Buttigieg with 16% and Biden with 13%.

Debate qualifying poll as designated by the Democratic National Committee

Polling from December 1, 2019, to February 3, 2020
Poll source	Date(s) administered	Sample size (Note: Key: A – all adults RV – registered voters LV – likely voters V – unclear)	Margin of error	Joe Biden	Pete Buttigieg	Tulsi Gabbard	Amy Klobuchar	Bernie Sanders	Tom Steyer	Elizabeth Warren	Andrew Yang	Other	Undecided
Emerson College	Jan 30 – Feb 2, 2020	853 (LV)	± 3.3%	21%	15%	1%	11%	28%	4%	14%	5%	2%	–
Data for Progress	Jan 28 – Feb 2, 2020	2,394 (LV)	± 1.6%	24% (Note: After reallocation of delegates from candidates estimated to not clear the viability threshold in each precinct)	22%	–	–	28%	–	25%	–	–	–
Data for Progress	Jan 28 – Feb 2, 2020	2,394 (LV)	± 1.6%	18%	18%	2%	9%	22%	4%	19%	6%	2% (Note: Bloomberg with 2%)	–
YouGov/CBS News (MRP)	Jan 22–31, 2020	1,835 (RV)	± 3%	25%	21%	(Note: Data not yet released, but all other candidates each have <5%)	5%	25%		16%			
David Binder Research/Focus on Rural America	Jan 28–30, 2020	300 (LV)	± 5.7%	46% (Note: If the contest came down to Biden and Sanders)	–	–	–	40%	–	–	–	–	14%
David Binder Research/Focus on Rural America	Jan 28–30, 2020	300 (LV)	± 5.7%	15%	19%	3%	11%	17%	3%	15%	1%	2% (Note: Bloomberg and Delaney with 1%; Bennet and Patrick with 0%)	12%
American Research Group	Jan 27–30, 2020	400 (LV)	± 4.0%	17%	9%	2%	16%	23%	3%	15%	5%	4% (Note: Bloomberg with 2%; Bennet and Patrick with 0%; others with 2%)	6%
Civiqs/Data for Progress	Jan 26–29, 2020	615 (LV)	± 4.7%	20% (Note: Re-allocating support to second choice for candidates receiving <15% of first choice votes)	18%	1%	0%	31%	2%	25%	1%	1% (Note: Bennet with 1%; Delaney with 0%)	2%
Civiqs/Data for Progress	Jan 26–29, 2020	615 (LV)	± 4.7%	15%	15%	2%	8%	28%	2%	21%	5%	0% (Note: Bennet and Delaney with 0%)	2%
Park Street Strategies	Jan 24–28, 2020	600 (LV)	± 3.0%	20%	17%	1%	12%	18%	4%	17%	5%	<1% (Note: Bloomberg with <1%)	6%
Monmouth University	Jan 23–27, 2020	544 (LV)	± 4.2%	29% (Note: If only the four candidates listed were viable in the voters' caucus sites)	20%	–	–	25%	–	19%	–	1% (Note: "None of these/won't caucus" with 1%)	6%
Monmouth University	Jan 23–27, 2020	544 (LV)	± 4.2%	22% (Note: If only the six candidates listed were viable in the voters' caucus sites)	17%	–	12%	22%	–	16%	5%	<1% (Note: "None of these/won't caucus" with <1%)	6%
Monmouth University	Jan 23–27, 2020	544 (LV)	± 4.2%	23%	16%	1%	10%	21%	4%	15%	3%	1% (Note: Bennet with 1%; Delaney and Patrick with 0%; other with <1%; "no one" with 0%)	5%
Civiqs/Iowa State University	Jan 23–27, 2020	655 (LV)	± 4.8%	15%	17%	2%	11%	24%	4%	19%	5%	2% (Note: Bloomberg and Delaney with 1%; Bennet and Patrick with 0%)	3% (Note: Reported as "Unsure")
Emerson College	Jan 23–26, 2020	450 (LV)	± 4.6%	21%	10%	5%	13%	30%	5%	11%	5%	2% (Note: Delaney with 1%; Bennet and Patrick with 0%; Someone Else with 1%)	–
Suffolk University/USA Today	Jan 23–26, 2020	500 (LV)	± 4.4%	25.4%	17.6%	0.8%	5.6%	18.6%	2.2%	13.2%	3.0%	13.6% (Note: Patrick with 0.2%; Bennet and Delaney with 0.0%; "Other/Please Specify" with 0.4%; "Don't Know/Refused" with 13%)	–
Change Research/Crooked Media	Jan 22–26, 2020	704 (LV)	± 3.7%	22% (Note: If voters could choose only one of Biden, Buttigieg, Sanders or Warren)	23%	–	–	30%	–	20%	–	–	5%
Change Research/Crooked Media	Jan 22–26, 2020	704 (LV)	± 3.7%	18%	19%	1%	10%	27%	4%	15%	4%	2% (Note: Delaney and Patrick with 1%; Bennet with 0%)	–
Siena College/New York Times	Jan 20–23, 2020	584 (LV)	± 4.8%	23% (Note: If the field is narrowed to these top four candidates)	23%	–	–	30%	–	19%	–	–	8% (Note: Listed as "don't know/refused")
Siena College/New York Times	Jan 20–23, 2020	584 (LV)	± 4.8%	17%	18%	1%	8%	25%	3%	15%	3%	1% (Note: Bloomberg with 1%; Bennet, Delaney, and Patrick with 0%)	8%
Morningside College	Jan 17–23, 2020	253 (LV)	± 6.2%	19%	18%	3%	12%	15%	6%	15%	4%	2% (Note: Bennet, Bloomberg and Delaney with 1%; Patrick with 0%)	4%
YouGov/CBS News	Jan 16–23, 2020	1401 (RV)	± 3.9%	25%	22%	0%	7%	26%	1%	15%	1%	2% (Note: Delaney with 1%; Bennet and Patrick with 0%; someone else with 1%)	1%
Civiqs/Data for Progress	Jan 19–21, 2020	590 (LV)	± 4.8%	17%	19%	2%	6%	24%	3%	19%	5%	0% (Note: Bennet and Delaney with 0%)	5%
David Binder Research/Focus on Rural America	Jan 15–18, 2020	500 (LV)	± 4.4%	24%	16%	1%	11%	14%	4%	18%	3%	2% (Note: Bennet and Bloomberg with 1%; Delaney and Patrick with 0%)	–
Neighbourhood Research and Media/Breitbart	Jan 14–17, 2020	300 (LV)	± 4.8%	23%	17%	– (Note: Not listed separately from "others")	11%	10%	2%	15%	2%	6% (Note: Trump with 5%; "others" with 2%)	13%
	Jan 13, 2020	Booker withdraws from the race											
Monmouth University	Jan 9–12, 2020	405 (LV)	± 4.9%	28% (Note: If the only viable candidates to caucus for were the four listed in this poll)	25%	–	–	24%	–	16%	–	2% (Note: "None of these/wouldn't vote" with 2%)	4%
Monmouth University	Jan 9–12, 2020	405 (LV)	± 4.9%	24%	17%	2%	8%	18%	4%	15%	4%	4% (Note: Booker with 4%, Bennet and Delaney with <1%, Patrick with 0%, Other with <1%)	5%
Selzer/CNN/Des Moines Register	January 2–8, 2020	701 (LV)	± 3.7%	15%	16%	2%	6%	20%	2%	17%	5%	2% (Note: Booker with 3%; Bloomberg with 1%; Bennet, Castro, Delaney, Patrick and Williamson with 0%; someone else with 1%)	11%
YouGov/CBS News	Dec 27, 2019 – Jan 3, 2020	953 (RV)	± 3.8%	23%	23%	1%	7%	23%	2%	16%	2%	2% (Note: Booker with 2%; Bennet, Castro, Delaney, Patrick and Williamson with 0%; someone else with 1%)	1%
KG Polling	Dec 19–23, 2019	750 (LV)	± 3.8%	24%	12%	–	5%	31%	–	13%	10%	–	5% (Note: Includes "refused")
Civiqs/Iowa State University	Dec 12–16, 2019	632 (LV)	± 4.9%	15%	24%	3%	4%	21%	2%	18%	3%	4% (Note: Booker with 3%; Castro with 1%; Delaney, Bloomberg, Bennet, Williamson with 0%)	4%
Emerson College	Dec 7–10, 2019	325 (LV)	± 5.4%	23%	18%	2%	10%	22%	3%	12%	2%	8% (Note: Booker with 4%; Bloomberg with 2%; Bennet, Castro, Delaney, Patrick and Williamson with 0%; someone else with 2%)	–
	Dec 3, 2019	Harris withdraws from the race											

Polling during November 2019
Poll source	Date(s) administered	Sample size	Margin of error	Joe Biden	Pete Buttigieg	Tulsi Gabbard	Kamala Harris	Amy Klobuchar	Bernie Sanders	Tom Steyer	Elizabeth Warren	Andrew Yang	Other	Undecided
Civiqs/Iowa State University	Nov 15–19, 2019	614 (LV)	± 4.9%	12%	26%	2%	2%	5%	18%	2%	19%	4%	6% (Note: Bennet, Bloomberg, Booker, Bullock, Castro and Williamson with 1%; Delaney, Messam, Patrick and Sestak with 0%)	3%
Des Moines Register/CNN	Nov 8–13, 2019	500 (LV)	± 4.4%	15%	25%	3%	3%	6%	15%	3%	16%	3%	6% (Note: Booker with 3%; Bloomberg with 2%; Bennet with 1%; Bullock, Castro, Delaney, Sestak and Williamson with 0%; none with 2%)	5%
YouGov/CBS News	Nov 6–13, 2019	856 (RV)	± 4.1%	22%	21%	0%	5%	5%	22%	2%	18%	1%	4% (Note: Booker, Bullock, and Castro with 1%, Messam, Delaney, Bennet, Williamson, and Sestak with 0%, "Someone else" with 1%)	–
Monmouth University	Nov 7–11, 2019	451 (LV)	± 4.6%	19%	22%	2%	3%	5%	13%	3%	18%	3%	6% (Note: Booker with 2%; Bullock and Castro with 1%; Bennet, Bloomberg, Delaney, and Williamson with <1%; Sestak with 0%)	8%
University of Iowa	Oct 28 – Nov 10, 2019	465 (LV)	± 4.6%	15%	16%	3%	2%	1%	18%	3%	23%	3%	2% (Note: Castro with 1%; Bennet, Booker, Bullock, Delaney, O'Rourke and Ryan with 0%)	13%
Public Policy Polling	Nov 5–6, 2019	715 (LV)	–	13%	20%	–	3%	9%	14%	6%	21%	3%	–	10%
Quinnipiac University	Oct 30 – Nov 5, 2019	698 (LV)	± 4.5%	15%	19%	3%	4%	5%	17%	3%	20%	3%	4% (Note: Bennett, Booker, Bullock and Castro with 1%; Delaney, Messam, Sestak and Williamson with 0%)	8%
	Nov 1, 2019	O'Rourke withdraws from the race												

Polling before November 2019
Poll source	Date(s) administered	Sample size	Margin of error	Joe Biden	Cory Booker	Pete Buttigieg	Kamala Harris	Amy Klobuchar	Beto O'Rourke	Bernie Sanders	Elizabeth Warren	Other	Undecided
Siena College/New York Times	Oct 25–30, 2019	439 (LV)	± 4.7%	17%	2%	18%	3%	4%	1%	19%	22%	8% (Note: Yang with 3%; Gabbard and Steyer with 2%; Delaney with 1%; Bennet, Bullock, Castro, Messam, Sestak and Williamson with 0%)	6%
Civiqs/Iowa State University	Oct 18–22, 2019	598 (LV)	± 5%	12%	1%	20%	3%	4%	1%	18%	28%	8% (Note: Steyer with 3%; Gabbard and Yang with 2%; Bennet with 1%; Bullock, Castro, Delaney, Ryan and Williamson with 0%; Messam and Sestak with no voters (Note: As evidenced by Sestak being listed in second choices but not first preferences and the lack of an 'other' column in the first preferences topline))	4%
Suffolk University/USA Today	Oct 16–18, 2019	500 (LV)	± 4.4%	18%	1%	13%	3%	3%	1%	9%	17%	7% (Note: Gabbard and Steyer with 3%; Yang with 1%; Delaney, Ryan and Williamson with 0%; Bennet, Bullock, Castro, Messam and Sestak with no voters; refused with 0%)	29%
Emerson College	Oct 13–16, 2019	317 (LV)	± 5.5%	23%	3%	16%	2%	1%	0%	13%	23%	15% (Note: Yang with 5%; Bullock with 4%; Gabbard and Steyer with 2%; Bennet and Williamson with 1%; Castro with 0%; Delaney, Messam, Ryan and Sestak with no voters; everyone else with 4%)	–
Firehouse Strategies/Øptimus	Oct 8–10, 2019	548 (LV)	± 3.6%	22%	2%	17%	3%	– (Note: The poll did not announce this result separately; it is listed as part of 'Other'.)	1%	5%	25%	26% (Note: Yang with 1%; a different Democratic candidate, don't know, or refused with 25%)	–
YouGov/CBS News	Oct 3–11, 2019	729 (RV)	± 4.6%	22%	2%	14%	5%	2%	2%	21%	22%	7% (Note: Steyer with 3%; Bennet, Gabbard, Williamson, and Ryan with 1%, Bullock, Castro, Delaney, Messam, Sestak, and Yang with 0%; "someone else" with 0%)	–
Selzer/CNN/Des Moines Register	Sep 14–18, 2019	602 (LV)	± 4.0%	20%	3%	9%	6%	3%	2%	11%	22%	11% (Note: Gabbard, Steyer, and Yang with 2%, Bullock, Castro, and Delaney with 1%, Bennet, de Blasio, Ryan, Sestak, and Williamson with 0%; "none of these" with 2%)	14%
David Binder Research	Sep 14–17, 2019	500 (LV)	± 4.4%	25%	2%	12%	5%	8%	1%	9%	23%	9% (Note: Steyer with 3%; Yang with 2%; Bullock, Castro, Delaney and Gabbard with 1%; Bennet, de Blasio, Messam, Ryan, Sestak and Williamson with 0%)	6%
Civiqs/Iowa State University	Sep 13–17, 2019	572 (LV)	± 5.2%	16%	2%	13%	5%	3%	2%	16%	24%	11% (Note: Gabbard with 4%; Yang with 3%; Steyer with 2%; Ryan and Williamson with 1%; Bennet, de Blasio, Bullock, Castro and Delaney with 0%)	8%
YouGov/CBS News	Aug 28 – Sep 4, 2019	835	± 4.3%	29%	2%	7%	6%	2%	2%	26%	17%	9% (Note: Steyer with 2%; Castro, de Blasio, Delaney, Gabbard and Yang with 1%; Bennet, Bullock, Messam, Ryan, Sestak and Williamson with 0%; someone else with 2%)	–
Change Research	Aug 9–11, 2019	621 (LV)	± 3.9%	17%	3%	13%	8%	2%	3%	17%	28%	9% (Note: Bullock, Gabbard, and Steyer with 2%; Bennet, Castro, and Yang with 1%; Delaney, Gillibrand, Hickenlooper, Messam, and Williamson with 0%)	–
Monmouth University	Aug 1–4, 2019	401 (LV)	± 4.9%	28%	1%	8%	11%	3%	<1%	9%	19%	11% (Note: Steyer with 3%; Gillibrand and Yang with 2%; Bullock, Delaney, Gabbard, and Hickenlooper with 1%; Bennet, Castro, Inslee, O'Rourke, and Williamson with <1%; de Blasio, Messam, Moulton, Ryan, and Sestak with 0%)	10%
Firehouse Strategies/Øptimus	Jul 23–25, 2019	630	± 3.3%	23%	2%	7%	12%	–	2%	11%	23%	4%	16%
YouGov/CBS News	Jul 9–18, 2019	706	± 4.4%	24%	3%	7%	16%	4%	1%	19%	17%	9% (Note: Castro and Steyer with 2%; Delaney, Gillibrand, Hickenlooper, and Sestak with 1%; Bennet, Bullock, de Blasio, Gabbard, Gravel, Inslee, Messam, Moulton, Ryan, Williamson, and Yang with 0%)	–
	Jul 9, 2019	Steyer announces his candidacy											
Change Research	Jun 29 – Jul 4, 2019	420 (LV)	–	16%	1%	25%	16%	1%	2%	16%	18%	5% (Note: Castro, Delaney, Gabbard, Gillibrand, Inslee, Swalwell, and Yang with 1%; Bennet, Bullock, Gravel, Hickenlooper, Moulton, Ryan, and Williamson with 0%)	–
David Binder Research	Jun 29 – Jul 1, 2019	600	± 4.0%	17%	2%	10%	18%	4%	1%	12%	20%	9% (Note: Bennet, Bullock, Castro, de Blasio, Delaney, Gabbard, Gillibrand, Williamson, and Yang with 1%; Hickenlooper, Inslee, Ryan, and Swalwell with <1%; Messam and Moulton with 0%; others with <1%)	9%
Suffolk University/USA Today	Jun 28 – Jul 1, 2019	500	± 4.4%	24%	2%	6%	16%	2%	1%	9%	13%	6% (Note: Bennet, Castro, Delaney, Gabbard, and Yang with 1%; Bullock, de Blasio, Gillibrand, Gravel, Hickenlooper, Inslee, Messam, Moulton, Ryan, Sestak, Swalwell, and Williamson with 0%; others with 1%)	21%
Change Research	Jun 17–20, 2019	308 (LV)	–	27%	5%	17%	4%	2%	1%	18%	20%	7% (Note: Delaney with 2%; Castro, Gabbard, Gravel, Moulton, and Yang with 1%; Bullock, de Blasio, Gillibrand, Hickenlooper, Inslee, Messam, Ryan, Swalwell, and Williamson with 0%)	–
Selzer/CNN/Des Moines Register	Jun 2–5, 2019	600	± 4.0%	24%	1%	14%	7%	2%	2%	16%	15%	6% (Note: Bennet, Castro, Delaney, Gabbard, Inslee, and Yang with 1%; Bullock, Gillibrand, Hickenlooper, Moulton, Ryan, Swalwell, and Williamson with <1%; de Blasio and Messam with 0%)	6%
Change Research	May 15–19, 2019	615 (LV)	± 3.9%	24%	1%	14%	10%	2%	5%	24%	12%	9% (Note: Yang with 2%; Abrams, Delaney, Gabbard, Gillibrand, Hickenlooper, Inslee, and Swalwell with 1%; Bennet, Bullock, Castro, Ryan, and Williamson with 0%)	–
Firehouse Strategies/Øptimus	Apr 30 – May 2, 2019	576	± 4.1%	35%	2%	11%	5%	4%	3%	14%	10%	–	16%
	Apr 25, 2019	Biden announces his candidacy											
Gravis Marketing	Apr 17–18, 2019	590	± 4.0%	19%	4%	14%	6%	4%	5%	19%	6%	7% (Note: Delaney with 2%; Gabbard, Gillibrand, Gravel, Hickenlooper, and Yang with 1%; Castro and Inslee with 0%)	16%
	Apr 14, 2019	Buttigieg announces his candidacy											
Monmouth University	Apr 4–9, 2019	351	± 5.2%	27%	3%	9%	7%	4%	6%	16%	7%	7% (Note: Castro with 2%; Delaney, Gillibrand, Ryan, Swalwell, and Yang with 1%; Bullock, de Blasio, Gabbard, and Inslee with <1%; Bennet, Hickenlooper, McAuliffe, Messam, Moulton, and Williamson with 0%)	12%
David Binder Research	Mar 21–24, 2019	500	± 4.4%	25%	7%	6%	9%	6%	6%	17%	8%	9% (Note: Delaney with 3%; Castro, Gabbard, Gillibrand, Inslee, Swalwell, and Yang with 1%; Bullock, Hickenlooper, and Williamson with <1%; Bennet and McAuliffe with 0%; others with <1%)	7%
Emerson College	Mar 21–24, 2019	249	± 6.2%	25%	6%	11%	10%	2%	5%	24%	9%	8% (Note: Castro, Gabbard, Hickenlooper, and Inslee with 1%; Gillibrand and Yang with 0%; others with 4%)	–
Public Policy Polling (D) (Note: Poll sponsored by End Citizens United)	Mar 14–15, 2019	678	–	29%	4%	–	5%	6%	7%	15%	8%	4%	22%
	Mar 14, 2019	O'Rourke announces his candidacy											
Selzer/CNN/Des Moines Register	Mar 3–6, 2019	401	± 4.9%	27%	3%	1%	7%	3%	5%	25%	9%	5% (Note: Bennet, Bullock, Castro, Delaney, and Inslee with 1%; Bloomberg, de Blasio, Gabbard, Gillibrand, Hickenlooper, Holder, Swalwell, Williamson, and Yang with <1%)	10%
	Feb 19, 2019	Sanders announces his candidacy											
	Feb 10, 2019	Klobuchar announces her candidacy											
	Feb 9, 2019	Warren announces her candidacy											
Firehouse Strategies/Øptimus	Jan 31 – Feb 2, 2019	558	± 3.6%	25%	4%	–	17%	5%	4%	10%	11%	1% (Note: Gillibrand with 1%)	25%
Emerson College	Jan 30 – Feb 2, 2019	260	± 6.0%	29%	4%	0%	18%	3%	6%	15%	11%	15% (Note: Brown with 4%; Castro with 2%; Delaney and Gillibrand with 1%; Gabbard and Yang with 0%; others with 8%)	–
	Feb 1, 2019	Booker announces his candidacy											
	Jan 21, 2019	Harris announces her candidacy											
	Jan 11, 2019	Gabbard announces her candidacy											
Change Research	Dec 13–17, 2018	1,291 (LV)	–	20%	4%	–	7%	5%	19%	20%	7%	18% (Note: Kennedy with 5%; Clinton with 4%; Brown with 2%; Bloomberg, Castro, Cuomo, Delaney, Gillibrand, Kerry, and Swalwell with 1%; Holder, McAuliffe, Schultz, and Steyer with 0%)	–
Selzer/CNN/Des Moines Register	Dec 10–13, 2018	455	± 4.6%	32%	4%	–	5%	3%	11%	19%	8%	7% (Note: Bloomberg with 3%; Brown, Castro, Delaney, and Hickenlooper with 1%; Bullock, Garcetti, Gillibrand, Holder, Inslee, Steyer, Swalwell, and Yang with <1%)	6%
David Binder Research	Dec 10–11, 2018	500	± 4.4%	30%	6%	–	7%	10%	11%	13%	9%	8% (Note: Brown with 3%; Bloomberg and Kerry with 2%; Delaney with 1%; Garcetti with 0%; others with <1%)	6%
David Binder Research	Sep 20–23, 2018	500	± 4.4%	37%	8%	–	10%	–	–	12%	16%	6% (Note: Gillibrand and Holder with 2%; Avenatti and Delaney with 1%; Bullock, Garcetti, Landrieu, and Patrick with <1%; others with 1%)	9%
	Nov 6, 2017	Yang announces his candidacy											
Public Policy Polling (D) (Note: Poll sponsored by O'Say Can You See PAC, the PAC that supported O'Malley in 2016)	Mar 3–6, 2017	1,062	–	–	17%	–	3%	11%	–	–	–	34% (Note: O'Malley with 18%; Cuomo with 8%; Castro and Sandberg with 4%; Gillibrand with 3%; Schultz with 1%)	32%

== New Hampshire primary ==
The New Hampshire Democratic primary was held on February 11, 2020.

Polling aggregation
Source of poll aggregation	Date updated	Dates polled	Bernie Sanders	Pete Buttigieg	Elizabeth Warren	Joe Biden	Amy Klobuchar	Andrew Yang	Tulsi Gabbard	Tom Steyer	Other	Un- decided
270 to Win	Feb 10, 2020	Feb 4–9, 2020	27.3%	20.9%	13.1%	12.3%	10.3%	3.0%	2.7%	2.1%	1.9% (Note: Patrick with 0.8%; Bennet with 0.6%; Bloomberg with 0.5%)	6.4%
RealClear Politics	Feb 10, 2020	Feb 6–9, 2020	28.7%	21.3%	11.0%	11.0%	11.7%	3.7%	3.3%	1.7%	1.3% (Note: Patrick with 1.0%; Bennet with 0.3%; Bloomberg not reported)	6.3%
FiveThirtyEight	Feb 10, 2020	until Feb 10, 2020	26.0%	21.6%	12.5%	11.7%	10.3%	3.0%	2.9%	2.6%	3.5% (Note: Bloomberg with 2.3%; Patrick with 0.7%; Bennet with 0.5%)	5.8%
Average			27.3%	21.3%	12.2%	11.7%	10.8%	3.2%	3.0%	2.1%	2.2% (Note: Bloomberg with 0.9%; Patrick with 0.8%; Bennet with 0.5%)	6.2%
New Hampshire primary results (February 11, 2020)			25.6%	24.3%	9.2%	8.4%	19.7%	2.8%	3.3%	3.6%	2.7% (Note: Patrick with 0.4%; Bennet with 0.3%; Booker with 0.1%; Boyd, Burke, Bullock, Castro, De La Fuente III, Delaney, Dunlap, Ellinger, Gleib, Greenstein, Harris, Hewes, Koos, Kraus, Krichevsky, Moroz, Sloan, Sestak, Thistle, Torgesen, Wells and Williamson with 0.0%; other (write-in candidates) with 1.5%)	–

– Debate qualifying poll as designated by the Democratic National Committee

Polling from January 1, 2020, to February 11, 2020
Poll source	Date(s) administered	Sample size	Margin of error	Joe Biden	Pete Buttigieg	Tulsi Gabbard	Amy Klobuchar	Bernie Sanders	Tom Steyer	Elizabeth Warren	Andrew Yang	Other	Undecided
New Hampshire primary (popular vote)	Feb 11, 2020	–	–	8.4%	24.3%	3.3%	19.7%	25.6%	3.6%	9.2%	2.8%	2.7% (Note: Patrick with 0.4%; Bennet with 0.3%; Booker with 0.1%; Boyd, Burke, Bullock, Castro, De La Fuente III, Delaney, Dunlap, Ellinger, Gleib, Greenstein, Harris, Hewes, Koos, Kraus, Krichevsky, Moroz, Sloan, Sestak, Thistle, Torgesen, Wells and Williamson; other (write-in candidates) with 1.5%)	–
AtlasIntel	Feb 8–10, 2020	431 (LV)	± 5.0%	12%	24%	3%	14%	24%	1%	11%	5%	–	6%
Data For Progress (Note: By the time of this poll, Data for Progress, which has worked with both the Sanders and Warren campaigns, had endorsed Warren)	Feb 7–10, 2020	1296 (LV)	± 2.7%	9%	26%	3%	13%	28%	3%	14%	5%	–	–
American Research Group	Feb 8–9, 2020	400 (LV)	–	13%	20%	3%	13%	28%	2%	11%	3%	5% (Note: Bennet, Bloomberg and Patrick with 1%; other with 2%)	2%
Emerson College/WHDH	Feb 8–9, 2020	500 (LV)	± 4.3%	10%	23%	2%	14%	30%	2%	11%	4%	4% (Note: Bennet and Patrick with 1%; "someone else" with 2%)	–
Change Research	Feb 8–9, 2020	662 (LV)	± 3.8%	9%	21%	6%	8%	30%	3%	8%	5%	1% (Note: Patrick with 1%; Bennet with 0%)	9%
Suffolk University/Boston Globe/WBZ-TV	Feb 8–9, 2020	500 (LV)	± 4.4%	12%	19%	3%	14%	27%	2%	12%	3%	3% (Note: Patrick with 1%; Bennet with 0%; other with 2%; refused with 0%)	7%
Elucd	Feb 7–9, 2020	492 (LV)	± 4.4%	8%	20%	– (Note: Not yet released)	12%	26%	– (Note: Not yet released)	10%	– (Note: Not yet released)	– (Note: Not yet released)	15%
University of New Hampshire/CNN	Feb 6–9, 2020	365 (LV)	± 5.1%	11%	22%	5%	7%	29%	1%	10%	4%	1% (Note: Bennet and Bloomberg with 0%; Patrick with no voters; other with 1%)	10%
Emerson College/WHDH	Feb 7–8, 2020	500 (LV)	± 4.3%	11%	20%	3%	13%	30%	2%	12%	4%	4% (Note: Patrick with 1%; Bennet with 0%; "someone else" with 3%)	–
Suffolk University/Boston Globe/WBZ-TV	Feb 7–8, 2020	500 (LV)	± 4.4%	10%	22%	2%	9%	24%	2%	13%	3%	3% (Note: Bennet and Patrick with 0%; "Other" with 3%)	12%
Boston Herald/FPU/NBC10	Feb 5–8, 2020	512 (LV)	–	14%	20%	0%	6%	23%	2%	16%	3%	3% (Note: Bennet with 1%; Patrick with no voters; other with 2%)	13%
YouGov/CBS News	Feb 5–8, 2020	848 (LV)	± 4.3%	12%	25%	2%	10%	29%	1%	17%	1%	3% (Note: Patrick with 1%; Bennet with 0%; "someone else" with 2%)	–
University of New Hampshire/CNN	Feb 5–8, 2020	384 (LV)	± 5.0%	12%	21%	5%	6%	28%	2%	9%	4%	2% (Note: Bloomberg with 1%; others with 1%)	11%
Emerson College/WHDH	Feb 6–7, 2020	500 (LV)	± 4.3%	11%	24%	5%	9%	31%	2%	11%	3%	3% (Note: Patrick and Bennet with 0%; "someone else" with 3%)	–
Suffolk University/Boston Globe/WBZ-TV	Feb 6–7, 2020	500 (LV)	± 4.4%	11%	25%	2%	6%	24%	2%	14%	3%	4% (Note: Bennet with 1%; Patrick with 0%; "Other" with 3%)	9%
University of Massachusetts Lowell	Feb 4–7, 2020	440 (LV)	± 6.5%	14%	17%	4%	8%	25%	5%	15%	3%	5% (Note: Bennet and Patrick with 1%; "another candidate" with 3%)	4%
University of New Hampshire/CNN	Feb 4–7, 2020	365 (LV)	± 5.1%	11%	21%	6%	5%	28%	3%	9%	3%	3% (Note: Bloomberg with 2%; Patrick and Bennet with 0%; "Other" with 1%)	11%
Emerson College/WHDH	Feb 5–6, 2020	500 (LV)	± 4.3%	11%	23%	6%	9%	32%	2%	13%	2%	3% (Note: Patrick and Bennet with 0%; "someone else" with 3%)	–
Suffolk University/Boston Globe/WBZ-TV	Feb 5–6, 2020	500 (LV)	± 4.4%	11%	23%	4%	6%	24%	3%	13%	3%	4% (Note: Bennet and Patrick with 1%; "Other" with 2%)	12%
Marist/NBC News	Feb 4–6, 2020	709 (LV)	± 4.7%	13%	21%	3%	8%	25%	4%	14%	4%	3% (Note: Patrick and Bennet with 1%; "Other" with 1%)	5%
Suffolk University/Boston Globe/WBZ-TV	Feb 4–5, 2020	500 (LV)	± 4.4%	12%	19%	5%	6%	25%	4%	11%	2%	1% (Note: Bennet and Patrick with 0%; "Other" with 1%)	15%
Monmouth University	Feb 3–5, 2020	503 (LV)	± 4.4%	17%	20%	4%	9%	24%	3%	13%	4%	2% (Note: Bennet with 1%; Patrick with <1%; "Other" with 1%)	5%
Monmouth University	Feb 3–5, 2020	503 (LV)	± 4.4%	17% (Note: If the primary came down to the five candidates listed in this poll)	22%	–	13%	27%	–	13%	–	3% (Note: "None of these/won't vote" with 3%)	4%
Monmouth University	Feb 3–5, 2020	503 (LV)	± 4.4%	19% (Note: If the primary came down to the four candidates listed in this poll)	28%	–	–	28%	–	16%	–	3% (Note: "None of these/won't vote" with 3%)	5%
Emerson College/WHDH	Feb 3–5, 2020	500 (LV)	± 4.3%	12%	21%	5%	11%	31%	1%	12%	4%	2% (Note: Patrick and Bennet with 0%; "someone else" with 2%)	–
Suffolk University/Boston Globe/WBZ-TV	Feb 3–4, 2020	500 (LV)	± 4.4%	15%	15%	5%	6%	24%	5%	10%	3%	1% (Note: Bennet and Patrick with 0%; "Other" with 1%)	14%
Emerson College/WHDH	Feb 2–4, 2020	500 (LV)	± 4.3%	13%	17%	6%	11%	32%	2%	11%	6%	3% (Note: Patrick with 1%; Bennet with 0%; "someone else" with 2%)	–
	Feb 3, 2020	Iowa caucuses											
Suffolk University/Boston Globe/WBZ-TV	Feb 2–3, 2020	500 (LV)	± 4.4%	18%	11%	5%	6%	24%	4%	13%	3%	3% (Note: Bennet and Patrick with 1%; "Other" with 1%)	14%
Emerson College/WHDH	Feb 1–3, 2020	500 (LV)	± 4.3%	13%	12%	4%	12%	32%	5%	13%	5%	4% (Note: Bennet and Patrick with 0%; "someone else" with 4%)	–
Emerson College/WHDH	Jan 31 – Feb 2, 2020	500 (LV)	± 4.3%	14%	13%	7%	8%	29%	8%	12%	7%	2% (Note: Bennet and Patrick with 0%; "someone else" with 2%)	–
Saint Anselm College	Jan 29 – Feb 2, 2020	491 (LV)	± 4.4%	19%	14%	3%	11%	19%	5%	11%	4%	2% (Note: Bloomberg with 2%; Bennet and Patrick with <1%)	11%
Boston Herald/FPU/NBC10	Jan 29 – Feb 1, 2020	454 (LV)	± 4.6%	24%	8%	3%	4%	31%	No voters	17%	1%	5% (Note: Bloomberg with 2%; Bennet with 1%; Patrick with no voters; other with 2%)	7%
University of Massachusetts Lowell	Jan 28–31, 2020	400 (LV)	± 6.4%	22%	12%	5%	6%	23%	6%	19%	2%	1% (Note: Patrick with 1%; Bennet and Delaney with 0%)	4%
YouGov/UMass Amherst/WCVB	Jan 17–29, 2020	500 (LV)	± 5.3%	20%	12%	5%	5%	25%	5%	17%	4%	2% (Note: Bennet, Delaney, and Patrick with 0%; "Other" with 2%)	3%
American Research Group	Jan 24–27, 2020	600 (LV)	± 4%	13%	12%	8%	7%	28%	2%	11%	5%	8% (Note: Bloomberg (explicitly as a write in) and Patrick with 2%; Bennet with 1%; "Other" with 3%; Delaney not reported)	6%
Boston Herald/FPU/NBC10	Jan 23–26, 2020	407 (LV)	± 4.9%	22%	10%	3%	5%	29%	0%	16%	1%	7% (Note: Bloomberg with 3%; Bennet with 2%; Delaney and Patrick with 0%; "Other" with 2%)	9%
Marist/NBC News	Jan 20–23, 2020	697 (LV)	± 4.5%	15%	17%	6%	10%	22%	3%	13%	5%	2% (Note: Bennet and Patrick with 1%; Delaney with <1%)	7%
University of New Hampshire/CNN	Jan 15–23, 2020	516 (LV)	± 4.3%	16%	15%	5%	6%	25%	2%	12%	5%	2% (Note: Bloomberg and Delaney with 1%; Bennet and Patrick with 0%)	10%
MassINC Polling Group/WBUR	Jan 17–21, 2020	426 (LV)	± 4.8%	14%	17%	5%	6%	29%	2%	13%	5%	4% (Note: Bloomberg and Patrick with 1%; Bennet with <1%; Delaney with 0%; some other candidate with 2%; would not vote with <1%)	5% (Note: Listed as "Don't know/refused")
Suffolk University/Boston Globe	Jan 15–19, 2020	500 (LV)	± 4.4%	15%	12%	5%	5%	16%	3%	10%	6%	3% (Note: Bennet and Patrick with 1%; Delaney with 0%)	24%
Emerson College/WHDH	Jan 13–16, 2020	657 (LV)	± 3.8%	14%	18%	5%	10%	23%	4%	14%	6%	7% (Note: Delaney with 1%; Bennet and Patrick with no voters; "someone else" with 6%)	–
	Jan 13, 2020	Booker withdraws from the race											
Boston Herald/FPU/NBC10	Jan 8–12, 2020	434 (LV)	–	26%	7%	4%	2%	22%	2%	18%	2%	7% (Note: Bloomberg with 4%; Bennet, Delaney, Patrick and Williamson with no voters; other with 1%)	12%
Patinkin Research Strategies/Yang 2020 (Note: Sponsored by a presidential candidate's campaign)	Jan 5–7, 2020	600 (LV)	± 4%	21%	17%	7%	6%	19%	6%	10%	5%	3% (Note: Booker with 2%; "someone else" with 1%)	7%
Monmouth University	Jan 3–7, 2020	404 (LV)	± 4.9%	19%	20%	4%	6%	18%	4%	15%	3%	3% (Note: Bennet with 2%; Booker with 1%; Delaney and Williamson with 0%; Patrick and "Someone else" with 0%)	7%
Monmouth University	Jan 3–7, 2020	404 (LV)	± 4.9%	21% (Note: If the primary came down to the seven candidates listed in this poll)	20%	–	7%	21%	–	15%	5%	5% (Note: "None of these" with 3%; Booker with 2%)	8%
Monmouth University	Jan 3–7, 2020	404 (LV)	± 4.9%	24% (Note: If the primary came down to the four candidates listed in this poll)	23%	–	–	21%	–	18%	–	5% (Note: "None of these" with 5%)	8%
YouGov/CBS News	Dec 27, 2019 – Jan 3, 2020	487 (LV)	± 5.3%	25%	13%	1%	7%	27%	3%	18%	2%	3% (Note: Booker with 2%; Patrick with 1%; Bennet, Castro, Delaney, and Williamson with 0%; "Someone else" with 0%)	–

Polling before January 2020
Poll source	Date(s) administered	Sample size	Margin of error	Joe Biden	Cory Booker	Pete Buttigieg	Tulsi Gabbard	Kamala Harris	Amy Klobuchar	Beto O'Rourke	Deval Patrick	Bernie Sanders	Elizabeth Warren	Andrew Yang	Other	Undecided
MassINC Polling Group/WBUR	Dec 3–8, 2019	442 (LV)	± 4.7%	17%	1%	18%	5%	–	3%	–	<1%	15%	12%	5%	11% (Note: Steyer with 3%; Bloomberg with 2%; Williamson with 1%; Bennet with <1%; Castro and Delaney with 0%; someone else with 2%; would not vote with 3%)	12% (Note: Includes "refused")
	Dec 3, 2019	Harris withdraws from the race														
Emerson College	Nov 22–26, 2019	549 (LV)	± 4.1%	14%	2%	22%	6%	4%	2%	–	0%	26%	14%	5%	7% (Note: Steyer with 3%; Bloomberg and Williamson with 1%; Bennet, Bullock, Castro and Delaney and Sestak and with 0%; someone else with 2%)	–
Boston Globe/Suffolk University	Nov 21–24, 2019	500 (LV)	–	12%	2%	13%	6%	3%	1%	–	1%	16%	14%	4%	6% (Note: Steyer with 2%; Bullock, Castro and Delaney with 1%; Bennet, Sestak and Williamson with 0%; others with 2%; refused with 1%)	21%
Saint Anselm College	Nov 13–18, 2019	255 (RV)	± 6.1%	15%	3%	25%	3%	1%	6%	–	0%	9%	15%	2%	5% (Note: Steyer with 5%; Delaney and Williamson with 0%)	13%
	Nov 14, 2019	Patrick announces his candidacy														
YouGov/CBS News	Nov 6–13, 2019	535 (RV)	± 5%	22%	1%	16%	0%	3%	3%	–	–	20%	31%	1%	1% (Note: Steyer with 1%; Bennet, Bullock, Castro, Delaney, Messam, Sestak, Williamson with 0%, "Someone else" with 2%)	–
Quinnipiac University	Nov 6–10, 2019	1,134 (LV)	± 3.8	20%	1%	15%	6%	1%	3%	–	–	14%	16%	4%	5% (Note: Steyer with 3%; Bennet and Castro, with 1%, Bullock, Delaney, Messam, Sestak, Williamson with 0%)	14%
	Nov 1, 2019	O'Rourke withdraws from the race														
University of New Hampshire/CNN	Oct 21–27, 2019	574 (LV)	± 4.1%	15%	2%	10%	5%	3%	5%	2%	–	21%	18%	5%	4% (Note: Steyer with 3%; Sestak with 1%; Bennet, Castro, Delaney and other with 0%)	10%
Boston Herald/FPU	Oct 9–13, 2019	422 (LV)	± 4.8%	24%	2%	9%	1%	4%	2%	0%	–	22%	25%	1%	4% (Note: Steyer with 1%; Castro with 0% and Williamson with 0%; other with 3%)	7%
Firehouse Strategies/Øptimus	Oct 8–10, 2019	610 (LV)	± 3.7%	18%	2%	7%	– (Note: The poll did not announce this result separately; it is listed as part of 'Other'.)	2%	–	1%	–	9%	25%	2%	32%	–
YouGov/CBS News	Oct 3–11, 2019	506	± 5.4%	24%	1%	7%	2%	4%	2%	1%	–	17%	32%	5%	5% (Note: Steyer with 4%; Ryan with 1%, Bennet, Bullock, Castro, Delaney, Messam, Sestak, and Williamson with 0%; "someone else" with 0%)	–
Saint Anselm College	Sep 25–29, 2019	423	± 4.8%	24%	1%	10%	3%	5%	3%	<1%	–	11%	25%	2%	3% (Note: Steyer with 2%; "Other" with 1%; Castro with 0%; Delaney, Bullock, Bennet and Williamson with less than 1%)	9%
Monmouth University	Sep 17–21, 2019	401	± 4.9%	25%	2%	10%	2%	3%	2%	1%	–	12%	27%	2%	3% (Note: Steyer with 2%; Williamson with 1%; Castro, Delaney and Ryan with <1%; Bennet, de Blasio, Bullock, Messam and Sestak with 0%; "no one" with 1%;)	9%
HarrisX/No Labels	Sep 6–11, 2019	595	± 4.0%	22%	3%	5%	6%	5%	1%	1%	–	21%	15%	2%	5% (Note: Steyer with 2%; de Blasio, Delaney, and Williamson with 1%; Bennet, Bullock, Castro, Messam, Ryan and Sestak with 0%)	14%
Boston Herald/FPU	Sep 4–10, 2019	425	± 4.8%	21%	1%	5%	3%	6%	1%	2%	–	29%	17%	5%	2% (Note: Castro with 1%; others with 2%)	9%
Emerson College	Sep 6–9, 2019	483	± 4.4%	24%	4%	11%	6%	8%	1%	1%	–	13%	21%	3%	7% (Note: Delaney with 3%; Williamson with 1%; Bennet, Bullock, Castro, de Blasio, Messam, Ryan, and Sestak with 0%; someone else with 3%)	–
YouGov/CBS News	Aug 28 – Sep 4, 2019	526	± 5.2%	26%	2%	8%	1%	7%	1%	1%	–	25%	27%	1%	1% (Note: Steyer with 1%; Bennet, de Blasio, Bullock, Castro, Delaney, Messam, Ryan, Sestak, and Williamson with 0%)	–
Gravis Marketing	Aug 2–6, 2019	250	± 6.2%	15%	0%	8%	5%	7%	4%	2%	–	21%	12%	4%	8% (Note: Steyer with 4%; Castro with 2%; Gillibrand and Inslee with 1%)	11%
Suffolk University	Aug 1–4, 2019	500	± 4.4%	21%	1%	6%	3%	8%	1%	0%	–	17%	14%	1%	6% (Note: Bennet with 2%; Delaney, Gillibrand, Williamson, and Steyer with 1%; others with 0%)	21%
Firehouse Strategies/Øptimus	Jul 23–25, 2019	587	± 3.3%	21%	1%	8%	–	13%	–	0%	–	13%	16%	1%	7%	19%
YouGov/CBS News	Jul 9–18, 2019	530	± 5%	27%	1%	7%	2%	12%	1%	2%	–	20%	18%	1%	5% (Note: Castro, Delaney, Gillibrand, Hickenlooper, and Steyer with 1%; Bennet, Bullock, de Blasio, Gravel, Inslee, Messam, Moulton, Ryan, Sestak, and Williamson with 0%)	–
University of New Hampshire/CNN	Jul 8–15, 2019	386	± 5.0%	24%	2%	10%	1%	9%	0%	2%	–	19%	19%	1%	4% (Note: Bennet, Delaney, Gillibrand, and Williamson with 1%; de Blasio, Inslee, Moulton, Ryan, and Steyer with 0%)	9%
Saint Anselm College	Jul 10–12, 2019	351	± 5.2%	21%	1%	12%	1%	18%	3%	0%	–	10%	17%	5%	3% (Note: Williamson with 2%; Gillibrand with 1%; Inslee with 0%)	11%
Change Research	Jul 6–9, 2019	1,084	± 3.0%	19%	1%	13%	3%	15%	1%	1%	–	20%	22%	1%	3% (Note: Gillibrand, Hickenlooper, and Williamson with 1%; Bennet, de Blasio, Castro, Delaney, Inslee, Moulton, Ryan, and Swalwell with 0%)	–
Change Research	Jun 29 – Jul 4, 2019	420	–	13%	2%	14%	2%	13%	1%	2%	–	26%	24%	2%	4% (Note: Gillibrand, Gravel, Inslee, and Moulton with 1%; Bennet, Bullock, Castro, Delaney, Hickenlooper, Ryan, Swalwell, and Williamson with 0%)	–
Change Research	Jun 17–20, 2019	308	–	24%	0%	14%	1%	3%	1%	4%	–	28%	21%	1%	3% (Note: Delaney, Gravel, and Inslee with 1%; Bullock, Castro, de Blasio, Gillibrand, Hickenlooper, Messam, Moulton, Ryan, Swalwell, and Williamson with 0%)	–
YouGov/CBS News	May 31 – Jun 12, 2019	502	± 4.9%	33%	3%	10%	0%	7%	1%	4%	–	20%	17%	1%	2% (Note: Gillibrand and Hickenlooper with 1%; Bennet, Bullock, Castro, de Blasio, Delaney, Gravel, Inslee, Messam, Moulton, Ryan, Swalwell, and Williamson with 0%; others with 1%)	–
Tel Opinion Research*	May 20–22, 2019	600	± 4.0%	33%	–	7%	–	7%	–	1%	–	12%	11%	–	–	28%
Monmouth University	May 2–7, 2019	376	± 5.1%	36%	2%	9%	0%	6%	2%	2%	–	18%	8%	1%	2% (Note: Hickenlooper and Ryan with 1%; Bullock, Delaney, Gillibrand, and Williamson with <1%; Bennet, Castro, de Blasio, Gravel, Inslee, Messam, Moulton, and Swalwell with 0%)	11%
Change Research	May 3–5, 2019	864	± 3.3%	26%	2%	12%	1%	8%	1%	3%	–	30%	9%	2%	4% (Note: Delaney with 2%; Moulton, and Ryan with 1%; Abrams, Bennet, Bullock, Castro, Gillibrand, Gravel, Hickenlooper, Inslee, Swalwell, and Williamson with 0%)	–
Firehouse Strategies/Øptimus	Apr 30 – May 2, 2019	551	± 4.0%	34%	1%	10%	–	7%	1%	3%	–	16%	9%	–	–	19%
Suffolk University	Apr 25–28, 2019	429	± 4.7%	20%	3%	12%	1%	6%	1%	3%	–	12%	8%	1%	4% (Note: Delaney with 1%; Bennet, Bullock, Castro, de Blasio, Gillibrand, Gravel, Hickenlooper, Inslee, Messam, Moulton, Ryan, Swalwell, and Williamson with 0%; others with 0%)	27%
	Apr 25, 2019	Biden announces his candidacy														
University of New Hampshire	Apr 10–18, 2019	241	± 6.3%	18%	3%	15%	1%	4%	2%	3%	–	30%	5%	2%	5% (Note: Ryan with 2%; Gillibrand, Messam, and Swalwell with 1%; Castro, Delaney, Hickenlooper, Inslee, and Williamson with 0%; others with 0%)	12%
	Apr 14, 2019	Buttigieg announces his candidacy														
Saint Anselm College	Apr 3–8, 2019	326	± 5.4%	23%	4%	11%	1%	7%	2%	6%	–	16%	9%	–	9% (Note: Delaney, Gillibrand, and Hickenlooper with 1%; Inslee with 0%; others with 6%)	13%
	Mar 14, 2019	O'Rourke announces his candidacy														
University of New Hampshire	Feb 18–26, 2019	240	± 6.3%	22%	3%	1%	1%	10%	4%	5%	–	26%	7%	–	6% (Note: Bloomberg, Brown, and Gillibrand with 1%; Delaney and Hickenlooper with 0%; others with 3%)	14%
Emerson College	Feb 21–22, 2019	405	± 4.8%	25%	5%	1%	–	12%	8%	5%	–	27%	9%	–	10% (Note: Bloomberg with 2%; Brown, Delaney, and Gillibrand with 1%; Castro with 0%; others with 5%)	–
	Feb 19, 2019	Sanders announces his candidacy														
YouGov/UMass Amherst	Feb 7–15, 2019	337	± 6.4%	28%	3%	–	–	14%	1%	6%	–	20%	9%	–	9% (Note: Gillibrand with 3%; Bloomberg with 2%; Castro with 1%; others with 3%)	9%
	Feb 10, 2019	Klobuchar announces her candidacy														
	Feb 9, 2019	Warren announces her candidacy														
Firehouse Strategies/Øptimus	Jan 31 – Feb 2, 2019	518	± 4.1%	22%	4%	–	–	13%	2%	2%	–	13%	9%	–	0% (Note: Gillibrand with 0%)	35%
	Feb 1, 2019	Booker announces his candidacy														
	Jan 21, 2019	Harris announces her candidacy														
	Jan 11, 2019	Gabbard announces her candidacy														
Change Research	Jan 2–3, 2019	1,162	–	24%	3%	–	–	4%	2%	9%	–	26%	11%	–	22% (Note: Kennedy with 9%; Clinton with 3%; Bloomberg, Kerry, and Klobuchar with 2%; Brown, Bullock, Gillibrand, Hickenlooper, Ojeda, and Steyer with 1%; Castro, Cuomo, Delaney, Holder, Inslee, McAuliffe, Schultz, and Swalwell with 0%)	–
University of New Hampshire	Aug 2–19, 2018	198	± 7.0%	19%	6%	–	–	3%	–	–	–	30%	17%	–	12% (Note: Kennedy with 7%; Holder with 2%; O'Malley with 1%; Delaney, Gillibrand, and Hickenlooper with 0%; others with 2%)	12%
Suffolk University	Apr 26–30, 2018	295	± 5.7%	20%	8%	–	–	4%	–	–	4%	13%	26%	–	4% (Note: Gillibrand and McAuliffe with 2%)	18%
Suffolk University	Apr 26–30, 2018	295	± 5.7%	30%	10%	–	–	6%	–	–	8%	25%	–	–	6% (Note: Gillibrand with 3%; McAuliffe with 2%; others with 1%)	12%
University of New Hampshire	Apr 13–22, 2018	188	± 7.1%	26%	5%	–	–	6%	1%	–	–	28%	11%	–	9% (Note: Kennedy with 3%; O'Malley with 2%; Gillibrand and Hickenlooper with 1%; Ryan with 0%; others with 2%)	13%
University of New Hampshire	Jan 28 – Feb 10, 2018	219	± 6.6%	35%	3%	–	–	1%	0%	–	–	24%	15%	–	7% (Note: Gillibrand with 2%; O'Malley with 1%; others with 4%)	15%
	Nov 6, 2017	Yang announces his candidacy														
University of New Hampshire	Oct 3–15, 2017	212	± 6.7%	24%	6%	–	–	1%	1%	–	–	31%	13%	–	14% (Note: O'Malley with 3%; Hickenlooper and Zuckerberg with 2%; Gillibrand, and Ryan with 1%; Delaney with 0%; others with 5%)	11%

Head-to-head polls
Poll source	Date(s) administered	Sample size	Margin of error	Joe Biden	Pete Buttigieg	Bernie Sanders	Elizabeth Warren	Undecided
Tel Opinion Research	May 20–22, 2019	600	± 4.0%	63%	21%	–	–	15%
Tel Opinion Research	May 20–22, 2019	600	± 4.0%	66%	–	22%	–	13%
Tel Opinion Research	May 20–22, 2019	600	± 4.0%	58%	–	–	29%	13%
American Research Group	Mar 21–27, 2018	400	± 5.0%	47%	–	45%	–	7%
American Research Group	Mar 21–27, 2018	400	± 5.0%	58%	–	–	33%	8%

== Nevada caucus ==
The Nevada Democratic caucus was held on February 22, 2020.

Polling aggregation
Source of poll aggregation	Date updated	Dates polled	Bernie Sanders	Joe Biden	Pete Buttigieg	Elizabeth Warren	Tom Steyer	Amy Klobuchar	Others	Undecided
270 to Win	Feb 21, 2020	Feb 14–21, 2020	30.0%	16.7%	14.0%	13.7%	9.7%	9.7%	1.3% (Note: Gabbard with 1.3%; Bloomberg not reported)	4.9%
RealClear Politics	Feb 21, 2020	Feb 19–21, 2020	32.5%	16.0%	16.0%	14.0%	9.0%	9.5%	2.0% (Note: Gabbard with 2.0%; Bloomberg not reported)	1.0%
FiveThirtyEight	Feb 21, 2020	until Feb 21, 2020	30.5%	14.4%	15.3%	11.8%	10.2%	8.9%	11.0% (Note: Bloomberg with 9.1%; Gabbard with 1.9%)	– (Note: Individual candidate numbers add up to more than 100%)
Average			31.0%	15.7%	15.1%	13.2%	9.6%	9.4%	4.7% (Note: Bloomberg with 3.0%; Gabbard with 1.7%)	2.0%
Nevada caucus results, first alignment (February 22, 2020)			34.0%	17.6%	15.4%	12.8%	9.1%	9.6%	1.5% (Note: Uncommitted with 0.4%; Gabbard with 0.3%; Yang with 0.6%; Bennet and Patrick with 0.1%; Delaney with 0.0%)	–

– Debate qualifying poll as designated by the Democratic National Committee

Tabulation of individual polls of the 2020 Nevada Democratic Caucus
Poll source	Date(s) administered	Sample size	Margin of error	Joe Biden	Cory Booker	Pete Buttigieg	Kamala Harris	Amy Klobuchar	Beto O'Rourke	Bernie Sanders	Tom Steyer	Elizabeth Warren	Andrew Yang	Other	Undecided
Nevada caucuses (first alignment vote)	Feb 22, 2020	–	–	17.6%	–	15.4%	–	9.6%	–	34%	9.1%	12.8%	0.6%	1% (Note: Uncommitted with 0.4%; Gabbard with 0.3%; Bennet and Delaney with 0.1%; Patrick with 0%)	–
Data for Progress (Note: By the time of this poll, Data for Progress, which has worked with both the Sanders and Warren campaigns, had endorsed Warren)	Feb 19–21, 2020	1010 (LV)	± 2.8%	16%	–	15%	–	8%	–	35%	8%	16%	–	2% (Note: Gabbard with 2%)	–
AtlasIntel	Feb 19–21, 2020	517 (LV)	± 4.0%	11%	–	14%	–	5%	–	38%	11%	9%	–	7% (Note: Gabbard with 3%; "other" with 4%)	5%
Emerson College	Feb 19–20, 2020	425 (LV)	± 4.7%	16%	–	17%	–	11%	–	30%	10%	12%	–	4% (Note: Gabbard with 2%; someone else with 2%)	–
	Feb 15–18, 2020	Early voting occurred in the Nevada caucuses													
Point Blank Political	Feb 13–15, 2020	256 (LV)	± 5.6%	14.3%	–	12.6%	–	15.6%	–	13%	18.6%	7.1%	–	1.7% (Note: Gabbard with 1.7%)	17.1%
Beacon Research/Tom Steyer	Feb 12–15, 2020	600 (LV)	–	19%	–	13%	–	7%	–	24%	18%	10%	–	4% (Note: others with 4%)	6%
Data for Progress (Note: By the time of this poll, Data for Progress, which has worked with both the Sanders and Warren campaigns, had endorsed Warren)	Feb 12–15, 2020	766 (LV)	± 3.4%	14%	–	15%	–	9%	–	35%	10%	16%	–	2% (Note: Gabbard with 2%)	–
WPA Intelligence/Las Vegas Review-Journal/AARP Nevada	Feb 11–13, 2020	413 (LV)	± 4.8%	18%	–	10%	–	10%	–	25%	11%	13%	–	5% (Note: Gabbard with 0%; Other with 5%)	8%
	Feb 11, 2020	New Hampshire primary; Yang withdraws from the race after close of polls													
	Jan 13, 2020	Booker withdraws from the race													
Suffolk University/USA Today	Jan 8–11, 2020	500 (LV)	± 4.4%	19%	2%	8%	–	4%	–	18%	8%	11%	4%	4% (Note: Delaney and Gabbard with 1%; Patrick with 0%; Bennet and Williamson with no voters; other with 0%; refused with 2%)	22%
https://www.yang2020.com/wp-content/uploads/Myers-Research-Nevada.pdf Archived January 11, 2020, at the Wayback Machine	Jan 5–8, 2020	635	± 4.0%	23%	3%	6%	–	2%	–	17%	12%	12%	4%	13% (Note: Bloomberg and Gabbard with 2%; Williamson with 1%; Bennet, Delaney, and Patrick with 0%; others with 0%; none with 8%)	6%
	Dec 3, 2019	Harris withdraws from the race													
YouGov/CBS News	Nov 6–13, 2019	708 (RV)	± 4.7%	33%	2%	9%	4%	2%	–	23%	2%	21%	1%	2% (Note: Castro with 1%; Bennet, Bullock, Delaney, Gabbard, Messam, Sestak, and Williamson with 0%; "Someone else" with 1%)	–
Fox News	Nov 10–13, 2019	627	± 4.0%	24%	1%	8%	4%	2%	–	18%	5%	18%	3%	4% (Note: Gabbard with 2%; Castro with 1%; Bennet, Bullock, Delaney, Messam, Sestak and Williamson with 0%; others with 1%; none with 2%)	10%
Emerson Polling	Oct 31 – Nov 2, 2019	451 (LV)	± 4.6%	30%	1%	5%	5%	1%	–	19%	3%	22%	5%	10% (Note: Bennet, Castro, and Gabbard with 1%; Bullock, Delaney, Sestak and Williamson with 0%; someone else with 7%)	–
Mellman Group/The Nevada Independent	Oct 28 – Nov 2, 2019	600 (LV)	± 4.0%	29%	1%	7%	3%	3%	0%	19%	4%	19%	3%	3% (Note: Castro, Gabbard and Williamson with 1%; Bennet, Bullock, Delaney and Sestak with 0%)	9%
	Nov 1, 2019	O'Rourke withdraws from the race													
CNN/SSRS	Sep 22–26, 2019	324 (LV)	± 7.1%	22%	2%	4%	5%	1%	0%	22%	4%	18%	3%	3% (Note: Gabbard, Ryan, and Williamson with 1%; Bennet, Bullock, Castro, Delaney, and Sestak with 0%)	13%
Suffolk University/USA Today	Sep 19–23, 2019	500 (LV)	–	23%	2%	3%	4%	0%	1%	14%	3%	19%	3%	4% (Note: Bennet, Bullock, Castro and Gabbard with 1%; de Blasio, Delaney, Messam, Ryan, Sestak and Williamson with 0%; "refused" with 1%)	21%
YouGov/CBS News	Aug 28 – Sep 4, 2019	563 (LV)	± 4.9%	27%	1%	4%	6%	0%	3%	29%	2%	18%	1%	9% (Note: Castro with 2%; de Blasio, Delaney, Gabbard, Ryan, and Sestak with 1%; Bennet, Bullock, Messam, and Williamson with 0%; others with 2%)	–
Gravis Marketing	Aug 14–16, 2019	382 (RV)	± 5.0%	25%	3%	5%	9%	2%	0%	10%	6%	15%	2%	13% (Note: Bennet, de Blasio, and Gabbard with 2%; Bullock, Castro, Delaney, Gillibrand, Inslee, Ryan, and Williamson with 1%)	9%
Change Research	Aug 2–8, 2019	439 (LV)	± 4.7%	26%	0%	7%	10%	1%	2%	22%	3%	23%	1%	5% (Note: Castro, Gabbard, Gillibrand, and Inslee with 1%; Bennet, Booker, Bullock, Hickenlooper, and Williamson with 0%)	–
Morning Consult	Jul 1–21, 2019	749 (RV)	± 4.0%	29%	3%	6%	11%	1%	3%	23%	1%	12%	3%	10% (Note: Castro with 2%; Bullock, de Blasio, and Ryan with 1%; others with 4%)	–
	Jul 9, 2019	Steyer announces his candidacy													
Monmouth University	Jun 6–11, 2019	370 (LV)	± 5.1%	36%	2%	7%	6%	1%	2%	13%	–	19%	2%	3% (Note: Castro, Gabbard, and Williamson with 1%; Bullock, Hickenlooper, Inslee, Messam, and Ryan with <1%; Bennet, de Blasio, Delaney, Gillibrand, Gravel, Moulton, and Swalwell with 0%)	8%
Change Research	May 9–12, 2019	389 (LV)	–	29%	2%	13%	11%	1%	4%	24%	–	12%	1%	4% (Note: Abrams, Castro, Gabbard, and Swalwell with 1%; Gillibrand, Hickenlooper, Inslee, and Ryan with 0%)	–
	Apr 25, 2019	Biden announces his candidacy													
	Apr 14, 2019	Buttigieg announces his candidacy													
Emerson College	Mar 28–30, 2019	310 (LV)	± 5.5%	26%	2%	5%	9%	2%	10%	23%	–	10%	3%	9% (Note: Gabbard with 2%; Castro and Gillibrand with 1%; Hickenlooper and Inslee with 0%; others with 6%)	–

== South Carolina primary ==
The South Carolina Democratic primary was held on February 29, 2020.

Polling aggregation
Source of poll aggregation	Date updated	Dates polled	Joe Biden	Bernie Sanders	Tom Steyer	Pete Buttigieg	Elizabeth Warren	Amy Klobuchar	Tulsi Gabbard	Un- decided (Note: Calculated by taking the difference of 100% and all other candidates combined; Bloomberg included as write-in votes are not permitted in SC primaries)
270 to Win	Feb 28, 2020	Feb 23–27, 2020	35.8%	20.2%	13.4%	10.0%	8.2%	5.0%	2.6%	4.8%
RealClear Politics	Feb 28, 2020	Feb 23–27, 2020	39.7%	24.3%	11.7%	11.3%	6.0%	5.7%	2.3%	– (Note: Candidate percentages add up to more than 100%)
FiveThirtyEight	Feb 28, 2020	until Feb 27, 2020	38.4%	19.1%	12.4%	8.5%	7.0%	4.3%	2.6%	7.7% (Note: Bloomberg 10.3%; Write-in votes are not permitted in SC primaries; this appears to be based on trendline regression)
Average			38.0%	21.2%	12.5%	9.9%	7.1%	5.0%	2.5%	4.9% (Note: Bloomberg only in 538, so no average can be made)
South Carolina primary results (February 29, 2020)			48.7%	19.8%	11.3%	8.2%	7.1%	3.1%	1.3%	–

– Debate qualifying poll as designated by the Democratic National Committee

Polling in January and February 2020
Poll source	Date(s) administered	Sample size	Margin of error	Joe Biden	Michael Bloomberg	Pete Buttigieg	Tulsi Gabbard	Amy Klobuchar	Bernie Sanders	Tom Steyer	Elizabeth Warren	Andrew Yang	Other	Undecided
South Carolina primary (popular vote)	Feb 29, 2020	–	–	48.65%	–	8.2%	1.26%	3.13%	19.77%	11.34%	7.07%	0.2%	0.38% (Note: Bennet with 0.14%; Booker with 0.12%; Delaney with 0.07%; Patrick with 0.05%)	–
Atlas Intel	Feb 25–28, 2020	477 (LV)	± 4.0%	35%	–	8%	2%	4%	24%	12%	7%	–	2%	6%
Emerson College	Feb 26–27, 2020	550 (LV)	± 4.1%	41%	–	11%	2%	6%	25%	11%	5%	–	–	–
Trafalgar Group	Feb 26–27, 2020	1,081 (LV)	± 2.99%	43.9%	–	9.6%	1.7%	5.9%	22.8%	10.5%	5.6%	–	–	–
Data for Progress	Feb 23–27, 2020	1416 (LV)	± 2.6%	34%	–	13%	3%	5%	25%	13%	7%	–	–	–
Change Research / Post and Courier	Feb 23–27, 2020	543 (LV)	± 5.1%	28%	–	11%	5%	4%	24%	16%	12%	–	–	1%
Starboard Communications	Feb 26, 2020	1,102 (LV)	± 2.82%	40%	–	9%	2%	6%	11%	12%	9%	–	–	12%
	Feb 25, 2020	Tenth Democratic primary debate												
Monmouth University	Feb 23–25, 2020	454 (LV)	± 4.6%	36%	–	6%	1%	4%	16%	15%	8%	–	0%	15%
Clemson University	Feb 17–25, 2020	650 (LV)	± 3.8%	35%	–	8%	2%	4%	13%	17%	8%	–	–	12%
East Carolina University	Feb 23–24, 2020	1,142 (LV)	± 3.37%	31%	–	6%	2%	2%	23%	20%	8%	–	–	8%
Public Policy Polling	Feb 23–24, 2020	866 (LV)	± 3.3%	36%	–	7%	6%	3%	21%	7%	8%	–	–	11% (Note: Reported as "Someone else/Undecided")
	Feb 22, 2020	Nevada caucuses												
YouGov/CBS News	Feb 20–22, 2020	1,238 (LV)	± 5.5%	28%	–	10%	1%	4%	23%	18%	12%	–	3% (Note: "Someone else" with 3%)	1%
Marist Poll/NBC News	Feb 18–21, 2020	539 (LV)	± 6.0%	27%	–	9%	3%	5%	23%	15%	8%	–	2% (Note: "Other" with 2%)	9%
Marist Poll/NBC News	Feb 18–21, 2020	997 (RV)	± 4.0%	25%	–	9%	3%	5%	24%	15%	8%	–	2% (Note: "Other" with 2%)	9%
Winthrop University	Feb 9–19, 2020	443 (LV)	± 4.7%	24%	–	7%	1%	4%	19%	15%	6%	1% (Note: Accumulated responses until he withdrew; name not included afterwards.)	2% (Note: "Someone else" with 2%; Bennet and Patrick were included until they withdrew; Bennet received no voters; Patrick accumulated few enough to round down to 0%)	22%
University of Massachusetts Lowell	Feb 12–18, 2020	400 (LV)	± 7.5%	23%	–	11%	4%	9%	21%	13%	11%	–	4% (Note: "Another candidate" with 4%)	4%
Change Research/The Welcome Party	Feb 12–14, 2020	1015 (LV)	–	23%	–	15%	1%	8%	23%	20%	9%	–	–	1%
East Carolina University	Feb 12–13, 2020	703 (LV)	± 4.3%	28%	6%	8%	1%	7%	20%	14%	7%	–	0%	8%
	Feb 11–12, 2020	New Hampshire primary; Yang withdraws from the race.												
	Feb 3, 2020	Iowa caucus												
Zogby Analytics	Jan 31 – Feb 3, 2020	277 (LV)	± 5.9%	28%	4%	7%	4%	2%	20%	15%	11%	1%	0% (Note: Bennet and Patrick with 0%)	8%
East Carolina University	Jan 31 – Feb 2, 2020	469 (LV)	± 5.3%	37%	1%	4%	2%	2%	14%	19%	8%	3%	0% (Note: Bennet and Patrick with 0%)	10%
Change Research/ Post and Courier	Jan 26–29, 2020	651 (LV)	± 4%	25%	–	7%	3%	2%	20%	18%	11%	3%	1% (Note: Delaney with 1%; Bennet and Patrick with 0%)	10%
	Jan 13, 2020	Booker withdraws from the race												
GQR Research/Unite the Country (Note: The poll's sponsor, Unite the Country, is a pro-Biden super PAC.)	Jan 9–13, 2020	600 (LV)	–	36% (Note: data from 538.com)	– (Note: not released)	5% (Note: data from 538.com)	– (Note: not released)	– (Note: not released)	15% (Note: data from 538.com)	12% (Note: data from 538.com)	10% (Note: data from 538.com)	– (Note: not released)	– (Note: not released)	– (Note: not released)
Fox News	Jan 5–8, 2020	808 (RV)	± 3.5%	36%	2%	4%	1%	1%	14%	15%	10%	2%	3% (Note: Booker with 2%; Bennet, Delaney, Patrick, and Williamson with 0%; "None of the above" with 1%)	11%

Polling before January 2020
Poll source	Date(s) administered	Sample size	Margin of error	Joe Biden	Cory Booker	Pete Buttigieg	Kamala Harris	Beto O'Rourke	Bernie Sanders	Tom Steyer	Elizabeth Warren	Other	Undecided
Change Research/ Post and Courier	Dec 6–11, 2019	392 (LV)	± 4.9%	27%	5%	9%	–	–	20%	5%	19%	13% (Note: Gabbard with 4%; Bloomberg with 3%; Klobuchar and Yang with 2%; Patrick and Williamson with 1%; Bennet, Castro and Delaney with 0%)	–
	Dec 3, 2019	Harris withdraws from the race											
YouGov/FairVote	Nov 22 – Dec 2, 2019	400 (LV)	± 7.5%	39%	2%	10%	2%	–	13%	7%	10%	13% (Note: Gabbard with 4%; Yang with 3%; Bloomberg and Klobuchar with 2%; Delaney and Patrick with 1%; Bennet, Sestak and Williamson with 0%; Bullock and Castro with no voters)	4%
Quinnipiac University	Nov 13–17, 2019	768 (LV)	± 4.8%	33%	2%	6%	3%	–	11%	5%	13%	7% (Note: Yang with 4%; Gabbard, Klobuchar and Williamson with 1%; Bennet, Bullock, Castro, Delaney, Messam, Patrick and Sestak with 0%)	18%
YouGov/CBS News	Nov 6–13, 2019	933 (RV)	± 4.2%	45%	2%	8%	5%	–	15%	2%	17%	6% (Note: Bullock, Delaney, Gabbard, and Klobuchar with 1%; Bennet, Castro, Messam, Sestak, Williamson, and Yang with 0%; someone else with 2%)	–
University of North Florida	Nov 5–13, 2019	426 (LV)	–	36%	2%	3%	4%	–	10%	8%	10%	6% (Note: Bloomberg, Gabbard, Klobuchar, Williamson and Yang with 1%; Bennet, Bullock, Castro, Delaney, Messam and Sestak with 0%; someone else with 1%)	23%
	Nov 1, 2019	O'Rourke withdraws from the race											
Monmouth University	Oct 16–21, 2019	402 (LV)	± 4.9%	33%	2%	3%	6%	1%	12%	4%	16%	7% (Note: Klobuchar and Yang with 2%; Castro, Delaney and Gabbard with 1%; Bennet, Bullock, Ryan, Sestak and Williamson with 0%)	15%
Change Research/ Post and Courier	Oct 15–21, 2019	731 (LV)	± 3.6%	30%	3%	9%	11%	1%	13%	5%	19%	11% (Note: Yang with 4%; Gabbard and Klobuchar with 3%; Bennet with 1%; Bullock, Castro, Delaney, Ryan and Williamson with 0%)	–
Firehouse Strategies/ Øptimus	Oct 8–10, 2019	607 (LV)	± 3.7%	32%	2%	4%	5%	1%	8%	–	16%	33% (Note: Yang with 2%)	– (Note: The poll did not announce this result separately; it is listed as part of 'Other'.)
YouGov/CBS News	Oct 3–11, 2019	915 (RV)	±3.9%	43%	3%	4%	7%	1%	16%	2%	18%	6% (Note: Bennet, Klobuchar, Ryan, Williamson, and Yang with 1%; Bullock, Castro, Delaney, Gabbard, Messam, and Sestak with 0%; "someone else" with 0%)	–
Gravis Marketing	Oct 3–7, 2019	516 (LV)	± 4.3%	34%	6%	0%	4%	2%	10%	7%	9%	10% (Note: Bullock, Klobuchar and Yang with 2%; Castro, Delaney, Gabbard and Williamson with 1%; Bennet and Ryan with 0%)	19%
Fox News	Sep 29 – Oct 2, 2019	803 (LV)	± 3.5%	41%	3%	2%	4%	0%	10%	4%	12%	8% (Note: Bennet, Gabbard, Ryan, Williamson and Yang with 1%; Bullock, Castro, Delaney, Klobuchar, and Messam with < 0.5%; Sestak with 0%; someone else with 3%)	16%
Winthrop University	Sep 21–30, 2019	462 (RV)	± 4.9%	37%	3%	4%	7%	2%	8%	2%	17%	6% (Note: Yang with 2%; Gabbard, Klobuchar, Castro and "Someone else" with 1%; Delaney, Sestak and Bennet with 0%; Bullock, Messam, Ryan and Williamson with less than 0.5%)	12%
CNN/SSRS	Sep 22–26, 2019	406 (LV)	± 5.9%	37%	2%	4%	3%	2%	11%	3%	16%	4% (Note: Bennet, Klobuchar, Gabbard, and Williamson with 1%; Bullock, Castro, Delaney, Gabbard, Ryan, and Yang with 0%)	10%
YouGov/CBS News	Aug 28 – Sep 4, 2019	849 (RV) (Note: poll results among likely voters of this RV sample)	± 4.3%	43%	2%	4%	7%	1%	18%	1%	14%	9% (Note: de Blasio, Bullock, Delaney, Gabbard, Klobuchar, Ryan, and Yang with 1%; Bennet, Castro, Messam, Sestak and Williamson with 0%; someone else with 2%)	–
Change Research	Aug 9–12, 2019	521 (LV)	± 4.3%	36%	4%	5%	12%	1%	16%	1%	17%	7% (Note: Gabbard with 2%; Castro, Delaney, Klobuchar, Ryan, and Yang with 1%; Bennet, Bullock, de Blasio, Gillibrand, Inslee, Messam, and Williamson with 0%)	–
Firehouse Strategies/ Øptimus	Jul 23–25, 2019	554 (LV)	± 3.8%	31%	2%	4%	10%	0%	9%	–	12%	8% (Note: Yang with 1%; "A different Democratic candidate" with 7%)	24%
Monmouth University	Jul 18–22, 2019	405 (LV)	± 4.9%	39%	2%	5%	12%	1%	10%	2%	9%	3% (Note: Bennet and Klobuchar with 1%; Castro, de Blasio, Gabbard, Gillibrand, and Inslee with <1%; Bullock, Delaney, Gravel, Hickenlooper, Messam, Moulton, Ryan, Sestak, Williamson, and Yang with 0%)	17%
YouGov/CBS News	Jul 9–18, 2019	997 (RV) (Note: poll results among likely voters of this RV sample)	± 3.8%	39%	3%	5%	12%	2%	17%	1%	12%	9% (Note: Delaney, Hickenlooper, Inslee, Klobuchar, Ryan, Williamson, and Yang with 1%; Bennet, Bullock, Castro, de Blasio, Gabbard, Gillibrand, Gravel, Messam, Moulton, and Sestak with 0%)	–
Fox News	Jul 7–10, 2019	701 (LV)	± 3.5%	35%	3%	2%	12%	0%	14%	0%	5%	3% (Note: Delaney, Williamson, and Yang with 1%; Bennet, de Blasio, Bullock, Castro, Gabbard, Gillibrand, Hickenlooper, Inslee, Klobuchar, Messam, Moulton, Ryan, and Sestak with 0%)	20%
	Jul 9, 2019	Steyer announces his candidacy											
Change Research	Jun 29 – Jul 4, 2019	421 (LV)	–	27%	6%	6%	21%	1%	16%	0%	15%	8% (Note: Gabbard with 2%; Bennet, Bullock, Castro, Delaney, Hickenlooper, Williamson, and Yang with 1%; Gravel, Inslee, Moulton, Ryan, and Swalwell with 0%)	–
Change Research	Jun 17–20, 2019	308 (LV)	–	39%	5%	11%	9%	5%	13%	0%	15%	5% (Note: Yang with 2%; Bullock, de Blasio, and Ryan with 1%; Castro, Delaney, Gabbard, Gillibrand, Gravel, Hickenlooper, Inslee, Klobuchar, Messam, Moulton, Swalwell, and Williamson with 0%)	–
Change Research	Jun 11–14, 2019	933 (LV)	± 3.2%	37%	5%	11%	9%	4%	9%	–	17%	8% (Note: Yang with 3%; de Blasio, Gabbard, Gillibrand, Klobuchar, and Williamson with 1%; Bennet, Delaney, Gravel, Hickenlooper, Messam, Moulton, Ryan, and Swalwell with 0%)	–
YouGov/CBS News	May 31 – Jun 12, 2019	552 (LV)	–	45%	4%	6%	7%	4%	18%	–	8%	8% (Note: Gillibrand, Gravel, Klobuchar, Messam, and Yang with 1%; Bennet, Bullock, Castro, de Blasio, Delaney, Gabbard, Hickenlooper, Inslee, Moulton, Ryan, Swalwell, and Williamson with 0%; others with 3%)	–
Zogby Analytics	May 23–29, 2019	183 (LV)	± 7.2%	36%	4%	7%	4%	2%	13%	–	12%	4% (Note: Gillibrand with 2%; Castro, Gabbard, Hickenlooper, and Inslee with 1%; Delaney, Klobuchar, and Yang with 0%)	–
Tel Opinion Research*	May 22–24, 2019	600 (LV)	± 4.0%	37%	2%	3%	7%	–	10%	–	8%	–	32%
Crantford Research	May 14–16, 2019	381 (LV)	± 5.0%	42%	4%	8%	10%	–	7%	–	8%	–	–
Change Research	May 6–9, 2019	595 (LV)	± 4.0%	46%	4%	8%	10%	2%	15%	–	8%	5% (Note: Yang with 2%; Abrams, Klobuchar, and Williamson with 1%; Bennet, Castro, Delaney, Gabbard, Gillibrand, Hickenlooper, Inslee, Ryan, and Swalwell with 0%)	–
Firehouse Strategies/ Øptimus	Apr 30 – May 2, 2019	568 (LV)	± 4.5%	48%	4%	5%	4%	1%	12%	–	5%	1% (Note: Klobuchar with 1%)	20%
	Apr 25, 2019	Biden announces his candidacy											
	Apr 14, 2019	Buttigieg announces his candidacy											
Change Research	Mar 31 – Apr 4, 2019	744 (LV)	± 3.6%	32%	9%	7%	10%	9%	14%	–	6%	12% (Note: Abrams with 7%; Castro, Gillibrand, Hickenlooper, Klobuchar, and Yang with 1%; Bennet, Delaney, Gabbard, Inslee, McAuliffe, Swalwell, and Williamson with 0%)	–
Change Research	Mar 31 – Apr 4, 2019	744 (LV)	± 3.6%	–	12%	12%	15%	16%	24%	–	11%	12% (Note: Castro, Gillibrand, Hickenlooper, and Klobuchar with 2%; Delaney, Inslee, Messam, and Yang with 1%; Gabbard and Williamson with 0%)	–
	Mar 14, 2019	O'Rourke announces his candidacy											
Emerson College	Feb 28 – Mar 2, 2019	291 (LV)	± 5.7%	37%	6%	0%	9%	5%	21%	–	5%	16% (Note: Gillibrand with 3%; Bloomberg and Gabbard with 2%: Brown and Klobuchar with 1%; Castro, and Delaney with 0%; others with 8%)	–
Change Research	Feb 15–18, 2019	600 (LV)	± 4.0%	36%	10%	–	13%	8%	14%	–	9%	12% (Note: Brown and Holder with 2%; Bloomberg, Castro, Gabbard, Gillibrand, Hickenlooper, Klobuchar, Swalwell, and Yang with 1%; Bennet, Cuomo, de Blasio, Delaney, McAuliffe, and Williamson with 0%)	–
Change Research	Feb 15–18, 2019	600 (LV)	± 4.0%	–	28%	1%	35%	–	–	–	20%	18% (Note: Klobuchar with 5%; Castro with 4%; Delaney with 3%; Gabbard and Williamson with 2%; Gillibrand and Yang with 1%)	–
	Feb 19, 2019	Sanders announces his candidacy											
	Feb 9, 2019	Warren announces her candidacy											
Firehouse Strategies/ Øptimus	Jan 31 – Feb 2, 2019	557 (LV)	± 4.0%	36%	5%	–	12%	2%	8%	–	4%	2% (Note: Klobuchar with 1%; Gillibrand with 0%)	31%

Head-to-head polling
Poll source	Date(s) administered	Sample size	Margin of error	Joe Biden	Pete Buttigieg	Bernie Sanders	Elizabeth Warren	Other	Undecided
YouGov/FairVote (Note: But for the Biden vs Warren matchup, 'undecided' and 'other' voters are not included in the listed percentages for this poll.)	Nov 22 – Dec 2, 2019	400 (LV)	± 7.5%	73%	27%	–	–	–	–
YouGov/FairVote	Nov 22 – Dec 2, 2019	400 (LV)	± 7.5%	66%	–	34%	–	–	–
YouGov/FairVote	Nov 22 – Dec 2, 2019	400 (LV)	± 7.5%	61%	–	–	29%	(Note: Would not vote with 4%)	6%
YouGov/FairVote	Nov 22 – Dec 2, 2019	400 (LV)	± 7.5%	–	39%	61%	–	–	–
YouGov/FairVote	Nov 22 – Dec 2, 2019	400 (LV)	± 7.5%	–	36%	–	64%	–	–
YouGov/FairVote	Nov 22 – Dec 2, 2019	400 (LV)	± 7.5%	–	–	54%	46%	–	–
Tel Opinion Research	May 22–24, 2019	600	± 4.0%	71%	10%	–	–	–	19%
Tel Opinion Research	May 22–24, 2019	600	± 4.0%	70%	–	15%	–	–	16%
Tel Opinion Research	May 22–24, 2019	600	± 4.0%	67%	–	–	15%	–	18%

== Alabama primary ==
The Alabama Democratic primary was held on March 3, 2020.

Polling aggregation
Source of poll aggregation	Date updated	Dates polled	Joe Biden	Bernie Sanders	Michael Bloomberg	Elizabeth Warren	Tulsi Gabbard	Other/ Undecided
270 to Win	March 3, 2020	February 28 – March 2, 2020	44.5%	21.0%	18.0%	11.0%	1.0%	4.5%
RealClear Politics	March 3, 2020	Insufficient recent polling to supply an average.						
FiveThirtyEight	March 3, 2020	until March 2, 2020	40.2%	18.4%	15.9%	10.9%	0.5%	14.1%
Average			42.35%	19.7%	16.95%	10.95%	0.75%	9.3%
Alabama primary results (March 3, 2020)			63.3%	16.5%	11.7%	5.7%	0.2%	2.6%

Tabulation of individual polls of the 2020 Alabama Democratic Primary
Poll source	Date(s) administered	Sample size	Margin of error	Joe Biden	Michael Bloomberg	Cory Booker	Pete Buttigieg	Kamala Harris	Beto O'Rourke	Bernie Sanders	Elizabeth Warren	Other	Undecided
	Mar 1–2, 2020	Buttigieg and Klobuchar withdraw from the race											
Swayable	Mar 1–2, 2020	949 (LV)	± 5.0%	42%	18%	–	3%	–	–	20%	10%	8% (Note: Steyer with 2%; Klobuchar with 1%; Gabbard with 0%; "Other" with 5%)	–
Data for Progress	Feb 28 – Mar 2, 2020	237 (LV)	± 6.4%	47%	18%	–	–	–	–	22%	12%	2% (Note: Gabbard with 2%)	–
	Jan 13, 2020	Booker withdraws from the race											
	Dec 3, 2019	Harris withdraws from the race											
	Nov 1, 2019	O'Rourke withdraws from the race											
SurveyMonkey	July 2–16, 2019	257	± 7.8%	36%	–	2%	5%	13%	1%	15%	9%	10% (Note: Sestak with 3%; Bennet with 2%; de Blasio, Bullock, Delaney, Williamson, and Yang with 1%; Castro, Gabbard, Gillibrand, Gravel, Hickenlooper, Inslee, Klobuchar, Messam, Moulton, and Ryan with 0%)	–
Change Research	March 20–23, 2019	1,200	± 2.8%	42%	–	9%	3%	12%	10%	13%	6%	4% (Note: Castro, Klobuchar, Moulton, and Yang with 1%; Bennet, Bullock, Cuomo, de Blasio, Delaney, Gabbard, Gillibrand, Hickenlooper, Inslee, Messam, Swalwell, and Williamson with 0%)	–
Change Research	March 20–23, 2019	1,200	± 2.8%	–	–	14%	4%	16%	17%	27%	12%	9% (Note: Klobuchar with 2%; Castro, Delaney, Gabbard, Gillibrand, Hickenlooper, Inslee, and Yang with 1%; Messam and Williamson with 0%)	–

== Arkansas primary ==
The Arkansas Democratic primary was held on March 3, 2020.

Polling Aggregation
Source of poll aggregation	Date updated	Dates polled	Joe Biden	Michael Bloomberg	Bernie Sanders	Elizabeth Warren	Tulsi Gabbard	Other/ Undecided
270 to Win	March 3, 2020	February 6–March 2, 2020	27.7%	22.3%	18.7%	11.3%	0.5%	19.5%
RealClear Politics	March 3, 2020	Insufficient recent polling to supply an average.						
FiveThirtyEight	March 3, 2020	until March 2, 2020	27.5%	21.0%	18.1%	12.5%	0.3%	20.6%
Average			27.6%	21.65%	18.4%	11.9%	0.4%	20.05%
Arkansas primary results (March 3, 2020)			40.5%	16.7%	22.4%	10.0%	0.7%	9.7%

Tabulation of individual polls of the 2020 Arkansas Democratic Primary
Poll source	Date(s) administered	Sample size	Margin of error	Joe Biden	Michael Bloomberg	Pete Buttigieg	Bernie Sanders	Elizabeth Warren	Other	Undecided
	Mar 1–2, 2020	Buttigieg and Klobuchar withdraw from the race								
Swayable	Mar 1–2, 2020	714 (LV)	± 6.0%	28%	25%	8%	17%	10%	13% (Note: Klobuchar with 7%; Steyer with 1%; Gabbard with 0%; "Other" with 5%)	–
Data for Progress	Feb 28–Mar 2, 2020	300 (LV)	± 5.6%	36%	22%	2%	23%	15%	2% (Note: Klobuchar and Gabbard with 1%)	–
The Progress Campaign (D)	Feb 21–25, 2020	209 (RV)	± 4.9%	17%	17%	18%	19%	12%	6% (Note: Klobuchar with 6%)	10% (Note: Listed as "undecided/would not vote")
Hendrix College/Talk Business & Politics	February 6–7, 2020	496 (LV)	± 4.3%	18.5%	19.6%	15.5%	16.4%	8.9%	10.1% (Note: Klobuchar with 4.8%; Yang with 2%; "someone else" with 3.3%)	11%

== California primary ==
The California Democratic primary was held on March 3, 2020.

Polling aggregation
Source of poll aggregation	Date updated	Dates polled	Bernie Sanders	Joe Biden	Elizabeth Warren	Michael Bloomberg	Tulsi Gabbard	Other/ Undecided
270 to Win	March 3, 2020	February 20 – March 1, 2020	33.0%	20.0%	14.4%	15.0%	1.2%	16.4%
RealClear Politics	March 3, 2020	February 28 – March 2, 2020	35.0%	23.0%	16.0%	14.0%	1.5%	10.5% (Note: includes Buttigieg with 6.0%; Klobuchar with 4.0%; Steyer not averaged)
FiveThirtyEight	March 3, 2020	until March 2, 2020	31.2%	21.7%	14.9%	14.7%	0.7%	16.8%
Average			33.1%	21.6%	15.1%	14.6%	1.1%	14.5%
California primary results (March 3, 2020)			36.0%	27.9%	13.2%	12.1%	0.6%	10.2%

Polling from January 1 to March 3, 2020
Poll source	Date(s) administered	Sample size	Margin of error	Joe Biden	Michael Bloomberg	Pete Buttigieg	Amy Klobuchar	Bernie Sanders	Tom Steyer	Elizabeth Warren	Andrew Yang	Other	Undecided
	March 2, 2020	Klobuchar withdraws from the race.											
Swayable	March 1–2, 2020	3,388 (LV)	± 2.0%	20.8%	19.3%	8.4%	3.3%	28.7%	4.0%	9.6%	–	6.0% (Note: Gabbard with 0.1%; "Other" with 5.9%)	–
Data for Progress	February 28 – March 2, 2020	516 (LV)	± 4.3%	25%	17%	5%	3%	32%	–	16%	–	1% (Note: Gabbard with 1%)	–
AtlasIntel	February 24 – March 2, 2020	727 (LV)	± 4.0%	26%	15%	3%	1%	34%	–	15%	–	2% (Note: Gabbard with 1%; "Other" with 1%)	4%
	March 1, 2020	Buttigieg withdraws from the race.											
Point Blank Political	February 29 – March 1, 2020	1,220 (LV)	± 4.1%	22%	10%	6%	3%	34%	1%	14%	–	1% (Note: Gabbard with 1%)	9%
Emerson College/Nexstar	February 29 – March 1, 2020	545 (LV)	± 4.1%	21%	11%	7%	5%	38%	2%	16%	–	1% (Note: Gabbard with 1%)	–
	February 29, 2020	South Carolina primary; Steyer withdraws from the race after close of polls.											
YouGov/CBS News	February 27–29, 2020	1,411 (LV)	± 4.0%	19%	12%	9%	4%	31%	3%	18%	–	4% (Note: Gabbard with 1%; "Someone else" with 3%)	–
Suffolk University	February 26–29, 2020	500 (LV)	± 4.4%	14%	16%	7%	5%	35%	3%	12%	–	3% (Note: Gabbard with 3%)	–
YouGov/Hoover; Institution/Stanford University	February 26–28, 2020	1,020 (LV)	–	19%	13%	9%	6%	28%	4%	18%	–	3% (Note: Gabbard with 3%)	–
Point Blank Political	February 26–28, 2020	2,276 (LV)	± 2.9%	14%	12%	9%	3%	34%	3%	14%	–	1% (Note: Gabbard with 1%)	10%
Point Blank Political	February 26–28, 2020	2,276 (LV)	± 2.9%	40% (Note: If only the two candidates for which percentages are listed could be voted for)	–	–	–	50%	–	–	–	–	11%
Point Blank Political	February 26–28, 2020	2,276 (LV)	± 2.9%	–	32% (Note: If only the two candidates for which percentages are listed could be voted for)	–	–	57%	–	–	–	–	11%
Point Blank Political	February 26–28, 2020	2,276 (LV)	± 2.9%	–	–	–	–	46% (Note: If only the two candidates for which percentages are listed could be voted for)	–	36%	–	–	16%
CNN/SSRS	February 22–26, 2020	488 (LV)	± 5.2%	13%	12%	7%	6%	35%	3%	14%	–	3% (Note: Gabbard with 1%; "Someone else" with 0%; "None/No one" with 2%)	8%
	February 25, 2020	Tenth Democratic primary debate											
Point Blank Political	February 23–25, 2020	2,098 (LV)	± 3.0%	11%	11%	9%	4%	34%	3%	13%	–	2% (Note: Gabbard with 2%)	13%
Berkeley IGS/LA Times	Feb 20–25, 2020	3,002 (LV)	± 2.0%	8%	12%	11%	6%	34%	2%	17%	1%	2% (Note: Gabbard with 1%; "Others" with 1%)	7%
	February 22, 2020	Nevada caucuses											
Change Research/KQED News	February 20–23, 2020	1,069 (LV)	± 3.4%	12%	6%	11%	5%	37%	3%	20%	4% (Note: Included in poll despite being withdrawn because he is still on the ballot.)	3% (Note: Gabbard with 2%; Castro with 1%; Bennet, Williamson, Patrick, Sestak, Delaney, Greenstein, Ellinger, Boyd, and De La Fuente with 0%)	–
University of Massachusetts Lowell	February 12–20, 2020	450 (LV)	± 6.7%	13%	12%	12%	7%	24%	2%	16%	–	7% (Note: Gabbard with 4%; "Another candidate" with 3%)	6%
Monmouth University	February 16–19, 2020	408 (LV)	± 4.9%	17%	13%	9%	4%	24%	5%	10%	–	3% (Note: Gabbard with 2%; "Other" with 1%)	13%
Monmouth University	February 16–19, 2020	408 (LV)	± 4.9%	36% (Note: If only the two candidates for which percentages are listed could be voted for)	–	–	–	44%	–	–	–	15% (Note: "Already voted" with 10%; "neither" with 5%)	5%
Monmouth University	February 16–19, 2020	408 (LV)	± 4.9%	–	31% (Note: If only the two candidates for which percentages are listed could be voted for)	–	–	48%	–	–	–	14% (Note: "Already voted" with 10%; "neither" with 4%)	6%
Monmouth University	February 16–19, 2020	408 (LV)	± 4.9%	–	–	26% (Note: If only the two candidates for which percentages are listed could be voted for)	–	51%	–	–	–	16% (Note: "Already voted" with 10%; "neither" with 6%)	7%
Monmouth University	February 16–19, 2020	408 (LV)	± 4.9%	–	–	–	24% (Note: If only the two candidates for which percentages are listed could be voted for)	54%	–	–	–	16% (Note: "Already voted" with 10%; "neither" with 6%)	6%
Public Policy Institute of California	February 7–17, 2020	573 (LV)	± 5.7%	14%	12%	12%	5%	32%	3%	13%	–	2% (Note: Tulsi Gabbard 1%; someone else 1%)	8%
SurveyUSA	February 13–16, 2020	520 (LV)	± 4.8%	15%	21%	12%	6%	25%	3%	9%	–	1% (Note: "Some other Democrat" with 1%)	9%
YouGov/USC	February 1–15, 2020	–	–	21%	8%	6%	3%	29%	2%	20%	–	2% (Note: Gabbard with 2%)	9% (Note: "someone else/skipped")
	February 11, 2020	New Hampshire primary; Yang withdraws from the race after close of polls.											
Capitol Weekly	February 6–9, 2020	843 (LV)	–	8% (Note: Answers listed in this row are for the question, "If electability wasn't a concern, who would you support?")	8%	15%	7%	25%	4%	19%	5%	6% (Note: Gabbard with 3%; Booker with 2%; Williamson with 1%; Patrick with 0%)	3% (Note: Listed as "no response")
Capitol Weekly	February 6–9, 2020	843 (LV)	–	11%	13%	14%	5%	29%	3%	16%	4%	5% (Note: Gabbard with 3%; Booker, Patrick and Williamson with 1%; Delaney with 0%)	1% (Note: Listed as "no response")
	February 3, 2020	Iowa Caucuses											
Change Research/KQED News	January 25–27, 2020	1,967 (LV)	–	15%	4%	8%	3%	30%	2%	16%	5%	4% (Note: Gabbard with 4%; Bennet, Delaney and Patrick with <1%)	13%
Berkeley IGS/LA Times	January 15–21, 2020	2,895 (LV)	± 2.5%	15.0%	6.0%	7.2%	4.9%	26.3%	1.8%	19.6%	3.9%	3.6% (Note: Gabbard with 1.4%; Bennet with 0.9%; Booker with 0.8%; "All others" with 0.5%)	11.7%
SurveyUSA	January 14–16, 2020	565 (LV)	± 5.1%	30%	6%	8%	2%	20%	4%	20%	4%	2% (Note: Gabbard with 2%; others with 0%)	4%
	January 13, 2020	Booker withdraws from the race.											
Public Policy Institute of California/Mercury News	January 3–12, 2020	530 (LV)	± 6.5%	24%	1%	6%	4%	27%	–	23%	3%	5% (Note: someone else (included Bloomberg) 6%)	7%
Tulchin Research/USC Rossier/The Hill	January 3–10, 2020	1,121 (LV)	–	25%	7%	8%	2%	29%	3%	12%	5%	2% (Note: Booker and "someone else" with 1%)	6%
Capitol Weekly	January 1–9, 2020	1,053 (LV)	–	20%	6%	11%	5%	24%	2%	21%	7%	3% (Note: Gabbard with 2%; Booker with 1%; Delaney, Patrick and Williamson with 0%; no response with 0%)	–

Polling before 1 January 2020
Poll source	Date(s) administered	Sample size	Margin of error	Joe Biden	Cory Booker	Pete Buttigieg	Kamala Harris	Beto O'Rourke	Bernie Sanders	Elizabeth Warren	Andrew Yang	Other	Undecided
Change Research/KQED News	December 6–10, 2019	862 (LV)	± 3.3%	19%	3%	12%	–	–	26%	23%	4%	13% (Note: Bloomberg, Castro and Gabbard with 3%; Steyer with 2%; Klobuchar and Williamson with 1%; Bennet, Delaney and Patrick with 0%)	–
CNN/SSRS	December 4–8, 2019	508 (LV)	± 5.2%	21%	3%	9%	–	–	20%	17%	6%	12% (Note: Bloomberg with 5%; Gabbard and Klobuchar with 2%; Castro and Steyer with 1%; Bennet, Delaney, Patrick, and Williamson with 0%; "None/No one" with 1%)	11%
Capitol Weekly	December 3–7, 2019	581 (LV)	– (Note: The top row presents results which exclude Kamala Harris as an option.)	19%	2%	14%	–	–	19%	23%	5%	17% (Note: Bloomberg with 5%; Gabbard and Klobuchar with 4%; Castro with 2%; Steyer and Williamson with 1%; Delaney and Patrick with 0%)	1%
Capitol Weekly	December 3–7, 2019	581 (LV)	–	19%	2%	13%	4%	–	19%	21%	5%	17% (Note: Bloomberg with 5%; Gabbard and Klobuchar with 4%; Castro, Steyer and Williamson with 1%; Delaney with 0%; Patrick with no voters)	0%
	December 3, 2019	Harris withdraws from the race.											
Berkeley IGS/LA Times	November 21–27, 2019	1,252 (LV)	–	14%	1%	12%	7%	–	24%	22%	3%	12% (Note: Klobuchar with 3%; Bloomberg with 2%; Bennet, Castro, Gabbard, Steyer with 1%, Bullock, Delaney, Patrick, Sestak and Williamson with 0%)	9%
SurveyUSA	November 20–22, 2019	558 (LV)	± 4.8%	28%	3%	8%	10%	–	18%	13%	5%	11% (Note: Bloomberg and Steyer with 3%; Gabbard with 2%; Castro and Klobuchar with 1%; Patrick with 0%; others with 1%)	5%
Capitol Weekly	November 1–12, 2019	695 (LV)	–	18%	1%	14%	6%	–	21%	27%	4%	8% (Note: Gabbard and Klobuchar with 3%; Steyer and Williamson with 1%; Castro and Delaney with 0%)	1%
Public Policy Institute of California	November 3–12, 2019	682 (LV)	–	24%	1%	7%	8%	–	17%	23%	5%	6% (Note: Klobuchar and Steyer with 1%; other with 4%)	9%
	November 1, 2019	O'Rourke withdraws from the race.											
Change Research	October 15–18, 2019	1,631 (LV)	–	19%	1%	9%	8%	1%	24%	28%	3%	6% (Note: Gabbard and Klobuchar with 2%; Steyer and Williamson with 1%; Bennet, Bullock, Castro, Delaney, Messam, Ryan, and Sestak with 0%)	–
SurveyUSA	October 15–16, 2019	553 (LV)	± 6.9%	33%	2%	4%	8%	2%	17%	18%	4%	5% (Note: Castro, Gabbard, Klobuchar, Steyer, and some other Democrat with 1%)	8%
Capitol Weekly	October 1–14, 2019	590 (LV)	–	21%	2%	6%	8%	0%	15%	35%	3%	9% (Note: Castro and Gabbard with 2%; Klobuchar, Steyer and Williamson with 1%; de Blasio and Ryan with 0%; no response with 2%)	–
Public Policy Institute of California	September 16–25, 2019	692 (LV)	± 4.9%	22%	2%	6%	8%	1%	21%	23%	3%	7% (Note: Castro with 2%; Klobuchar and Steyer with 1%; someone else with 3%)	9%
Berkeley IGS/LA Times	September 13–18, 2019	2,272	–	20%	1%	6%	8%	3%	19%	29%	2%	5% (Note: Klobuchar with 2%; Bennet, Castro and Gabbard with 1%; Bullock, de Blasio, Delaney, Messam, Ryan, Sestak, Steyer and Williamson with 0%;)	8%
Emerson College	September 13–16, 2019	424	± 4.7%	26%	1%	4%	6%	5%	26%	20%	7%	4% (Note: Gabbard with 2%; Castro and Steyer with 1%; Bennet, de Blasio, Bullock, Delaney, Klobuchar, Messam, Ryan, Sestak and Williamson with 0%; someone else with 1%)	–
SurveyUSA	September 13–15, 2019	547	± 4.8%	27%	2%	3%	13%	2%	18%	16%	7%	4% (Note: Castro with 2%; Klobuchar with 1%; someone else with 1%)	7%
Change Research/KQED	September 12–15, 2019	3,325	± 1.7%	18%	2%	10%	11%	2%	23%	25%	3%	5% (Note: Gabbard with 2%; Castro, Klobuchar and Williamson with 1%; Bennet, de Blasio, Bullock, Delaney, Messam, Ryan, Sestak and Steyer with 0%)	–
Capitol Weekly	September 1–13, 2019	599	–	18%	1%	7%	11%	2%	21%	29%	4%	5% (Note: Gabbard with 2%; Castro, Klobuchar and Williamson with 1%; Steyer with 0%)	–
Capitol Weekly	September 1–13, 2019	5,510	–	18%	1%	8%	11%	2%	17%	33%	3%	7% (Note: Gabbard with 3%; Castro, Klobuchar, Steyer and Williamson with 1%; Bennet, Bullock, de Blasio, Delaney and Ryan with 0%)	–
SurveyUSA	August 1–5, 2019	528	± 6.3%	25%	1%	6%	17%	0%	18%	21%	1%	1% (Note: Gabbard with 1%)	10%
PPIC	July 14–23, 2019	766	± 4.4%	11%	–	5%	19%	–	12%	15%	–	14% (Note: "Anyone" with 2%; "None of them" with 5%; "Others" with 7%)	25%
YouGov/CBS News	July 9–18, 2019	1,514	± 2.9%	24%	1%	6%	23%	1%	16%	19%	1%	9% (Note: Bennet, Castro, Gabbard, Gravel, Klobuchar, Steyer, Williamson with 1%; Bullock, de Blasio, Delaney, Gillibrand, Hickenlooper, Inslee, Messam, Moulton, Ryan, and Sestak with 0%)	–
Quinnipiac University	July 10–15, 2019	519	± 5.7%	21%	1%	3%	23%	1%	18%	16%	2%	2% (Note: Castro and Inslee with 1%; Bennet, Bullock, de Blasio, Delaney, Gabbard, Gillibrand, Gravel, Hickenlooper, Klobuchar, Messam, Moulton, Ryan, Sestak, Steyer, and Williamson with <1%, others with <1%)	10%
Capitol Weekly	July 1–15, 2019	816	–	20%	1%	8%	20%	2%	16%	25%	1%	7% (Note: Castro, Gabbard, Gillibrand, Inslee, Klobuchar, & Williamson with 1%; Bennet, Bullock, de Blasio, Delaney, Hickenlooper, Ryan, Swalwell & Steyer with 0%)	–
Change Research	July 9–11, 2019	1,609	± 2.5%	17%	1%	8%	23%	2%	20%	22%	2%	5% (Note: Gabbard with 2%; Castro, Klobuchar & Inslee with 1%; Bennet, de Blasio, Delaney, Gillibrand, Gravel, Hickenlooper, Messam, Ryan, Sestak, Steyer & Williamson with 0%)	–
	July 8, 2019	Swalwell withdraws from the race.											
Capitol Weekly	June 1–30, 2019	813	–	23%	2%	8%	14%	2%	19%	23%	2%	9% (Note: Gabbard & Hickenlooper with 2%; Bennet, Gillibrand & Klobuchar with 1%; Bullock, Castro, de Blasio, Delaney, Inslee, Moulton, Ryan & Williamson with 0%)	–
UC Berkeley	June 4–10, 2019	2,131	± 3.0%	22%	1%	10%	13%	3%	17%	18%	1%	3% (Note: Castro and Klobuchar with 1%; Bullock, Delaney, Gillibrand, Hickenlooper, Inslee, Ryan, Swalwell, and Williamson with 0%)	11%
Capitol Weekly	May 1–31, 2019	1,180	–	29%	2%	9%	17%	4%	22%	11%	0%	6% (Note: Castro, Gillibrand, Hickenlooper, Klobuchar, Ryan & Swalwell with 1%; Bullock, de Blasio, Gabbard, Inslee & Williamson with 0%)	–
Change Research	May 25–28, 2019	1,649	± 2.4%	30%	1%	12%	15%	3%	23%	12%	1%	2% (Note: Castro and Gabbard with 1%; Abrams, Bennet, Gillibrand, Gravel, Hickenlooper, Klobuchar, Inslee, Moulton, Ryan, Swalwell, and Williamson with 0%)	–
Capitol Weekly	April 15–30, 2019	1,204	–	20%	2%	19%	17%	4%	20%	10%	–	9% (Note: Klobuchar with 3%; Inslee with 2%; Gillibrand, Hickenlooper, Ryan & Swalwell with 1%; Castro with 0%)	–
	April 25, 2019	Biden announces his candidacy.											
	April 14, 2019	Buttigieg announces his candidacy.											
Change Research	April 6–9, 2019	2,003	± 2.2%	21%	3%	9%	19%	10%	22%	8%	1%	7% (Note: Castro with 2%; Abrams, Gabbard, Inslee, Klobuchar, and Swalwell with 1%; Bennet, Delaney, Gillibrand, Hickenlooper, Messam, Ryan, and Williamson with 0%)	–
Change Research	April 6–9, 2019	2,003	± 2.2%	–	5%	11%	27%	16%	28%	9%	1%	5% (Note: Castro with 2%; Gabbard, Klobuchar, and Ryan with 1%; Delaney, Gillibrand, Hickenlooper, Inslee, Messam, and Williamson with 0%)	–
	April 8, 2019	Swalwell announces his candidacy.											
Quinnipiac University	April 3–8, 2019	482	± 5.9%	26%	2%	7%	17%	4%	18%	7%	1%	6% (Note: Castro and Klobuchar with 2%; Gabbard and Inslee with 1%; Delaney, Gillibrand, Hickenlooper, Messam, and Williamson with <1%; others with <1%)	13%
	March 14, 2019	O'Rourke announces his candidacy.											
	February 19, 2019	Sanders announces his candidacy.											
Change Research	February 9–11, 2019	948	–	26%	3%	1%	26%	8%	20%	7%	0%	7% (Note: Castro with 2%; Brown, Gabbard, Gillibrand, Holder, and Klobuchar with 1%; Bloomberg, Bullock, Cuomo, Delaney, Hickenlooper, Inslee, Swalwell, and Williamson with 0%)	–
Change Research	February 9–11, 2019	948	–	–	7%	2%	53%	–	–	23%	1%	15% (Note: Castro with 6%; Gabbard with 4%; Delaney and Gillibrand with 2%; Williamson with 1%)	–

== Colorado primary ==
The Colorado Democratic primary was held on March 3, 2020.

Polling Aggregation
Source of poll aggregation	Date updated	Dates polled	Bernie Sanders	Joe Biden	Elizabeth Warren	Michael Bloomberg	Tulsi Gabbard	Un- decided
270 to Win	March 3, 2020	Feb 24–Mar 2, 2020	29.3%	16.3%	16.0%	15.3%	1.0%	22.1%
RealClear Politics	March 3, 2020	Insufficient recent polling to supply an average.						
FiveThirtyEight	March 3, 2020	until March 3, 2020	26.8%	18.2%	16.3%	15.8%	0.5%	22.4%
Average			28.0%	17.3%	16.2%	15.6%	0.8%	22.1%
Colorado primary results (March 3, 2020)			37.0%	24.6%	17.6%	18.5%	1.0%	1.3%

Tabulation of individual polls of the 2020 Colorado Democratic Primary
Poll source	Date(s) administered	Sample size	Margin of error	Michael Bennet	Joe Biden	Michael Bloomberg	Pete Buttigieg	Kamala Harris	John Hickenlooper	Bernie Sanders	Elizabeth Warren	Andrew Yang	Other	Undecided
	Mar 2, 2020	Klobuchar withdraws from the race												
Swayable	Mar 1–2, 2020	921 (LV)	± 4.0%	–	20%	19%	12%	–	–	29%	12%	–	7% (Note: Klobuchar with 4%; Gabbard and Steyer with 0%; "Other" with 3%)	–
Data for Progress	Feb 28–Mar 2, 2020	464 (LV)	± 4.2%	–	18%	16%	8%	–	–	32%	21%	–	5% (Note: Klobuchar with 3%; Gabbard with 2%)	–
	Mar 1, 2020	Buttigieg withdraws from the race												
Elucd	Feb 26–Mar 1, 2020	561 (LV)	± 4.1%	–	10%	9%	10%	–	–	34%	14%	–	9% (Note: Klobuchar with 5%; "Others" with 4%)	14%
Magellan Strategies	Feb 24–25, 2020	500 (LV)	± 4.38%	–	11%	11%	12%	–	–	27%	15%	–	9% (Note: Klobuchar with 6%; Gabbard and Steyer with 1%; "Other" with 1%)	15%
Data for Progress	Feb 23–25, 2020	471 (LV)	± 4.7%	–	10%	14%	14%	–	–	34%	20%	–	7% (Note: Klobuchar with 6%; Gabbard with 1%)	1%
	Feb 11, 2020	New Hampshire primary; Yang and Bennet withdraw from the race												
	Dec 3, 2019	Harris withdraws from the race												
Emerson College	Aug 16–19, 2019	403 (LV)	± 4.8%	1%	25%	–	5%	13%	–	26%	20%	4%	8% (Note: Booker with 2%; de Blasio, Gabbard, O'Rourke, Ryan, Williamson, and "Someone else" with 1%; Bullock, Castro, Delaney, Gillibrand, Inslee, Klobuchar, Messam, Moulton, Sestak and Steyer with 0%)	–
	Aug 15, 2019	Hickenlooper withdraws from the race												
Public Policy Polling	Jul 12–14, 2019	519 (LV)	–	5%	22%	–	7%	9%	7%	15%	19%	0%	14% (Note: O’Rourke with 1%; Booker, Castro, Inslee, de Blasio, Gabbard, Klobuchar, Ryan, Steyer, Williamson, Bullock, Delaney, Gillibrand, Gravel, Messam, Moulton, and Sestak with 0%)	–

== Maine primary ==
The Maine Democratic primary was held on March 3, 2020.

Polling Aggregation
Source of poll aggregation	Date updated	Dates polled	Bernie Sanders	Joe Biden	Michael Bloomberg	Elizabeth Warren	Tulsi Gabbard	Undecided
270 to Win	Mar 3, 2020	Feb 10–Mar 2, 2020	28.7%	19.7%	20.0%	13.3%	1.3%	17.0%
RealClear Politics	Mar 3, 2020	Feb 28–Mar 2, 2020	38.5%	24.5%	14.0%	18.0%	– (Note: Gabbard not averaged)	5.0%
FiveThirtyEight	Mar 3, 2020	until Mar 2, 2020	31.1%	21.7%	17.2%	14.2%	0.7%	19.6%
Average			32.8%	22.0%	17.1%	15.2%	1.0%	11.9%
Maine primary results (March 3, 2020)			32.4%	33.4%	11.8%	15.6%	0.9%	5.9%

Tabulation of individual polls of the 2020 Maine Democratic Primary
Poll source	Date(s) administered	Sample size	Margin of error	Joe Biden	Michael Bloomberg	Pete Buttigieg	Kamala Harris	Bernie Sanders	Elizabeth Warren	Andrew Yang	Other	Undecided
	Mar 2, 2020	Klobuchar withdraws from the race										
Swayable	Mar 1–2, 2020	209 (LV)	± 9.0%	22%	28%	10%	–	27%	11%	–	3% (Note: Klobuchar with 2%; Steyer with 0%; Gabbard with no voters; "Other" with 1%)	–
Change Research	Mar 1–2, 2020	507 (LV)	–	24%	10%	–	–	43%	16%	–	7% (Note: Not yet released)	–
Data for Progress	Feb 28–Mar 2, 2020	385 (LV)	± 4.9%	25%	18%	1%	–	34%	20%	–	2% (Note: Klobuchar and Gabbard with 1%)	–
	Mar 1, 2020	Buttigieg withdraws from the race										
SocialSphere/Colby College	Feb 10–13, 2020	350 (LV)	–	12%	14%	16%	–	25%	9%	2%	10% (Note: Klobuchar with 4%; Gabbard with 3%; Steyer with 2%; Bennet with 1%; Patrick and "Someone else" with no voters)	12%
	Feb 11, 2020	Yang withdraws from the race										
	Dec 3, 2019	Harris withdraws from the race										
Maine People's Resource Center	Oct 14–21, 2019	728 (LV)	± 3.63%	26.8%	–	9.1%	5.0%	15.4%	22.1%	1.7%	11.4% (Note: "Other" with 6.5%; Booker with 2.7% and O'Rourke with 2.2%)	4.4%
Public Policy Polling	Oct 11–13, 2019	366 (LV)	± 5.1%	19%	–	9%	4%	12%	31%	3%	20% (Note: Booker with 2%; Castro and O'Rourke with 1%; "someone else/undecided" with 16%)	– (Note: The poll did not announce this result separately; it is listed as part of 'Other'.)
Gravis Marketing	Jun 24, 2019	243	± 6.3%	25%	–	8%	2%	15%	17%	5%	15% (Note: Ryan with 4%; Booker and Williamson with 3%; Bennet with 2%; Gillibrand, O'Rourke, and Swalwell with 1%; Bullock, Castro, de Blasio, Gabbard, Hickenlooper Inslee, and Klobuchar with 0%)	11%

== Massachusetts primary ==
The Massachusetts Democratic primary was held on March 3, 2020.

Polling Aggregation
Source of poll aggregation	Date updated	Dates polled	Bernie Sanders	Elizabeth Warren	Joe Biden	Michael Bloomberg	Tulsi Gabbard	Others/ Undecided (Note: Calculated by subtracting polled candidates from 100%)
270 to Win	March 3, 2020	Until March 3, 2020	22.4%	21.0%	15.0%	13.6%	1.8%	26.2%
FiveThirtyEight	March 3, 2020	until March 3, 2020	24.4%	21.0%	18.1%	14.5%	0.4%	21.6%
Average			23.4%	21.0%	16.6%	14.0%	1.1%	23.9%
Massachusetts primary results (March 3, 2020)			26.6%	21.4%	33.4%	11.7%	0.7%	6.1%

Tabulation of individual polls of the 2020 Massachusetts Democratic Primary
Poll source	Date(s) administered	Sample size	Margin of error	Joe Biden	Michael Bloomberg	Cory Booker	Pete Buttigieg	Kamala Harris	Amy Klobuchar	Beto O'Rourke	Deval Patrick	Bernie Sanders	Elizabeth Warren	Other	Undecided
	Mar 2, 2020	Klobuchar withdraws from the race; endorses Biden													
Swayable	Mar 1–2, 2020	917 (LV)	± 4.0%	17%	18%	–	11%	–	5%	–	–	27%	15%	8% (Note: Steyer with 4%; Gabbard with 1%; "Other" with 3%)	–
Data for Progress	Feb 28–Mar 2, 2020	301 (LV)	± 5.6%	26%	15%	–	2%	–	1%	–	–	26%	28%	2% (Note: Gabbard with 2%)	–
	Mar 1, 2020	Buttigieg withdraws from the race; endorses Biden													
Suffolk University/Boston Globe/WBZ-TV	Feb 26–29, 2020	500 (LV)	-	11.0%	13.0%	–	12.4%	–	5.0%	–	–	24.2%	22.2%	3.6% (Note: Steyer with 2.4%; Gabbard with 0.8%; refused with 0.4%)	8.6%
WBUR/MassINC	Feb 23–26, 2020	426 (LV)	± 4.9%	9%	13%	-	14%	-	6%	-	-	25%	17%	9% (Note: Gabbard with 1%; Steyer with 2%; Would not vote with 2%)	8%
UMass Amherst	Feb 18–24, 2020	400 (LV)	± 5.9%	12%	9%	-	14%	-	7%	-	-	25%	23%	8% (Note: Gabbard with 4%; Steyer with 3%)	3%
Falchuk & DiNatale	Feb 16–18, 2020	453 (LV)	–	13%	13%	–	13%	–	14%	–	–	17%	16%	5% (Note: Gabbard with 3%; Steyer with 2%)	8%
University of Massachusetts Lowell	Feb 12–19, 2020	450 (LV)	± 6.1%	14%	12%	–	15%	–	9%	–	–	21%	20%	6% (Note: Gabbard with 3%; Steyer with 2%; "Another candidate" with 1%)	4%
	Feb 12, 2020	Patrick withdraws from the race													
Falchuk & DiNatale	Jan 27–30, 2020	334 (LV)	–	16%	8%	–	6%	–	7%	–	3%	12%	23%	7% (Note: Steyer with 4%; Yang with 3%; Booker with 0%)	–
	Jan 13, 2020	Booker withdraws from the race													
	Dec 3, 2019	Harris withdraws from the race													
	Nov 24, 2019	Bloomberg announces his candidacy													
	Nov 14, 2019	Patrick announces his candidacy													
	Nov 1, 2019	O'Rourke withdraws from the race													
WBUR	Oct 16–20, 2019	456	± 4.6%	18%	–	0%	7%	3%	1%	0%	–	13%	33%	7% (Note: Gabbard with 2%; Delaney, Steyer and Yang with 1%; Bennet, Bullock, Castro, Messam, Ryan, Sestak, and Williamson with 0%; others with 2%; would not vote with 2%)	15%
Suffolk University	Sep 3–5, 2019	500	-	26%	–	1%	5%	3%	0%	1%	–	8%	24%	6% (Note: Gabbard with 2%; Bennet, Bullock and Yang with 1%; de Blasio, Castro, Delaney, Messam, Ryan, Sestak, Steyer and Williamson with 0%; refused with 1%)	25%
	Aug 23, 2019	Moulton withdraws from the race													
Suffolk University	Jun 5–9, 2019	370	± 5.1%	22%	–	1%	8%	5%	0%	1%	–	6%	10%	5% (Note: Gabbard, Moulton, and Yang with 1%; Bennet, Bullock, Castro, de Blasio, Delaney, Gillibrand, Gravel, Hickenlooper, Inslee, Klobuchar, Messam, Ryan, Swalwell, and Williamson with 0%; others with 1%)	42%
	Apr 25, 2019	Biden announces his candidacy													
	Apr 22, 2019	Moulton announces his candidacy													
	Apr 14, 2019	Buttigieg announces his candidacy													
Emerson College	Apr 4–7, 2019	371	± 5.0%	23%	–	2%	11%	7%	2%	8%	–	26%	14%	8% (Note: Castro, Delaney, Gabbard, and Yang with 1%; Gillibrand and Inslee with 0%; others with 5%)	–
	Mar 14, 2019	O'Rourke announces his candidacy													
	Feb 19, 2019	Sanders announces his candidacy													
	Feb 10, 2019	Klobuchar announces her candidacy													
	Feb 9, 2019	Warren announces her candidacy													
	Feb 1, 2019	Booker announces his candidacy													
	Jan 21, 2019	Harris announces her candidacy													
YouGov/UMass Amherst	Nov 7–14, 2018	655	–	19%	–	3%	–	6%	3%	10%	6%	14%	11%	1% (Note: Moulton with 1%)	27%

Hypothetical polling with only Biden, Sanders and Warren
Poll source	Date(s) administered	Sample size	Margin of error	Joe Biden	Bernie Sanders	Elizabeth Warren	Undecided
Evan Falchuk and Lou DiNatalie/Commonwealth Magazine	Oct 23–25, 2019	443 (LV)	–	35%	13%	41%	11%

== Minnesota primary ==
The Minnesota Democratic primary was held on March 3, 2020. Amy Klobuchar led in pre-election polling, but withdrew from the race the night before the election and endorsed Joe Biden (who went on to win Minnesota).

Polling Aggregation
Source of poll aggregation	Date updated	Dates polled	Amy Klobuchar	Bernie Sanders	Elizabeth Warren	Joe Biden	Michael Bloomberg	Tulsi Gabbard	Un- decided
270 to Win	Mar 2, 2020	Feb 20–22, 2020	28.0%	22.0%	13.5%	8.5%	6.0%	2.5%	19.5%
FiveThirtyEight	Mar 2, 2020	until Mar 2, 2020	24.4%	26.2%	14.4%	10.7%	5.6%	1.5%	17.2%
Average			26.2%	24.1%	14.0%	9.6%	5.8%	2.0%	18.3%
Minnesota Primary results (March 3, 2020)			5.6%	29.9%	15.4%	38.6%	8.3%	0.3%	1.8%

Tabulation of individual polls of the 2020 Minnesota Democratic Primary
Poll source	Date(s) administered	Sample size	Margin of error	Joe Biden	Michael Bloomberg	Pete Buttigieg	Kamala Harris	Amy Klobuchar	Beto O'Rourke	Bernie Sanders	Elizabeth Warren	Other	Undecided
	Mar 2, 2020	Klobuchar withdraws from the race											
Swayable	Mar 1–2, 2020	1,472 (LV)	± 4.0%	20%	14%	4%	–	21%	–	27%	8%	6% (Note: Steyer with 1%; Gabbard with 0%; "Other" with 5%)	–
Data for Progress	Feb 28–Mar 2, 2020	650 (LV)	± 3.84%	27%	16%	–	–	2%	–	32%	21%	1% (Note: Gabbard with 1%)	–
	Mar 1, 2020	Buttigieg withdraws from the race											
Mason-Dixon/Star Tribune/ MPR News Minnesota	Feb 17–20, 2020	500(LV)	± 4.5%	8%	3%	3%	–	29%	–	23%	11%	2% (Note: Gabbard and Steyer with 1%)	21%
University of Massachusetts Lowell	Feb 12–19, 2020	450(LV)	± 6.4%	9%	9%	10%	–	27%	–	21%	16%	4% (Note: Gabbard with 4%; Steyer and "Another Candidate" with 0%)	4%
	Dec 3, 2019	Harris withdraws from the race											
	Nov 1, 2019	O'Rourke withdraws from the race											
St. Cloud State University	Oct 14-Nov 1, 2019	177 (LV)	–	15%	–	2%	–	15%	–	12%	15%	–	–
Kaiser Family Foundation	Sep 23–Oct 15, 2019	249	–	14%	–	7%	1%	15%	1%	13%	25%	5% (Note: Yang with 4%; Booker with 1%; Steyer, Castro, and Refused to answer with 0%; Someone else not reported)	21%
Change Research	Jun 8–12, 2019	772	± 3.7%	20%	–	11%	4%	16%	3%	19%	21%	5% (Note: Yang with 2%; Booker, Castro, and Inslee with 1%; Bennet, Delaney, Gabbard, Gillibrand, Gravel, Messam, Moulton, Ryan, and Williamson with 0%)	–

== North Carolina primary ==
The North Carolina Democratic primary was held on March 3, 2020.

Polling Aggregation
Source of poll aggregation	Date Updated	Dates polled	Joe Biden	Bernie Sanders	Michael Bloomberg	Elizabeth Warren	Tulsi Gabbard	Other/ Undecided
270 to Win	March 3, 2020	February 21–March 2, 2020	27.8%	25.8%	17.0%	11.6%	0.8%	17.0%
RealClear Politics	March 3, 2020	February 27–March 2, 2020	36.7%	23.3%	14.3%	10.7%	1.0%	14.0%
FiveThirtyEight	March 3, 2020	until March 2, 2020	34.5%	22.1%	14.4%	11.3%	0.2%	17.5%
Average			33.0%	23.7%	15.2%	11.2%	0.7%	16.2%
North Carolina primary results (March 3, 2020)			43.0%	24.1%	13.0%	10.5%	0.5%	8.9%

Tabulation of individual polls of the 2020 North Carolina Democratic primary
Poll source	Date(s) administered	Sample size	Margin of error	Joe Biden	Michael Bloomberg	Cory Booker	Pete Buttigieg	Kamala Harris	Bernie Sanders	Elizabeth Warren	Andrew Yang	Other	Undecided
	Mar 2, 2020	Klobuchar withdraws from the race											
Spry Strategies/Civitas	Mar 1–2, 2020	543 (LV)	± 4.2%	45%	11%	–	3%	–	18%	7%	–	6% (Note: Klobuchar with 3%; "Another Candidate" with 3%)	11%
Swayable	Mar 1–2, 2020	1,209 (LV)	± 3.0%	36%	18%	–	4%	–	23%	10%	–	10% (Note: Klobuchar with 4%; Steyer with 1%; Gabbard with 0%; "Other" with 5%)	–
Data for Progress	Feb 28–Mar 2, 2020	334 (LV)	± 5.3%	36%	18%	–	3%	–	27%	14%	–	3% (Note: Klobuchar with 2%; Gabbard with 1%)	–
	Mar 1, 2020	Buttigieg withdraws from the race											
Elucd	Feb 26–Mar 1, 2020	657 (LV)	± 3.8%	25%	15%	–	6%	–	26%	12%	–	6% (Note: Klobuchar with 6%)	10%
East Carolina University	Feb 27–28, 2020	499 (LV)	± 5.1%	29%	14%	–	4%	–	25%	11%	–	9% (Note: Klobuchar with 5%; Steyer with 3%; Gabbard with 1%)	9%
High Point University	Feb 21–28, 2020	274 (LV)	–	14%	20%	–	8%	–	28%	12%	–	13% (Note: Klobuchar and Steyer with 4%; Booker and Patrick with 2%; Gabbard with 1%; Bennet, Castro, Delaney, Williamson, and Yang with 0%)	7%
High Point University	Feb 21–28, 2020	472 (RV)	–	14%	18%	–	8%	–	31%	11%	–	11% (Note: Steyer with 4%; Klobuchar with 3%; Booker with 2%; Gabbard and Patrick with 1%; Bennet, Castro, Delaney, Williamson, and Yang with 0%)	7%
Spry Strategies/Civitas	Feb 26–27, 2020	581 (LV)	± 4.1%	27%	16%	–	4%	–	19%	11%	–	10% (Note: Klobuchar with 5%; "Another Candidate" with 5%)	15%
Marist College	Feb 23–27, 2020	568 (LV)	± 5.1%	24%	15%	–	7%	–	26%	11%	–	8% (Note: Klobuchar with 5%; Steyer with 2%; Gabbard with 1%; "Other" with <1%)	7%
Marist College	Feb 23–27, 2020	974 (RV)	± 3.9%	22%	15%	–	7%	–	27%	11%	–	9% (Note: Klobuchar with 5%; Steyer with 2%; Gabbard with 1%; "Other" with 1%)	8%
Data for Progress	Feb 23–27, 2020	536 (LV)	± 4.2%	25%	18%	–	10%	–	27%	11%	–	8% (Note: Klobuchar with 6%; Gabbard and Steyer with 1%)	–
Public Policy Polling	Feb 23–24, 2020	852 (LV)	± 3.4%	23%	17%	–	9%	–	20%	11%	–	8% (Note: Klobuchar with 4%; Steyer with 3%; Gabbard with 1%)	11% (Note: Support listed for "someone else/undecided")
Meredith College	Feb 16–24, 2020	430 (LV)	–	17.9%	17.0%	0.7%	10.0%	–	19.5%	10.9%	–	7.6% (Note: Klobuchar with 4.0%; Gabbard with 0.9%; Yang with 0.7%; Steyer, Bennet, Patrick, and Williamson with 0.5%; Castro and Delaney with 0.0%)	16.5% (Note: "No preference" with 3.7%; "Don't know" with 11.2%; "No answer/Refused" with 1.6%)
Spry Strategies/Civitas	Feb 21–23, 2020	561 (LV)	± 3.75%	20%	20%	–	3%	–	20%	9%	–	13% (Note: Klobuchar with 6%; "Another Candidate" with 7%)	14%
University of Massachusetts Lowell	Feb 12–18, 2020	450 (LV)	± 6.5%	16%	19%	–	10%	–	23%	13%	–	13% (Note: Klobuchar with 7%; Gabbard and Steyer with 3%)	6%
SurveyUSA/WRAL News	Feb 13–16, 2020	698 (LV)	± 5.0%	20%	22%	–	11%	–	22%	8%	–	7% (Note: Klobuchar with 5%; others with 2%)	11%
	Feb 11, 2020	New Hampshire primary; Yang withdraws from the race after close of polls											
High Point University	Jan 31–Feb 6, 2020	225 (LV)	–	24%	16%	0%	8%	–	20%	11%	3%	9% (Note: Steyer with 4%; Klobuchar with 3%; Gabbard with 2%; Castro, Delaney and Patrick with 0%)	8%
High Point University	Jan 31–Feb 6, 2020	399 (RV)	–	19%	13%	1%	6%	–	25%	12%	4%	8% (Note: Steyer and Klobuchar with 3%; Gabbard and Patrick with 1%; Castro and Delaney with 0%)	12%
Public Policy Polling	Feb 4–5, 2020	604 (LV)	–	25%	14%	–	9%	–	16%	12%	5%	7% (Note: Klobuchar with 5% and Steyer with 2%)	13% (Note: Support listed for "someone else/undecided")
	Jan 13, 2020	Booker withdraws from the race											
Public Policy Polling	Jan 10–12, 2020	509 (LV)	–	31%	8%	1%	6%	–	18%	15%	5%	6% (Note: Klobuchar and Steyer with 3%)	11% (Note: Support listed for "someone else/undecided")
	Dec 3, 2019	Harris withdraws from the race											
	Nov 24, 2019	Bloomberg launches his campaign											
Fox News	Nov 10–13, 2019	669	± 3.5%	37%	–	2%	6%	4%	14%	15%	2%	8% (Note: Gabbard and Steyer with 2%; Bennet, Bullock and Klobuchar with 1%; Castro, Delaney, Messam, Sestak and Williamson with 0%; others with 1%; none with 3%)	10%
HighPoint University	Nov 1–7, 2019	347 (Note: Democrats only)	± 6.4%	33%	–	2%	4%	5%	18%	13%	2%	6% (Note: Klobuchar with 3%; Steyer with 2%; Gabbard with 1%; refused with 6%)	10%
HighPoint University	Nov 1–7, 2019	1,049 (Note: All adults)	± 3.6%	18%	–	2%	4%	4%	15%	7%	2%	7% (Note: Gabbard with 4%; Klobuchar with 2%; Steyer with 1%; refused with 21%)	23%
Siena Research/New York Times	Oct 13–26, 2019	324	–	29%	–	1%	1%	1%	13%	15%	0%	3% (Note: O'Rourke with 2%; Gabbard with 1%; others with 0%)	32%
High Point University	Sep 13–19, 2019	348 (A)	–	31%	–	4%	3%	6%	20%	15%	4%	3% (Note: Castro, Klobuchar, and O'Rourke with 1%)	9%
SurveyUSA/Civitas	Aug 1–5, 2019	534	± 6.1%	36%	–	1%	5%	8%	15%	13%	1%	2% (Note: Castro, and Gabbard with 1%; O'Rourke with 0%)	17%
Emerson College	May 31 – Jun 3, 2019	397	± 4.9%	39%	–	1%	8%	5%	22%	15%	1%	7% (Note: O'Rourke with 3%; de Blasio, Gillibrand, Klobuchar, and Ryan with 1%; Bennet, Bullock, Castro, Delaney, Gabbard, Gravel, Hickenlooper, Inslee, Messam, Moulton, Swalwell, and Williamson with 0%; others with 2%)	–

== Oklahoma primary ==
The Oklahoma Democratic primary was held on March 3, 2020.

Polling aggregation
Source of poll aggregation	Date updated	Dates polled	Joe Biden	Bernie Sanders	Michael Bloomberg	Elizabeth Warren	Tulsi Gabbard	Other/ Undecided
270 to Win	March 3, 2020	February 17–March 2, 2020	28.0%	23.7%	16.0%	12.3%	1.5%	18.5%
RealClear Politics	March 3, 2020	Insufficient recent polling to supply an average.						
FiveThirtyEight	March 3, 2020	until March 2, 2020	30.6%	22.1%	13.7%	13.6%	1.1%	18.9%
Average			29.3%	22.9%	14.85%	12.95%	1.3%	18.7%
Oklahoma primary results (March 3, 2020)			38.7%	25.4%	13.9%	13.4%	1.7%	6.9%

Tabulation of individual polls of the 2020 Oklahoma Democratic primary
Poll source	Date(s) administered	Sample size	Margin of error	Joe Biden	Michael Bloomberg	Pete Buttigieg	Kamala Harris	Amy Klobuchar	Bernie Sanders	Elizabeth Warren	Other	Undecided
	Mar 1–2, 2020	Buttigieg and Klobuchar withdraw from the race										
Swayable	Mar 1–2, 2020	472 (LV)	± 6.0%	38%	11%	1%	–	1%	26%	13%	9% (Note: Steyer and Gabbard with 1%; "Other" with 7%)	–
Data for Progress	Feb 28–Mar 2, 2020	300 (LV)	± 5.5%	35%	19%	–	–	–	28%	16%	2% (Note: Gabbard with 2%)	–
SoonerPoll	Feb 17–21, 2020	409	4.84%	21%	20%	10%	–	7%	13%	9%	2% (Note: Gabbard with <1%, Patrick with <1% and Steyer with 1%)	19%
Cole Hargrave Snodgrass & Associated	Feb 10–13, 2020	172 (LV)	–	12%	20%	1%	–	6%	14%	8%	21% (Note: "Likely not voting" with 14%; "other candidates" with 7%)	9%
	Dec 3, 2019	Harris withdraws from the race										
SoonerPoll	Jul 17–27, 2019	152	–	26%	–	6%	8%	1%	5%	12%	11% (Note: Booker and Bennet with 2%; Inslee, O'Rourke, Gillibrand, Bullock, Delaney, Hickenlooper, and Williamson with 1%)	34%

== Tennessee primary ==
The Tennessee Democratic primary was held on March 3, 2020.

Polling Aggregation
Source of poll aggregation	Date updated	Dates polled	Joe Biden	Bernie Sanders	Michael Bloomberg	Elizabeth Warren	Tulsi Gabbard	Other/ Undecided
270 to Win	March 3, 2020	February 28–March 2, 2020	31.0%	27.0%	18.5%	12.0%	0.5%	11.0%
RealClear Politics	March 3, 2020	Insufficient recent polling to supply an average.						
FiveThirtyEight	March 3, 2020	until March 2, 2020	29.0%	24.7%	15.7%	12.3%	0.2%	18.1%
Average			30.0%	25.85%	17.1%	12.15%	0.35%	14.55%
Tennessee primary results (March 3, 2020)			41.7%	25.0%	15.5%	10.4%	0.4%	7.0%

Tabulation of individual polls of the 2020 Tennessee Democratic Primary
Poll source	Date(s) administered	Sample size	Margin of error	Joe Biden	Michael Bloomberg	Pete Buttigieg	Kamala Harris	Bernie Sanders	Elizabeth Warren	Other	Undecided
	Mar 1–2, 2020	Buttigieg and Klobuchar withdraw from the race									
Swayable	Mar 1–2, 2020	1,527 (LV)	± 4.0%	28%	17%	8%	–	27%	9%	11% (Note: Klobuchar with 6%; Steyer with 1%; Gabbard with no voters; "Other" with 4%)	–
Data for Progress	Feb 28–Mar 2, 2020	368 (LV)	± 5.1%	34%	20%	2%	–	27%	15%	3% (Note: Klobuchar with 2%; Gabbard with 1%)	–
	Dec 3, 2019	Harris withdraws from the race									
SurveyMonkey	Jul 2–16, 2019	128	± 11.2%	33%	–	6%	12%	13%	18%	11% (Note: Bennet with 2%; Booker, Castro, Gabbard, Gillibrand, Hickenlooper, Klobuchar, Messam, Moulton, and O'Rourke with 1%; de Blasio, Bullock, Delaney, Gravel, Inslee, Ryan, Sestak, Williamson, and Yang with 0%)	–

== Texas primary ==
The Texas Democratic primary was held on March 3, 2020.

Polling Aggregation
Source of poll aggregation	Date updated	Dates polled	Bernie Sanders	Joe Biden	Michael Bloomberg	Elizabeth Warren	Tulsi Gabbard	Other/ Undecided
270 to Win	Mar 2, 2020	Feb 17-Mar 1, 2020	30.2%	25.6%	16.8%	13.6%	1.0%	12.8%
RealClear Politics	Mar 2, 2020	Feb 27-Mar 1, 2020	29.5%	28.0%	18.0%	14.5%	2.0%	8.0%
FiveThirtyEight	March 3, 2020	until March 2, 2020	28.2%	25.5%	16.5%	13.3%	0.4%	16.1%
Average			29.0%	26.5%	17.1%	13.8%	0.9%	12.6%
Texas primary results (March 3, 2020)			30.0%	34.5%	14.4%	11.4%	0.4%	9.3%

Polling from January 1, 2020, to March 3, 2020
Poll source	Date(s) administered	Sample size	Margin of error	Joe Biden	Michael Bloomberg	Pete Buttigieg	Amy Klobuchar	Bernie Sanders	Elizabeth Warren	Andrew Yang	Other	Undecided
	Mar 2, 2020	Klobuchar withdraws from the race										
Swayable	Mar 1–2, 2020	1,378 (LV)	± 3.0%	27%	20%	5%	3%	28%	12%	–	6% (Note: Steyer with 3%; Gabbard with no voters; "Other" with 3%)	–
Data for Progress	Feb 28–Mar 2, 2020	300 (LV)	± 5.7%	30%	20%	4%	3%	28%	15%	–	1% (Note: Gabbard with 1%)	–
AtlasIntel	Feb 24-Mar 2, 2020	486 (LV)	± 4.0%	25%	16%	5%	3%	35%	9%	–	3% (Note: Gabbard with 1%; "Other" with 2%)	4%
	Mar 1, 2020	Buttigieg withdraws from the race										
Emerson College/Nexstar	Feb 29-Mar 1, 2020	450 (LV)	± 4.6%	26%	16%	5%	4%	31%	14%	–	5% (Note: Gabbard with 3%; Steyer with 2%)	–
Elucd	Feb 26-Mar 1, 2020	833 (LV)	± 3.4%	20%	14%	7%	5%	31%	13%	–	–	11%
YouGov/CBS News	Feb 27–29, 2020	635 (LV)	± 6.2%	26%	13%	6%	6%	30%	17%	–	2% (Note: Steyer with 1%; Gabbard with 0%; "Someone else" with 1%)	–
Marist College	Feb 23–27, 2020	556 (LV)	± 5.3%	19%	15%	8%	3%	34%	10%	–	2% (Note: Steyer and Gabbard with 1%; "Other" with <1%)	9%
Marist College	Feb 23–27, 2020	1,050 (RV)	± 3.7%	18%	16%	8%	3%	35%	8%	–	3% (Note: Steyer with 2%; Gabbard with 1%; "Other" with <1%)	9%
Data for Progress	Feb 23–27, 2020	513 (LV)	± 4.3%	21%	21%	9%	5%	30%	13%	–	2% (Note: Gabbard and Steyer with 1%)	–
CNN/SSRS	Feb 22–26, 2020	387 (LV)	± 6.0%	20%	18%	8%	3%	29%	15%	–	0%	5% (Note: None/No one 1%; No opinion 4%)
Latino Decisions/Univision/ University of Houston	Feb 21–26, 2020	527 (LV)	± 4.3%	20%	20%	6%	2%	26%	11%	–	7% (Note: Steyer with 2%; Gabbard and Patrick with 1%; Bennet with 0%; "Other" with 3%)	6%
University of Texas at Tyler	Feb 17–26, 2020	586 (LV)	± 4.1%	19%	21%	8%	4%	29%	10%	–	2% (Note: Gabbard and Steyer with 1%)	5%
Public Policy Polling/Progress Texas	Feb 24–25, 2020	1,045 (LV)	± 3.0%	31%	– (Note: Respondents were asked who they would vote for if Bloomberg were not a candidate.)	11%	7%	25%	17%	–	4% (Note: Steyer with 3%; Gabbard with 1%)	5% (Note: Reported as "Someone else/Undecided")
Public Policy Polling/Progress Texas	Feb 24–25, 2020	1,045 (LV)	± 3.0%	24%	17%	10%	4%	24%	14%	–	2% (Note: Gabbard and Steyer with 1%)	5% (Note: Reported as "Someone else/Undecided")
	Feb 22, 2020	Nevada caucuses										
University of Massachusetts Lowell	Feb 12–18, 2020	600 (LV)	± 5.9%	20%	18%	7%	9%	23%	14%	–	6% (Note: Gabbard with 4%; Steyer with 2%; "Another candidate" with 0%)	3%
YouGov/University of Houston	Feb 6–18, 2020	1,352 (LV)	± 2.7%	20%	12%	11%	7%	20%	17%	–	8% (Note: Gabbard with 3%; Steyer with 1%; "No one/None of them" with 4%)	5%
	Feb 11, 2020	New Hampshire primary; Yang withdraws from the race										
YouGov/University of Texas/Texas Tribune	Jan 31-Feb 9, 2020	575 (LV)	± 4.09%	22%	10%	7%	3%	24%	15%	6%	13% (Note: Steyer with 3%; Gabbard with 2%; others with 8%)	–
University of Texas At Tyler/Dallas News	Jan 21–30, 2020	372 (LV)	± 4.8%	34%	16%	4%	3%	18%	17%	3%	5% (Note: Steyer with 2%; Bennet, Delaney and Gabbard with 1%; Patrick with <1%)	–
Data for Progress (Note: By the time of the sampling period, Data for Progress had endorsed the Elizabeth Warren 2020 presidential campaign)	Jan 16–21, 2020	615 (LV)	± 6.5%	26%	7%	10%	4%	20%	14%	3%	3% (Note: Steyer with 2%; Bennet with 1%; De La Fuente, Delaney, Gabbard and Patrick with 0%)	12%
Texas Lyceum	Jan 10–19, 2020	401 (LV)	± 4.89%	28%	9%	6%	4%	26%	13%	0%	5% (Note: Gabbard and Steyer with 2%; Booker with 1%; Bennet, Delaney, Patrick and Williamson with 0%; "none of the above" with 4%)	7%
	Jan 13, 2020	Booker withdraws from the race										
	Jan 2, 2020	Castro withdraws from the race										

Polling before January 2020
Poll source	Date(s) administered	Sample size	Margin of error	Joe Biden	Cory Booker	Pete Buttigieg	Julian Castro	Kamala Harris	Amy Klobuchar	Beto O'Rourke	Bernie Sanders	Elizabeth Warren	Andrew Yang	Other	Undecided
CNN/SSRS	Dec 4–8, 2019	327 (LV)	± 6.6%	35%	2%	9%	3%	–	1%	–	15%	13%	3%	11% (Note: Bloomberg with 5%; Steyer with 2%; Bennet, Gabbard, and Patrick with 1%; Delaney and Williamson with 0%; "Someone else" with 1%)	9%
	Dec 3, 2019	Harris withdraws from the race													
	Nov 24, 2019	Bloomberg announces his candidacy													
University of Texas at Tyler	Nov 5–14, 2019	427 (RV)	± 4.7%	28%	1%	8%	3%	5%	2%	–	18%	19%	2%	4% (Note: Steyer with 2%; Gabbard, Sestak and Williamson with 1%; Delaney with 0; Bennet, Bullock, and Messam with no voters)	–
	Nov 1, 2019	O'Rourke withdraws from the race													
University of Texas/ Texas Tribune	Oct 18–27, 2019	541	± 4.2%	23%	1%	6%	2%	5%	2%	14%	12%	18%	4%	4% (Note: Gabbard with 2%; Steyer and Williamson with 1%; Bennet, Bullock, Delaney, Messam and Sestak with 0%)	5%
University of Texas at Tyler	Sep 13–15, 2019	474 (RV)	± 4.5%	28%	6%	4%	4%	6%	0%	19%	17%	11%	1%	5% (Note: Bennet, Bullock, Delaney, Messam and Steyer with 1%; de Blasio, Gabbard, Ryan, Sestak, and Williamson with 0%)	–
Texas Tribune	Aug 29–Sep 15, 2019	550	± 4.2%	26%	1%	4%	3%	5%	1%	14%	12%	18%	3%	4% (Note: Gabbard with 2%; Ryan and Williamson with 1%; rest with 0%)	6%
Quinnipiac University	Sep 4–9, 2019	456	± 5.5%	28%	1%	3%	3%	5%	2%	12%	12%	18%	1	1% (Note: Delaney with 1%; Bennet, de Blasio, Bullock, Gabbard, Messam, Ryan, Sestak, Steyer and Williamson with 0%; would not vote with 1%)	12%
Univision/University of Houston	Aug 31– Sep 6, 2019	1004 (RV)	± 4.5%	20%	3%	1%	12%	5%	–	19%	13%	12%	1%	4% (Note: Steyer, Gabbard, Bennet, Delaney with 1%; Rest with 0%)	10%
Ragnar Research	Sep 3–5, 2019	600	± 3.9%	23%	1%	6%	2%	7%	–	12%	12%	15%	– (Note: Not listed separately)	7% (Note: Gabbard with 4%)	18%
Climate Nexus	Aug 20–25, 2019	639	–	24%	2%	3%	3%	7%	–	21%	12%	12%	1%	5% (Note: Gabbard, Ryan, Steyer, Delaney and Williamson with 1%; rest with 0%)	9%
TEXAS LYCEUM	Aug 16–25, 2019	358	± 5.2%	24%	2%	3%	4%	4%	3%	18%	13%	15%	2%	8% (Note: Bullock with 2%; Gabbard, Ryan, Bennet, McAuliffe, Moulton, Williamson with 1%; rest with 0%)	2%
Emerson College	Aug 1–3, 2019	400	± 4.9%	28%	2%	7%	2%	5%	<1%	19%	16%	14%	3%	5% (Note: Bennet, Gabbard, Messam, Ryan with 1%; de Blasio, Gillibrand, Sestak, Steyer, and Williamson with <1%; "someone else" with 1%)	–
YouGov/CBS News	Jul 9–18, 2019	910	± 4.2%	27%	0%	4%	4%	12%	1%	17%	12%	16%	1%	6% (Note: Delaney, Gabbard, Gillibrand, and Ryan with 1%; Bennet, Bullock, de Blasio, Gravel, Hickenlooper, Inslee, Messam, Moulton, Sestak, Steyer, and Williamson with 0%)	–
YouGov/University of Texas	May 31 – Jun 9, 2019	483	± 5.0%	23%	1%	8%	3%	5%	1%	15%	12%	14%	0%	8% (Note: Gabbard with 3%; Delaney, Gillibrand, Inslee, and Swalwell with 1%; Bennet, Bullock, de Blasio, Hickenlooper, Messam, Moulton, Ryan and Williamson with 0%; others with 1%)	7%
Quinnipiac University	May 29 – Jun 4, 2019	407	± 5.8%	30%	1%	3%	4%	4%	<1%	16%	15%	11%	1%	5% (Note: Delaney with 2%; Hickenlooper, Ryan, and Williamson with 1%; Bennet, Bullock, de Blasio, Gabbard, Gillibrand, Inslee, Messam, Moulton, and Swalwell with <1%)	8%
Change Research	May 30 – Jun 3, 2019	1,218	± 2.8%	24%	1%	8%	2%	8%	1%	27%	13%	12%	1%	2% (Note: Abrams with 2%; Bennet, de Blasio, Delaney, Gabbard, Gravel, Hickenlooper, Inslee, McAuliffe, Swalwell, and Williamson with 0%)	–
Emerson College	Apr 25–28, 2019	342	± 5.3%	23%	1%	8%	4%	3%	3%	22%	17%	7%	3%	11% (Note: Delaney, Gillibrand, Gravel and Hickenlooper with 1%; Messam, Ryan, Swalwell and Williamson with 0%; "someone else" with 7%)	–
	Apr 25, 2019	Biden announces his candidacy													
Change Research	Apr 18–22, 2019	1,578	± 2.5%	20%	2%	15%	4%	5%	1%	25%	19%	5%	1%	2% (Note: Abrams and Swalwell with 1%; Gabbard, Gillibrand, Hickenlooper, Inslee, and Ryan with 0%)	–
Change Research	Apr 18–22, 2019	1,578	± 2.5%	–	4%	21%	5%	8%	1%	33%	23%	5%	0%	0% (Note: Delaney, Gabbard, Gillibrand, Gravel, Hickenlooper, Inslee, Ryan and Williamson with 0%)	–

== Utah primary ==
The Utah Democratic primary was held on March 3, 2020.

Polling Aggregation
Source of poll aggregation	Date updated	Dates polled	Bernie Sanders	Joe Biden	Michael Bloomberg	Elizabeth Warren	Tulsi Gabbard	Other/ Undecided
270 to Win	March 3, 2020	Feb 22–March 2, 2020	26.3%	21.7%	18.7%	13.3%	1.5%	20.0%
FiveThirtyEight	March 3, 2020	Until March 2, 2020	26.3%	20.0%	18.2%	14.6%	1.3%	20.9%
Average			26.3%	20.9%	18.5%	14.0%	1.4%	20.5%
Utah primary results (March 3, 2020)			36.1%	18.4%	15.4%	16.2%	0.8%	13.0%

Tabulation of individual polls of the 2020 Utah Democratic Primary
Poll source	Date(s) administered	Sample size	Margin of error	Joe Biden	Michael Bloomberg	Pete Buttigieg	Amy Klobuchar	Bernie Sanders	Elizabeth Warren	Andrew Yang	Other	Undecided
	Mar 2, 2020	Klobuchar withdraws from the race										
Swayable	Mar 1–2, 2020	143 (LV)	± 9.0%	27%	29%	7%	6%	22%	6%	–	2% (Note: Gabbard and Steyer with 1%; "Other" with 0%)	–
Data for Progress	Feb 28–Mar 2, 2020	622 (LV)	± 3.9%	23%	17%	7%	3%	29%	19%	–	2% (Note: Gabbard with 2%)	–
	Mar 1, 2020	Buttigieg withdraws from the race										
HarrisX/University of Utah/Deseret News	Feb 22–26, 2020	298 (LV)	± 5.7%	6%	19%	18%	4%	28%	15%	–	1% (Note: Not specified in release)	8%
	Feb 11, 2020	New Hampshire primary; Yang withdraws from the race										
Salt Lake Tribune/Suffolk	Jan 18–22, 2020	132 (LV)	± 8.5%	12%	10%	5%	3%	27%	14%	5%	4% (Note: Gabbard and Steyer with 1%)	21%

== Vermont primary ==
The Vermont Democratic primary was held on March 3, 2020.

Polling Aggregation
Source of poll aggregation	Date updated	Dates polled	Bernie Sanders	Elizabeth Warren	Joe Biden	Michael Bloomberg	Tulsi Gabbard	Other/ Undecided
270 to Win	March 3, 2020	February 4–March 2, 2020	52.0%	14.0%	10.7%	10.3%	1.0%	12.0%
RealClear Politics	March 3, 2020	Insufficient recent polling to supply an average.						
FiveThirtyEight	March 3, 2020	until March 2, 2020	53.0%	14.2%	10.4%	8.9%	0.9%	12.6%
Average			52.5%	14.1%	10.55%	9.6%	0.95%	12.3%
Vermont primary results (March 3, 2020)			50.6%	12.5%	21.9%	9.4%	0.8%	4.8%

Tabulation of individual polls of the 2020 Vermont Democratic Primary
Poll source	Date(s) administered	Sample size	Margin of error	Joe Biden	Michael Bloomberg	Pete Buttigieg	Amy Klobuchar	Bernie Sanders	Elizabeth Warren	Other	Un- decided
	Mar 2, 2020	Klobuchar withdraws from the race									
Swayable	Mar 1–2, 2020	147 (LV)	± 11.0%	11%	16%	5%	2%	48%	17%	2% (Note: Gabbard with 0%; Steyer with no voters; "Other" with 2%)	–
Data for Progress	Feb 28–Mar 2, 2020	236 (LV)	± 6.9%	16%	8%	1%	–	57%	16%	2% (Note: Gabbard with 2%)	–
	Mar 1, 2020	Buttigieg withdraws from the race									
Vermont Public Radio	Feb 4–10, 2020	332 (LV)	± 4.0%	5%	7%	9%	4%	51%	13%	2% (Note: Yang with 2%; Gabbard with 1%)	7%

== Virginia primary ==
The Virginia Democratic primary was held on March 3, 2020.

Polling Aggregation
Source of poll aggregation	Date updated	Dates Polled	Joe Biden	Bernie Sanders	Michael Bloomberg	Elizabeth Warren	Tulsi Gabbard	Un- decided
270 to Win	March 3, 2020	Until March 3, 2020	28.8%	20.0%	17.3%	10.3%	0.7%	23.9% (Note: Compared to the other figures, this might be unusually high)
RealClear Politics	March 3, 2020	Until March 3, 2020	44.0%	24.5%	14.0%	15.0%	0.0%	2.5%
FiveThirtyEight	Mar 3, 2020	until Mar 3, 2020	39.9%	21.0%	13.2%	12.3%	0.5%	13.1%
Average			37.6%	21.8%	14.1%	12.5%	0.4%	13.2%
Virginia primary results (March 3, 2020)			53.3%	23.1%	9.7%	10.8%	0.9%	2.2%

Tabulation of individual polls of the 2020 Virginia Democratic Primary
Poll source	Date(s) administered	Sample size	Margin of error	Joe Biden	Michael Bloomberg	Cory Booker	Pete Buttigieg	Kamala Harris	Amy Klobuchar	Beto O'Rourke	Bernie Sanders	Elizabeth Warren	Other	Un- decided
	Mar 2, 2020	Klobuchar withdraws from the race												
Swayable	Mar 1–2, 2020	1,435 (LV)	± 4.0%	36%	20%	–	4%	–	3%	–	20%	11%	6% (Note: Steyer with 3%; Gabbard with 0%; "Other" with 3%)	–
AtlasIntel	Mar 1–2, 2020	545 (LV)	± 4.0%	42%	11%	–	1%	–	1%	–	28%	10%	3% (Note: Gabbard with 1%; "Other" with 2%)	4%
Change Research	Mar 1–2, 2020	510 (LV)	–	45%	10%	–	–	–	4%	–	25%	13%	3% (Note: Not yet released)	–
Data for Progress	Feb 28–Mar 2, 2020	327 (LV)	± 5.4%	39%	18%	–	–	–	–	–	24%	17%	1% (Note: Gabbard with 1%)	–
	Mar 1, 2020	Buttigieg withdraws from the race												
Data for Progress	Feb 23 – 25, 2020	499 (LV)	± 4.5%	19%	17%	–	12%	–	5%	–	28%	17%	2% (Note: Gabbard and Steyer with 1%)	–
Monmouth University	Feb 13 – 16, 2020	400 (LV)	± 4.9%	18%	22%	–	11%	–	9%	–	22%	5%	1% (Note: Gabbard with 1%; Steyer with 0%)	11%
Monmouth University	Feb 13 – 16, 2020	400 (LV)	± 4.9%	51% (Note: If only the two candidates for which percentages are listed could be voted for)	–	–	–	–	–	–	38%	–	4% (Note: "Already voted" with 1%; "neither" with 3%)	7%
Monmouth University	Feb 13 – 16, 2020	400 (LV)	± 4.9%	–	47% (Note: If only the two candidates for which percentages are listed could be voted for)	–	–	–	–	–	41%	–	5% (Note: "Already voted" with 1%; "neither" with 4%)	7%
Monmouth University	Feb 13 – 16, 2020	400 (LV)	± 4.9%	–	–	–	42% (Note: If only the two candidates for which percentages are listed could be voted for)	–	–	–	44%	–	7% (Note: "Already voted" with 1%; "neither" with 6%)	7%
Monmouth University	Feb 13 – 16, 2020	400 (LV)	± 4.9%	–	–	–	–	–	42% (Note: If only the two candidates for which percentages are listed could be voted for)	–	45%	–	6% (Note: "Already voted" with 1%; "neither" with 5%)	7%
Christopher Newport University	Feb 3 – 23, 2020	561 (LV)	± 4.3%	22%	13%	–	8%	–	5%	–	17%	8%	6% (Note: Andrew Yang with 5%; Steyer with 1%; Michael Bennet with 0%)	16% (Note: Undecided with 13%; Don't know/Refused with 3%)
	Jan 13, 2020	Booker withdraws from the race												
	Dec 3, 2019	Harris withdraws from the race												
	Nov 24, 2019	Bloomberg announces his candidacy												
	Nov 1, 2019	O'Rourke withdraws from the race												
University of Mary Washington	Sep 3 – 15, 2019	882 (RV)	± 3.3%	23%	–	1%	4%	5%	2%	1%	9%	9%	46% (Note: Yang with 2%; Castro with 1%; Non-voter/no answer with 43%)	–
Hampton University	May 29 – Jun 6, 2019	1,126 (RV)	± 4.3%	36%	–	2%	11%	7%	<1%	3%	17%	13%	10% (Note: Castro with 2%; Bullock, Gillibrand, and Yang with 1%; Bennet, de Blasio, Delaney, Gabbard, Hickenlooper, Inslee, Moulton, Ryan, Swalwell, and Williamson with <1%; Messam with 0%; others with 5%)	–
Change Research	Apr 26–30, 2019	551 (LV)	± 4.2%	41%	–	3%	12%	5%	1%	4%	20%	10%	5% (Note: Castro with 2%; Abrams, Swalwell, and Yang with 1%; Delaney, Gabbard, Gillibrand, Inslee, Ryan, and Williamson with 0%)	–

== Idaho primary ==
The Idaho Democratic primary is scheduled to take place on March 10, 2020.

Poll source	Date(s) administered	Sample size	Margin of error	Joe Biden	Tulsi Gabbard	Bernie Sanders	Other	Undecided
Swayable	Mar 8–9, 2020	833 (LV)	± 7%	52%	2%	37%	9%	–
Data for Progress	Mar 7–9, 2020	329 (LV)	± 5.4%	51%	2%	47%	–	–

== Michigan primary ==
The Michigan Democratic primary is scheduled to take place on March 10, 2020.

Polling aggregation
Source of poll aggregation	Date updated	Dates polled	Joe Biden	Bernie Sanders	Tulsi Gabbard	Other/ Undecided (Note: Calculated by taking the difference of 100% and all other candidates combined)
270 to Win	Mar 10, 2020	Mar 4–9, 2020	57.0%	32.3%	1.3%	9.4%
RealClear Politics	Mar 10, 2020	Mar 4–9, 2020	55.7%	33.3%	1.3%	9.7%
FiveThirtyEight	Mar 10, 2020	until Mar 9, 2020 (Note: FiveThirtyEight aggregates polls with a trendline regression of polls rather than a strict average of recent polls.)	55.3%	31.9%	1.2%	11.6%
Average			56.0%	32.5%	1.3%	10.2%
Michigan primary results (March 10, 2020)			52.9%	36.4%	0.6%	10.1%

Tabulation of individual polls of the 2020 Michigan Democratic primary
Poll source	Date(s) administered	Sample size	Margin of error	Joe Biden	Michael Bloomberg	Cory Booker	Pete Buttigieg	Kamala Harris	Amy Klobuchar	Beto O'Rourke	Bernie Sanders	Elizabeth Warren	Andrew Yang	Other	Undecided
Swayable	Mar 9, 2020	3,126 (LV)	± 3.0%	62%	–	–	–	–	–	–	28%	–	–	10% (Note: Gabbard with 1%; "Other" with 9%)	–
AtlasIntel	Mar 7–9, 2020	528 (LV)	± 4.0%	48%	3%	–	–	–	–	–	40%	1%	–	3% (Note: Gabbard with 2%; "Other" with 1%)	5%
Data for Progress	Mar 7–9, 2020	320 (LV)	± 5.5%	59%	–	–	–	–	–	–	38%	–	–	2% (Note: Gabbard with 2%)	–
Mitchell Research & Communications	Mar 8, 2020	602 (LV)	± 4.0%	54%	1%	–	1%	–	1%	–	33%	3%	–	3% (Note: Steyer with 1%; "Someone else" with 2%)	5%
Target Insyght	Mar 8, 2020	600 (LV)	± 4.0%	65%	2%	–	–	–	1%	–	24%	3%	–	3% (Note: Steyer with 0%; "Other" with 1%; "Uncommitted" with 3%)	1%
Concord Public Opinion Partners/ The Welcome Party	Mar 7–8, 2020	305 (LV)	–	54%	–	–	–	–	–	–	23%	–	–	1% (Note: Gabbard with 1%)	22%
YouGov/Yahoo News	Mar 6–8, 2020	–(RV) (Note: Part of a 1,750 registered voter poll of Michigan, Pennsylvania, and Wisconsin)	± 5.8%	54%	–	–	–	–	–	–	42%	–	–	–	–
Monmouth University	Mar 5–8, 2020	411 (LV)	± 4.8%	51%	3%	–	<1%	–	<1%	–	36%	1%	–	7% (Note: Gabbard with 1%; Steyer with 0%; "Uncommitted" with 6%)	2%
ROI Rocket	Mar 4–8, 2020	1,000 (LV)	± 3.1%	55%	–	–	–	–	–	–	45%	–	–	–	–
The Progress Campaign (D)	Mar 3–7, 2020	417 (RV)	± 4.7%	51%	–	–	–	–	–	–	44%	–	–	1%	4% (Note: Listed as "undecided/would not vote")
EPIC-MRA/Detroit Free Press	Mar 4–6, 2020	400 (LV)	± 4.9%	51%	–	–	–	–	–	–	27%	–	–	9% (Note: "Other" with 9%)	13% (Note: "Declined" with 13%)
	Mar 5, 2020	Warren withdraws from the race													
	Mar 4, 2020	Bloomberg withdraws from the race													
	Mar 2, 2020	Klobuchar withdraws from the race													
	Mar 1, 2020	Buttigieg withdraws from the race													
GlenGariff Group Inc./Detroit News/WDIV-TV	Feb 28 – Mar 2, 2020	600 (LV)	± 4.0%	29%	11%	–	6%	–	3%	–	23%	7%	–	6% (Note: Gabbard with 1%; Bennet, Booker, Delaney, Steyer, and Williamson with 0%; Castro and Sestak with no voters; "Refused" with 5%)	16%
	Feb 29, 2020	South Carolina primary; Steyer withdraws from the race after close of polls													
YouGov/University of Wisconsin-Madison	Feb 11–20, 2020	662 (LV)	–	16%	13%	–	11%	–	8%	–	25%	13%	–	–	14% (Note: "Not sure/other" with 14%)
	Feb 11, 2020	New Hampshire primary; Yang withdraws from the race after close of polls													
Baldwin Wallace University/Oakland; University/Ohio Northern University	Jan 8–20, 2020	477 (RV)	–	27%	9.1%	–	6.3%	–	1.9%	–	21.6%	13.6%	3.5%	5.3% (Note: Steyer with 1.7%; Delaney with 1.6%; Bennet with 0.8%; Gabbard with 0.7%; Patrick with 0.5%)	10.6%
	Jan 13, 2020	Booker withdraws from the race													
	Dec 3, 2019	Harris withdraws from the race													
	Nov 24, 2019	Bloomberg announces his candidacy													
Emerson College	Oct 31 – Nov 3, 2019	454	± 4.6%	34%	–	3%	8%	3%	0%	–	28%	19%	2%	3% (Note: Gabbard with 1%; Bennet, Bullock, Castro, Delaney, Sestak, and Williamson with 0%; Someone else with 2%)	–
	Nov 1, 2019	O'Rourke withdraws from the race													
Siena Research/New York Times	Oct 13–26, 2019	203	–	30%	–	0%	3%	0%	1%	0%	17%	21%	1%	1% (Note: Gabbard with 1%; others with 0%)	23%
Kaiser Family Foundation	Sep 23 – Oct 15, 2019	208 (LV)	–	19%	–	1%	7%	2%	1%	1%	15%	25%	1%	0% (Note: Castro and Steyer with no voters; someone else with 0%)	27%
Denno Research	Sep 21–24, 2019	217	–	27%	–	1%	4%	4%	1%	1%	12%	23%	1%	4% (Note: Bennet with 2%; Gabbard, Delaney with 1%; Bullock, Castro, Messam, Ryan, Sestak, Steyer and Williamson with 0%)	23% (Note: Labelled as "Other/unsure")
Climate Nexus	Jul 14–17, 2019	324 (LV)	–	35%	–	2%	4%	8%	1%	1%	16%	14%	1%	2% (Note: Gabbard and Steyer with 1%; Bennet, de Blasio, Bullock, Castro, Delaney, Gillibrand, Gravel, Hickenlooper, Inslee, Messam, Moulton, Ryan, Sestak and Williamson with 0%)	13% (Note: Labelled as "Other/unsure")
Zogby Analytics	May 23–29, 2019	268	± 6.0%	27%	–	1%	9%	7%	1%	4%	18%	8%	2%	5% (Note: Castro, Delaney, Gabbard, Gillibrand, and Hickenlooper with 1%; Inslee with 0%)	–
Denno Research	May 8–10, 2019	235	–	37%	–	3%	5%	4%	1%	1%	16%	9%	0%	4% (Note: Bennet, Gabbard, Gillibrand, and Swalwell with 1%; Castro, Delaney, Gravel, Hickenlooper, Inslee, Messam, Moulton, Ryan, Williamson, and Yang with 0%)	23%
	Apr 25, 2019	Biden announces his candidacy													
	Apr 14, 2019	Buttigieg announces his candidacy													
	Mar 14, 2019	O'Rourke announces his candidacy													
Emerson College	Mar 7–10, 2019	317	± 5.5%	40%	–	3%	0%	12%	5%	2%	23%	11%	–	4% (Note: Gillibrand and Hickenlooper with 1%; Castro, Gabbard, and Inslee with 0%; others with 3%)	–

== Mississippi primary ==
The Mississippi Democratic primary is scheduled to take place on March 10, 2020.

Polling aggregation
Source of poll aggregation	Date updated	Dates polled	Joe Biden	Bernie Sanders	Tulsi Gabbard	Other/ Undecided
270toWin	March 10, 2020	March 4–9, 2020	72.5%	25.0%	0.5%	2.0%
FiveThirtyEight	March 10, 2020	until March 9, 2020	70.7%	23.4%	0.4%	5.5%
Average			71.6%	24.2%	0.5%	3.7%
Mississippi primary results (March 10, 2020)			81.1%	14.8%	0.4%	3.7%

Tabulation of individual polls of the 2020 Mississippi Democratic primary
Poll source	Date(s) administered	Sample size	Margin of error	Joe Biden	Cory Booker	Pete Buttigieg	Kamala Harris	Bernie Sanders	Elizabeth Warren	Other	Undecided
Swayable	Mar 8–9, 2020	1,247 (LV)	± 4.0%	68%	–	–	–	28%	–	4% (Note: Gabbard with 0%; "Other" with 4%)	–
Data for Progress	Mar 4–7, 2020	340 (LV)	± 5.1%	77%	–	–	–	22%	–	1% (Note: Gabbard with 1%)	–
	Mar 5, 2020	Warren withdraws from the race									
	Mar 4, 2020	Bloomberg withdraws from the race									
	Mar 2, 2020	Klobuchar withdraws from the race									
	Mar 1, 2020	Buttigieg withdraws from the race									
	Jan 13, 2020	Booker withdraws from the race									
	Dec 3, 2019	Harris withdraws from the race									
NBC News/SurveyMonkey	Jul 2–16, 2019	282 (RV)	± 4.2%	47%	3%	3%	8%	21%	7%	5% (Note: Bennet with 3%; Williamson with 2%; Gillibrand, Inslee, and Klobuchar with 1%; Bullock, Castro, de Blasio, Delaney, Gabbard, Gravel, Hickenlooper, Messam, Moulton, O'Rourke, Ryan, and Yang with 0%)	3%
Chism Strategies/Millsaps College	Jun 20–21, 2019	523 (LV)	± 4.3%	50%	2%	2%	5%	7%	7%	6% (Note: Bennet, de Blasio, Delaney, Klobuchar, O'Rourke, and Swalwell with 1%; Bullock, Hickenlooper, Williamson, and Yang with 0%)	21%

== Missouri primary ==
The Missouri Democratic primary is scheduled to take place on March 10, 2020.

Polling aggregation
Source of poll aggregation	Date updated	Dates polled	Joe Biden	Bernie Sanders	Tulsi Gabbard	Other/ Undecided
270 to Win	March 10, 2020	March 4–9, 2020	57.6%	34.4%	2.7%	5.3%
RealClear Politics	March 10, 2020	March 4–9, 2020	61.0%	30.7%	2.5%	5.8%
FiveThirtyEight	March 10, 2020	until March 9, 2020	60.3%	32.6%	2.5%	4.6%
Average			59.6%	32.6%	2.6%	5.2%
Missouri primary results (March 10, 2020)			60.1%	34.6%	0.7%	4.6%

Tabulation of individual polls of the 2020 Missouri Democratic primary
Poll source	Date(s) administered	Sample size	Margin of error	Joe Biden	Michael Bloomberg	Pete Buttigieg	Kamala Harris	Amy Klobuchar	Beto O'Rourke	Bernie Sanders	Elizabeth Warren	Other	Undecided
Swayable	Mar 9, 2020	2,037 (LV)	± 3.0%	57%	–	–	–	–	–	36%	–	8% (Note: Gabbard with 3%; "Other" with 5%)	–
Øptimus	Mar 7–9, 2020	402 (LV)	± 5.4%	68%	–	–	–	–	–	29%	–	3% (Note: Gabbard with 3%)	–
Data for Progress	Mar 4–7, 2020	348 (LV)	± 5.3%	62%	–	–	–	–	–	32%	4%	2% (Note: Gabbard with 2%)	–
	Mar 5, 2020	Warren withdraws from the race											
Remington Research Group/Missouri Scout	Mar 4–5, 2020	1,040 (LV)	± 3.0%	53%	–	–	–	–	–	31%	–	10% (Note: "Other" with 10%)	6%
Emerson Polling/Nexstar	Mar 4–5, 2020	425 (LV)	± 4.7%	48%	–	–	–	–	–	44%	–	8% (Note: Gabbard with 2%; "Someone else/undecided" with 6%)	<6%
	Mar 4, 2020	Bloomberg withdraws from the race											
	Mar 2, 2020	Klobuchar withdraws from the race											
	Mar 1, 2020	Buttigieg withdraws from the race											
The Progress Campaign (D)	Feb 16–23, 2020	294 (RV)	± 5.1%	29%	14%	13%	–	4%	–	23%	12%	4% (Note: Gabbard and Steyer with 2%)	–
Americana Analytics	Feb 20–21, 2020	1,198 (LV)	± 2.83%	22%	17%	11%	–	9%	–	11%	10%	1% (Note: Steyer with 1%; Gabbard with 0%)	17%
Remington Research Group	Jan 22–23, 2020	1,460 (LV)	–	39%	14%	6%	–	8%	–	7%	9%	3% (Note: Yang with 2%; Steyer with 1%)	14%
	Dec 3, 2019	Harris withdraws from the race											
	Nov 1, 2019	O'Rourke withdraws from the race											
Show Me Victories	Sept 13–16, 2019	400	± 5%	34%	–	10%	9%	1%	4%	14%	22%	8% (Note: Booker and Yang with 1%; Castro with <1%; rest with 0%; Someone else with 6%)	–
Remington Research Group	Jul 10–11, 2019	1,122	–	43%	–	5%	13%	–	1%	4%	15%	–	19%

== North Dakota caucus ==
The North Dakota Democratic caucus is scheduled to take place on March 10, 2020.

Poll source	Date(s) administered	Sample size	Margin of error	Joe Biden	Tulsi Gabbard	Bernie Sanders	Other	Undecided
Swayable	Mar 7–9, 2020	383 (LV)	± 9%	65%	0%	31%	4%	–

== Washington primary ==
The Washington Democratic primary is scheduled to take place on March 10, 2020.

Polling aggregation
Source of poll aggregation	Date updated	Dates polled	Joe Biden	Bernie Sanders	Tulsi Gabbard	Un- decided (Note: Calculated by taking the difference of 100% and all other candidates combined)
270 to Win	Mar 10, 2020	Feb 15 – Mar 9, 2020	33.5%	34.0%	1.3%	34.7%
RealClear Politics	Mar 9, 2020	No averages at this time				
FiveThirtyEight	Mar 10, 2020	until Mar 9, 2020	39.8%	37.1%	1.4%	21.7%
Average			36.65%	36.55%	1.35%	28.2%

Tabulation of individual polls of the 2020 Washington Democratic primary
Poll source	Date(s) administered	Sample size	Margin of error	Joe Biden	Michael Bloomberg	Pete Buttigieg	Kamala Harris	Jay Inslee	Amy Klobuchar	Bernie Sanders	Elizabeth Warren	Andrew Yang	Other	Undecided
Swayable	Mar 9, 2020	1,840 (LV)	± 3.0%	39%	–	–	–	–	–	37%	–	–	25% (Note: Gabbard with 1%; Other with 24%)	–
Data for Progress	Mar 7–9, 2020	497 (LV)	± 5.1%	49%	–	–	–	–	–	43%	6%	–	2% (Note: Gabbard with 2%)	–
Survey USA/KING-TV	Mar 4–6, 2020	550 (LV)	± 5.4%	36%	–	–	–	–	–	35%	10%	–	13% (Note: "Some Other Democrat" with 13%)	5%
	Mar 5, 2020	Warren withdraws from the race												
Data for Progress	Mar 4–5, 2020	737 (LV)	± 3.6%	47%	–	–	–	–	–	44%	5% (Note: Estimated early vote share; respondents in the poll who indicated Warren as their first choice but that they had not yet voted were assigned to their indicated second choice.)	–	3% (Note: Gabbard with 3%)	–
	Mar 4, 2020	Bloomberg withdraws from the race												
	Mar 2, 2020	Klobuchar withdraws from the race												
	Mar 1, 2020	Buttigieg withdraws from the race												
Elway Research/Cascade Public Media	Feb 15–18, 2020	404 (LV)	± 5.0%	10%	15%	9%	–	–	11%	21%	11%	0%	2% (Note: Gabbard with 1%; Delaney with 0%; Steyer, Bennet, Patrick, and Booker with no voters; "other" with 1%)	22%
	Feb 11, 2020	Yang withdraws from the race												
Survey USA/KING-TV	Jan 26–28, 2020	536 (LV)	± 6.2%	21%	12%	8%	–	–	3%	26%	16%	4%	2% (Note: Steyer with 2%; Gabbard with 0%; "Some Other Democrat" with 0%)	7%
	Dec 3, 2019	Harris withdraws from the race												
	Aug 21, 2019	Inslee withdraws from the race												
Zogby Analytics	Jul 22 – Aug 1, 2019	1,265 (LV)	± 2.8%	19%	–	5%	9%	6%	1%	18%	14%	2%	11% (Note: Castro, Gillibrand, and O'Rourke with 2%; Booker, Delaney, Gabbard, and Hickenlooper with 1% ; Someone else with 1%)	16%

== Arizona primary ==
The Arizona Democratic primary is scheduled to take place on March 17, 2020.

Polling aggregation
Source of poll aggregation	Date updated	Dates polled	Joe Biden	Bernie Sanders	Tulsi Gabbard	Other/ Undecided
270 to Win	Mar 17, 2020	Mar 3–16, 2020	50.6%	29.4%	1.0%	19.0%
RealClear Politics	Mar 17, 2020	Mar 6–15, 2020	51.7%	33.7%	1.0%	13.6%
FiveThirtyEight	Mar 17, 2020	until Mar 16, 2020	51.6%	26.9%	1.1%	20.4%
Average			51.3%	30.0%	1.0%	17.7%

Tabulation of individual polls of the 2020 Arizona Democratic primary
Poll source	Date(s) administered	Sample size	Margin of error	Joe Biden	Michael Bloomberg	Pete Buttigieg	Kamala Harris	Bernie Sanders	Elizabeth Warren	Andrew Yang	Other	Undecided
Swayable	Mar 16, 2020	1,167 (LV)	± 5.0%	53%	–	–	–	29%	–	–	19% (Note: Gabbard with 1%; "Other" with 18%)	–
Marist/NBC News	Mar 10–15, 2020	523 (LV)	± 6.0%	53%	–	–	–	36%	–	–	8% (Note: Gabbard with 1%; "Other" with 7%)	3%
Marist/NBC News	Mar 10–15, 2020	913 (RV)	± 4.5%	50%	–	–	–	37%	–	–	9% (Note: Gabbard with 2%; "Other" with 7%)	5%
Monmouth University	Mar 11–14, 2020	373 (LV)	± 5.1%	51%	5%	3%	–	31%	3%	–	2% (Note: Gabbard and Klobuchar with 1%; "Other" with <1%)	5%
Latino Decisions/Univision/ Arizona State University	Mar 6–11, 2020	541 (LV)	± 4.2%	57% (Note: In a two-person race)	–	–	–	38%	–	–	–	5%
Latino Decisions/Univision/ Arizona State University	Mar 6–11, 2020	541 (LV)	± 4.2%	51%	–	–	–	34%	–	–	6% (Note: Gabbard with 1%; "Other" with 5%)	8%
	March 4–5, 2020	Bloomberg and Warren withdraw from the race										
OH Predictive Insights	Mar 3–4, 2020	398 (LV)	± 4.9%	45%	12%	–	–	17%	13%	–	4% (Note: "Another Candidate" with 4%)	9%
	March 1–2, 2020	Buttigieg and Klobuchar withdraw from the race										
	February 11, 2020	New Hampshire primary; Yang withdraws from the race after close of polls										
	Dec 3, 2019	Harris withdraws from the race										
OH Predictive Insights	Oct 31 – Nov 8, 2019	260 (LV)	± 6.1%	29%	–	9%	5%	16%	18%	4%	19% (Note: Booker, Castro and Klobuchar with 2%; Bennet, Gabbard, O'Rourke and Steyer with 1%; Delaney with 0%; Bullock and Williamson with no voters; other with 7%)	–
Emerson Polling	Oct 25–28, 2019	339	± 5.2%	28%	–	12%	4%	21%	21%	5%	7% (Note: Gabbard, Klobuchar and O'Rourke with 2%; Sestak with 1%; Bennet, Booker, Bullock, Castro, Delaney, Steyer and Williamson with 0%; someone else with 2%)	–
Siena Research/New York Times	Oct 13–26, 2019	209	–	24%	–	5%	3%	16%	15%	1%	1% (Note: Klobuchar with 1%; Booker, Gabbard and O'Rourke with 0%; others with 0%)	31%
Change Research	Sep 27–28, 2019	396 (LV)	–	15%	–	13%	4%	19%	35%	8%	7% (Note: O'Rourke with 3%; Booker, Castro, Gabbard and Klobuchar with 1%; Steyer with 0%)	–
Bendixen&Amandi	Sep 9–12, 2019	250	± 4.3%	29%	–	5%	4%	18%	24%	2%	8% (Note: O'Rourke with 4%; Castro, Klobuchar and Williamson with 1%; someone else with 1%)	10%
Zogby Analytics	May 23–29, 2019	197	± 7.0%	35%	–	6%	4%	16%	10%	0%	11% (Note: Booker, Castro, Delaney, and O'Rourke with 2%; Gabbard, Gillibrand, and Hickenlooper with 1%; Inslee and Klobuchar with 0%)	–

== Florida primary ==
The Florida Democratic primary is scheduled to take place on March 17, 2020.

Polling Aggregation
Source of poll aggregation	Date updated	Dates polled	Joe Biden	Bernie Sanders	Tulsi Gabbard	Other/ Undecided
270 to Win	Mar 17, 2020	Mar 5–16, 2020	65.5%	23.0%	1.8%	9.7%
RealClear Politics	Mar 17, 2020	Mar 6–12, 2020	64.7%	25.7%	2.0%	7.6%
FiveThirtyEight	Mar 17, 2020	until Mar 16, 2020	63.8%	24.7%	1.4%	10.1%
Average			64.7%	24.5%	1.7%	9.1%

Polling from February 12, 2020, to March 17, 2020
Poll source	Date(s) administered	Sample size	Margin of error	Joe Biden	Michael Bloomberg	Pete Buttigieg	Amy Klobuchar	Bernie Sanders	Elizabeth Warren	Other	Un- decided
Swayable	Mar 16, 2020	4,035 (LV)	± 2.0%	64%	–	–	–	25%	–	12% (Note: Gabbard with 2%; "Other" with 10%)	–
AtlasIntel	Mar 14–16, 2020	532 (LV)	± 4.0%	67%	–	–	–	27%	–	4% (Note: Gabbard with 2%; "Other" with 2%)	2%
Point Blank Political	Mar 11–13, 2020	3,165 (LV)	± 2.3%	61%	–	–	–	32%	–	–	7%
Point Blank Political	Mar 11–13, 2020	3,165 (LV)	± 2.3%	57%	2%	2%	0%	29%	4%	1% (Note: Gabbard with 1%; Steyer with 0%)	5%
Emerson College/Nexstar	Mar 11–12, 2020	434 (LV)	± 4.7%	65%	–	–	–	27%	–	2% (Note: Gabbard with 2%)	6%
Gravis Marketing	Mar 10–12, 2020	516 (LV)	± 4.3%	66%	–	–	–	25%	–	–	9%
ROI Rocket	Mar 6–12, 2020	877 (LV)	± 3.3%	67%	–	–	–	27%	–	– (Note: Not yet released)	–
Latino Decisions/Univision	Mar 6–12, 2020	531 (LV)	± 4.3%	67%	–	–	–	32%	–	–	2%
Latino Decisions/Univision	Mar 6–12, 2020	531 (LV)	± 4.3%	63%	–	–	–	25%	–	8% (Note: Gabbard with 2%; "Other" with 6%)	4%
University of North Florida	Mar 5–10, 2020	1,502 (LV)	± 2.5%	66%	2%	1%	<1%	22%	2%	1% (Note: Gabbard with 1%; Yang with <1%)	7%
St Pete Polls/FloridaPolitics.com	Mar 6–8, 2020	2,480 (LV)	± 2.0%	69%	5%	2%	1%	14%	1%	0% (Note: Steyer with 0%)	9%
Point Blank Political	Mar 6–8, 2020	3,376 (LV)	± 2.3%	61%	–	–	–	32%	–	–	7%
Point Blank Political	Mar 6–8, 2020	3,376 (LV)	± 2.3%	55%	2%	2%	1%	29%	4%	2% (Note: Gabbard and Steyer with 1%)	7%
Florida Atlantic University	Mar 5–7, 2020	399 (LV)	± 4.9%	61%	–	–	–	25%	–	3% (Note: Gabbard with 3%)	10%
	Mar 4–5, 2020	Bloomberg and Warren withdraw from the race									
St Pete Polls/FloridaPolitics.com	Mar 4, 2020	1,882 (LV)	± 2.3%	61%	14%	1%	1%	12%	5%	0% (Note: Steyer with 0%)	6%
	Mar 1–2, 2020	Buttigieg and Klobuchar withdraw from the race									
St Pete Polls	Feb 25–26, 2020	2,788 (LV)	± 1.9%	34%	25%	8%	4%	13%	5%	1% (Note: Steyer with 1%)	10%
Saint Leo University	Feb 17–22, 2020	342 (LV)	–	25%	25%	11%	5%	17%	7%	4% (Note: Gabbard with 2%; Steyer with 1%; "None of these" with 1%)	7%
Florida Southern College	Feb 17–21, 2020	313 (LV)	± 5.54%	22%	23%	9%	5%	18%	12%	1% (Note: Gabbard and Steyer with 0%; "Other" with 1%)	9%
St Pete Polls	Feb 18–19, 2020	2,412 (LV)	± 2.0%	27%	32%	8%	7%	11%	5%	2% (Note: Steyer with 2%)	10%
Tel Opinion Research/Politico/ Let’s Preserve the American Dream	Feb 13–18, 2020	800 (LV)	± 3.46%	20%	26%	8%	5%	13%	7%	5% (Note: Steyer with 2%; Gabbard, Bennet, and Yang with 1%)	16%
St Pete Polls	Feb 12–13, 2020	3,047 (LV)	± 1.8%	26%	27%	11%	9%	10%	5%	1% (Note: Steyer with 1%)	11%

Polling before February 11, 2020
Poll source	Date(s) administered	Sample size	Margin of error	Joe Biden	Michael Bloomberg	Cory Booker	Pete Buttigieg	Kamala Harris	Amy Klobuchar	Beto O'Rourke	Bernie Sanders	Elizabeth Warren	Andrew Yang	Other	Un- decided
	Feb 11, 2020	New Hampshire primary; Yang withdraws from the race after close of polls													
St. Pete Polls	Jan 27–28, 2020	2,590 (LV)	± 1.9%	41%	17%	–	6%	–	5%	–	9%	7%	2%	2% (Note: Steyer with 2%)	10%
Tel Opinion Research/Let’s Preserve the American Dream/Politico	Jan 21–23, 2020	600 (LV)	± 4%	41% (Note: If only Biden, Sanders and Warren remained as candidates)	–	–	–	–	–	–	21%	18%	–	–	20%
Tel Opinion Research/Let’s Preserve the American Dream/Politico	Jan 21–23, 2020	600 (LV)	± 4%	29%	4%	–	4%	–	4%	–	17%	12%	2%	2% (Note: Steyer with 2%)	28%
	Jan 13, 2020	Booker withdraws from the race													
Florida Atlantic University	Jan 9–12, 2020	494	± 4.4%	42%	7%	3%	3%	–	6%	–	16%	10%	5%	5% (Note: Steyer with 2%; Bennet, Delaney, and Gabbard 1%; Patrick with 0%)	4% (Note: Listed as "someone else/unsure")
	Dec 3, 2019	Harris withdraws from the race													
	Nov 24, 2019	Bloomberg announces his candidacy													
	Nov 1, 2019	O'Rourke withdraws from the race													
Siena College/New York Times	Oct 13–26, 2019	650 (RV)	± 4.4%	27%	–	0%	5%	1%	2%	0%	13%	19%	0%	1% (Note: Gabbard with 1%; others with 0%)	29%
Tel Opinion Research	Sep 15–18, 2019	800 (LV)	± 3.54%	43%	–	–	–	–	–	–	10%	26%	–	–	18%
Tel Opinion Research	Sep 15–18, 2019	800 (LV)	± 3.54%	37%	–	–	5%	6%	–	–	9%	18%	2%	–	20%
Tel Opinion Research	Sep 15–18, 2019	800 (LV)	± 3.54%	24%	–	–	2%	3%	–	–	5%	11%	1%	3% (Note: Listed as others)	49%
Florida Atlantic University	Sep 12–15, 2019	407	± 4.9%	34%	–	1%	5%	4%	0%	2%	14%	24%	2%	8% (Note: Messam with 3%; Bennet, de Blasio, Bullock, Gabbard and Ryan with 1%; Castro, Delaney, Sestak, Steyer and Williamson with 0%)	6%
St. Pete Polls	Jun 22–23, 2019	2,022	± 2.2%	47%	–	3%	8%	6%	–	2%	8%	12%	–	7%	6%
Change Research	Jun 16–17, 2019	1,130	± 2.9%	33%	–	2%	15%	7%	2%	3%	20%	15%	3%	2% (Note: Castro and Messam with 1%; Bennet, Delaney, Gabbard, Gillibrand, Gravel, Hickenlooper, Moulton, Ryan, and Williamson with 0%)	–
Quinnipiac University	Jun 12–17, 2019	417	± 5.8%	41%	–	1%	8%	6%	1%	1%	14%	12%	<1%	1% (Note: Bennet, Bullock, Castro, de Blasio, Delaney, Gabbard, Gillibrand, Gravel, Hickenlooper, Inslee, Messam, Moulton, Ryan, Swalwell, and Williamson with <1%; others with 1%)	12%
Climate Nexus	Jun 7–11, 2019	676	± 2.6%	32%	–	2%	6%	6%	1%	2%	16%	10%	2%	9% (Note: Delaney with 2%; Bennet, de Blasio, Hickenlooper, Inslee, Ryan, and Swalwell with 1%; Bullock, Castro, Gabbard, Gillibrand, Gravel, Messam, Moulton, and Williamson with 0%)	14%
Zogby Analytics	May 23–29, 2019	228	± 6.5%	34%	–	2%	6%	2%	1%	4%	18%	7%	1%	6% (Note: Gabbard and Gillibrand with 2%; Castro, and Inslee with 1%; Delaney and Hickenlooper with 0%)	–
Florida Atlantic University	May 16–19, 2019	403	± 4.9%	39%	–	1%	9%	7%	1%	5%	12%	12%	1%	14% (Note: Castro with 2%; Gillibrand, Gravel, and Moulton with 1%; Delaney, Gabbard, Hickenlooper, Inslee, Messam, Ryan, Swalwell, and Williamson with 0%; others with 9%)	–
Tel Opinion Research*	May 8, 2019	800	± 3.5%	39%	–	1%	3%	5%	1%	1%	16%	5%	–	–	28%
	Apr 25, 2019	Biden announces his candidacy													
	Apr 14, 2019	Buttigieg announces his candidacy													
Tel Opinion Research*	Mar 21, 2019	800	± 3.5%	37%	–	2%	–	4%	1%	5%	13%	6%	–	–	31%
	Mar 14, 2019	O'Rourke announces his candidacy													
Bendixen & Amandi International	Mar 1–4, 2019	300	–	26%	1%	1%	0%	9%	1%	1%	11%	4%	0%	0% (Note: Brown, Castro, Delaney, Gillibrand, Gabbard, Hickenlooper, and Inslee with 0%)	46%
	Feb 19, 2019	Sanders announces his candidacy													
	Feb 9, 2019	Warren announces her candidacy													
	Feb 1, 2019	Booker announces his candidacy													
	Jan 21, 2019	Harris announces her candidacy													
Saint Leo University	May 25–31, 2018	–	–	21%	–	3%	–	4%	–	–	11%	7%	–	34% (Note: Winfrey with 17%; Holder with 5%; Brown with 3%; Cuomo, Gillibrand, and Murphy with 2%; Bullock, Landrieu, Patrick, and McAuliffe with 1%; others with 2%)	17%

== Illinois primary ==
The Illinois Democratic primary is scheduled to take place on March 17, 2020.

Polling aggregation
Source of poll aggregation	Date updated	Dates polled	Joe Biden	Bernie Sanders	Tulsi Gabbard	Un- decided
270toWin	Mar 17, 2020	Mar 7–16, 2020	58.6%	30.2%	2.0%	9.2%
RealClear Politics	Mar 17, 2020	Mar 10–12, 2020	60.0%	30.5%	– (Note: Gabbard not averaged)	9.5%
FiveThirtyEight	Mar 17, 2020	until Mar 16, 2020	61.5%	26.6%	1.5%	10.4%
Average			60.0%	29.1%	1.8%	9.1%

Tabulation of individual polls of the 2020 Illinois Democratic primary
Poll source	Date(s) administered	Sample size	Margin of error	Joe Biden	Michael Bloomberg	Pete Buttigieg	Kamala Harris	Amy Klobuchar	Bernie Sanders	Elizabeth Warren	Other	Undecided
Swayable	Mar 16, 2020	1,861 (LV)	± 3.0%	63%	–	–	–	–	28%	–	10% (Note: Gabbard with 3%; "Other" with 7%)	–
Emerson College/Nexstar	Mar 11–12, 2020	567 (LV)	± 4.1%	57%	–	–	–	–	36%	–	2% (Note: Gabbard with 2%)	6%
Gravis Marketing	Mar 10–12, 2020	549 (LV)	± 4.2%	63%	–	–	–	–	25%	–	–	12%
ROI Rocket	Mar 6–12, 2020	960 (LV)	± 3.1%	57%	–	–	–	–	34%	–	–	–
Victory Research	Mar 7–9, 2020	1,200 (LV)	± 2.83%	55%	–	–	–	–	36%	–	1% (Note: Gabbard with 1%)	8%
Ogden & Fry/Northwest Side GOP Club	Mar 8, 2020	457(LV)	± 4.58%	64%	–	–	–	–	32%	–	4% (Note: Gabbard with 4%)	– (Note: Result after "Undecided" is ruled out as an option.)
Ogden & Fry/Northwest Side GOP Club	Mar 8, 2020	457(LV)	± 4.58%	55%	–	–	–	–	26%	–	2% (Note: Gabbard with 2%)	16%
	Mar 1–5, 2020	Buttigieg, Klobuchar, Bloomberg, and Warren withdraw from the race										
Victory Research	Feb 17–19, 2020	1,200(LV)	± 2.83%	20.3%	14.5%	11.4%	–	6.3%	25.6%	6.6%	4.4% (Note: Steyer with 3.4%; Gabbard with 1.0%)	10.9%
Southern Illinois University	Feb 10–17, 2020	475 (LV)	± 4.5%	14%	17%	13%	–	8%	22%	6%	2% (Note: Steyer and Yang with 1%; someone else with 1%)	17%
	Dec 3, 2019	Harris withdraws from the race										
Victory Research	Nov 27 – Dec 1, 2019	1,500 (RV)	±2.83%	23.2%	3.6%	15.9%	3.2%	2.6%	15.0%	17.4%	12.3% (Note: Patrick with 2.4%; Booker with 2.3%; Steyer with 1.8%; Castro with 1.6%; Yang with 1.0%; Gabbard with 0.9%; Williamson with 0.8%; Bennet with 0.6%; Bullock with 0.5%; Sestak with 0.3%; Delaney with 0.1%)	6.9%
Victory Research	Jul 26–29, 2019	1,200	± 2.83%	36.1%	–	9.3%	8.6%	1.7%	15.2%	12.8%	9.2% (Note: O'Rourke with 2.1%; Booker with 1.4%; Gillibrand with 1.0%; Steyer with 0.8%; Inslee with 0.7%; Castro with 0.6%; de Blasio with 0.4%; Bullock, Gabbard, Hickenlooper, Ryan, Williamson and Yang with 0.3%; Gravel with 0.2%; Moulton and Sestak with 0.1%; Delaney and Messam with 0.0%)	7.3%

== Wisconsin primary ==
The Wisconsin Democratic primary is scheduled to take place on April 7, 2020.

Polling aggregation
Source of poll aggregation	Date updated	Dates polled	Joe Biden	Bernie Sanders	Other/ Undecided
270 to Win	April 5, 2020	March 6–29, 2020	55.3%	37.0%	7.7%
RealClear Politics	April 5, 2020	March 6–29, 2020	55.3%	37.0%	7.7%
FiveThirtyEight	April 5, 2020	until March 29, 2020	51.6%	36.0%	12.4%
Average			54.1%	36.7%	9.2%

Tabulation of individual polls of the 2020 Wisconsin Democratic Primary
Poll source	Date(s) administered	Sample size	Margin of error	Joe Biden	Michael Bloomberg	Cory Booker	Pete Buttigieg	Kamala Harris	Amy Klobuchar	Bernie Sanders	Elizabeth Warren	Andrew Yang	Other	Un- decided
Marquette University Law School	Mar 24–29, 2020	394 (LV)	± 5.9%	62%	–	–	–	–	–	34%	–	–	–	4% (Note: Don't know with 2%; Refused to answer with 2%)
Public Policy Polling	Mar 10–11, 2020	898(LV)	–	55%	–	–	–	–	–	39%	–	–	3% (Note: Gabbard with 3%)	3%
YouGov/Yahoo News	Mar 6–8, 2020	–(RV)	± 6.4%	49%	–	–	–	–	–	38%	–	–	–	–
	Mar 1–5, 2020	Buttigieg, Klobuchar, Bloomberg, and Warren withdraw from the race												
Marquette University Law School	Feb 19–23, 2020	490 (LV)	± 5.1%	15%	17%	–	13%	–	11%	29%	9%	–	2% (Note: Gabbard and Steyer with 1%; "Someone else" with 0%)	4%
YouGov/University of Wisconsin-Madison	Feb 11–20, 2020	428 (LV)	–	13%	13%	–	12%	–	9%	30%	12%	–	–	11% (Note: "Not sure/other" with 11%)
	Feb 11, 2020	New Hampshire primary; Yang withdraws from the race after close of polls												
Baldwin Wallace University/Oakland University/Ohio Northern University	Jan 8–20, 2020	464 (RV)	–	21.8%	8.4%	–	7.7%	–	3%	28.4%	14.7%	2.2%	2.5% (Note: Gabbard with 0.8%; Patrick with 0.6%; Bennet and Delaney with 0.4%; Steyer with 0.3%)	10.9%
	Jan 13, 2020	Booker withdraws from the race												
Marquette University Law School	Jan 8–12, 2020	358 (LV)	± 6.3%	23%	6%	1%	15%	–	4%	19%	14%	6%	3% (Note: Gabbard and Steyer with 1%; Patrick and Williamson with 0%; someone else with 1%; Bennet and Delaney not reported)	9%
Fox News	Jan 5–8, 2020	671 (LV)	± 3.5%	23%	7%	3%	9%	–	4%	21%	13%	3%	6% (Note: Gabbard and Steyer with 2%; Williamson with 1%; Bennet, Delaney, and Patrick with 0%; none of the above with 1%)	10%
Marquette University Law School	Dec 3–8, 2019	358 (LV)	± 6.3%	23%	3%	4%	15%	–	3%	19%	16%	3%	3% (Note: Gabbard with 1%; Bennet, Castro, Delaney, Patrick, Steyer and Williamson with 0%; someone else with 1%; would not vote with 1%)	11%
	Dec 3, 2019	Harris withdraws from the race												
	Nov 24, 2019	Bloomberg announces his candidacy												
Marquette University Law School	Nov 13–17, 2019	801 (RV)	–	30%	–	3%	13%	2%	3%	17%	15%	2%	6% (Note: Bullock, Steyer, Williamson, someone else, Would not vote, and Refused with 1%; Bennet, Castro, and Delaney with 0%)	10%
Siena Research/New York Times	Oct 13–26, 2019	292	–	23%	–	1%	5%	1%	0%	20%	25%	2%	2% (Note: Gabbard and O'Rourke with 1%; others with 0%)	19%
Kaiser Family Foundation	Sep 23 – Oct 15, 2019	274 (LV)	–	17%	–	2%	6%	3%	3%	10%	22%	2%	1% (Note: O'Rourke with 1%; Steyer with 0%; Castro with no voters; other with 0%)	35%
Fox News	Sep 29 – Oct 2, 2019	663 (LV)	± 3.5%	28%	–	2%	7%	5%	2%	17%	22%	2%	5% (Note: Bullock, Gabbard and O'Rourke with 1%; Bennet, Delaney, Ryan, Sestak, Steyer, Williamson and Other with <1%; Castro and Messam with 0%; None of the above with 1%)	9%
Marquette University Law School	Aug 25–29, 2019	444 (RV)	± 5.3%	28%	–	1%	6%	3%	1%	20%	17%	2%	5% (Note: "Someone else", Bullock, Gillibrand, O'Rourke, Steyer with 1%; Bennet, Gabbard, Delaney, Castro, Ryan and Williamson with 0%)	13%
Change Research	Aug 9–11, 2019	935 (LV)	± 3.2%	20%	–	1%	9%	5%	2%	24%	29%	2%	5% (Note: Gabbard with 2%; Inslee, O'Rourke, Steyer, and Williamson with 1%; Bennet, Bullock, Castro, Delaney, Gillibrand, Hickenlooper, Messam, and Sestak with 0%)	–
Change Research	Jun 29 – Jul 4, 2019	1261 (LV)	–	18%	–	3%	15%	17%	1%	19%	19%	1%	6% (Note: Gabbard and O'Rourke with 2%; Castro, Delaney, Gillibrand and Inslee with 1%; Bennet, Bullock, Gravel, Hickenlooper, Moulton, Ryan, Swalwell and Williamson with 0%; Messam and Sestak with no voters)	–
Zogby Analytics	May 23–29, 2019	238 (LV)	± 6.4%	28%	–	2%	7%	7%	3%	13%	14%	0%	2% (Note: Castro, Gabbard, Gillibrand, and O'Rourke with 1%; Delaney, Hickenlooper, Inslee, and Yang with 0%)	–
	Apr 25, 2019	Biden announces his candidacy												
Zogby Analytics	Apr 15–18, 2019	485 (LV)	± 4.5%	24%	–	4%	10%	7%	4%	20%	6%	1%	11% (Note: O'Rourke with 5%; Hickenlooper with 2%; Castro, Gillibrand, and Yang with 1%; Delaney, Gabbard, and Inslee with 0%; others with 2%)	14%
	Apr 14, 2019	Buttigieg announces his candidacy												
Emerson College	Mar 15–17, 2019	324 (LV)	± 5.4%	24%	–	2%	1%	5%	4%	39%	14%	1%	10% (Note: O'Rourke with 6%; Gillibrand with 1%; Castro, Gabbard, Hickenlooper, and Inslee with 0%; others with 3%)	–

== Ohio primary ==
The Ohio Democratic primary was originally scheduled to take place on March 17, 2020. Due to the COVID-19 pandemic, the primary was delayed. Initially, the Governor suggested the primary be held on June 2, 2020, however, further deliberations resulted in the legislature and Governor agreeing on suspending in-person voting, and selecting a mail-in ballot deadline of April 28, 2020.

Polling Aggregation
Source of poll aggregation	Date updated	Dates polled	Joe Biden	Bernie Sanders	Other/ Undecided
270 to Win	Mar 16, 2020	Mar 10–13, 2020	57.5%	35.0%	7.5%
RealClear Politics	Mar 16, 2020	Mar 10–13, 2020	57.5%	35.0%	7.5%
FiveThirtyEight	Mar 16, 2020	until Mar 13, 2020	58.7%	32.3%	9.0%
Average			57.9%	34.1%	8.0%

Tabulation of individual polls of the 2020 Ohio Democratic primary
Poll source	Date(s) administered	Sample size	Margin of error	Joe Biden	Michael Bloomberg	Cory Booker	Pete Buttigieg	Kamala Harris	Bernie Sanders	Elizabeth Warren	Andrew Yang	Other	Undecided
	Apr 8, 2020	Sanders suspends his campaign: Politico Story											
Swayable	Mar 16, 2020	2,027 (LV)	± 3.0%	66%	–	–	–	–	24%	–	–	10% (Note: Gabbard with 6%; "Other" with 4%)	–
Marist/NBC News	Mar 10–13, 2020	486 (LV)	± 5.6%	58%	–	–	–	–	35%	–	–	4% (Note: Gabbard with 2%; "Other" with 2%)	4%
Marist/NBC News	Mar 10–13, 2020	830 (RV)	± 4.1%	56%	–	–	–	–	36%	–	–	4% (Note: Gabbard with 2%; "Other" with 2%)	4%
Emerson College/Nexstar	Mar 11–12, 2020	464 (LV)	± 4.5%	57%	–	–	–	–	35%	–	–	1% (Note: Gabbard with 1%)	7%
ROI Rocket	Mar 6–12, 2020	880 (LV)	± 3.3%	61%	–	–	–	–	33%	–	–	–	–
	Mar 5, 2020	Warren withdraws from the race											
	Mar 4, 2020	Bloomberg withdraws from the race: NYT Story											
	Mar 2, 2020	Klobuchar withdraws from the race: NYT Story											
	Mar 1, 2020	Buttigieg withdraws from the race: NYT Story											
	Feb 29, 2020	South Carolina primary; Steyer withdraws from the race after close of polls											
	Feb 11, 2020	New Hampshire primary; Yang and Bennet withdraw from the race after close of polls											
	Feb 3, 2020	Iowa Caucuses											
Baldwin Wallace University/Oakland; University/Ohio Northern University	Jan 8–20, 2020	428 (RV)	–	32.1%	10.1%	–	6.1%	–	20.8%	10.7%	2.1%	5.7% (Note: Steyer with 2.2%; Klobuchar with 1.5%; Bennet with 0.8%; Gabbard with 0.5%; Delaney with 0.4%; Patrick with 0.3%)	9.8%
	Jan 13, 2020	Booker withdraws from the race											
	Jan 10, 2020	Williamson withdraws from the race											
	Jan 2, 2020	Castro withdraws from the race											
	Dec 3, 2019	Harris withdraws from the race											
	Nov 24, 2019	Bloomberg announces his candidacy											
	Nov 1, 2019	O'Rourke withdraws from the race											
	Oct 24, 2019	Ryan withdraws from the race											
Climate Nexus	Oct 1–7, 2019	443 (LV)	–	32%	–	3%	5%	6%	13%	21%	3%	17% (Note: Ryan with 2%; Castro, Delaney, O'Rourke, Steyer and Williamson with 1%; Bennet, Bullock, Gabbard, Klobuchar, Messam and Sestak with 0%; Other/Unsure with 10%)	– (Note: The poll did not provide separate information for this entry, so it is grouped under 'other'.)
Emerson	Sep 29 – Oct 2, 2019	353 (LV)	± 5.2%	29%	–	0%	5%	7%	27%	21%	3%	5% (Note: O'Rourke with 2%; Delaney, Gabbard, and Bullock with 1%; Ryan, Bennett, Klobuchar, Sestak, Steyer, Castro, and Messam with 0%)	2%
Quinnipiac	Jul 17–22, 2019	556	± 5.1%	31%	–	1%	6%	14%	14%	13%	1%	6% (Note: Castro, Gabbard, Klobuchar, O'Rourke, Ryan, and Steyer with 1%; Bennet, de Blasio, Bullock, Delaney, Gillibrand, Gravel, Hickenlooper, Inslee, Messam, Moulton, and Sestak with 0%)	11%
Zogby Analytics	May 23–29, 2019	222	± 6.6%	29%	–	3%	6%	5%	19%	12%	3%	6% (Note: O'Rourke with 2%; Delaney, Gabbard, Gillibrand, Hickenlooper, and Klobuchar with 1%; Castro and Inslee with 0%)	–

== Kansas primary ==
The Kansas Democratic primary is scheduled to take place on May 2, 2020.

Poll source	Date(s) administered	Sample size	Margin of error	Joe Biden	Tulsi Gabbard	Bernie Sanders	Other	Undecided
	Apr 8, 2020	Sanders suspends campaign						
	Mar 19, 2020	Gabbard withdraws from the race						
Public Policy Polling	Mar 10–11, 2020	550 (LV)	–	59%	3%	35%	–	4%

== Oregon primary ==
The Oregon Democratic primary is scheduled to take place on May 19, 2020.

Poll source	Date(s) administered	Sample size	Margin of error	Bernie Sanders	Joe Biden	Undecided	Beto O'Rourke	Kamala Harris	Elizabeth Warren	Cory Booker	Andrew Yang	Pete Buttigieg	Other
Zogby Analytics	Mar 18–19, 2019	238	± 6.4%	27%	26%	11%	8%	6%	6%	4%	4%	3%	7% (Note: Castro, Delaney, Gabbard, Gillibrand, Hickenlooper, Inslee, and McAuliffe with 1%)

== Delaware primary ==
The Delaware Democratic primary was scheduled to take place on April 28, 2020, but was delayed due to the COVID-19 pandemic, and will instead occur on June 2, 2020.

Poll source	Date(s) administered	Sample size	Margin of error	Joe Biden	Cory Booker	Pete Buttigieg	Tulsi Gabbard	Kamala Harris	Bernie Sanders	Elizabeth Warren	Andrew Yang	Other	Undecided
	Apr 8, 2020	Sanders suspends his campaign											
	Mar 19, 2020	Gabbard withdraws from the race											
	Mar 1–5, 2020	Buttigieg, Klobuchar, Bloomberg, and Warren withdraw from the race											
	Jan 13, 2020	Booker withdraws from the race											
	Dec 3, 2019	Harris withdraws from the race											
Data For Progress	Nov 15–25, 2019	481 (LV)	– (Note: Not reported by source)	35%	3%	8%	3%	1%	13%	11%	1%	10% (Note: Bloomberg, Delaney, Klobuchar and Williamson with 1%)	15%

== Indiana primary ==
The Indiana Democratic primary was scheduled to take place on May 5, 2020, but was delayed due to the COVID-19 pandemic, and will instead occur on June 2, 2020.

Poll source	Date(s) administered	Sample size	Margin of error	Joe Biden	Pete Buttigieg	Kamala Harris	Beto O'Rourke	Bernie Sanders	Elizabeth Warren	Other	Undecided
	Apr 8, 2020	Sanders suspends his campaign									
	Nov 1, 2019–March 5, 2020	O'Rourke, Harris, Buttigieg and Warren withdraw from the race									
We Ask America	Apr 29–May 5, 2019	280	± 5.9%	33%	20%	3%	2%	23%	2%	1% (Note: Booker with 1%; Klobuchar with <1%; others with <1%)	15%

== Maryland primary ==
The Maryland Democratic primary was scheduled to take place on April 28, 2020, but was delayed due to the COVID-19 pandemic, and will instead occur on June 2, 2020.

Poll source	Date(s) administered	Sample size	Margin of error	Joe Biden	Michael Bloomberg	Pete Buttigieg	Kamala Harris	Amy Klobuchar	Bernie Sanders	Elizabeth Warren	Other	Undecided
	Apr 8, 2020	Sanders suspends his campaign										
	Mar 1–5, 2020	Buttigieg, Klobuchar, Bloomberg, and Warren withdraw from the race										
Gonzales Research & Media Services	Feb 22–28, 2020	331 (LV)	± 5.5%	19%	15%	5%	–	4%	23%	8%	–	27%
Goucher College	Feb 13–19, 2020	371 (LV)	± 5.1%	18%	16%	7%	–	6%	24%	6%	4% (Note: Gabbard with <1%; Steyer with 0%; "Refused" with 4%)	18%
	Dec 3, 2019	Harris withdraws from the race										
Goucher College	Sept 13–19, 2019	300 (LV)	± 5.6%	33%	–	5%	6%	1%	10%	21%	9% (Note: Booker, Delaney, O'Rourke, and Yang with 1%; Castro, Gabbard, Other with <1%; Refused to answer with 5%)	15%

== Montana primary ==
The Montana Democratic primary is scheduled to take place on June 2, 2020. Polls with a sample size of <100 are marked in red to indicate a lack of reliability.

Poll source	Date(s) administered	Sample size	Margin of error	Joe Biden	Steve Bullock	Pete Buttigieg	Kamala Harris	Beto O'Rourke	Bernie Sanders	Elizabeth Warren	Andrew Yang	Other	Undecided
	Apr 8, 2020	Sanders suspends his campaign											
	Nov 1, 2019–March 5, 2020	O'Rourke, Bullock, Harris, Yang, Buttigieg and Warren withdraw from the race											
Montana State University Billings	Oct 7–16, 2019	40 (LV)	–	15%	5%	2%	2%	5%	2%	40%	No voters	2% (Note: Klobuchar with 2%)	25%

== New Mexico primary ==
The New Mexico democratic primary is scheduled to take place on June 2, 2020.

Poll source	Date(s) administered	Sample size	Margin of error	Joe Biden	Michael Bloomberg	Cory Booker	Pete Buttigieg	Tulsi Gabbard	Amy Klobuchar	Bernie Sanders	Elizabeth Warren	Andrew Yang	Other	Undecided
	Apr 8, 2020	Sanders suspends his campaign												
	Mar 1–19, 2020	Buttigieg, Klobuchar, Bloomberg, Warren, and Gabbard withdraw from the race												
	Jan 13–Feb 11, 2020	Booker and Yang withdraw from the race												
Emerson Polling	Jan 3–6, 2020	447 (RV)	± 4.6%	27%	3%	2%	7%	2%	2%	28%	8%	10%	11% (Note: Steyer with 1%; Bennet, Delaney, Patrick, and Williamson with 0%; someone else with 10%)	-

== Pennsylvania primary ==
The Pennsylvania Democratic primary was scheduled to take place on April 28, 2020, but was delayed due to the COVID-19 pandemic, and is instead scheduled for June 2, 2020.

Polling Aggregation
Source of poll aggregation	Date updated	Dates polled	Joe Biden	Bernie Sanders	Other/ Undecided
270 to Win	Mar 18, 2020	Feb 11–Mar 8, 2020	39.5%	28.0%	32.5%
RealClear Politics	Feb 23, 2020	Jan 20–Feb 20, 2020	39.5%	28.0%	32.5%
FiveThirtyEight	Mar 8, 2020	until Feb 20, 2020	54.4%	29.3%	16.3%
Average			44.5%	28.4%	27.1%

Poll source	Date(s) administered	Sample size	Margin of error	Joe Biden	Michael Bloomberg	Cory Booker	Pete Buttigieg	Kamala Harris	Beto O'Rourke	Bernie Sanders	Elizabeth Warren	Other	Undecided
	Apr 8, 2020	Sanders suspends his campaign											
YouGov/Yahoo News	Mar 6–8, 2020	–(RV)	± 5.1%	59%	–	–	–	–	–	31%	–	–	–
	Mar 1–5, 2020	Buttigieg, Klobuchar, Bloomberg and Warren withdraw from the race											
YouGov/University of Wisconsin-Madison	Feb 11–20, 2020	537 (LV)	–	20%	19%	–	12%	–	–	25%	9%	5% (Note: Klobuchar with 5%; "Others" not reported separately)	10% (Note: contains also "others")
	Feb 11, 2020	New Hampshire primary; Yang withdraws from the race after close of polls											
Franklin & Marshall College	Jan 20–26, 2020	292 (RV)	± 9.0%	22%	7%	–	6%	–	–	15%	14%	18% (Note: Yang and Klobuchar with 5%; "Other" with 2%; "None" with 6%)	19%
Baldwin Wallace University/Oakland; University/Ohio Northern University	Jan 8–20, 2020	502 (RV)	–	31.3%	9.1%	–	6.5%	–	–	20.5%	11.5%	8.8% (Note: Klobuchar and Yang with 2.5%; Bennet with 1.2%; Steyer with 1%; Gabbard with 0.9%; Delaney with 0.4%; Patrick with 0.3%)	11%
	Dec 3, 2019–Jan 13, 2020	Harris and Booker withdraw from the race											
	Nov 24, 2019	Bloomberg announces his candidacy											
	Nov 1, 2019	O'Rourke withdraws from the race											
Franklin & Marshall College	Oct 21–27, 2019	226 (RV)	± 8.9%	30%	–	1%	8%	1%	<1%	12%	18%	15% (Note: Bennet, Gabbard and Klobuchar with 2%; Yang with 1%; Bullock with <1%; none with 8%; other with 0%)	16%
Siena Research/New York Times	Oct 13–26, 2019	304	–	28%	–	0%	4%	1%	0%	14%	16%	3% (Note: Yang with 2%; Klobuchar with 1%; others with 0%)	30%
Kaiser Family Foundation	Sep 23–Oct 15, 2019	246 (LV)	–	27%	–	1%	3%	4%	No voters	14%	18%	5% (Note: Yang with 2%; Klobuchar and Steyer with 1%; Bennet, Bullock, Delaney, Gabbard, Messam, O'Rourke, Ryan, Sestak and Williamson with no voters; refused with 1%)	29%
Susquehanna Polling and Research Inc.	Sep 30–Oct 6, 2019	307 (RV)	± 5.6%	17%	–	0%	8%	1%	0%	6%	9%	7% (Note: Bennet with 2%; Klobuchar with 1%; Bullock, Castro, Delaney, Gabbard, Messam, Ryan, Sestak, Steyer, Williamson and Yang with 0%; someone else/none with 3%; refused to answer with 1%)	52%
Franklin & Marshall College	Jul 29–Aug 4, 2019	295	± 8.7%	28%	–	2%	6%	8%	1%	12%	21%	3% (Note: Bullock, Gabbard, and "Other" with 1%)	19%
Zogby Analytics	May 23–29, 2019	246	± 6.3%	46%	–	2%	9%	3%	2%	15%	8%	2% (Note: Castro, Gillibrand, and Yang with 1%; Delaney, Gabbard, Hickenlooper, Inslee, and Klobuchar with 0%)	–
Quinnipiac University	May 9–14, 2019	431	± 6.2%	39%	–	5%	6%	8%	2%	13%	8%	3% (Note: Klobuchar with 1%; Bennet, Castro, Delaney, Gabbard, Gillibrand, Hickenlooper, Inslee, Messam, Moulton, Ryan, Swalwell, Williamson, and Yang with <1%; others with 2%)	12%
	Apr 25, 2019	Biden announces his candidacy											
	Apr 14, 2019	Buttigieg announces his candidacy											
Muhlenberg College	Apr 3–10, 2019	405	± 5.5%	28%	–	3%	4%	8%	3%	16%	8%	9% (Note: Klobuchar with 3%; others with 6%)	20%
Emerson College	Mar 26–28, 2019	359	± 5.1%	39%	–	4%	6%	5%	5%	20%	11%	10% (Note: Gabbard with 3%; Gillibrand with 2%; Castro and Yang with 1%; Hickenlooper, Inslee, and Klobuchar with 0%; others with 4%)	–

== Georgia primary ==
The Georgia Democratic primary was originally scheduled to take place on March 24, 2020, but was delayed due to the COVID-19 pandemic, first to May 19, 2020, and then further delayed to June 9, 2020.

Polling aggregation
Source of poll aggregation	Date updated	Dates Polled	Joe Biden	Bernie Sanders	Undecided
FiveThirtyEight	Mar 14, 2020	until Feb 13, 2020	67.3%	30.1%	2.6%

Poll source	Date(s) administered	Sample size	Margin of error	Joe Biden	Michael Bloomberg	Pete Buttigieg	Kamala Harris	Bernie Sanders	Elizabeth Warren	Andrew Yang	Other	Undecided
	Apr 8, 2020	Sanders suspends his campaign										
The Progress Campaign (D)	Mar 12–21, 2020	913 (RV)	± 4.6%	63%	–	–	–	34%	–	–	–	2.3% (Note: Listed as "other/undecided")
University of Georgia	Mar 4–14, 2020	807	± 3.4%	66%	–	–	–	22%	–	–	1% (Note: Gabbard with 1%)	11%
	Mar 5, 2020	Warren withdraws from the race										
	Mar 4, 2020	Bloomberg withdraws from the race										
	Mar 1, 2020	Buttigieg withdraws from the race										
Landmark Communications	Feb 12, 2020	500	± 4.3%	32%	14%	5%	–	14%	4%	–	6% (Note: Klobuchar with 3%; Steyer with 2%; Gabbard with 1%)	26%
	Feb 11, 2020	Yang withdraws from the race										
	Dec 3, 2019	Harris withdraws from the race										
SurveyUSA	Nov 15–18, 2019	536	± 5.2%	36%	6%	7%	6%	17%	14%	–	5%	9%
Climate Nexus	Nov 4–10, 2019	457	± 3.6%	31%	–	4%	4%	14%	14%	2%	11% (Note: Booker and Williamson with 2%; Bennet, Bullock, Castro, Delaney, Gabbard, Klobuchar, and Steyer with 1%; Sestak with 0%)	19%
Landmark Communications	Sep 18–21, 2019	500	± 4.1%	41%	–	5%	6%	8%	17%	2%	6% (Note: Booker with 2%; Gabbard, Klobuchar, O'Rourke, and Williamson with 1%; Bennet, Castro, and Steyer with 0%)	15%
Change Research	Sep 7–11, 2019	755	± 3.6%	33%	–	7%	7%	17%	22%	3%	10% (Note: O'Rourke with 3%; Booker, Gabbard, and Williamson with 2%; Castro and Klobuchar with 1%; Bennet, Bullock, Delaney, Messam, and Steyer with 0%)	–
SurveyMonkey	Jul 2–16, 2019	402	± 6.4%	31%	–	5%	15%	12%	13%	4%	11% (Note: Castro with 3%; Booker, Bullock, and Klobuchar with 2%; O'Rourke and Ryan with 1%; Bennet, de Blasio, Delaney, Gabbard, Gillibrand, Gravel, Hickenlooper, Messam, Moulton, Sestak, and Williamson with 0%)	9%

== New York primary ==
The New York Democratic primary was scheduled to take place on April 28, 2020, but was delayed due to the COVID-19 pandemic, and is instead scheduled for June 23, 2020.

Polling aggregation
Source of poll aggregation	Date updated	Dates polled	Joe Biden	Bernie Sanders	Other/ Undecided
FiveThirtyEight	Mar 18, 2020	until Mar 18, 2020	51.7%	28.9%	21.4%

Poll source	Date(s) administered	Sample size	Margin of error	Joe Biden	Michael Bloomberg	Pete Buttigieg	Kamala Harris	Amy Klobuchar	Bernie Sanders	Elizabeth Warren	Other	Un- decided
	Apr 8, 2020	Sanders suspends his campaign										
	Mar 19, 2020	Gabbard withdraws from the race										
	Mar 1–5, 2020	Buttigieg, Klobuchar, Bloomberg, and Warren withdraw from the race										
Siena College Research Institute	Feb 16–20, 2020	315 (RV)	–	13%	21%	9%	–	9%	25%	11%	1% (Note: Gabbard with 1%; Steyer with 0%)	11%
	Feb 3, 2020	Iowa caucus is held										
Civis Analytics/Data For Progress	Jan 13–19, 2020	845 (LV)	–	30%	17%	7%	–	2%	17%	14%	15% (Note: Steyer and Yang with 4%; Bennet with 2%; Delaney, Gabbard, and Patrick with 1%)	–
	Dec 3, 2019	Harris withdraws from the race										
Siena College	Nov 12–18, 2019	797 (RV)	± 4.0%	24%	–	5%	3%	1%	13%	14%	12% (Note: Booker and Yang with 2%; Bennet, Castro, and Gabbard with 1%; Bullock, Delaney, Messam, Patrick, Sestak, Steyer and Williamson with 0%; others with 4%)	29% (Note: also includes "refused")
Siena College	Oct 6–10, 2019	340 (RV)	± 6.5%	21%	–	4%	4%	1%	16%	21%	10% (Note: Yang with 3%; Booker, and O'Rourke with 1%; de Blasio and Gabbard with <1%; other with 4%)	24% (Note: also includes "refused")
	Sep 20, 2019	de Blasio withdraws from the race										
Siena College*	Sep 8–12, 2019	359 (RV)	± 6.1%	22%	–	3%	4%	1%	15%	17%	4% (Note: Gabbard and Yang with 1%; Booker, de Blasio, Castro and O'Rourke with less than 1%; "Other" with 1%)	34%
	Aug 28, 2019	Gillibrand withdraws from the race										

=== Head-to-head polls ===
Poll source	Date(s) administered	Sample size	Margin of error	Bill de Blasio	Kirsten Gillibrand	Other	Undecided
Siena College	Jun 2–6, 2019	385	–	25%	56%	11%	8%

== New Jersey primary ==
The New Jersey Democratic primary was scheduled to take place on June 2, 2020, but was delayed due to the COVID-19 pandemic, and is instead scheduled for July 7, 2020.

Polling aggregation
Source of poll aggregation	Date updated	Dates polled	Joe Biden	Bernie Sanders	Undecided
FiveThirtyEight	Mar 8, 2020	until Feb 18, 2020	35.5%	30.5%	34.0%

Poll source	Date(s) administered	Sample size	Margin of error	Joe Biden	Michael Bloomberg	Cory Booker	Pete Buttigieg	Kamala Harris	Beto O'Rourke	Bernie Sanders	Elizabeth Warren	Other	Undecided
	Mar 5, 2020	Warren withdraws from the race											
	Mar 4, 2020	Bloomberg withdraws from the race											
	Mar 3, 2020	Super Tuesday											
	Mar 2, 2020	Klobuchar withdraws from the race											
	Mar 1, 2020	Buttigieg withdraws from the race											
	Feb 29, 2020	South Carolina primary; Steyer withdraws from the race after close of polls											
	Feb 22, 2020	Nevada caucuses											
FDU	Feb 12–16, 2020	357 (RV)	–	16%	23%	–	10%	–	–	25%	8%	7% (Note: Klobuchar with 3%, Steyer with 2%, Gabbard with 0%, someone else at 1%)	11%
	Feb 11, 2020	New Hampshire primary; Yang withdraws from the race											
	Feb 3, 2020	Iowa caucuses											
Emerson College	Jan 16–19, 2020	388	± 4.9%	28%	9%	–	6%	–	–	25%	15%	16% (Note: Yang with 6%, Klobuchar with 3%, Gabbard with 3%, Delaney with 2%, someone else at 2%)	–
	Jan 13, 2020	Booker withdraws from the race											
	Dec 3, 2019	Harris withdraws from the race											
	Nov 24, 2019	Bloomberg announces his candidacy											
Monmouth University	Sep 12–16, 2019	713	± 3.7%	26%	–	9%	6%	6%	0%	18%	20%	7% (Note: Gabbard with 2%; de Blasio, Klobuchar and Yang with 1%; Bennet, Bullock, Castro, O’Rourke, Ryan, Steyer and Williamson with <1%)	8%
Change Research	Aug 16–20, 2019	1176	± 2.9%	26%	–	5%	12%	8%	2%	21%	23%	3% (Note: Gabbard, Steyer, and Yang with 1%)	–

== Connecticut primary ==
The Connecticut Democratic primary was scheduled to take place on April 28, 2020, but was delayed due to the COVID-19 pandemic, first to June 2, 2020, and then further delayed to August 11, 2020.

Poll source	Date(s) administered	Sample size	Margin of error	Joe Biden	Bernie Sanders	Pete Buttigieg	Elizabeth Warren	Other	Undecided
	Apr 8, 2020	Sanders suspends his campaign							
GreatBlue Research/Sacred Heart University/Hartford Courant	Mar 24–Apr 3, 2020	– (RV) (Note: Not specified in release.)	–	52.0%	32.5%	–	–	1.4% (Note: Other with 1.4%)	14.1%
GreatBlue Research/Sacred Heart University/Hartford Courant	Feb 24–Mar 12, 2020	383 (RV)	–	42.1%	24.5%	–	–	19.5% (Note: Other with 19.5%)	13.8%
	Mar 5, 2020	Warren withdraws from the race							
	Mar 1, 2020	Buttigieg withdraws from the race							
GreatBlue Research/Sacred Heart University/Hartford Courant	Dec 16, 2019–Jan 2, 2020	348 (RV)	–	33.0%	19.3%	11.2%	17.8%	3.4% (Note: Other with 3.4%)	15.2%

== Notes ==
Partisan clients

Additional candidates

== See also ==
- Nationwide opinion polling for the 2020 Democratic Party presidential primaries
- 2020 Democratic National Convention
- Opinion polling for the 2020 Republican Party presidential primaries
- Nationwide opinion polling for the 2020 United States presidential election
- Statewide opinion polling for the 2020 United States presidential election
