= Nationwide opinion polling for the 2020 United States presidential election =

This is a list of nationwide public opinion polls that were conducted relating to the general election for the 2020 United States presidential election. If multiple versions of polls are provided, the version among likely voters (LV) is prioritized, then registered voters (RV), then adults (A). Polling in the 2020 election was considerably less accurate than in the 2016 election, and possibly more inaccurate than in any election since 1996.

== Polling aggregation ==
=== Two-way ===
The following graph depicts the standing of each candidate in the poll aggregators from September 2019 to November 2020. Former Vice President Joe Biden, the Democratic nominee, had an average polling lead of 7.9 percentage points over incumbent President Donald Trump, the Republican nominee. Biden would win the national popular vote by 4.4 percentage points.

Polling aggregates
Active candidates
Joe Biden (Democratic)
Donald Trump (Republican)
Others/Undecided

Donald Trump vs. Joe Biden
Source of poll aggregation	Dates administered	Dates updated	Joe Biden	Donald Trump	Other/Undecided (Note: Calculated by taking the difference of 100% and all other candidates combined.)	Margin
270 to Win	Oct 28 – Nov 2, 2020	Nov 2, 2020	51.1%	43.1%	5.8%	Biden +8.0
RealClear Politics	Oct 25 – Nov 2, 2020	Nov 2, 2020	51.2%	44.0%	4.8%	Biden +7.2
FiveThirtyEight	until Nov 2, 2020	Nov 2, 2020	51.8%	43.4%	4.8%	Biden +8.4
Average			51.4%	43.5%	5.1%	Biden +7.9
2020 results			51.3%	46.8%	1.9%	Biden +4.5

=== Four-way ===
Calculated averages are not comparable to those for the Biden vs. Trump polls. As polling with third parties was very limited, the polls included in the average are often different.

Donald Trump vs. Joe Biden vs. Jo Jorgensen vs. Howie Hawkins
Source of poll aggregation	Dates administered	Dates updated	Joe Biden	Donald Trump	Jo Jorgensen	Howie Hawkins	Other/ Undecided	Margin
270 to Win	Oct 23 – Nov 2, 2020	Nov 2, 2020	50.6%	43.2%	1.2%	1.0%	4.0%	Biden +7.4
RealClear Politics	Oct 15 – Nov 2, 2020	Nov 2, 2020	50.6%	43.2%	1.8%	0.8%	3.6%	Biden +7.4
2020 results			51.3%	46.8%	1.1%	0.2%	0.6%	Biden +4.5

== National poll results ==
=== October 1 – November 3, 2020 ===
Poll source	Date	Sample size (Note: Key: A – all adults RV – registered voters LV – likely voters V – unclear)	Margin of error	Donald Trump Republican	Joe Biden Democratic	Jo Jorgensen Libertarian	Howie Hawkins Green	Other	Abstention	Undecided	Lead
2020 presidential election	Nov 3, 2020	–	–	46.8%	51.3%	1.1%	0.2%	0.6%	–	–	4.5%
Ipsos/Reuters	Oct 31 – Nov 2	914 (LV)	± 3.7%	45%	52%	–	–	3% (Note: "Some other candidate" with 3%)	–	–	7%
YouGov/Economist	Oct 31 – Nov 2	1,363 (LV)	–	43%	53%	–	–	2%	0%	2%	10%
Research Co.	Oct 31 – Nov 2	1,025 (LV)	± 3.0%	42%	50%	1%	1%	1%	–	5%	8%
IBD/TIPP	Oct 29 – Nov 2	1,212 (LV)	± 3.2%	46% (Note: Standard VI response) (Note: Overlapping sample with the previous IBD/TIPP poll, but more information available regarding sample size)	50%	2%	1%	1%	–	–	4%
IBD/TIPP	Oct 29 – Nov 2	1,212 (LV)	± 3.2%	46% (Note: If only Biden and Trump were candidates)	51%	–	–	–	–	–	5%
USC Dornsife	Oct 20 – Nov 2	5,423 (LV)	–	42%	54%	– (Note: Not yet released)	–	–	–	–	12%
USC Dornsife	Oct 20 – Nov 2	5,423 (LV)	–	43% (Note: With the only options as Biden, Trump and "someone else" and additional weighting based on respondents' estimated chances of voting)	54%	–	–	–	–	–	11%
Swayable	Nov 1	5,174 (LV)	± 1.7%	46%	52%	2%	0%	–	–	–	6%
John Zogby Strategies/EMI Research	Nov 1	1,008 (LV)	± 3.2%	43%	48%	4%	2%	2%	–	2%	5%
John Zogby Strategies/EMI Research	Nov 1	1,008 (LV)	± 3.2%	45%	52%	–	–	–	–	3%	7%
Redfield & Wilton Strategies	Oct 30 – Nov 1	8,765 (LV)	–	41%	53%	1%	1%	–	–	–	12%
SurveyMonkey/Axios	Oct 30 – Nov 1	24,930 (LV)	± 1%	47% (Note: Overlapping sample with the previous SurveyMonkey/Axios poll, but more information available regarding sample size)	52%	–	–	–	–	–	5%
YouGov/Yahoo News	Oct 30 – Nov 1	1,360 (LV)	–	43%	53%	–	–	2%	0%	2%	10%
Change Research/CNBC	Oct 29 – Nov 1	1,880 (LV)	± 2.26%	42%	52%	2%	1%	2% (Note: "Refused" with 2%)	–	1%	10%
Qriously/Brandwatch	Oct 29 – Nov 1	3,505 (LV)	–	41%	52%	2%	1%	–	–	–	11%
Léger	Oct 29 – Nov 1	827 (LV)	± 3.1%	42%	50%	2%	1%	1% (Note: West (B) with 1%)	0%	4%	8%
Quinnipiac University	Oct 28 – Nov 1	1,516 (LV)	± 2.5%	39%	50%	–	–	2% (Note: "Someone else" with 2%)	–	9%	11%
Pulse Opinion Research/Rasmussen Reports	Oct 28 – Nov 1	1,500 (LV)	± 2.5%	47% (Note: Overlapping sample with the previous Pulse Opinion Research/Rasmussen Reports poll, but more information available regarding sample size)	48%	–	–	3%	–	2%	1%
AYTM/Aspiration	Oct 30–31	700 (LV)	± 3.7%	39%	48%	–	–	–	–	–	9%
SurveyMonkey/Axios	Oct 29–31	34,255 (LV)	–	46%	52%	–	–	–	–	–	6%
Morning Consult	Oct 29–31	14,663 (LV)	± 1%	44% (Note: Overlapping sample with the previous Morning Consult poll, but more information available regarding sample size)	52%	–	–	2%	–	3%	8%
Swayable	Oct 29–31	3,115 (LV)	± 2.4%	46%	52%	2%	0%	–	–	–	6%
RMG Research/Just the News	Oct 29–31	1,200 (LV)	± 2.8%	44%	51%	1%	1%	2% (Note: "Some other candidate" with 2%)	–	1%	7%
RMG Research/Just the News	Oct 29–31	1,200 (LV)	± 2.8%	42% (Note: Results generated with high Democratic turnout model)	53%	1%	1%	2%	–	1%	11%
RMG Research/Just the News	Oct 29–31	1,200 (LV)	± 2.8%	45% (Note: Results generated with high Republican turnout model)	50%	1%	1%	2%	–	1%	5%
SurveyUSA/Cheddar	Oct 29–31	1,265 (LV)	± 3.2%	44%	52%	–	–	3%	–	2%	8%
NBC/WSJ	Oct 29–31	833 (RV)	± 3.4%	42%	52%	-	-	3% (Note: "Neither/other" with 3%)	–	3%	10%
IBD/TIPP	Oct 27–31	1,072 (LV)	± 3.2%	45%	49%	3%	1%	0%	–	0%	4%
IBD/TIPP	Oct 27–31	1,072 (LV)	± 3.2%	45%	50%	–	–	–	–	–	5%
Data for Progress	Oct 28–29	1,403 (LV)	± 2.6%	44%	54%	1%	1%	–	–	–	10%
Gravis Marketing	Oct 27–29	1,281 (LV)	± 2.7%	44%	50%	–	–	–	–	6%	6%
Morning Consult	Oct 27–29	12,000 (LV)	± 1%	43%	52%	–	–	2%	–	3%	9%
Fox News	Oct 27–29	1,246 (LV)	± 2.5%	44%	52%	–	–	2%	0% (Note: No voters)	2%	8%
Opinium/The Guardian	Oct 26–29	1,451 (LV)	–	41%	55%	–	–	2%	–	2%	14%
Swayable	Oct 27–28	2,386 (LV)	± 2.9%	46%	53%	1%	1%	–	–	–	7%
Harvard-Harris	Oct 27–28	2,093 (RV)	–	46%	54%	–	–	–	–	–	8%
AtlasIntel	Oct 26–28	1,726 (LV)	± 2%	46%	51%	–	–	1%	1%	1%	5%
Pulse Opinion Research/Rasmussen Reports	Oct 26–28	1,500 (LV)	± 2.5%	47%	48%	–	–	3%	–	2%	1%
SurveyMonkey/Axios	Oct 26–28	15,688 (LV)	–	47%	51%	–	–	–	–	–	4%
JL Partners/The Independent	Oct 26–28	844 (LV)	–	41%	55%	–	–	–	–	–	14%
HarrisX/The Hill	Oct 25–28	2,359 (LV)	± 2%	45%	49%	–	–	3%	3%	3%	4%
HarrisX/The Hill	Oct 25–28	2,359 (LV)	± 2%	47%	53%	–	–	–	–	–	6%
Angus Reid Global	Oct 23–28	2,231 (LV)	± 2.1%	45%	53%	–	–	2% (Note: "Another candidate" with 2%)	–	–	8%
SurveyMonkey/Long Island University	Oct 26–27	1,573 (A)	± 3.5%	36%	47%	–	–	5%	–	9%	11%
YouGov/Economist	Oct 25–27	1,365 (LV)	–	43%	54%	–	–	2%	0%	2%	11%
GMR/FPU/Boston Herald Archived	Oct 23–27	1,006 (LV)	± 3%	39%	53%	–	–	6% (Note: "Other" and "Refused" with 3%)	–	4%	14%
Ipsos/Reuters	Oct 23–27	825 (LV)	± 3.9%	42%	52%	–	–	5% (Note: "Some other candidate" with 5%)	0%	2%	10%
Suffolk University/USA Today	Oct 23–27	1,000 (LV)	± 3.1%	43%	50%	1%	1%	2% (Note: "Refused" with 2%; "Someone else" with no voters)	0% (Note: Would not vote with no voters)	4%	7%
Suffolk University/USA Today	Oct 23–27	1,000 (LV)	± 3.1%	44%	52%	–	–	2%	–	2%	8%
YouGov/UMass Amherst	Oct 20–27	1,500 (LV)	± 3.1%	44%	53%	–	–	3%	0% (Note: Would not vote with 0%)	1%	9%
Redfield & Wilton Strategies	Oct 25–26	4,790 (LV)	–	41%	51%	1%	1%	1% (Note: "Another Third Party/Write-in" with 1%)	–	5%	10%
Emerson College	Oct 25–26	1,121 (LV)	± 2.8%	47% (Note: With voters who lean towards a given candidate)	51%	–	–	2%	–	–	4%
Morning Consult	Oct 24–26	12,000 (LV)	± 1%	43%	52%	–	–	2%	–	3%	9%
Swayable	Oct 23–26	11,714 (RV)	± 1.2%	46%	51%	2%	1%	–	–	–	5%
Winston Group (R)	Oct 23–26	1,000 (RV)	–	43%	48%	–	–	–	–	9%	5%
CNN/SSRS	Oct 23–26	886 (LV)	± 3.8%	42%	54%	–	–	1%	1%	2%	12%
Qriously/Brandwatch	Oct 22–26	2,234 (LV)	± 2.8%	39%	49%	3%	1%	–	4%	4%	10%
IBD/TIPP	Oct 22–26	970 (LV)	± 3.2%	46%	51%	1%	1%	0%	–	0%	5%
IBD/TIPP	Oct 22–26	970 (LV)	± 3.2%	46%	50%	–	–	–	–	–	4%
YouGov/Hofstra University	Oct 19–26	2,000 (LV)	± 2%	43%	54%	–	–	4% (Note: "Someone else" with 4%)	–	–	11%
YouGov/GW Politics	Oct 16–26	2,500 (LV)	± 2%	41%	52%	–	–	2%	1% (Note: Includes did not vote)	4%	11%
Cometrends/University of Dallas	Oct 13–26	2,500 (A)	± 2%	44%	56%	–	–	–	–	–	12%
Lucid/Tufts University	Oct 25	837 (LV)	–	45%	52%	–	–	–	–	–	7%
Léger	Oct 23–25	834 (LV)	± 3.1%	41%	49%	4%	1%	1%	–	5%	8%
SurveyMonkey/Axios	Oct 23–25	19,543 (LV)	–	46%	52%	–	–	–	–	–	6%
YouGov/Yahoo News	Oct 23–25	1,350 (LV)	–	42%	54%	–	–	2%	0%	2%	12%
Pulse Opinion Research/Rasmussen Reports	Oct 21–22, Oct 25	1,500 (LV)	± 2.5%	48%	47%	–	–	3%	–	2%	1%
Change Research/Crooked Media	Oct 23–24	1,125 (LV)	± 3%	43%	51%	1%	1%	1% (Note: "Don't recall" with 1%)	0% (Note: Did/would not vote with 0%)	2%	9%
RMG Research/Just the News	Oct 23–24	1,842 (LV)	± 2.8%	44%	51%	1%	0%	1%	–	2%	7%
RMG Research/Just the News	Oct 23–24	1,842 (LV)	± 2.8%	43%	53%	1%	0%	1%	–	2%	10%
RMG Research/Just the News	Oct 23–24	1,842 (LV)	± 2.8%	46%	50%	1%	0%	1%	–	2%	4%
CNBC/Hart Research/Public Opinion Strategies	Oct 21–24	800 (RV)	± 3.5%	40%	51%	–	–	–	–	–	11%
Morning Consult	Oct 21–23	12,000 (LV)	± 1%	43%	52%	–	–	2%	–	3%	9%
Spry Strategies	Oct 20–23	3,500 (LV)	± 3.1%	48%	46%	–	–	2%	–	4%	2%
Spry Strategies/Women's Liberation Front	Oct 20–23	3,500 (LV)	± 3.1%	46%	48%	–	–	2%	–	4%	2%
SurveyMonkey/Axios	Oct 20–22	34,788 (LV)	–	46%	52%	–	–	–	–	–	6%
Ipsos/Reuters	Oct 20–22	935 (LV)	–	43%	51%	–	–	4%	–	2%	8%
IBD/TIPP	Oct 17–21	965 (LV)	± 3.2%	45%	50%	3%	1%	0%	–	1%	5%
IBD/TIPP	Oct 17–21	965 (LV)	± 3.2%	46%	50%	–	–	–	–	–	4%
Rethink Priorities	Oct 20	4,933 (LV)	± 2%	42%	51%	–	–	4% (Note: "Another candidate" with 4%)	–	4%	9%
Data for Progress	Oct 20	811 (LV)	–	44%	54%	–	–	2% (Note: "A different candidate" with 2%)	–	–	10%
YouGov/Economist	Oct 18–20	1,344 (LV)	–	43%	52%	–	–	2%	0%	4%	9%
Morning Consult	Oct 18–20	15,821 (LV)	± 1%	43%	52%	–	–	2%	–	3%	9%
Echelon Insights	Oct 16–20	1,006 (LV)	–	44%	50%	1%	1%	0% (Note: West (B) with 0%)	–	3%	6%
Echelon Insights	Oct 16–20	1,006 (LV)	–	44%	51%	–	–	–	–	5%	7%
Ipsos/Reuters	Oct 16–20	949 (LV)	± 3.6%	42%	51%	–	–	4% (Note: "Some other candidate" with 4%)	–	3%	9%
Pulse Opinion Research/Rasmussen Reports	Oct 14–15, Oct 18–20	2,500 (LV)	± 2%	46%	49%	–	–	2%	–	2%	3%
SurveyMonkey/Axios	Oct 17–19	18,255 (LV)	–	46%	52%	–	–	–	–	–	6%
SurveyUSA/Cheddar	Oct 16–19	1,136 (LV)	± 3.2%	43%	53%	–	–	2%	–	3%	10%
Quinnipiac University	Oct 16–19	1,426 (LV)	± 2.6%	41%	51%	–	–	2%	–	4%	10%
GSG/GBAO	Oct 15–19	1,000 (RV)	± 3.1%	43%	53%	–	–	–	1%	3%	10%
Qriously/Brandwatch	Oct 15–19	2,731 (LV)	± 2.6%	40%	51%	1%	0%	–	3%	5%	11%
GBAO/Omidyar Network	Oct 15–19	1,150 (RV)	–	40%	53%	–	–	3% (Note: "Someone else" with 2%; "Refused" with 1%)	1%	4%	13%
USC Dornsife	Oct 6–19	5,488 (LV)	–	41%	54%	–	–	–	–	–	13%
USC Dornsife	Oct 6–19	5,488 (LV)	–	42%	54%	–	–	–	–	–	12%
Change Research/CNBC	Oct 17–18	2,711 (LV)	± 1.9%	42%	52%	–	–	–	–	–	10%
Redfield & Wilton Strategies	Oct 17–18	2,915 (LV)	–	40%	51%	1%	1%	1%	–	6%	11%
Research Co.	Oct 16–18	1,035 (LV)	± 3.0%	42%	50%	1%	1%	7% (Note: "Some other candidate" with 1%; "Undecided"/would not vote with 6%)	–	–	8%
Léger	Oct 16–18	821 (LV)	± 3.1%	41%	50%	2%	2%	1%	0%	5%	9%
YouGov/Yahoo News	Oct 16–18	1,583 (LV)	± 4%	40%	51%	–	–	3%	0%	5%	11%
Siena College/NYT Upshot	Oct 15–18	987 (LV)	± 3.4%	41%	50%	2%	0%	1%	0%	6% (Note: Includes "Refused")	9%
Morning Consult	Oct 15–17	12,000 (LV)	± 1%	43%	52%	–	–	2%	–	3%	9%
RMG Research/Just the News	Oct 15–17	1,265 (LV)	± 2.8%	43%	51%	2%	1%	1% (Note: "Some other candidate" with 1%)	–	2%	8%
SurveyMonkey/Axios	Oct 14–16	38,710 (LV)	–	45%	53%	–	–	–	–	–	8%
IBD/TIPP	Oct 12–16	1,009 (LV)	± 3.2%	43%	50%	2%	1%	1%	–	1%	7%
IBD/TIPP	Oct 12–16	1,009 (LV)	± 3.2%	43%	50%	–	–	–	–	–	7%
HarrisX/The Hill	Oct 13–15	1,897 (RV)	± 2.25%	42%	46%	–	–	3%	3%	6%	4%
Ipsos/Reuters	Oct 13–15	920 (LV)	–	41%	51%	–	–	4%	0%	4%	10%
Morning Consult	Oct 12–14	15,499 (LV)	± 1%	43%	52%	–	–	2%	–	4%	9%
JL Partners/The Independent	Oct 13	844 (LV)	–	42%	52%	–	–	–	–	–	10%
SurveyMonkey/Axios	Oct 11–13	10,395 (LV)	–	46%	52%	–	–	–	–	–	6%
YouGov/Economist	Oct 11–13	1,333 (LV)	–	42%	52%	–	–	1%	0%	4%	10%
HarrisX/The Hill	Oct 10–13	2,855 (RV)	± 1.83%	40%	47%	–	–	3%	3%	7%	7%
Ipsos/Reuters	Oct 9–13	882 (LV)	± 3.8%	41%	51%	–	–	4%	–	4%	10%
Marist College/NPR/PBS	Oct 8–13	896 (LV)	± 3.8%	43%	54%	–	–	1%	–	2%	11%
Whitman Insight Strategies	Oct 8–13	1,103 (LV)	± 2.9%	42%	54%	–	–	1% (Note: "Someone else" with 1%)	–	3%	12%
Pulse Opinion Research/Rasmussen Reports	Oct 7–8, Oct 11–13	2,500 (LV)	± 2%	45%	50%	–	–	2%	–	3%	5%
Public Religion Research Institute	Oct 9–12	752 (LV) (Note: Likely voter model assuming 70% turnout)	–	38%	56%	–	–	–	–	–	18%
Public Religion Research Institute	Oct 9–12	591 (LV) (Note: Likely voter model assuming 55% turnout)	–	40%	54%	–	–	–	–	–	14%
NBC/WSJ	Oct 9–12	1,000 (RV)	± 3.1%	42%	53%	–	–	3%	–	2%	11%
AP-NORC	Oct 8–12	1,121 (A)	± 4%	36%	51%	–	–	7% (Note: "Another candidate" with 6%; "Refused" with 1%)	6%	0%	15%
GSG/GBAO	Oct 8–12	1,003 (RV)	± 3.1%	43%	53%	–	–	–	1%	3%	10%
Qriously/Brandwatch	Oct 8–12	2,053 (LV)	± 2.8%	38%	52%	1%	1%	–	3%	6%	14%
Opinium/The Guardian	Oct 8–12	1,398 (LV)	–	40%	57%	–	–	1%	–	2%	17%
Kaiser Family Foundation	Oct 7–12	1,015 (LV)	± 3%	38%	49%	–	–	5% (Note: "Someone else" with 5%)	–	8%	11%
Public First	Oct 6–12	2,004 (A)	–	34%	47%	–	–	3% (Note: "Another candidate" with 3%)	8%	8%	13%
YouGov/UMass Lowell	Oct 5–12	819 (LV)	± 4.3%	43%	53%	1%	1%	0% (Note: "Another candidate" with 0%)	–	3%	10%
Morning Consult	Oct 9–11	16,056 (LV)	± 1%	43%	51%	–	–	2%	–	4%	8%
YouGov/Yahoo News	Oct 9–11	1,366 (LV)	–	43%	51%	–	–	2%	0%	4%	8%
Léger	Oct 9–11	841 (LV)	± 3.1%	39%	50%	3%	1%	1%	1%	6%	11%
IBD/TIPP	Oct 7–11	851 (LV)	± 3.5%	43%	52%	2%	1%	0%	–	0%	9%
IBD/TIPP	Oct 7–11	851 (LV)	± 3.5%	42%	53%	–	–	–	–	–	11%
Redfield & Wilton Strategies	Oct 10	1,679 (LV)	–	41%	49%	1%	1%	1%	–	7%	8%
SurveyMonkey/Axios	Oct 8–10	25,748 (LV)	–	46%	52%	–	–	–	–	–	6%
RMG Research/Just the News	Oct 8–10	1,240 (LV)	± 2.8%	43%	51%	2%	1%	0%	–	2%	8%
RMG Research/Just the News	Oct 8–10	1,240 (LV)	± 2.8%	41%	53%	2%	1%	0%	–	2%	12%
RMG Research/Just the News	Oct 8–10	1,240 (LV)	± 2.8%	45%	50%	2%	1%	0%	–	2%	5%
Morning Consult	Oct 7–9	12,000 (LV)	± 1%	43%	51%	–	–	2%	–	4%	8%
YouGov/CCES	Sep 29 – Oct 7	50,908 (LV)	–	43%	51%	–	–	–	–	–	8%
ABC/Washington Post	Oct 6–9	752 (LV)	± 4%	42%	54%	2%	1%	0% (Note: "None of these" with 0%; "Other" with no voters)	0%	2%	12%
ABC/Washington Post	Oct 6–9	752 (LV)	± 4%	43%	55%	–	–	0% (Note: "Other" with no voters; "neither" with 0%)	1%	1%	12%
Ipsos/Reuters	Oct 6–8	882 (LV)	–	41%	53%	–	–	2%	0%	3%	12%
Public Opinion Strategies/Conservative Energy Network (Note: The Conservative Energy Network primarily supports Republican candidates)	Oct 5–8	1,000 (LV)	–	41%	55%	–	–	–	–	4%	14%
Edison Research	Sep 25 – Oct 8	1,378 (RV) (Note: Additional data sourced from FiveThirtyEight)	–	35%	48%	–	–	–	–	–	13%
Ipsos/Reuters	Sep 22 – Oct 8	2,004 (A)	± 3.5%	39%	46%	–	–	5%	5%	5%	7%
SurveyMonkey/Axios	Oct 5–7	30,687 (LV)	–	45%	53%	–	–	–	–	–	8%
Data For Progress	Oct 6	863 (LV)	–	41%	56%	–	–	3% (Note: "A different candidate" with 3%)	–	–	15%
Morning Consult	Oct 4–6	12,000 (LV)	± 1%	43%	51%	–	–	2%	–	4%	8%
YouGov/Economist	Oct 4–6	1,364 (LV)	–	42%	51%	–	–	2%	0%	5%	9%
HarrisX/The Hill	Oct 3–6	2,841 (RV)	± 1.84%	40%	45%	–	–	3%	4%	7%	5%
Fox News	Oct 3–6	1,012 (LV)	± 3%	43%	53%	–	–	1%	–	3%	10%
Ipsos/Reuters	Oct 2–6	882 (LV)	± 3.8%	40%	52%	1%	1%	3% (Note: "Some other candidate" with 3%; West (B) with 0%)	–	3%	12%
Ipsos/Reuters	Oct 2–6	882 (LV)	± 3.8%	40% (Note: With only Biden, Trump and "Some other candidate" available)	52%	–	–	4%	–	4%	12%
Pulse Opinion Research/Rasmussen Reports	Sep 30 – Oct 1, Oct 4–6	2,500 (LV)	± 2%	40%	52%	–	–	4%	–	4%	12%
Innovative Research Group	Sep 29 – Oct 6	2,435 (RV)	–	42%	47%	–	–	1%	2%	9%	5%
GSG/GBAO	Oct 2–5	1,011 (RV)	± 3.1%	44%	52%	–	–	–	1%	4%	8%
Pew Research	Sep 30 – Oct 5	11,929 (RV)	± 1.5%	42%	52%	4%	1%	1% (Note: "None/other" with 1%)	–	0%	10%
USC Dornsife	Sep 22 – Oct 5	4,914 (LV)	–	42%	54%	–	–	–	–	–	12%
USC Dornsife	Sep 22 – Oct 5	4,914 (LV)	–	42%	53%	–	–	–	–	–	11%
Redfield & Wilton Strategies	Oct 3–4	2,127 (LV)	–	42%	50%	1%	1%	1%	–	6%	8%
Léger	Oct 2–4	843 (LV)	± 3.1%	40%	49%	2%	1%	1%	1%	6%	9%
SurveyMonkey/Axios	Oct 2–4	12,510 (LV)	–	46%	52%	–	–	–	–	–	6%
Change Research/CNBC	Oct 2–4	2,167 (LV)	± 2.11%	42%	52%	3%	1%	–	1%	2%	10%
Qriously/Brandwatch	Oct 1–4	2,048 (LV)	± 2.7%	38%	51%	1%	0%	–	3%	6%	13%
SurveyUSA	Oct 1–4	1,114 (LV)	± 3.6%	43%	53%	–	–	2%	–	3%	10%
CNN/SSRS	Oct 1–4	1,001 (LV)	± 3.6%	41%	57%	–	–	1%	0%	1%	16%
Global Marketing Research/FPU/Boston Herald	Sep 30 – Oct 4	1,003 (LV)	± 3.1%	37%	51%	–	–	3% (Note: "Third party candidate" with 3%)	–	8%	14%
NBC/WSJ	Oct 2–3	800 (RV)	± 3.46%	39%	53%	–	–	2% (Note: "Neither/other" with 2%)	–	6%	14%
Ipsos/Reuters	Oct 2–3	596 (LV)	± 5%	41%	51%	–	–	4% (Note: "Third party candidate" with 4%)	–	4%	10%
YouGov/Yahoo News	Oct 2–3	1,088 (LV)	–	43%	51%	–	–	2%	0%	5%	8%
RMG Research/Just the News	Oct 1–3	763 (LV)	± 3.5%	43%	51%	1%	1%	1%	–	3%	8%
RMG Research/Just the News	Oct 1–3	763 (LV)	± 3.5%	41%	53%	1%	1%	1%	–	3%	12%
RMG Research/Just the News	Oct 1–3	763 (LV)	± 3.5%	45%	49%	1%	1%	1%	–	3%	4%
Morning Consult	Oct 1–3	12,000 (LV)	± 1%	43%	52%	–	–	2%	–	4%	9%
Zogby Strategies/EMI Research	Oct 2	1,002 (LV)	± 3.2%	45%	47%	2%	2%	–	–	4%	2%
Zogby Strategies/EMI Research	Oct 2	1,002 (LV)	± 3.2%	47%	49%	–	–	–	–	4%	2%
YouGov/Yahoo News	Oct 1–2	1,345 (LV)	–	40%	48%	–	–	3%	0%	8%	8%
St. Leo University	Sep 27 – Oct 2	947 (LV)	± 3%	38%	52%	–	–	–	–	6%	14%
HarrisX/The Hill	Sep 30 – Oct 1	928 (RV)	± 3.2%	40%	47%	–	–	3%	3%	7%	7%
Data for Progress	Sep 30 – Oct 1	1,146 (LV)	± 2.9%	41%	51%	–	–	–	–	8%	10%
IBD/TIPP	Sep 30 – Oct 1	1,021 (LV)	± 3.5%	46%	49%	–	–	1.5% (Note: "Another candidate" with 1.5%)	–	4%	3%
SurveyMonkey/Long Island University	Sep 30 – Oct 1	1,502 (A)	± 3.5%	31%	48%	–	–	7% (Note: "Another candidate" with 7%)	5%	9%	17%
SurveyMonkey/Axios	Sep 29 – Oct 1	24,022 (LV)	–	46%	52%	–	–	–	–	–	6%
Ipsos/Reuters	Sep 29 – Oct 1	882 (LV)	± 3.8%	41%	50%	–	–	4%	–	5%	9%

=== September 1–30, 2020 ===
Poll source	Date	Sample size	Margin of error	Donald Trump Republican	Joe Biden Democratic	Jo Jorgensen Libertarian	Howie Hawkins Green	Other	Abstention	Undecided	Lead
Change Research/CNBC	Sep 29–30	925 (LV)	± 3.22%	41%	54%	–	–	–	–	–	13%
YouGov/Economist	Sep 27–30	1,350 (LV)	–	42%	50%	–	–	2%	0%	6%	8%
Morning Consult	Sep 27–30	12,000 (LV)	± 1%	43%	51%	–	–	2%	–	4%	8%
Winston Group (R)	Sep 26–30	1,000 (RV)	–	43%	47%	–	–	–	–	10%	4%
SurveyMonkey/Axios	Sep 1–30	152,640 (LV)	–	46%	52%	–	–	–	–	2%	6%
Ipsos/Reuters	Sep 25–29	864 (LV)	± 3.8%	42%	51%	–	–	3%	–	4%	9%
Pulse Opinion Research/Rasmussen Reports	Sep 23–29	3,000 (LV)	± 2%	43%	51%	–	–	3%	–	3%	8%
Global Strategy Group/GBAO	Sep 26–28	1,002 (RV)	± 3.1%	43%	53%	–	–	–	1%	4%	10%
Redfield & Wilton Strategies	Sep 26–27	2,445 (LV)	–	40%	50%	2%	1%	1%	No voters	7%	10%
Zogby Analytics	Sep 25–27	833 (LV)	± 3.3%	43%	46%	5%	2%	–	–	5%	3%
Léger	Sep 25–27	854 (LV)	± 3.1%	40%	47%	2%	2%	1%	1%	8%	7%
Morning Consult	Sep 25–27	12,965 (LV)	± 1%	44%	51%	–	–	2%	–	4%	7%
Qriously/Brandwatch	Sep 24–27	2,273 (LV)	± 2.6%	40%	50%	1%	1%	–	2%	6%	10%
Monmouth University	Sep 24–27	809 (LV)	± 3.5%	45%	50%	1%	1%	–	–	–	5%
PureSpectrum/COVID-19 Consortium	Aug 7 – Sep 27	26,838 (LV)	–	40%	50%	–	–	–	–	–	10%
RMG Research/Just the News	Sep 24–26	752 (LV)	± 3.6%	45%	51%	0%	1%	0%	–	3%	6%
RMG Research/Just the News	Sep 24–26	752 (LV)	± 3.6%	44%	52%	0%	1%	0%	–	3%	8%
RMG Research/Just the News	Sep 24–26	752 (LV)	± 3.6%	47%	49%	0%	1%	0%	–	3%	2%
SurveyMonkey/Long Island University	Sep 24–26	1,508 (A)	± 3.5%	30%	48%	–	–	5% (Note: "Another candidate" with 5%)	6%	10%	18%
HarrisX/The Hill	Sep 22–25	2,768 (RV)	± 1.86%	40%	45%	–	–	4%	4%	7%	5%
Echelon Insights	Sep 19–25	1,018 (LV)	–	41%	50%	2%	1%	1%	–	6%	9%
Echelon Insights	Sep 19–25	1,018 (LV)	–	43%	51%	–	–	–	–	6%	8%
Harvard-Harris	Sep 22–24	– (LV)	–	45%	47%	–	–	–	–	–	2%
Siena College/NYT Upshot	Sep 22–24	950 (LV)	± 3.5%	41%	49%	2%	1%	0% (Note: "Someone else" with 0%)	0%	7%	8%
Morning Consult	Sep 22–24	12,000 (LV)	± 1%	44%	51%	–	–	2%	–	4%	7%
Ipsos/Reuters	Sep 22–24	934 (LV)	–	41%	50%	–	–	4%	–	4%	9%
ABC News/Washington Post	Sep 21–24	739 (LV)	± 4%	43%	49%	4%	3%	0% (Note: "Other" and "None of these" with 0%)	1%	1%	6%
ABC News/Washington Post	Sep 21–24	739 (LV)	± 4%	44%	54%	–	–	0%	0%	1%	10%
Redfield & Wilton Strategies	Sep 22–23	2,500 (LV)	± 2.19%	41%	50%	2%	1%	1%	–	7%	9%
Emerson College	Sep 22–23	1,000 (LV)	± 3%	47%	50%	–	–	4%	–	–	3%
YouGov/Yahoo News	Sep 21–23	1,125 (LV)	–	44%	49%	–	–	1%	0%	6%	5%
JL Partners	Sep 14–23	4,053 (LV)	–	41%	51%	–	–	2%	–	6%	10%
Data For Progress	Sep 22	740 (RV)	–	42%	55%	–	–	3%	–	–	13%
YouGov/Economist	Sep 20–22	1,124 (LV)	–	42%	49%	–	–	2%	0%	6%	7%
Ipsos/Reuters	Sep 18–22	889 (LV)	± 3.7%	42%	50%	–	–	4%	–	5%	8%
Pulse Opinion Research/Rasmussen Reports	Sep 16–17, Sep 20–22	3,000 (LV)	± 2.5%	47%	48%	–	–	3%	–	2%	1%
YouGov/Hofstra University	Sep 14–22	2,000 (LV)	± 2.92%	42%	53%	–	–	5%	–	–	11%
Public Religion Research Institute	Sep 9–22	1,736 (LV) (Note: Likely voter model assuming 68% turnout)	± 3.2%	42%	57%	–	–	–	–	–	15%
Public Religion Research Institute	Sep 9–22	1,387 (LV)	± 3.6%	44%	55%	–	–	0% (Note: "Skipped/Refused" with 0%)	–	0%	11%
HarrisX/The Hill	Sep 19–21	2,803 (RV)	± 1.9%	40%	45%	–	–	4%	4%	7%	5%
Morning Consult	Sep 19–21	12,000 (LV)	± 1%	43%	51%	–	–	2%	–	4%	8%
Global Strategy Group/GBAO	Sep 17–21	1,230 (RV)	± 2.8%	42%	53%	–	–	–	2%	3%	11%
Quinnipiac University	Sep 17–21	1,302 (LV)	± 2.7%	42%	52%	–	–	1%	–	4%	10%
Ipsos/Survey Center on American Life	Sep 11–21	2,006 (A)	± 2.4%	37%	47%	–	–	6% (Note: "Someone else" with 4%; "Refused" with 2%)	11%	–	10%
USC Dornsife	Sep 8–21	5,482 (LV)	–	42%	52%	–	–	–	–	–	10%
USC Dornsife	Sep 8–21	5,482 (LV)	–	42%	51%	–	–	–	–	–	9%
Change Research/CNBC	Sep 18–20	1,430 (LV)	± 2.59%	42%	51%	4%	1%	–	0%	3%	9%
Léger	Sep 18–20	830 (LV)	± 3.1%	41%	48%	–	–	5%	1%	5%	7%
Morning Consult	Sep 18–20	1,988 (RV)	± 2%	41%	48%	–	–	3% (Note: "Someone else" with 3%)	–	7%	7%
Qriously/Brandwatch	Sep 17–20	2,134 (LV)	± 3%	39%	46%	2%	0%	–	2%	12%	7%
RMG Research/Just the News	Sep 17–19	773 (LV)	± 3.5%	44%	50%	2%	1%	1%	–	3%	6%
RMG Research/Just the News	Sep 17–19	773 (LV)	± 3.5%	42%	52%	2%	1%	1%	–	3%	10%
RMG Research/Just the News	Sep 17–19	773 (LV)	± 3.5%	46%	49%	2%	1%	1%	–	3%	3%
IBD/TIPP	Sep 16–19	962 (LV)	–	44%	50%	–	–	2%	–	5%	6%
Morning Consult	Sep 16–18	12,000 (LV)	± 1%	44%	51%	–	–	2%	–	4%	7%
YouGov/Yahoo News	Sep 15–17	1,223 (RV)	–	41%	47%	–	–	2%	1%	9%	6%
Ipsos/Reuters	Sep 15–17	834 (LV)	± 3.8%	42%	51%	–	–	3%	–	4%	9%
Redfield & Wilton Strategies	Sep 15–16	1,070 (LV)	± 1.97%	41%	49%	2%	1%	1%	–	7%	8%
NBC/WSJ	Sep 13–16	1,000 (RV)	± 3.1%	43%	51%	–	–	3%	–	3%	8%
GBAO/Omidyar Network	Sep 12–16	1,150 (RV)	–	39%	51%	–	–	3%	1%	6%	12%
Marist/NPR/PBS Newshour	Sep 11–16	723 (LV)		42%	49%	5%	2%	0%	–	2%	7%
Marist/NPR/PBS Newshour	Sep 11–16	723 (LV)		43%	52%	–	–	3%	–	2%	9%
Data for Progress	Sep 15	809 (RV)	–	42%	53%	–	–	5% (Note: "A different candidate" with 5%)	–	–	11%
YouGov/Economist	Sep 13–15	1,061 (LV)	–	42%	51%	–	–	1%	0%	5%	9%
Morning Consult	Sep 13–15	12,000 (LV)	± 1%	43%	51%	–	–	2%	–	4%	8%
Ipsos/Reuters	Sep 11–15	859 (LV)	± 3.8%	41%	50%	–	–	3%	–	6%	9%
Pulse Opinion Research/Rasmussen Reports	Sep 9–10, Sep 13–15	2,500 (LV)	± 2%	47%	46%	–	–	3%	–	4%	1%
Marquette Law School	Sep 8–15	1,357 (LV)	–	40%	50%	3%	2%	3% (Note: "Someone else" with 3%; "Refused" with 0%)	2%	–	10%
AP-NORC	Sep 11–14	1,108 (A)	± 4%	40%	44%	–	–	7% (Note: "Another candidate" with 7%; "Skipped/Refused" with 1%)	7%	0%	4%
Morning Consult	Sep 10–14	1,144 (LV)	–	44%	56%	–	–	–	–	–	12%
Morning Consult	Sep 10–14	1,277 (LV)	–	45%	55%	–	–	–	–	–	10%
Global Strategy Group/GBAO	Sep 10–14	1,007 (RV)	± 3.1%	42%	53%	–	–	–	1%	4%	11%
HarrisX/The Hill	Sep 10–14	3,758 (RV)	± 1.6%	39%	45%	–	–	4%	4%	8%	6%
Léger	Sep 11–13	833 (LV)	± 3.1%	41%	47%	2%	0%	1%	1%	7%	6%
Qriously/Brandwatch	Sep 10–13	2,065 (LV)	± 2.5%	42%	46%	1%	0%	–	1%	9%	4%
Morning Consult	Sep 10–12	12,000 (LV)	± 1%	43%	51%	–	–	2%	–	4%	8%
RMG Research/Just the News	Sep 10–12	941 (LV)	± 3.2%	43%	48%	2%	1%	1%	–	6%	5%
YouGov/Yahoo News	Sep 9–11	1,216 (RV)	–	39%	49%	–	–	1%	2%	9%	10%
Pollfish/Socioanalítica Research	Sep 8–10	– (RV) (Note: Registered Voters subsample of full sample of 2019 adults)	–	45%	53%	–	–	-	-	–	8%
Fox News	Sep 7–10	1,191 (LV)	± 2.5%	46%	51%	–	–	1%	–	2%	5%
Opinium	Sep 4–10	1,234 (LV)	–	42%	51%	–	–	2%	–	5%	9%
Climate Nexus	Sep 8–9	1,244 (LV)	–	41%	52%	–	–	3% (Note: "Other candidate or neither candidate" with 3%)	–	4%	11%
Morning Consult	Sep 7–9	12,000 (LV)	± 1%	44%	51%	–	–	2%	–	4%	7%
Redfield & Wilton Strategies	Sep 7–8	1,852 (LV)	± 2.19%	40%	49%	1%	1%	1%	–	7%	9%
YouGov/Economist	Sep 6–8	1,057 (LV)	–	43%	52%	–	–	2%	0%	3%	9%
HarrisX/The Hill	Sep 5–8	2,831 (RV)	± 1.84%	39%	47%	–	–	5%	4%	7%	8%
Monmouth University	Sep 3–8	758 (LV)	± 3.6%	44%	51%	1%	1%	–	–	2%	7%
Ipsos/Reuters	Sep 3–8	823 (LV)	± 3.9%	40%	52%	–	–	3%	–	5%	12%
Pulse Opinion Research/Rasmussen Reports	Sep 2–3, Sep 6–8	2,500 (LV)	± 2%	46%	48%	–	–	4%	–	3%	2%
Hart Research Associates/Protect Our Care (Note: Protect Our Care is a pro-Affordable Care Act organisation)	Sep 3–7	1,202 (LV)	–	43%	51%	–	–	6% (Note: "Undecided/third party" with 6%)	–	–	8%
Qriously/Brandwatch	Sep 3–7	2,013 (LV)	± 2.8%	41%	47%	1%	0%	–	1%	9%	6%
USC Dornsife	Aug 25 – Sep 7	5,144 (LV)	–	42%	51%	–	–	–	–	–	9%
USC Dornsife	Aug 25 – Sep 7	5,144 (LV)	–	42%	52%	–	–	–	–	–	10%
Research Co.	Sep 4–6	1,114 (LV)	± 2.9%	41%	49%	1%	1%	1%	–	7%	8%
Léger	Sep 4–6	861 (LV)	± 3.19%	41%	47%	2%	1%	1%	0%	7%	6%
Morning Consult	Sep 4–6	12,965 (LV)	± 1%	43%	50%	–	–	2%	–	4%	7%
Change Research/CNBC	Sep 4–6	1,902 (LV)	± 2.25%	43%	49%	3%	2%	–	1%	2%	6%
Targoz Market Research/PollSmart Market Research	Sep 2–6	1,039 (LV)	± 2.98%	46%	48%	–	–	6%	–	–	2%
Politico/Harvard/SSRS	Aug 25 – Sep 6	1,459 (LV)	± 3%	42%	52%	–	–	1%	2%	3%	10%
YouGov/CBS	Sep 2–4	2,433 (LV)	± 2.4%	42%	52%	–	–	3% (Note: "Someone else/third party" with 3%)	–	3%	10%
Morning Consult	Sep 1–3	12,000 (LV)	± 1%	43%	51%	–	–	2%	–	4%	8%
Kaiser Family Foundation	Aug 28 – Sep 3	989 (RV)	± 4%	43%	48%	–	–	–	–	6%	5%
Ipsos/Reuters	Sep 1–2	1,113 (A)	± 3.3%	38%	42%	–	–	7% (Note: "Some other candidate" with 7%)	6%	7%	4%
Ipsos/Reuters	Sep 1–2	1,113 (A)	± 3.3%	45% (Note: If only Biden and Trump were candidates and including voters who lean towards a given candidate)	51%	–	–	–	–	–	6%
Harvard-Harris	Aug 31 – Sep 2	1,493 (LV) (Note: LV subsample of full 1,604 RV sample)	–	47%	53%	–	–	–	–	–	6%
Data for Progress	Sep 1	695 (RV)	–	43%	53%	–	–	4% (Note: "A different candidate" with 4%)	–	–	10%
Ipsos/Reuters	Aug 31 – Sep 1	1,089 (RV)	± 3.4%	40%	47%	–	–	5%	2%	5%	7%
Redfield & Wilton Strategies	Aug 31 – Sep 1	1,835 (LV)	–	41%	49%	2%	1%	1%	–	7%	8%
YouGov/Economist	Aug 30 – Sep 1	1,207 (RV)	± 3.6%	40%	51%	–	–	2%	2%	4%	11%
IBD/TIPP	Aug 29 – Sep 1	1,033 (RV)	–	41%	49%	–	–	–	–	–	8%
CNN/SSRS	Aug 28 – Sep 1	997 (RV)	± 4%	43%	51%	–	–	1%	2%	3%	8%
Pulse Opinion Research/Rasmussen Reports	Aug 26–27, Aug 30 – Sep 1	2,500 (LV)	± 2%	45%	49%	–	–	3%	–	3%	4%

=== July 1 – August 31, 2020 ===
Poll source	Date	Sample size	Margin of error	Donald Trump Republican	Joe Biden Democratic	Jo Jorgensen Libertarian	Howie Hawkins Green	Other	Abstention	Undecided	Lead
Emerson College	Aug 30–31	1,567 (LV)	± 2.4%	49%	51%	–	–	–	–	–	2%
Morning Consult	Aug 29–31	12,000 (LV)	± 1%	43%	51%	–	–	2%	–	4%	8%
HarrisX/The Hill	Aug 29–31	2,834 (RV)	± 1.84%	40%	46%	–	–	4%	4%	7%	6%
Quinnipiac University	Aug 28–31	1,081 (LV)	± 3%	42%	52%	–	–	2%	–	3%	10%
Suffolk University/USA Today	Aug 28–31	1,000 (RV)	± 3.1%	42%	47%	1%	0%	3% (Note: "Refused" with 2%; "Someone else" with 1%)	7%	1%	5%
Suffolk University/USA Today	Aug 28–31	1,000 (RV)	± 3.1%	43%	50%	–	–	3% (Note: "Refused" with 3%)	–	4%	7%
Global Strategy Group/GBAO	Aug 27–31	1,309 (RV)	± 3.1%	43%	52%	–	–	–	1%	4%	9%
Qriously/Brandwatch	Aug 27–31	1,998 (LV)	± 2.7%	41%	46%	2%	1%	–	1%	10%	5%
SurveyMonkey/Axios	Aug 1–31	131,263 (LV)	–	46%	52%	–	–	–	–	2%	6%
Léger	Aug 28–30	861 (LV)	± 3.1%	42%	49%	1%	0%	1%	1%	6%	7%
Selzer & Co./Grinnell College	Aug 26–30	827 (LV)	± 3.4%	41%	49%	–	–	3%	1%	5%	8%
Atlas Intel	Aug 24–30	4,210 (LV)	± 2%	46%	49%	–	–	2%	1%	1%	3%
John Zogby Strategies/EMI Research	Aug 29	1,007 (LV)	± 3.2%	42%	45%	3%	2%	–	–	–	3%
John Zogby Strategies/EMI Research	Aug 29	1,007 (LV)	± 3.2%	42%	48%	–	–	–	–	10%	6%
Morning Consult	Aug 29	4,035 (LV)	± 2%	44%	50%	–	–	7% (Note: "Someone else/don't know/no opinion" with 7%)	–	–	6%
RMG Research/Just the News	Aug 27–29	915 (LV) (Note: Results with tighter Likely Voter screen; additional data sourced from FiveThirtyEight)	± 3.2%	44%	48%	2%	1%	1%	–	4%	4%
RMG Research/Just the News	Aug 27–29	– (Note: Sample size not yet released, but results with looser Likely Voter screen)	–	42%	50%	–	–	–	–	–	8%
YouGov/Yahoo News	Aug 27–28	807 (RV)	–	41%	47%	–	–	3%	1%	8%	6%
Morning Consult	Aug 26–28	12,000 (LV)	± 1%	43%	50%	–	–	2%	–	4%	7%
HarrisX/The Hill	Aug 25–28	2,862 (RV)	± 1.83%	38%	47%	–	–	4%	4%	8%	9%
Survey Sampling International/University of Maryland	Aug 24–28	1,724 (A)	± 2.36%	37%	50%	-	-	5% (Note: "Other" with 4%; "No response" with 0%)	3%	7%	13%
Redfield & Wilton Strategies	Aug 25–26	1,834 (LV)	–	39%	49%	2%	1%	1%	–	9%	10%
Opinium/The Guardian	Aug 21–26	1,257 (LV)	–	39%	54%	–	–	2%	–	5%	15%
YouGov/Economist	Aug 23–25	1,254 (RV)	–	41%	50%	–	–	1%	3%	4%	9%
Morning Consult	Aug 23–25	12,000 (LV)	± 1%	43%	51%	–	–	2%	–	4%	8%
HarrisX/The Hill	Aug 22–25	2,861(RV)	± 1.84%	38%	47%	–	–	4%	3%	8%	9%
Pulse Opinion Research/Rasmussen Reports	Aug 19–20, Aug 23–25	2,500 (LV)	± 2.5%	45%	46%	–	–	6% (Note: "Some other candidate" with 6%)	–	4%	1%
Ipsos/Reuters	Aug 19–25	3,829 (RV)	± 1.8%	40%	47%	–	–	5%	2%	6%	7%
Global Strategy Group/GBAO	Aug 21–24	1,319 (RV)	± 3.1%	41%	54%	–	–	–	1%	5%	13%
USC Dornsife	Aug 11–24	4,317 (LV)	–	39%	54%	–	–	–	–	–	15%
USC Dornsife	Aug 11–24	4,325 (LV)	–	40%	53%	–	–	–	–	–	13%
Morning Consult	Aug 23	4,810 (LV)	± 1%	42%	52%	–	–	6% (Note: "Someone else/don't know/no opinion" with 6%)	–	–	10%
Change Research/CNBC	Aug 21–23	2,362 (LV)	± 2.02%	43%	51%	2%	2%	–	0%	2%	8%
Léger	Aug 21–23	894 (LV)	± 3.1%	40%	49%	2%	1%	1%	1%	6%	9%
YouGov/Yahoo News	Aug 20–23	906 (RV)	–	39%	50%	–	–	3%	2%	7%	11%
Survey Sampling International/University of Maryland	Aug 18–23	2,208 (A)	± 2.09%	39%	48%	-	-	5%	3%	6%	9%
Morning Consult	Aug 20–22	12,000 (LV)	± 1%	43%	52%	–	–	2%	–	4%	9%
YouGov/CBS	Aug 20–22	934 (LV)	± 3.7%	42%	52%	–	–	4% (Note: "Someone else/third party" with 4%)	–	3%	10%
Morning Consult	Aug 21	4,377 (LV)	± 1%	43%	52%	–	–	6%	–	–	9%
Redfield & Wilton Strategies	Aug 19–20	1,860 (LV)	–	39%	49%	1%	1%	1%	–	9%	10%
Zogby Analytics	Aug 17–19	901 (LV)	–	43%	46%	5%	2%	–	–	5%	3%
Morning Consult	Aug 17–19	12,000 (LV)	± 1%	43%	51%	–	–	2%	–	4%	8%
YouGov/Economist	Aug 16–18	1,246 (RV)	± 3.4%	40%	50%	–	–	4%	1%	4%	10%
HarrisX/The Hill	Aug 15–18	2,840 (RV)	± 1.84%	38%	46%	–	–	4%	3%	8%	8%
Ipsos/Reuters	Aug 14–18	1,179 (RV)	± 3.3%	40%	48%	–	–	5%	1%	5%	8%
Echelon Insights	Aug 14–18	1,004 (LV)	± 3.3%	38%	51%	2%	1%	1% (Note: Kanye West (affiliated with the Birthday Party, but listed in the poll as an independent) with 1%)	–	8%	13%
Echelon Insights	Aug 14–18	1,004 (LV)	± 3.3%	39%	53%	–	–	–	–	8%	14%
Pulse Opinion Research/Rasmussen Reports	Aug 12–18	2,500 (LV)	± 2%	44%	48%	–	–	4%	–	4%	4%
Morning Consult	Aug 17	4,141 (LV)	± 2%	43%	51%	–	–	7%	–	–	8%
Léger	Aug 14–16	1,001 (A)	± 3.1%	35%	51%	–	–	3% (Note: "Prefer not to answer" with 3%)	–	10%	16%
Morning Consult	Aug 14–16	11,809 (LV)	± 1%	43%	51%	–	–	2%	–	4%	8%
EKOS Research Associates	Aug 7–16	710 (A)	± 3.7%	42%	43%	–	–	12% (Note: "Other" with 8%; "Refused" with 4%)	1% (Note: Listed as "Not eligible to vote")	3%	1%
YouGov/Yahoo News	Aug 14–15	1,027 (LV)	–	41%	50%	–	–	–	–	–	9%
ABC News/Washington Post	Aug 12–15	707 (LV)	–	44%	54%	–	–	–	–	–	10%
CNN/SSRS	Aug 12–15	987 (RV)	± 3.7%	46%	50%	–	–	1% (Note: "Other" with 1%)	2% (Note: Listed as "Neither")	2%	4%
Data For Progress	Aug 13–14	1,143 (LV)	± 2.7%	41%	50%	–	–	–	–	9%	9%
YouGov/CBS	Aug 12–14	2,152 (LV)	± 2.4%	42%	52%	–	–	4%	–	2%	10%
Harris X/The Hill	Aug 11–14	2,823 (RV)	± 1.84%	39%	45%	–	–	4%	4%	7%	6%
Morning Consult	Aug 11–13	12,000 (LV)	± 1%	42%	51%	–	–	2%	–	5%	9%
Redfield and Wilton Strategies	Aug 12	1,867 (LV)	–	41%	48%	2%	1%	1%	–	7%	7%
NBC/Wall Street Journal	Aug 9–12	900 (RV)	± 3.27%	41%	50%	–	–	5% (Note: "Neither/other" with 5%)	–	4%	9%
Fox News	Aug 9–12	1,000 (RV)	± 3%	42%	49%	–	–	3%	1%	5%	7%
Data for Progress	Aug 11	782 (RV)	–	40%	53%	–	–	8% (Note: "A different candidate" with 8%)	–	–	13%
Ipsos/Reuters	Aug 10–11	1,034 (RV)	± 3.5%	42% (Note: With voters who lean towards a given candidate if only Biden and Trump were candidates)	58%	–	–	–	–	–	16%
Ipsos/Reuters	Aug 10–11	1,034 (RV)	± 3.5%	38%	49%	2%	1%	5% (Note: "Some other candidate" with 3%; West (B) with 2%)	2%	6%	11%
YouGov/Economist	Aug 9–11	1,201 (RV)	± 3.6%	39%	49%	–	–	5%	1%	5%	10%
HarrisX/The Hill	Aug 8–11	2,828 (RV)	± 1.84%	40%	44%	–	–	4%	4%	9%	4%
Pulse Opinion Research/Rasmussen Reports	Aug 5–11	2,500 (LV)	± 2%	43%	49%	–	–	4%	–	4%	6%
Marist/NPR/PBS News Hours	Aug 3–11	1,120 (RV)	± 3.3%	42%	53%	–	–	2%	–	4%	11%
NORC/AEI	Jul 31 – Aug 11, 2020	4,067 (A)	± 2%	37%	48%	–	–	6% (Note: "Someone else" with 5%; "Refused" with 1%)	10%	–	11%
Morning Consult/Politico	Aug 9–10	1,983 (RV)	± 2%	40%	49%	–	–	2% (Note: Kanye West (B) with 2%)	–	9%	9%
Morning Consult	Aug 8–10	12,000 (LV)	± 1%	43%	51%	–	–	2%	–	4%	8%
Global Strategy Group/GBAO	Aug 6–10	1,419 (RV)	± 3.1%	43%	52%	–	–	–	1%	5%	9%
Monmouth	Aug 6–10	785 (RV)	± 3.5%	41%	51%	2%	1%	1% (Note: "Other candidate" with 1%)	1%	4%	10%
Morning Consult/Murmuration	Aug 4–10	2,200 (A)	± 2%	41%	54%	–	–	5%	–	–	13%
Change Research/CNBC	Aug 7–9	2,143 (LV)	± 2.12%	44%	50%	3%	1%	–	0%	2%	6%
RMG Research	Aug 6–8	1,200 (RV)	± 2.8%	37%	45%	1%	1%	3%	–	14%	8%
Morning Consult	Aug 5–7	12,000 (LV)	± 1%	42%	51%	–	–	2%	–	5%	9%
Léger	Aug 4–7	1,007 (LV)	–	39%	47%	3%	1%	3% (Note: West (B) with 3%)	2%	6%	8%
Georgetown University/Battleground	Aug 1–6	1,000 (LV)	± 3.1%	40%	53%	–	–	–	–	7%	13%
HarrisX/The Hill	Aug 2–5	2,850 (RV)	± 1.84%	40%	43%	–	–	5%	3%	9%	3%
Research Co.	Aug 3–4	1,018 (LV)	± 3.1%	38%	48%	2%	1%	1%	–	7%	10%
Ipsos/Reuters	Aug 3–4	964 (RV)	± 3.6%	38%	48%	–	–	6%	2%	6%	10%
YouGov/Economist	Aug 2–4	1,225 (RV)	± 3.3%	40%	49%	–	–	3%	2%	6%	9%
Morning Consult	Aug 2–4	12,000 (LV)	± 1%	42%	51%	–	–	3%	–	5%	9%
Pulse Opinion Research/Rasmussen Reports	Jul 29–30, Aug 2–4	2,500 (LV)	± 2%	45%	48%	–	–	3%	–	3%	3%
Pew Research	Jul 27 – Aug 2	9,114 (RV)	± 1.5%	45%	53%	–	–	2%	–	0%	8%
Morning Consult	Jul 30 – Aug 1	12,000 (LV)	± 1%	43%	50%	–	–	2%	–	4%	7%
SurveyMonkey/Axios	Jul 1–31	145,585 (LV)	–	47%	51%	–	–	–	–	2%	4%
Emerson College	Jul 29–30	964 (LV)	± 3.1%	47%	53%	–	–	–	–	–	6%
YouGov/Yahoo News	Jul 28–30	1,088 (RV)	–	40%	49%	–	–	2%	1%	8%	9%
Morning Consult	Jul 27–29	12,000 (LV)	± 1%	43%	50%	–	–	3%	–	4%	7%
Data For Progress	Jul 28	794 (RV)	–	42%	52%	–	–	8%	–	–	10%
Ipsos/Reuters	Jul 27–28	947 (RV)	± 3.6%	38%	47%	–	–	7%	2%	6%	9%
YouGov/Economist	Jul 26–28	1,260 (RV)	± 3.4%	40%	49%	–	–	4%	1%	6%	9%
IBD/TIPP	Jul 25–28	1,160 (RV)	± 3.1%	41%	48%	–	–	–	–	–	7%
Optimus	Jul 24–28	914 (LV)	–	40%	48%	–	–	3% (Note: "Other candidate" with 3%)	1%	8%	8%
Pulse Opinion Research/Rasmussen Reports	Jul 22–23, Jul 26–28	2,500 (LV)	± 2%	42%	48%	–	–	5%	–	4%	6%
NORC/HKS Carr Center	Jul 6–28	1,863 (RV)	–	34%	48%	–	–	0% (Note: "Skipped on web" and "Refused" with 0%)	–	18%	14%
Beacon Research/The Dream Corps	Jul 23–27	1,504 (RV)	–	41%	48%	–	–	4%	2%	5%	7%
YouGov Blue/Data For Progress	Jul 21–27	1,059 (LV)	–	45%	51%	–	–	–	–	–	6%
Change Research/CNBC	Jul 24–26	1,039 (LV)	± 3.04%	42%	51%	2%	1%	–	1%	3%	9%
Morning Consult	Jul 24–26	12,235 (LV)	± 1%	43%	51%	–	–	2%	–	5%	8%
RMG Research	Jul 23–25	1,200 (RV)	–	37%	45%	2%	1%	3%	–	12%	8%
YouGov/CBS News	Jul 21–24	1,401 (LV)	± 3.1%	41%	51%	–	–	4%	–	4%	10%
Zogby Analytics	Jul 21–23	1,516 (LV)	± 2.5%	40%	44%	5%	2%	–	–	9%	4%
Harvard-Harris	Jul 21–23	1,786 (LV)	–	45%	55%	–	–	–	–	–	10%
Morning Consult	Jul 21–23	12,000 (LV)	± 1%	42%	51%	–	–	3%	–	5%	9%
Echelon Insights	Jul 17–22	1,000 (LV)	–	37%	50%	3%	1%	–	–	9%	13%
Echelon Insights	Jul 17–22	1,000 (LV)	–	38%	53%	–	–	–	–	9%	15%
Data for Progress	Jul 21	652 (RV)	–	44%	50%	–	–	6%	–	–	6%
YouGov/Economist	Jul 19–21	1,222 (RV)	± 3.2%	41%	48%	–	–	5%	2%	4%	7%
Ipsos/Reuters	Jul 15–21	3,744 (RV)	± 1.8%	38%	46%	–	–	8%	2%	6%	8%
Pulse Opinion Research/Rasmussen Reports	Jul 15–21	2,500 (LV)	± 2%	45%	47%	–	–	5%	–	4%	2%
Morning Consult	Jul 18–20	12,000 (LV)	± 1%	42%	50%	–	–	3%	–	5%	8%
HarrisX/The Hill	Jul 17–20	2,829 (RV)	± 1.84%	38%	45%	–	–	5%	4%	9%	7%
AP-NORC	Jul 16–20	1,057 (A)	± 4.3%	34%	46%	–	–	11% (Note: "Another candidate" with 10%; "Skipped/Refused" with 1%)	8%	0%	12%
Morning Consult/Politico	Jul 17–19	1,991 (RV)	± 2%	40%	47%	–	–	–	–	–	7%
GQR Research	Jul 15–19	1,000 (RV)	± 3.1%	44%	55%	–	–	1%	–	0%	11%
Kaiser Family Foundation	Jul 14–19	1,117 (RV)	± 4%	38%	47%	–	–	3%	2%	10%	9%
Morning Consult	Jul 13–19	31,310 (RV)	± 1%	40%	47%	–	–	–	–	–	7%
Benenson Strategy Group/GS Strategy Group	Jul 15–18	1,301 (LV)	–	39%	50%	–	–	4%	1%	7%	11%
Morning Consult	Jul 15–17	12,000 (LV)	± 1%	42%	50%	–	–	3%	–	5%	8%
ABC News/Washington Post	Jul 12–15	673 (LV)	–	44%	54%	–	–	–	–	–	10%
Fox News	Jul 12–15	1,104 (RV)	± 3%	41%	49%	–	–	4%	1%	5%	8%
Ipsos/Reuters	Jul 13–14	961 (RV)	± 3.6%	37%	47%	–	–	7%	2%	7%	10%
YouGov/Economist	Jul 12–14	1,252 (RV)	± 3.3%	40%	49%	–	–	4%	2%	4%	9%
Morning Consult	Jul 12–14	12,000 (LV)	± 1%	42%	50%	–	–	3%	–	5%	8%
YouGov/Yahoo News	Jul 11–14	1,081 (RV)	± 3.6%	39%	47%	–	–	3%	1%	10%	8%
Pulse Opinion Research/Rasmussen Reports	Jul 8–14	1,500 (LV)	± 4.5%	44%	47%	–	–	5%	–	4%	3%
Quinnipiac University	Jul 9–13	1,273 (RV)	± 2.8%	37%	52%	–	–	3%	2%	6%	15%
Morning Consult	Jul 6–13	32,514 (RV)	±2.0%	39%	47%	–	–	–	–	–	8%
Change Research/CNBC	Jul 10–12	1,258 (LV)	± 2.76%	41%	51%	3%	2%	0%	2%	2%	10%
NBC/WSJ	Jul 9–12	900 (RV)	± 3.27%	40%	51%	–	–	–	7%	2%	11%
RMG Research/Scott Rasmussen/Just the News	Jul 9–11	1,200 (RV)	±5.0%	39%	46%	–	–	6%	–	8%	7%
Morning Consult	Jul 9–11	12,000 (LV)	± 1%	42%	50%	–	–	3%	–	5%	8%
Redfield & Wilton Strategies	Jul 9	1,853 (LV)	2.5%	40%	48%	1%	1%	1%	–	9%	8%
Redfield & Wilton Strategies	Jul 9	1,853 (LV)	2.5%	39% (Note: With Kanye West)	48%	2%	1%	2% (Note: Kanye West)	–	8%	9%
SurveyMonkey/Study Finds	Released Jul 8	469 (A)	9.5%	37%	55%	–	–	8%	–	–	18%
SurveyMonkey/Study Finds	Released Jul 8	469 (A)	9.5%	39% (Note: Without Kanye West)	61%	–	–	–	–	–	21%
Zogby Analytics/EMI Research	Jul 8	1,000 (LV)	5.6%	42%	49%	–	–	–	–	9%	7%
Morning Consult	Jul 6–8	12,000 (LV)	± 1%	42%	51%	–	–	3%	–	4%	9%
Democracy Fund & UCLA Nationscape	Jul 2–8	4,983 (RV)	1.5%	41%	49%	–	–	–	–	–	8%
Data for Progress	Jul 7	673 (RV)	5.8	42%	52%	–	–	6%	–	–	10%
Ipsos/Reuters	Jul 6–7	952 (RV)	± 3.6%	37%	43%	–	–	10%	3%	7%	6%
Pulse Opinion Research/Rasmussen Reports	Jul 5–7	1,500 (LV)	± 5.0%	40%	50%	–	–	–	–	6%	10%
YouGov/Economist	Jul 5–7	1,165 (RV)	± 3.6%	40%	49%	–	–	4%	2%	4%	9%
Morning Consult	Jul 3–5	12,000 (LV)	± 1%	42%	50%	–	–	3%	–	5%	8%
Morning Consult	Jun 29 – Jul 5	33,549 (RV)	± 2%	39%	48%	–	–	–	–	–	9%
HarrisX/The Hill	Jul 3–4	933 (RV)	± 3.2%	39%	43%	–	–	5%	5%	8%	4%
Research Co.	Jul 1–2	1,049 (LV)	± 3.0%	40%	49%	1%	–	2%	4%	4%	9%
Morning Consult	Jun 30 – Jul 2	12,000 (LV)	± 1%	42%	51%	–	–	3%	–	4%	9%
YouGov/Yahoo News	Jun 29 – Jul 1	1,187 (RV)	4.4%	40%	45%	–	–	4%	3%	9%	5%
Global Strategy Group/Data For Progress	Jun 23 – Jul 1	3,249 (RV)	–	39%	50%	–	2%	2% (Note: Jacob Hornberger)	–	4%	11%

=== May 3 – June 30, 2020 ===
Poll source	Date	Sample size	Margin of error	Donald Trump Republican	Joe Biden Democratic	Jo Jorgensen Libertarian	Howie Hawkins Green	Other	Undecided	Lead
Ipsos/Reuters	Jun 29–30	943 (RV)	± 3.6%	38%	46%	-	-	10% (Note: "Some other candidate" with 8%; would not vote with 2%)	6%	8%
YouGov/Economist	Jun 28–30	1,198 (RV)	± 3.4%	40%	49%	-	-	6% (Note: "Other" with 4%; would not vote with 2%)	4%	9%
IBD/TIPP	Jun 27–30	1,005 (RV)	± 3.1%	40%	48%	-	-	–	–	8%
Monmouth	Jun 26–30	359 (RV)	–	39%	52%	4% (Note: Listed as Jorgensen)	<1% (Note: Listed as Hawkins)	≈2-3% (Note: "Other candidate" with 2%; "no one" with <1%)	3%	13%
Monmouth	Jun 26–30	733 (RV)	± 3.6%	41% (Note: Response without naming third party candidates)	53%	-	-	4% (Note: "Some other candidate" with 4%; "no one" with 0%)	2%	12%
SurveyMonkey/Axios	Jun 8–30	65,085 (LV)	–	46%	51%	-	-	–	2%	5%
Morning Consult	Jun 27–29	12,000 (LV)	± 1%	43%	50%	-	-	3%	4%	7%
Suffolk University/USA Today	Jun 25–29	1,000 (RV)	± 3.1%	41%	53%	-	-	–	–	12%
Suffolk University/USA Today	Jun 25–29	1,000 (RV)	± 3.1%	37% (Note: With a third party option)	46%	-	-	11% (Note: "Third party candidate" with 11%)	6%	9%
Change Research/CNBC	Jun 26–28	1,663 (LV)	± 2.4%	41%	49%	5%	2%	1% (Note: Would not vote with 1%)	3%	8%
Hart Research Associates/Protect Our Care (Note: Poll sponsored by Protect Our Care, a pro-Affordable Care Act Organisation)	Jun 22–28	1,000 (LV)	–	41%	55%	-	-	1% (Note: "Third party candidate" with 1%)	3%	14%
Morning Consult	Jun 22–28	28,722 (RV)	± 1%	40%	47%	-	-	–	–	7%
PureSpectrum/COVID-19 Consortium	Jun 12–28	22,501 (LV)	–	39%	47%	-	-	–	–	8%
RMG Research/Scott Rasmussen	Jun 25–27	1,200 (RV)	–	39%	47%	-	-	6%	7%	8%
Optimus/Firehouse	Jun 23–27	903 (LV)	–	40.6%	44.8%	-	-	6.1% (Note: "Other candidate" with 5.6%; would not vote with 0.5%)	8.5%	4.2%
PPP/Giffords (Note: Giffords is a PAC which supports gun control measures)	Jun 25–26	996 (RV)	–	42%	53%	-	-	–	5%	11%
Morning Consult	Jun 24–26	12,000 (LV)	± 1%	42%	50%	-	-	2%	5%	8%
YouGov/Yahoo News	Jun 24–25	1,244 (RV)	–	39%	47%	-	-	5% (Note: "Other" with 4%; would not vote with 1%)	9%	8%
Marist College	Jun 22–24	1,515 (RV)	± 3.5%	44%	52%	-	-	3%	2%	8%
Opinium/The Guardian	Jun 19–24	1,215 (LV)	–	40%	52%	-	-	3%	4%	12%
Data for Progress	Jun 23	721 (RV)	–	44%	50%	-	-	5%	–	6%
HarrisX/The Hill	Jun 22–23	951 (RV)	± 3.18%	39%	43%	-	-	9% (Note: "Other" with 5%; would not vote with 4%)	9%	4%
Ipsos/Reuters	Jun 22–23	934 (RV)	± 3.7%	37%	47%	-	-	10%	6%	10%
Morning Consult	Jun 21–23	12,000 (LV)	± 1%	42%	50%	-	-	3%	5%	8%
YouGov/Economist	Jun 21–23	1,230 (RV)	± 3.3%	41%	49%	-	-	6%	5%	8%
CNBC/Hart Research/Public Opinion Strategies	Jun 19–22	800 (RV)	± 3.5%	38%	47%	-	-	–	–	9%
NYT Upshot/Siena College	Jun 17–22	1,337 (RV)	± 3%	36%	50%	-	-	5% (Note: "Another candidate" with 3%; Would not vote with 2%)	9%	14%
Pew Research Center	Jun 16–22	3,577 (RV)	± 2%	44%	54%	-	-	2% (Note: "Neither" with 2%)	–	10%
Morning Consult	Jun 15–21	30,942 (RV)	± 1%	39%	47%	-	-	–	–	8%
Morning Consult	Jun 18–20	12,000 (LV)	± 1%	42%	50%	-	-	3%	5%	8%
PPP/Protect Our Care	Jun 19–20	1,013 (V)	± 3.1%	43%	52%	-	-	–	6%	9%
Harvard-Harris	Jun 17–18	≈1,735 (LV) (Note: 92% of a sample of 1,886 registered voters)	–	44%	56%	-	-	–	–	12%
Morning Consult	Jun 15–17	12,000 (LV)	± 1%	42%	51%	-	-	3%	4%	9%
YouGov/Economist	Jun 14–16	1,160 (RV)	± 3.5%	41%	50%	-	-	5% (Note: "Other" with 3%; would not vote with 2%)	4%	9%
Fox News	Jun 13–16	1,343 (RV)	± 2.5%	38%	50%	-	-	7% (Note: "Other" with 5%; would not vote with 2%)	5%	12%
Axios/SurveyMonkey	Jun 12–16	5,666 (A)	–	42%	53%	-	-	4% (Note: "No answer" with 4%)	–	11%
Echelon Insights	Jun 12–16	1,000 (LV)	–	42%	50%	-	-	–	8%	8%
Ipsos/Reuters	Jun 10–16	3,768 (RV)	± 1.8%	35%	48%	-	-	10%	7%	13%
Optimus/Firehouse	Jun 9–16	686 (LV)	–	43.9%	50%	-	-	6.1% (Note: Would not vote with 6.1%)	–	6%
Quinnipiac	Jun 11–15	1,332 (RV)	± 2.7%	41%	49%	-	-	4% (Note: "Someone else" with 3%; would not vote with 1%)	5%	8%
Morning Consult	Jun 12–14	12,000 (LV)	± 1%	42%	50%	-	-	3%	5%	8%
Change Research/CNBC	Jun 12–14	1,250 (LV)	± 2.77%	41%	51%	3%	2%	0% (Note: Would not vote)	3%	10%
Kaiser Family Foundation	Jun 8–14	1,094 (RV)	± 4%	38%	51%	-	-	5% (Note: "Someone else" with 3%; would not vote and "refused" with 1%)	7%	13%
Morning Consult	Jun 8–14	32,138 (RV)	± 1%	39%	48%	-	-	–	–	9%
RMG Research/Scott Rasmussen/Just the News	Jun 11–13	1,200 (RV)	–	36%	48%	-	-	6%	9%	12%
Abacus Data	Jun 11–13	1,004 (LV)	–	41%	51%	-	-	–	–	10%
Firehouse/Optimus	Jun 6–13	742 (LV)	–	42.9%	51.6%	-	-	5.5% (Note: Would not vote with 5.5%)	–	8.7%
Morning Consult	Jun 9–11	12,000 (LV)	± 1%	42%	50%	-	-	3%	5%	8%
Climate Nexus	Jun 6–11	9,087 (RV)	± 1%	41%	48%	-	-	–	11%	7%
YouGov/Yahoo News	Jun 9–10	1,288 (RV)	–	40%	49%	-	-	5% (Note: "Third party candidate" with 4%; would not vote with 1%)	6%	9%
Democracy Fund & UCLA Nationscape/SurveyUSA	May 28 – Jun 10	10,601 (RV)	± 1.5%	39%	50%	-	-	–	–	11%
YouGov/Economist	Jun 7–9	1,241 (RV)	± 3.4%	41%	49%	-	-	5%	5%	8%
Ipsos/Reuters	Jun 8–9	931 (RV)	–	38%	46%	-	-	7%	9% (Note: Includes would not vote)	8%
Firehouse/Optimus	Jun 2–9	762 (LV)	–	42.2%	53%	-	-	4.8% (Note: Would not vote with 4.8%)	–	11%
Redfield & Wilton Strategies	Jun 2–9	1,500 (LV)	–	37%	50%	1%	0%	1%	10%	13%
Morning Consult	Jun 6–8	12,000 (LV)	± 1%	42%	51%	-	-	3%	4%	9%
MSR Group	Jun 7	855 (RV)	± 3.1%	38.9%	46.3%	-	-	7.3% (Note: "Neither/other" with 7.3%)	7.5%	7.3%
Morning Consult	Jun 1–7	32,380 (RV)	± 1%	39%	47%	-	-	–	–	8%
Firehouse/Optimus	Jun 4–6	787 (LV)	–	41.9%	53.1%	-	-	5% (Note: Would not vote with 5%)	–	11.2%
Scott Rasmussen/RMG Research	Jun 4–6	1,200 (RV)	–	37%	47%	-	-	9% (Note: "Some other candidate" with 9%)	7%	10%
Garin-Hart-Yang/Senate Majority PAC/Priorities USA (Note: This poll was sponsored by the Senate Majority PAC, which supports Democratic Senate candidates, and Priorities USA, a Democratic super PAC)	Jun 3–6	1,223 (LV)	–	41%	53%	-	-	–	–	12%
Morning Consult	Jun 3–5	12,000 (LV)	± 1%	43%	49%	-	-	3%	5%	6%
CNN/SSRS	Jun 2–5	1,125 (RV)	± 3.6%	41%	55%	-	-	3% (Note: "Other" with 1%; "neither" with 2%)	2%	14%
NORC/AEI	May 21 – Jun 5	3,504 (A)	± 2.3%	32%	40%	-	-	19% (Note: Would not vote with 13%; "Third party candidate" with 6%)	9%	8%
Whitman Insight Strategies	Jun 2–4	500 (RV)	–	43%	53%	-	-	1%	2%	10%
HarrisX/The Hill	Jun 1–4	2,827 (RV)	± 1.8%	37%	47%	-	-	8% (Note: "Other" and would not vote with 4%)	8%	10%
Marist College	Jun 2–3	958 (RV)	± 4.0%	43%	50%	-	-	2%	5%	7%
Emerson College	Jun 2–3	1,431 (RV)	± 2.5%	47%	53%	-	-	–	–	6%
Civiqs/Daily Kos	Jun 1–3	1,327 (A)	± 2.8%	44%	47%	-	-	7% (Note: "Someone else" with 7%)	3%	3%
IBD/TIPP	May 31 – Jun 3	964 (RV)	–	42%	45%	-	-	–	–	13%
Data for Progress	Jun 2	688 (RV)	–	40.2%	53.58%	-	-	6.22% (Note: "A different candidate" with 6.22%)	–	13.4%
Zogby Analytics	Jun 1–2	1,007 (LV)	± 3.1%	46%	46%	-	-	–	8%	Tie
Ipsos/Reuters	Jun 1–2	964 (RV)	–	37%	47%	-	-	–	–	10%
Research Co.	Jun 1–2	1,000 (A)	± 3.1%	41%	46%	2%	–	1%	10%	5%
YouGov/Economist	May 31 – Jun 2	1,244 (RV)	± 3.2%	40%	47%	-	-	8% (Note: "Other" with 5%; would not vote with 3%)	5%	7%
Morning Consult	May 31 – Jun 2	12,000 (LV)	± 1%	43%	49%	-	-	3%	5%	6%
NBC/WSJ	May 28 – Jun 2	1,000 (RV)	± 3.1%	42%	49%	-	-	5%	4%	7%
Firehouse/Optimus	May 26 – Jun 2	795 (LV)	–	44.4%	50.9%	-	-	4.7% (Note: Would not vote with 4.7%)	–	6.5%
Morning Consult	May 31 – Jun 1	1,624 (RV)	± 2%	39%	51%	-	-	–	10%	12%
YouGov/CBS News	May 29 – Jun 1	1,486 (LV)	–	43%	47%	-	-	4% (Note: "Someone else/third party" with 4%; would not vote with 0%)	5%	4%
Monmouth	May 28 – Jun 1	742 (RV)	± 3.6%	41%	52%	-	-	6% (Note: "Other" with 5%; "no one" with 1%)	1%	11%
Change Research/CNBC	May 29–31	1,457 (LV)	± 2.567%	41%	48%	3%	3%	1%	4%	7%
Morning Consult	May 25–31	31,983 (RV)	± 1%	41%	46%	-	-	–	–	5%
PureSpectrum/COVID-19 Consortium	May 16–31	18,132 (LV)	–	37%	46%	-	-	–	–	9%
Morning Consult	May 28–30	12,000 (LV)	± 1%	44%	49%	-	-	3%	5%	5%
YouGov/Yahoo News	May 29–30	861 (RV)	–	40%	48%	-	-	6% (Note: "Third party candidate" with 5%; would not vote with 1%)	5%	8%
RMG Research/Scott Rasmussen/Just the News	May 28–30	1,200 (RV)	–	39%	46%	-	-	7%	8%	7%
Firehouse/Optimus	May 21–30	789 (LV)	–	45.4%	49.7%	-	-	4.9% (Note: Would not vote with 4.9%)	–	4.3%
ABC News/Washington Post	May 25–28	835 (RV)	± 4%	43%	53%	-	-	2% (Note: "Other" and "Neither" with 1%; would not vote with 0%)	1%	10%
Morning Consult	May 25–27	12,000 (LV)	± 1%	44%	48%	-	-	3%	5%	4%
TargetSmart	May 21–27	1,200 (RV)	± 2.8%	40%	43%	-	-	9% (Note: "Other candidate" with 6%; would not vote with 3%)	8%	3%
Ipsos/Reuters	May 20–27	3,732 (RV)	± 1.8%	39%	45%	-	-	8% (Note: "Some other candidate" with 6%; would not vote with 2%)	7%	6%
Data for Progress	May 26	686 (RV)	–		49.81%	-	-	4.52% (Note: "A different candidate" with 4.52%)	–	3.14%
Zogby/EMI/Washington Examiner	May 26	1,001 (LV)	± 3.2%	40%	53%	-	-	–	–	13%
YouGov/Economist	May 23–26	1,153 (RV)	± 3.4%	42%	45%	-	-	8%	6%	3%
Firehouse/Optimus	May 19–26	793 (LV)	–	44.1%	51.8%	-	-	4.1% (Note: Would not vote with 4.1%)	–	7.7%
Morning Consult	May 22–24	12,000 (LV)	± 1%	44%	48%	-	-	3%	5%	4%
Morning Consult	May 18–24	30,317 (RV)	± 1%	41%	46%	-	-	–	–	5%
Firehouse/Optimus	May 16–23	766 (LV)	–	42.7%	53.9%	-	-	3.4% (Note: Would not vote with 3.4%)	–	11.2%
YouGov/Yahoo News	May 20–21	1,218 (RV)	–	42%	46%	-	-	6% (Note: "Third party candidate" with 4%; would not vote with 2%)	6%	4%
Morning Consult	May 19–21	12,000 (LV)	± 1%	44%	49%	-	-	3%	5%	5%
Echelon Insights	May 18–20	1,000 (LV)	–	42%	51%	-	-	–	7%	9%
Fox News	May 17–20	1,207 (RV)	± 2.5%	40%	48%	-	-	6%	5%	8%
Data for Progress/Harvard	May 19	810 (RV)	–	42%	51%	-	-	–	–	9%
Ipsos/Reuters	May 18–19	957 (RV)	± 3.6%	38%	47%	-	-	7% (Note: "Some other candidate" with 5%; would not vote with 2%)	7%	9%
Rasmussen Reports/Pulse Opinion Research	May 18–19	1,000 (LV)	± 3%	43%	48%	-	-	–	8%	5%
YouGov/Economist	May 17–19	1,235 (RV)	± 3.2%	42%	47%	-	-	6%	5%	5%
Firehouse/Optimus	May 12–19	774 (LV)	–	41.5%	51.5%	-	-	7% (Note: Would not vote with 7%)	–	10.0%
Morning Consult	May 16–18	12,000 (LV)	± 1%	44%	49%	-	-	3%	5%	5%
Quinnipiac	May 14–18	1,323 (RV)	± 2.7%	39%	50%	-	-	4% (Note: "Someone else" with 2%; would not vote with 2%)	7%	11%
Kaiser Family Foundation	May 13–18	970 (RV)	± 4%	41%	43%	-	-	5% (Note: "Refused" with 3%; "someone else" and would not vote with 1%)	12%	2%
Change Research/CNBC	May 15–17	1,424 (LV)	± 2.6%	45%	48%	3%	3%	0%	2%	3%
Morning Consult	May 11–17	28,159 (RV)	± 1%	41%	46%	-	-	–	–	5%
Scott Rasmussen/RMG Research/Just the News	May 14–16	1,200 (RV)	–	39%	43%	-	-	8% (Note: Amash with 3%; "Other" with 5%)	9%	4%
Firehouse/Optimus	May 9–16	780 (LV)	–	41.4%	51.6%	-	-	7%	–	10.2%
Morning Consult	May 13–15	12,000 (LV)	± 1%	43%	49%	-	-	3%	5%	6%
PureSpectrum/COVID-19 Consortium	May 2–15	20,333 (LV)	–	39%	43%	-	-	–	–	4%
HarrisX/The Hill	May 13–14	950 (RV)	± 3.18%	41%	42%	-	-	9%	9%	1%
Harvard-Harris	May 13–14	1,708 (LV)	–	47%	53%	-	-	–	–	6%
Data for Progress/Harvard	May 12	684 (RV)	–	41%	48%	-	-	–	–	7%
Ipsos/Reuters	May 11–12	973 (RV)	–	38%	46%	-	-	–	–	8%
YouGov/Economist	May 10–12	1,175 (RV)	± 3.4%	43%	47%	-	-	6%	5%	4%
Morning Consult	May 10–12	12,000 (LV)	± 1%	45%	48%	-	-	3%	5%	3%
Firehouse/Optimus	May 5–12	728 (LV)	–	43.3%	52%	-	-	4.7%	–	9%
CNN/SSRS	May 7–10	1,001 (RV)	± 4%	46%	51%	-	-	2% (Note: "Other" and "neither" with 1%)	1%	5%
Morning Consult	May 4–10	27,754 (RV)	± 1%	42%	45%	-	-	–	13%	3%
Redfield and Wilton Strategies	May 8–9	1,384 (LV)	–	40%	47%	-	-	4% (Note: "Third party/write-in" with 4%; would not vote with no voters)	9%	7%
Redfield and Wilton Strategies	May 8–9	1,408 (LV)	–	39% (Note: Voting intention for an exclusively vote-by-mail election)	48%	-	-	4%	9%	9%
Morning Consult	May 7–9	12,000 (LV)	± 1%	44%	48%	-	-	3%	4%	4%
Scott Rasmussen/RMG Research	May 7–9	1,200 (RV)	–	38%	44%	-	-	7%	10%	6%
Firehouse/Optimus	May 2–9	726 (LV)	–	44.5%	50%	-	-	5.5%	–	5%
HarrisX/The Hill	May 6	957 (RV)	± 3.17%	41%	41%	-	-	9%	9%	Tie
Morning Consult	May 4–6	12,000 (LV)	± 1%	44%	49%	-	-	3%	4%	5%
Data for Progress/Harvard	May 5	795 (RV)	–	44%	50%	-	-	–	–	6%
YouGov/Yahoo News	May 4–5	1,224 (RV)	–	42%	45%	-	-	7% (Note: "Third party candidate" with 5%; would not vote with 2%)	6%	3%
Ipsos/Reuters	May 4–5	1,015 (RV)	± 3.5%	41%	43%	-	-	9% (Note: "Some other candidate" with 7%; would not vote with 2%)	6%	2%
YouGov/Economist	May 3–5	1,206 (RV)	± 3.3%	42%	46%	-	-	7% (Note: "Other" with 4%; would not vote with 3%)	5%	4%
Civiqs/Daily Kos	May 2–5	1,546 (A)	± 2.5%	44%	47%	-	-	7%	2%	3%
Firehouse/Optimus	Apr 28 – May 5	758 (LV)	–	45%	51%	-	-	4% (Note: Would not vote with 4%)	–	6%
Monmouth University	Apr 30 – May 4	739 (RV)	± 3.6%	41%	50%	-	-	4% (Note: "Other candidate" with 3%; "no one" with 1%)	5%	9%
Monmouth University	Apr 30 – May 4	739 (RV)	± 3.6%	40% (Note: With Justin Amash)	47%	-	-	7% (Note: Justin Amash with 5%; "Other candidate" with 1%; "no one" with 1%)	6%	7%
Morning Consult	May 2–3	1,991 (RV)	± 2%	41%	45%	-	-	3% (Note: Would not vote with 3%)	11%	4%
Change Research/CNBC	May 1–3	1,489 (LV)	± 2.54%	44%	47%	-	-	7% (Note: "Third party candidate" with 6%; would not vote with 1%)	2%	3%
Morning Consult	Apr 27 – May 3	31,117 (RV)	–	42%	46%	-	-	–	–	4%

=== Jan 1 – May 2, 2020 ===
Poll source	Date	Sample size	Margin of error	Donald Trump Republican	Joe Biden Democratic	Other	Undecided	Lead
Scott Rasmussen/RMG Research	Apr 30 – May 2, 2020	1,200 (RV)	–	39%	46%	7%	8%	7%
Firehouse/Optimus	Apr 25 – May 2, 2020	765 (LV)	–	45.3%	49.5%	5.2% (Note: Would not vote with 5.2%)	–	4.2%
YouGov/CBS News	Apr 28 – May 1, 2020	1,671 (LV)	–	43%	49%	4%	4%	6%
PureSpectrum/COVID-19 Consortium	Apr 16–30, 2020	19,505 (LV)	–	40%	44%	–	–	4%
Ipsos/Reuters	Apr 27–29, 2020	1,876 (RV)	± 2.6%	39%	45%	9% (Note: "Other" with 7%; would not vote with 2%)	7%	6%
IBD/TIPP	Apr 26–29, 2020	948 (RV)	–	43%	43%	–	–	Tie
Data for Progress/Harvard	Apr 28, 2020	895 (RV)	–	43%	52%	–	–	9%
YouGov/Economist	Apr 26–28, 2020	1,222 (RV)	± 3.2%	41%	47%	6%	6%	6%
Emerson College	Apr 26–28, 2020	1,200 (RV)	–	46%	54%	–	–	7.4%
Firehouse/Optimus	Apr 21–28, 2020	766 (LV)	–	45.3%	49.2%	5.5%	–	3.9%
Morning Consult	Apr 20–26, 2020	30,560 (RV)	± 1%	42%	46%	–	–	4%
Scott Rasmussen/RMG Research	Apr 23–25, 2020	1,200 (RV)	–	38%	46%	6%	9%	6%
Suffolk University/USA Today	Apr 21–25, 2020	1,000 (RV)	–	38%	44%	10% (Note: "Third party candidate" with 8%; "refused" with 1%)	9%	6%
Firehouse/Optimus	Apr 18–25, 2020	784 (LV)	–	44%	52%	4%	–	8%
Redfield & Wilton Strategies	Apr 23, 2020	1,362 (LV)	–	40%	49%	2% (Note: "Would vote for a third party/write-in candidate" with 2%; would not vote with no voters)	9%	9%
Data for Progress/Harvard	Apr 21, 2020	860 (RV)	–	44%	49%	–	–	5%
YouGov/Economist	Apr 19–21, 2020	1,142 (RV)	± 3.4%	42%	48%	5%	5%	6%
Echelon Insights	Apr 18–21, 2020	1,000 (LV)	–	43%	52%	–	5%	9%
Ipsos/Reuters	Apr 15–21, 2020	3,806 (RV)	± 1.8%	39%	47%	8%	7%	8%
Firehouse/Optimus	Apr 14–21, 2020	829 (LV)	–	44.3%	52.7%	–	3%	8.4%
HarrisX/The Hill	Apr 19–20, 2020	958 (RV)	± 3.17%	40%	42%	9%	9%	2%
Fordham University	Apr 16–20, 2020	862 (RV)	± 4.33%	42%	56%	–	3%	14%
Climate Nexus	Apr 19, 2020	1,917 (RV)	± 2.3%	40%	49%	–	10%	9%
Morning Consult	Apr 13–19, 2020	31,482 (RV)	± 1%	42%	47%	–	–	5%
Change Research/CNBC	Apr 17–18, 2020	1,178 (LV)	± 2.9%	44%	48%	6% (Note: "Third party candidate" with 6%; would not vote with 0%)	1%	4%
Scott Rasmussen/RMG Research/Just the News Daily Poll	Apr 16–18, 2020	1,000 (RV)	± 2.8%	40%	49%	5%	6%	9%
Firehouse/Optimus	Apr 11–18, 2020	745 (LV)	–	44.3%	52.2%	3.5% (Note: Would not vote with 3.5%)	–	7.9%
Harvard-Harris	Apr 14–16, 2020	2,190 (LV)	–	47%	53%	–	–	6%
Morning Consult	Apr 14–16, 2020	1,992 (RV)	± 2.0%	42%	46%	12% (Note: Justin Amash with 1%; "Someone else" with 5%; Would not vote with 6%)	–	4%
Morning Consult	Apr 14–16, 2020	1,992 (RV)	± 2.0%	43%	47%	10% (Note: "Someone else" with 5%; Would not vote with 5%)	-	4%
NBC News/Wall Street Journal	Apr 13–15, 2020	900 (RV)	± 3.27%	42%	49%	5%	4%	7%
Change Research	Apr 13–15, 2020	1,349 (LV)	± 3.4%	40% (Note: Vote shares listed as proportion of decided voters for candidate X + proportion of leaners for candidate X * proportion of voters who are leaners)	51%	7%	2%	11%
Democracy Fund & UCLA Nationscape	Apr 9–15, 2020	5,036 (RV)	–	43%	48%	–	–	5%
Data for Progress/Harvard	Apr 14, 2020	802 (RV)	–	45%	49%	–	–	4%
Ipsos/Reuters	Apr 13–14, 2020	937 (RV)	± 4.0%	40%	45%	–	–	5%
YouGov/Economist	Apr 12–14, 2020	1,160 (RV)	± 3.4%	43%	48%	5%	4%	5%
Civiqs	Apr 11–14, 2020	1,600 (A)	± 2.6%	44%	48%	6%	2%	4%
Firehouse/Optimus	Apr 7–14, 2020	732 (LV)	–	42.1%	53.9%	4%	–	11.8%
Pew Research Center	Apr 8–12, 2020	4,208 (RV)	± 2.2%	45%	47%	8%	–	2%
Morning Consult	Apr 6–12, 2020	25,372 (RV)	± 1%	42%	45%	–	–	3%
Global Strategy Group/314 Action Fund (Note: The 314 Action Fund is a PAC which supports the election of scientists)	Apr 6–10, 2020	1,002 (LV)	± 3.1%	45%	49%	–	6%	4%
Firehouse/Optimus	Apr 4–10, 2020	814 (LV)	–	43.3%	52.8%	4%	–	9.5%
YouGov/Yahoo News	Apr 6–7, 2020	1,139 (RV)	–	40%	49%	6%	5%	9%
Ipsos/Reuters	Apr 6–7, 2020	959 (RV)	–	37%	43%	–	–	6%
YouGov/Economist	Apr 5–7, 2020	1,144 (RV)	± 3.1%	42%	48%	6%	4%	6%
Fox News	Apr 4–7, 2020	1,107 (RV)	± 3.0%	42%	42%	7%	6%	Tie
Climate Nexus	Apr 3–7, 2020	3,168 (RV)	–	41%	47%	–	–	6%
Monmouth University	Apr 3–7, 2020	743 (RV)	± 3.6%	44%	48%	6% (Note: "Other candidate" with 5%; "No one" with 1%)	3%	4%
CNN/SSRS	Apr 3–6, 2020	875 (RV)	± 3.9%	42%	53%	2% (Note: "Other" with 0%; “neither” with 2%)	3%	11%
Hart Research/Public; Opinion Strategies/CNBC	Apr 3–6, 2020	604 (RV)	–	39%	44%	4% (Note: "Neither/other" with 4%)	13% (Note: "Not sure" with 9%; "Depends" with 4%)	5%
Quinnipiac University	Apr 2–6, 2020	2,077 (RV)	± 2.2%	41%	49%	5% (Note: "Someone else" with 3%; Would not vote with 2%)	5%	8%
Hart Research Associates/Protect Our Care (Note: The poll's sponsor is a pro-Affordable Care Act organisation)	Apr 3–5, 2020	1,015 (RV)	–	43%	51%	2% (Note: "Third party candidate" with 2%)	4%	8%
Morning Consult	Mar 30 – Apr 5, 2020	30,985 (RV)	± 1%	42%	46%	–	12%	4%
Firehouse/Optimus	Mar 28 – Apr 4, 2020	937 (LV)	–	43.8%	50.2%	6% (Note: Would not vote with 6%)	–	6.4%
Research Co.	Apr 3, 2020	1,000 (A)	± 3.1%	44%	50%	6%	–	6%
Change Research	Apr 2–3, 2020	1,200 (LV)	–	45%	43%	9% (Note: "Other" with 9%; would not vote with 0%)	2%	2%
IBD/TIPP	Mar 29 – Apr 1, 2020	980 (RV)	–	41%	47%	6% (Note: "Other" with 5%; "prefer not to answer" with 1%)	7%	6%
Ipsos/Reuters	Mar 30–31, 2020	930 (RV)	–	40%	46%	–	–	6%
YouGov/Economist	Mar 29–31, 2020	1,194 (RV)	± 3.2%	42%	46%	7%	6%	4%
Selzer & Co./Grinnell College	Mar 27–30, 2020	777 (LV)	± 3.5%	43%	47%	8%	1%	4%
Morning Consult	Mar 23–29, 2020	34,645 (RV)	± 1%	42%	46%	–	12%	4%
YouGov	Mar 26–28, 2020	1,193 (RV)	± 3.2%	42%	46%	4%	6%	4%
Change Research	Mar 26–28, 2020	1,845 (LV)	± 3.3%	42%	47%	–	11%	5%
Scott Rasmussen/RMG	Mar 26–28, 2020	1,000 (RV)	–	40%	45%	–	–	5%
Firehouse/Optimus	Mar 21–28, 2020	1,032 (LV)	–	42.8%	51.1%	6.1%	–	8.3%
YouGov/Yahoo News	Mar 25–26, 2020	1,579 (A)	± 3.1%	40%	46%	5% (Note: "Third party candidate" with 3%; would not vote with 2%)	8%	6%
Zogby Analytics	Mar 24–26, 2020	889 (LV)	–	45%	46%	–	9%	1%
Harvard-Harris	Mar 24–26, 2020	2,410 (RV)	–	45%	55%	–	–	10%
ABC News/Washington Post	Mar 22–25, 2020	845 (RV)	± 3.5%	47%	49%	2%	1%	2%
YouGov/Economist	Mar 22–24, 2020	1,167 (RV)	± 3.4%	42%	46%	6%	6%	4%
Fox News	Mar 21–24, 2020	1,011 (RV)	± 3.0%	40%	49%	5%	4%	9%
Echelon Insights	Mar 20–24, 2020	1,000 (LV)	–	41%	51%	–	8%	10%
Ipsos/Reuters	Mar 18–24, 2020	3,763 (RV)	–	39%	46%	–	–	7%
Lord Ashcroft Polls	Mar 10–24, 2020	10,357 (A)	–	36%	48%	9% (Note: Would not vote with 9%)	7%	12%
Redfield & Wilton Strategies	Mar 23, 2020	1,500 (LV)	± 2.57%	40% (Note: Percentages calculated as listed percentage in sample without undecided voters * Percentage of voters who are not undecided)	48%	4% (Note: "Would vote for a third party/write-in candidate" with 4%)	8%	8%
Monmouth University	Mar 18–22, 2020	754 (RV)	± 3.6%	45%	48%	3%	4%	3%
Morning Consult	Mar 16–22, 2020	36,272 (RV)	± 1%	42%	47%	–	12%	5%
Emerson College	Mar 18–19, 2020	1,100 (RV)	± 2.9%	47%	53%	–	–	6%
YouGov/Economist	Mar 15–17, 2020	1,129 (RV)	± 3.5%	41%	48%	6%	5%	7%
Ipsos/Reuters	Mar 13–16, 2020	955 (RV)	± 3.6%	37%	46%	11% (Note: "Neither/other" with 7%; would not vote with 4%)	6% (Note: Listed as "don't know/refused")	9%
Hart Research & Associates/Protect Our Care (Note: This poll's sponsor, Protect Our Care, is a pro-Affordable Care Act organisation)	Mar 13–15, 2020	1,015 (RV)	–	43%	51%	2%	4%	8%
Morning Consult	Mar 11–15, 2020	9,979 (RV)	± 1%	42%	48%	–	11%	6%
NBC News/Wall Street Journal	Mar 11–13, 2020	900 (RV)	± 3.3%	43%	52%	3%	2%	9%
YouGov/Hofstra University	Mar 5–12, 2020	1,500 (LV)	± 2.9%	49%	51%	–	–	2%
YouGov	Mar 10–11, 2020	1,240 (RV)	–	41%	45%	7% (Note: "Third party candidate" with 4%; would not vote with 3%)	6%	4%
Civiqs	Mar 8–11, 2020	1,441 (RV)	± 2.7%	46%	48%	–	6%	2%
GS Strategy Group/Patients for Affordable Drugs Now	Mar 7–11, 2020	1,000 (LV)	± 3.1%	42%	48%	–	10%	6%
YouGov	Mar 8–10, 2020	1,191 (RV)	± 2.9%	43%	47%	5% (Note: "Other" with 2%; would not vote with 3%)	5%	4%
Ipsos/Reuters	Mar 6–9, 2020	956 (RV)	± 3.6%	42%	44%	10% (Note: "Neither/other" with 8%; Would not vote with 2%)	5%	2%
Quinnipiac University	Mar 5–8, 2020	1,261 (RV)	± 2.8%	41%	52%	3% (Note: "Someone else" with 1%; Would not vote with 2%)	5%	11%
Rasmussen Reports	Mar 5–8, 2020	1,000 (RV)	± 3%	42%	48%	–	9%	6%
Morning Consult	Mar 5–8, 2020	6,112 (RV)	± 1%	42%	46%	–	12%	4%
CNN/SSRS	Mar 4–7, 2020	1,084 (RV)	± 3.5%	43%	53%	1% (Note: "Other" with 0%; "neither" with 1%)	2%	10%
IBD/TIPP	Feb 20–29, 2020	839 (RV)	–	46%	49%	2% (Note: "Other" with 1%; "refused" with 1%)	2%	3%
Harvard-Harris	Feb 26–28, 2020	651 (RV)	–	45%	55%	–	–	10%
YouGov/Yahoo News	Feb 26–27, 2020	1,662 (RV)	–	41%	50%	6%	3%	9%
Morning Consult	Feb 23–27, 2020	6,117 (RV)	± 1%	42%	46%	–	12%	4%
Fox News	Feb 23–26, 2020	1,000 (RV)	± 3.0%	41%	49%	6% (Note: "Other" with 2%; would not vote with 4%)	4%	8%
Ipsos/Reuters	Feb 19–25, 2020	3,809 (RV)	± 1.8%	40%	47%	–	–	7%
YouGov/CBS News	Feb 20–22, 2020	10,000 (RV)	± 1.2%	45%	47%	5% (Note: "Someone else/third party" with 4%; would not vote with 1%)	4%	2%
Saint Leo University	Feb 17–22, 2020	1,000 (A)	± 3%	39.4%	46.8%	–	13.8%	7.4%
Emerson College	Feb 16–18, 2020	1,250 (RV)	± 2.7%	52%	48%	–	–	4%
ABC News/Washington Post	Feb 14–17, 2020	913 (RV)	± 4%	45%	52%	3% (Note: "Other" with 0%; "Neither" with 2%; would not vote with 1%)	1%	7%
NBC News/Wall Street Journal	Feb 14–17, 2020	900 (RV)	± 3.3%	44%	52%	–	–	8%
Ipsos/Reuters	Feb 14–17, 2020	947 (RV)	± 3.6%	40%	42%	12% (Note: "Neither/other" with 10%; would not vote with 2%)	6%	2%
SurveyUSA	Feb 13–17, 2020	2,768 (RV)	± 1.9%	45%	48%	–	7%	3%
Morning Consult	Feb 12–17, 2020	7,313 (RV)	± 1%	42%	46%	–	12%	4%
NPR/PBS News/Marist College	Feb 13–16, 2020	1,164 (RV)	± 3.7%	44%	50%	1%	5%	6%
Zogby Analytics	Feb 13–14, 2020	1,340 (LV)	–	46%	46%	–	8%	Tie
Ipsos/Reuters	Feb 7–10, 2020	952 (RV)	± 3.6%	42%	44%	11% (Note: "Neither/other" with 8%; would not vote with 3%)	4%	2%
Quinnipiac University	Feb 5–9, 2020	1,519 (RV)	± 2.5%	43%	50%	5% (Note: "Someone else" with 2%; Would not vote with 3%)	2%	7%
Morning Consult	Feb 4–9, 2020	36,180 (RV)	± 1%	42%	45%	–	13%	3%
Zogby Analytics	Jan 31 – Feb 2, 2020	908 (LV)	–	46%	46%	–	8%	Tie
Atlas Intel	Jan 30 – Feb 2, 2020	1,600 (RV)	± 2%	45.4%	45.8%	–	8.8%	0.4%
Morning Consult	Jan 27 – Feb 2, 2020	7,178 (RV)	± 1%	42%	46%	–	12%	4%
IBD/TIPP (Note: Sample size for registered voters sourced from FiveThirtyEight)	Jan 23–30, 2020	856 (RV)	–	48%	49%	2%	2%	1%
NBC News/Wall Street Journal	Jan 26–29, 2020	1,000 (RV)	± 3.1%	44%	50%	4%	2%	6%
USC Dornlife/LA Times	Jan 15–28, 2020	4,869 (RV)	± 2%	40%	49%	6% (Note: "Some other party's candidate" with 6%)	5%	9%
Morning Consult	Jan 20–26, 2020	8,399 (RV)	± 1%	41%	47%	–	13%	6%
Emerson College	Jan 21–23, 2020	1,128 (RV)	± 2.8%	50%	50%	–	–	Tie
ABC News/Washington Post	Jan 20–23, 2020	880 (RV)	± 4%	46%	50%	3%	1%	4%
Echelon Insights	Jan 20–23, 2020	1,000 (LV)	–	40%	49%	–	10%	9%
Fox News	Jan 19–22, 2020	1,005 (RV)	± 3%	41%	50%	8% (Note: "Other" with 6%; would not vote with 2%)	2%	9%
CNN/SSRS	Jan 16–19, 2020	1,051 (RV)	± 3.6%	44%	53%	1%	1%	9%
Morning Consult	Jan 15–19, 2020	5,944 (RV)	± 1%	41%	46%	–	13%	5%
Zogby Analytics	Jan 15–16, 2020	882 (LV)	–	46%	46%	–	8%	Tie
SurveyUSA	Jan 14–16, 2020	4,069 (RV)	± 1.7%	43%	50%	–	7%	7%
Morning Consult	Jan 6–12, 2020	8,299 (RV)	± 1%	41%	46%	–	13%	5%
IBD/TIPP	Jan 3–11, 2020	901 (RV)	± 3.3%	46%	48%	3% (Note: "Other" with 2%; "refused" with 1%)	2%	2%
Morning Consult	Dec 30, 2019 – Jan 5, 2020	8,436 (RV)	± 1%	40%	46%	–	14%	6%

=== 2017–2019 ===
Poll source	Date	Sample size	Margin of error	Donald Trump Republican	Joe Biden Democratic	Other	Undecided	Lead
Meeting Street Insights	Dec 28–30, 2019	1,000 (RV)	–	38%	49%	–	–	11%
Ipsos/Reuters	Dec 18–19, 2019	1,117 (A)	± 3.3%	35%	39%	17% (Note: "Neither/other" with 10%; Would not vote with 7%)	9%	4%
Ipsos/Reuters	Dec 18–19, 2019	1,108 (A)	± 3.4%	36%	37%	20% (Note: "Neither/other" with 12%; Would not vote with 8%)	8%	1%
Emerson College	Dec 15–17, 2019	1,222 (RV)	± 2.7%	48%	52%	–	–	4%
CNN/SSRS	Dec 12–15, 2019	1,005 (RV)	± 3.7%	44%	49%	1%	3%	5%
IBD/TIPP	Dec 6–14, 2019	905 (RV)	± 3.3%	45%	50%	3%	2%	5%
Fox News	Dec 8–11, 2019	1,000 (RV)	± 3.0%	41%	48%	2%	4%	7%
Quinnipiac	Dec 4–9, 2019	1,553 (RV)	± 2.5%	42%	51%	4%	3%	9%
Zogby Analytics	Dec 5–8, 2019	865 (LV)	± 3.3%	46%	45%	–	–	1%
SurveyUSA	Nov 20–21, 2019	3,850 (RV)	± 1.7%	39%	52%	–	9%	13%
RealClear Opinion Research	Nov 15–21, 2019	2,055 (RV)	± 2.38%	39%	51%	–	10%	12%
Emerson College	Nov 17–20, 2019	1,092 (RV)	± 2.9%	51%	49%	–	–	2%
Morning Consult	Nov 8, 2019	1,300 (RV)	± 3%	40%	44%	–	16%	4%
YouGov/Hofstra University	Oct 25–31, 2019	1,500 (LV)	± 3%	48.5%	51.5%	–	–	3.0%
ABC/Washington Post	Oct 27–30, 2019	876 (RV)	± 4%	39%	56%	4% (Note: "Other" with 0%; "neither" with 2%; would not vote with 2%)	0%	17%
FOX News	Oct 27–30, 2019	1,040 (RV)	± 3%	39%	51%	7%	4%	12%
IBD/TIPP	Oct 27–30, 2019	903 (A)	± 3.3%	41%	51%	–	–	10%
NBC News/Wall Street Journal	Oct 27–30, 2019	720 (RV)	± 3.7%	41%	50%	6% (Note: "Neither/other" with 6%)	3%	9%
Morning Consult/Politico	Oct 25–28, 2019	1,997 (RV)	± 2%	36%	41%	–	23%	5%
Emerson College	Oct 18–21, 2019	1,000 (RV)	± 3.0%	49%	51%	–	–	2%
CNN/SSRS	Oct 17–20, 2019	892 (RV)	± 4.0%	43%	53%	2%	1% (Note: Listed as "no opinion")	10%
Ipsos/Reuters	Oct 17–18, 2019	945 (RV)	± 3.6%	38%	47%	9% (Note: "Neither/other" with 6%; would not vote with 3%)	6%	9%
SurveyUSA	Oct 15–16, 2019	3,080 (RV)	± 2.1%	41%	52%	–	7%	11%
Lord Ashcroft Polls	Oct 1–15, 2019	15,051 (A)	–	41%	59%	–	–	18%
Fox News	Oct 6–8, 2019	1,003 (RV)	± 3.0%	40%	50%	5%	2%	10%
Quinnipiac University	Oct 4–7, 2019	1,483 (RV)	± 3.1%	40%	51%	2%	4%	11%
Zogby Analytics	Oct 1–3, 2019	887 (LV)	± 3.3%	47%	45%	–	8%	2%
IBD/TIPP	Sep 26 – Oct 3, 2019	863 (RV)	± 3.5%	44%	51%	1%	3%	7%
HarrisX	Oct 1–2, 2019	1,000 (RV)	–	35%	44%	11% (Note: "Other" with 5%; would not vote with 6%)	10%	9%
Ipsos/Reuters	Sep 26–30, 2019	1,917 (RV)	± 2.6%	36%	43%	11%	8%	7%
Rasmussen Reports	Sep 23–24, 2019	1,000 (LV)	± 3.0%	47%	43%	–	–	4%
Ipsos/Reuters	Sep 23–24, 2019	876 (RV)	± 3.8%	36%	42%	12%	8%	6%
Emerson College	Sep 21–23, 2019	1,019 (RV)	± 3.0%	49%	50%	–	–	1%
Zogby Analytics	Sep 16–17, 2019	1,004 (LV)	± 3.1%	44%	49%	–	8%	5%
Fox News	Sep 15–17, 2019	1,008 (RV)	± 3.0%	38%	52%	5%	2%	14%
SurveyUSA	Sep 13–16, 2019	4,520 (RV)	± 1.6%	41%	49%	–	10%	8%
Marquette University Law School	Sep 3–13, 2019	1,244 (A)	–	35% (Note: 7% said they'd probably (as opposed to definitely) vote for Trump)	45% (Note: 12% said they'd probably (as opposed to definitely) vote for Biden)	20% (Note: "Someone else" with 13%; Would not vote with 6%; no answer with 1%)	– (Note: See Biden and Trump notes)	10%
ABC News/Washington Post	Sep 2–5, 2019	877 (RV)	± 4.0%	40%	55%	–	1%	15%
IBD/TIPP	Aug 22–30, 2019	848 (RV)	± 3.5%	42%	54%	1%	3%	12%
Emerson College	Aug 24–26, 2019	1,458 (RV)	± 2.5%	46%	54%	–	–	8%
Quinnipiac University	Aug 21–26, 2019	1,422 (RV)	± 3.1%	38%	54%	1%	4%	16%
Morning Consult	Aug 16–18, 2019	1,998 (RV)	± 2.0%	35%	42%	–	23%	7%
Fox News	Aug 11–13, 2019	1,013 (RV)	± 3.0%	38%	50%	5%	4%	12%
SurveyUSA	Aug 1–5, 2019	5,459 (RV)	± 1.6%	42%	50%	–	9%	8%
IBD/TIPP	Jul 25 – Aug 1, 2019	856 (RV)	± 3.5%	41%	54%	1%	3%	14%
Emerson College	Jul 27–29, 2019	1,233 (RV)	± 2.7%	49%	51%	–	–	2%
HarrisX	Jul 25–26, 2019	1,000 (RV)	–	39%	42%	11% (Note: "Other" with 7%; would not vote with 5%)	8%	3%
Fox News	Jul 21–23, 2019	1,004 (RV)	± 3.0%	39%	49%	5%	5%	10%
NBC News/Wall Street Journal	Jul 7–9, 2019	800 (RV)	± 3.5%	42%	51%	4%	3%	9%
Emerson College	Jul 6–8, 2019	1,100 (RV)	± 2.9%	47%	53%	–	–	6%
Rasmussen Reports	Jun 23 – Jul 2, 2019	4,500 (LV)	± 1.5%	44%	48%	–	7%	4%
ABC News/Washington Post	Jun 28 – Jul 1, 2019	875 (RV)	± 4.0%	43%	53%	–	1%	10%
Emerson College	Jun 21–24, 2019	1,096 (RV)	± 2.9%	45%	55%	–	–	10%
HarrisX	Jun 22–23, 2019	1,001 (RV)	± 3.1%	40%	41%	11% (Note: "Other" with 8%; would not vote with 3%)	8%	1%
Fox News	Jun 9–12, 2019	1,001 (RV)	± 3.0%	39%	49%	5%	5%	10%
Ipsos/Daily Beast	Jun 10–11, 2019	1,005 (A)	± 2.5%	35%	46%	–	9%	11%
Quinnipiac University	Jun 6–10, 2019	1,214 (RV)	± 3.5%	40%	53%	1%	4%	13%
Morning Consult	Jun 7–9, 2019	1,991 (RV)	± 2.0%	33%	44%	–	24%	11%
Ipsos/Reuters	May 29 – Jun 5, 2019	3,851 (RV)	± 1.8%	36%	50%	7%	5%	14%
HarrisX	May 25–26, 2019	1,001 (RV)	± 3.1%	36%	43%	5%	11%	7%
Change Research	May 18–21, 2019	2,904 (LV)	± 1.8%	46%	47%	7%	–	1%
Civiqs/Daily Kos	May 12–14, 2019	1,650 (RV)	± 2.6%	44%	48%	–	8%	4%
Fox News	May 11–14, 2019	1,008 (RV)	± 3.0%	38%	49%	5%	5%	11%
Emerson College	May 10–13, 2019	1,006 (RV)	± 3.0%	46%	54%	–	–	8%
Zogby Analytics	May 2–9, 2019	903 (LV)	–	39%	49%	–	12%	10%
HarrisX	Apr 28–29, 2019	1,002 (RV)	± 3.1%	36%	43%	8%	8%	7%
CNN/SSRS	Apr 25–28, 2019	470 (RV)	± 5.5%	45%	51%	<1%	2%	6%
HarrisX	Apr 25–26, 2019	1,000 (RV)	± 3.1%	37%	43%	5%	15%	6%
Morning Consult	Apr 19–21, 2019	1,992 (RV)	± 2.0%	34%	42%	–	19%	8%
Emerson College	Apr 11–14, 2019	914 (RV)	± 3.2%	47%	53%	–	–	6%
Civiqs/Daily Kos	Apr 6–9, 2019	1,584 (RV)	± 2.7%	45%	45%	–	10%	Tie
HarrisX	Mar 31 – Apr 1, 2019	1,000 (RV)	± 3.1%	36%	45%	8%	8%	9%
Public Policy Polling	Mar 27–28, 2019	846 (RV)	± 3.4%	40%	53%	–	7%	13%
Rasmussen Reports	Mar 17–28, 2019	5,000 (LV)	± 1.5%	44%	49%	–	7%	5%
Fox News	Mar 17–20, 2019	1,002 (RV)	± 3.0%	40%	47%	4%	5%	7%
Emerson College	Mar 17–18, 2019	1,153 (RV)	± 2.8%	45%	55%	–	–	10%
HarrisX	Mar 17–18, 2019	1,001 (RV)	± 3.1%	33%	44%	8%	10%	11%
Civiqs/Daily Kos	Mar 9–12, 2019	1,622 (A)	± 2.6%	43%	48%	–	9%	5%
Change Research	Mar 8–10, 2019	4,049 (LV)	± 2.5%	46%	51%	–	–	5%
D-CYFOR	Feb 22–23, 2019	1,000 (RV)	± 3.1%	40%	51%	–	9%	11%
Emerson College	Feb 14–16, 2019	1,000 (RV)	± 3.0%	45%	55%	–	–	10%
Change Research	Jan 31 – Feb 1, 2019	1,338 (LV)	± 2.7%	45%	52%	–	–	7%
Øptimus	Jan 30 – Feb 1, 2019	1,084 (LV)	± 3.0%	43%	50%	–	7%	7%
Public Policy Polling	Jan 19–21, 2019	760 (RV)	± 3.6%	41%	53%	–	6%	12%
HarrisX	Dec 16–17, 2018	1,001 (RV)	± 3.1%	36%	42%	–	22%	6%
SurveyMonkey/Axios	Oct 24–29, 2018	3,064 (RV)	–	44%	53%	–	3%	9%
Morning Consult/Politico	Aug 16–18, 2018	1,974 (RV)	± 2.0%	31%	43%	–	26%	12%
Morning Consult/Politico	Jul 26–30, 2018	1,993 (RV)	± 2.0%	37%	44%	–	19%	7%
Public Policy Polling	Jun 8–10, 2018	679 (RV)	± 3.8%	39%	53%	–	8%	14%
Zogby Analytics	May 10–12, 2018	881 (LV)	± 3.2%	38%	48%	–	14%	10%
Public Policy Polling	Mar 23–25, 2018	846 (RV)	± 3.4%	39%	56%	–	6%	17%
Public Policy Polling	Feb 9–11, 2018	687 (RV)	± 3.7%	42%	51%	–	7%	9%
CNN/SSRS	Jan 14–18, 2018	913 (RV)	± 3.8%	40%	57%	1%	1%	17%
Zogby Analytics	Jan 12–15, 2018	847 (LV)	± 3.4%	38%	53%	–	9%	15%
Public Policy Polling	Dec 11–12, 2017	862 (RV)	± 3.3%	40%	54%	–	6%	14%
Morning Consult/Politico	Nov 9–11, 2017	1,993 (RV)	± 2.0%	35%	46%	–	20%	11%
Public Policy Polling	Oct 27–29, 2017	572 (RV)	± 4.1%	38%	56%	–	6%	16%
Zogby Analytics	Oct 19–25, 2017	1,514 (LV)	± 2.5%	41%	50%	–	9%	9%
Emerson College	Oct 12–14, 2017	820 (RV)	± 3.4%	42%	51%	–	7%	9%
Public Policy Polling	Sep 22–25, 2017	865 (RV)	± 3.3%	40%	53%	–	6%	13%
Public Policy Polling	Aug 18–21, 2017	887 (RV)	± 3.3%	39%	51%	–	11%	12%
Public Policy Polling	Jul 14–17, 2017	836 (RV)	± 3.4%	39%	54%	–	7%	15%
Public Policy Polling	Jun 9–11, 2017	811 (RV)	± 3.4%	41%	54%	–	5%	14%
Public Policy Polling	May 12–14, 2017	692 (RV)	± 3.7%	40%	54%	–	6%	14%
Public Policy Polling	Apr 17–18, 2017	648 (RV)	± 3.9%	40%	54%	–	6%	14%
Public Policy Polling	Mar 27–28, 2017	677 (RV)	± 3.8%	40%	54%	–	6%	14%

== See also ==
- Nationwide hypothetical polling for the 2020 United States presidential election
- Statewide opinion polling for the 2020 United States presidential election
- Nationwide opinion polling for the 2020 Democratic Party presidential primaries
- Statewide opinion polling for the 2020 Democratic Party presidential primaries
- Opinion polling for the 2020 Republican Party presidential primaries
- 2020 Democratic National Convention
- 2020 Republican National Convention
- Opinion polling on the first Donald Trump administration

== Notes ==
Partisan clients
