= Crimson Hexagon =

- Drive results with consumer insights that matter
- Type: Social media analytics software
- Founded: 2007; 19 years ago
- Founder: Gary King
- Headquarters: Boston, United States
- Services: Consumer insights, social media analytics
- Number of employees: 200
- Website: www.brandwatch.com

Crimson Hexagon was a social media analytics company based in Boston, Massachusetts. The company also had a European office in London, England. The company and its nearest competitor, Brandwatch, merged in 2018, with the new company taking the name Brandwatch.

The company's online data library consisted of over 1 trillion publicly available posts, and includes documents from social networks such as Twitter, Instagram and Facebook as well as blogs, forums, and news sites. The company's ForSight platform, still available to Crimson Hexagon customers post-merger, is a Twitter Certified Product.

Crimson Hexagon's analysis of current events and trending topics was often featured in news articles. Pew Research used Crimson Hexagon's social media analysis platform to analyze media coverage and discourse. The company also partnered with the Russian government in 2013 to monitor social media trends on LiveJournal, Twitter, and Russian social media platforms. In 2018, Facebook suspended their partnership with the company due to these connections.

== History ==
Crimson Hexagon was founded in 2007 by Gary King and Candace Fleming based upon technology King developed at Harvard University’s Institute for Quantitative Social Science. In 2012, Stephanie Newby became the company's CEO.

In March 2014, the company announced its Affinities feature, which allows marketers to identify the interests of people talking about brands, products, or companies on social media.

On September 5, 2018, Crimson Hexagon released the industry's first reverse image search technology.

On October 4, 2018 Crimson Hexagon announced it was merging with Brandwatch.
