= House Majority PAC =

American political action committee

- Abbreviation: HMP
- Formation: April 8, 2011; 15 years ago
- Type: Hybrid PAC
- Registration no.: C00495028
- Headquarters: Washington, D.C.
- Affiliations: Hakeem Jeffries; Nancy Pelosi (formerly)
- Revenue: 260,472,609 USD (Jan 2023 to Dec 2024)
- Website: thehousemajoritypac.com

House Majority Forward
- Type: 501(c)(4)
- Tax ID no.: 834185105
- Revenue: 97,698,563 USD (2024)

House Majority PAC is a United States Hybrid PAC that describes itself as "the only Super PAC solely focused on electing House Democrats".

The PAC is associated with the 501(c)(4) nonprofit House Majority Forward.

== See also ==
- Democratic Congressional Campaign Committee
- Congressional Leadership Fund
- Senate Majority PAC
- Senate Leadership Fund
