= Brandwatch =

UK business

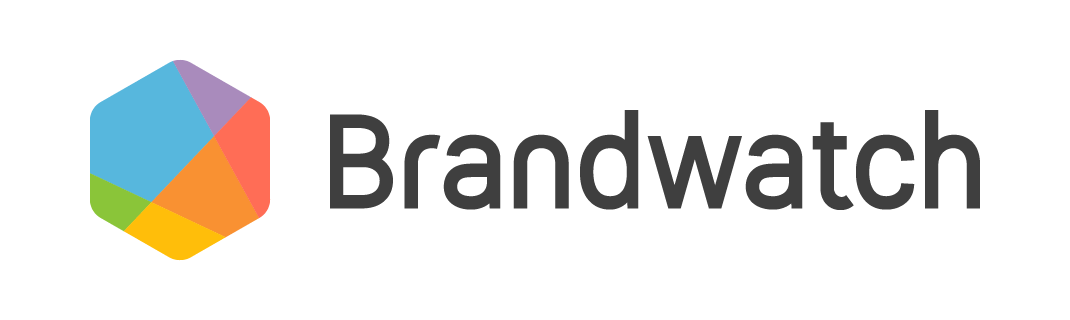
- Type: Social media software
- Founded: 2007
- Founder: Giles Palmer
- Headquarters: Brighton, United Kingdom
- Number of locations: 17
- Key people: Guy Abramo (Chief Executive Officer)
- Products: Consumer Research; Vizia; Reviews
- Brands: Consumer Intelligence; Social Media Management
- Services: Market research, consumer research, social media analytics, social media monitoring, social media management.
- Number of employees: 501-1000 (2024)
- Parent: Cision
- Website: https://brandwatch.com/

Brandwatch is a UK based social media suite company owned by Cision. Brandwatch sells two different products: Consumer Intelligence and Social.

Consumer Intelligence is made up of three different products: Consumer Research, Add-ons Vizia and Reviews. Consumer Research archives social media data from 100 million online sources to provide companies with the means to conduct market research and analyse their brands' online presence among other use cases.

Social Media Management is made up of eight different products: Publish, Advertise, Measure, Benchmark, Influence, Engage, Audience, and Listen. Much of this is made up of products formerly sold under the Falcon.io suite. Falcon.io was acquired by Cision in January 2019 and merged with Brandwatch in May 2022.

== History ==
In 1999, Runtime Collective Ltd, a web-engineering company, was incorporated by CEO Giles Palmer. In 2005, the company launched Magpie Search and Alert, a search engine for finding documents such as financial statements and patents. In 2007, this was relaunched as Brandwatch, which instead focused on tracking social media mentions and social advertising impact.

=== Investment ===
The company received $6 million in venture capital from Nauta Capital in March 2012. In March 2014, Brandwatch partnered with Gnip, a social media API company, to release a new application that would allow users to access more social data and analytics. By May 2014, Brandwatch had gained $22 million from a new round of funding led by Highland Capital. In September 2015, Brandwatch launched a French website., On 29 October 2015, Brandwatch raised $33 million in Series C funding, led by Partech Investors, to invest further growth in the US. In February 2021, Brandwatch was acquired by Cision.

=== PeerIndex acquisition ===
PeerIndex was a London-based company, founded by Azeem Azhar, providing social media analytics based on footprints from use of major social media services. Part of an emerging group of social media analytics providers, PeerIndex helped social media contributors to assess and score their influence and benefit from the social capital they have built up. PeerIndex tracked approximately 45 million Twitter profiles, making the company one of the leaders in its sector.

Brandwatch acquired PeerIndex in December 2014. With the use of PeerIndex technology, Brandwatch created their Audiences product, which they released in July 2016.

=== BuzzSumo acquisition ===
BuzzSumo is a content marketing research and analysis tool, with its first Pro version released in September 2014. Brandwatch acquired BuzzSumo in October 2017.

=== Crimson Hexagon merger ===
Crimson Hexagon was a social intelligence company that was a competitor of Brandwatch. The two companies merged in October 2018, combining their technology and customer base into a $100m business.

=== Brandwatch Consumer Research ===
Following the Brandwatch-Crimson Hexagon merger, the two companies' technology was combined to create Brandwatch Consumer Research. This product would replace Brandwatch Analytics and Crimson Hexagon's Forsight.

=== Qriously acquisition ===
Qriously is a mobile market research, polling, and survey tool. The tool has been notable in its use of predicting an accurate prediction for the Labour Party (UK)'s vote share in the 2017 United Kingdom general election. Qriously, along with Kantar and Opinium Research, were also praised for their 2019 United Kingdom general election prediction.

Qriously were acquired by Brandwatch in March 2019. It is no longer available for clients.

=== Cision acquisition ===
Brandwatch was acquired in February 2021 by Cision for $450 million USD.

=== Falcon.io merge ===
Falcon.io was acquired by Cision in January 2019 and merged with Brandwatch in May 2022. Products formerly sold as part of the Falcon.io suite now sit within Brandwatch’s Social Media Management.

== Overview ==
Brandwatch is a subscription-based service with over 7,500 clients.

Brandwatch has 17 offices across the world, including in New York, London, Brighton, Copenhagen, Berlin, Sofia, Paris, Singapore, and Sydney.

== See also ==
- Engagio
- Klout
- Q Score
