= Senate Majority PAC =

- Abbreviation: SMP
- Formation: June 11, 2010; 16 years ago
- Type: Super PAC
- Registration no.: C00484642
- Headquarters: Washington, D.C.
- President: JB Poersch
- Affiliations: Chuck Schumer
- Revenue: 389,968,278 USD (Jan 2023 to Dec 2024)
- Website: senatemajority.com

Majority Forward
- Type: 501(c)(4)
- Tax ID no.: 833690373; 474368320
- Revenue: 119,607,435 USD (2025)

Senate Majority PAC is a United States Super PAC that describes itself as working "to elect Democratic senators".

The PAC is associated with the 501(c)(4) nonprofit Majority Forward. The PAC also funds the WinSenate Super PAC.

== See also ==
- Senate Leadership Fund
- House Majority PAC
