= University of Southern California academics =

The academics of the University of Southern California center on The College of Letters, Arts, and Sciences, the Graduate School, and its 17 professional schools.

== Overview ==
USC is a member of the Association of American Universities, joining in 1969. The University of Southern California houses professional schools offering a number of varying disciplines among which include communication, law, dentistry, medicine, business, engineering, journalism, public policy, music, architecture, and cinematic arts. USC's academic departments fall either under the general liberal arts and sciences of the College of Letters, Arts, and Sciences for undergraduates, the Graduate School for graduates, or the university's 17 professional schools.

== Dana and David Dornsife College of Letters, Arts and Sciences ==
The USC Dana and David Dornsife College of Letters, Arts and Sciences, the oldest and largest of the USC schools, grants undergraduate degrees in more than 130 majors and minors in the humanities, social sciences, and natural/physical sciences, and offers doctoral and masters programs in over 20 fields. USC College is responsible for the general education program for all USC undergraduates and houses a full-time faculty of approximately 700, more than 6,500 undergraduate majors (roughly half the total USC undergraduate population), and 1,200 doctoral students. In addition to 30 academic departments, the college also houses dozens of research centers and institutes. In 2007, Howard Gillman, Professor of Political Science, History, and Law, was appointed the 20th Dean of the college. In the 2008–2009 academic year, 4,400 undergraduate degrees and 5,500 advanced degrees were awarded. All Ph.D. degrees awarded at USC and most master's degrees are under the jurisdiction of the Graduate School. Professional degrees are awarded by each of the respective professional schools. In 2011, the college changed its name from College of Letters, Arts and Sciences to the USC Dana and David Dornsife College of Letters, Arts and Sciences due to a donation of $200 million to the school made by Dana and David Dornsife. This gift is the largest in USC history.

== The Graduate School ==
All Ph.D. degrees awarded at USC and most master's degrees are under the jurisdiction of the Graduate School.

== Professional schools ==
Professional degrees are awarded by each of the 17 professional schools.

=== Leventhal School of Accounting ===
The Leventhal School of Accounting is a department of the Marshall School of Business founded in 1979.

=== Iovine and Young Academy ===
The Iovine and Young is USC's 20th and newest professional school.

=== Glorya Kaufman School of Dance ===
It was announced in 2012 that the School of Dance would be opened on campus; it opened to students in the fall of 2015.

=== Herman Ostrow School of Dentistry ===
The Herman Ostrow School of Dentistry is composed of seven divisions, including the Division of Biokinesiology and Physical Therapy and the Division of Occupational Science and Occupational Therapy.

=== Roski School of Art and Design ===
In 2006, The USC School of Fine Arts was renamed in honor of Gayle Roski, the wife of billionaire developer Edward P. Roski, after a $23-million donation to the school. Both are USC alums.

=== School of Pharmacy ===
Founded in 1905.

USC developed the nation's first Doctor of Pharmacy degree (PharmD) in 1950 and it was among the first schools of pharmacy to establish a clinical curriculum, beginning in 1968. Those were radical advances at the time but are now considered foundational training for all pharmacists throughout the US. The School also helped transform the pharmacist's role from a traditional dispenser of medicines to a direct provider of patient care. USC led a key pilot project in the 1970s to explore prescriptive authority for pharmacists that, in 1981, led to California being the first state to enact legislation allowing pharmacists to prescribe drug therapy in collaboration with physicians. USC then played a key role in the successful legislation in California that recognized pharmacists as healthcare providers in 2014.

USC is the only private school of pharmacy on a major health sciences campus.

=== Sol Price School of Public Policy ===
The mission of the USC Sol Price School of Public Policy is to improve the quality of life for people and their communities, in Southern California and abroad. It offers five master's level programs: Public Policy, Public Administration, Urban Planning, Real Estate Development, and Health Policy and Management. Graduate students at USC Price have considerable latitude to pursue their specialized areas of interest. Undergraduates pursue a more general Bachelor of Science in Public Policy, Management, and Planning/ For mid-career professionals, USC Price offers the Executive Master of Health Administration, the Executive Master of Leadership, and the International Public Policy and Management program.

=== Suzanne Dworak-Peck School of Social Work ===
In September 2016, Suzanne Dworak-Peck, BA ’65, MSW ’67, made a $60 million gift to endow and name the USC Suzanne Dworak-Peck School of Social Work. This is the largest single gift to a school of Social Work in the United States.

=== School of Cinematic Arts ===
The School of Cinematic Arts, the first film school in the country and perhaps USC's most famous school, confers degrees in critical studies, screenwriting, film production, interactive media, animation, and film producing. As the university administration considered cinematic skills too valuable to be kept to film industry professionals, the school opened its classes to the university at large in 1998. In 2001, the film school added an Interactive Media Division studying stereoscopic cinema, panoramic cinema, immersive cinema, interactive cinema, video games, virtual reality, and mobile media. In September 2006, George Lucas donated $175 million to expand the film school, the largest single donation to USC (and its fifth over $100 million).

=== School of Architecture ===
The Department of Architecture was established at USC within the Roski School of Fine Arts in 1916, becoming the first of its kind in Southern California. The department grew rapidly with the help of the Allied Architects of Los Angeles. A separate School of Architecture was organized in September 1925. Since then, the school has been home to teachers such as Richard Neutra, Ralph Knowles, A. Quincy Jones, William Pereira, and Pierre Koenig. The School of Architecture can also claim notable alumni Frank Gehry, Thom Mayne, Raphael Soriano, Gregory Ain, and Pierre Koenig. Two of the alumni have become Pritzker Prize winners. In 2006, Qingyun Ma, a distinguished Shanghai-based architect, was named dean of the school. In addition, in its 2009 edition of "America's Best Architecture & Design School", the journal DesignIntelligence ranked USC School of Architecture as the 12th best undergraduate architecture school in the U.S.

=== Viterbi School of Engineering ===
The Andrew and Erna Viterbi School of Engineering is headed by Dean Yannis Yortsos. Its research centers have played a major role in the development of multiple technologies, including the early development of the Internet when USC researcher Jonathan Postel was an editor of communications protocol for the fledgling internet, also known as ARPANET. The school's faculty includes Seymour Ginsburg, Irving Reed, Leonard Adleman, Solomon W. Golomb, Barry Boehm, Clifford Newman, Iraj Ershaghi, Richard Bellman, Lloyd Welch, and Alexander Sawchuk. Previously known as the USC School of Engineering, it was renamed on March 2, 2004, as the Andrew and Erna Viterbi School of Engineering in honor of Qualcomm founder Andrew Viterbi and his wife Erna, who had recently donated $52 million to the school. The Viterbi School received other major gifts including gifts from Silicon Valley venture capitalist Mark Stevens and his wife Mary who created the USC Stevens Institute for Innovation in 2004; real estate developer Daniel J. Epstein who named the Epstein Department of Industrial and Systems Engineering in 2002; Energy Corporation of America CEO John Mork and his family who named the Mork Family Department of Chemical Engineering and Materials Science in 2005; Ken Klein, CEO and president of Wind River Systems, who established the Klein Institute for Undergraduate Engineering Life, also in 2005; Ming Hsieh, founder of Cogent Inc., who named the Ming Hsieh Department of Electrical Engineering in 2006 with a $35 million gift; and Los Angeles real estate developer Sonny Astani, who named the Sonny Astani Department of Civil and Environmental Engineering with a $17 million gift in 2007.

=== Annenberg School for Communication and Journalism ===
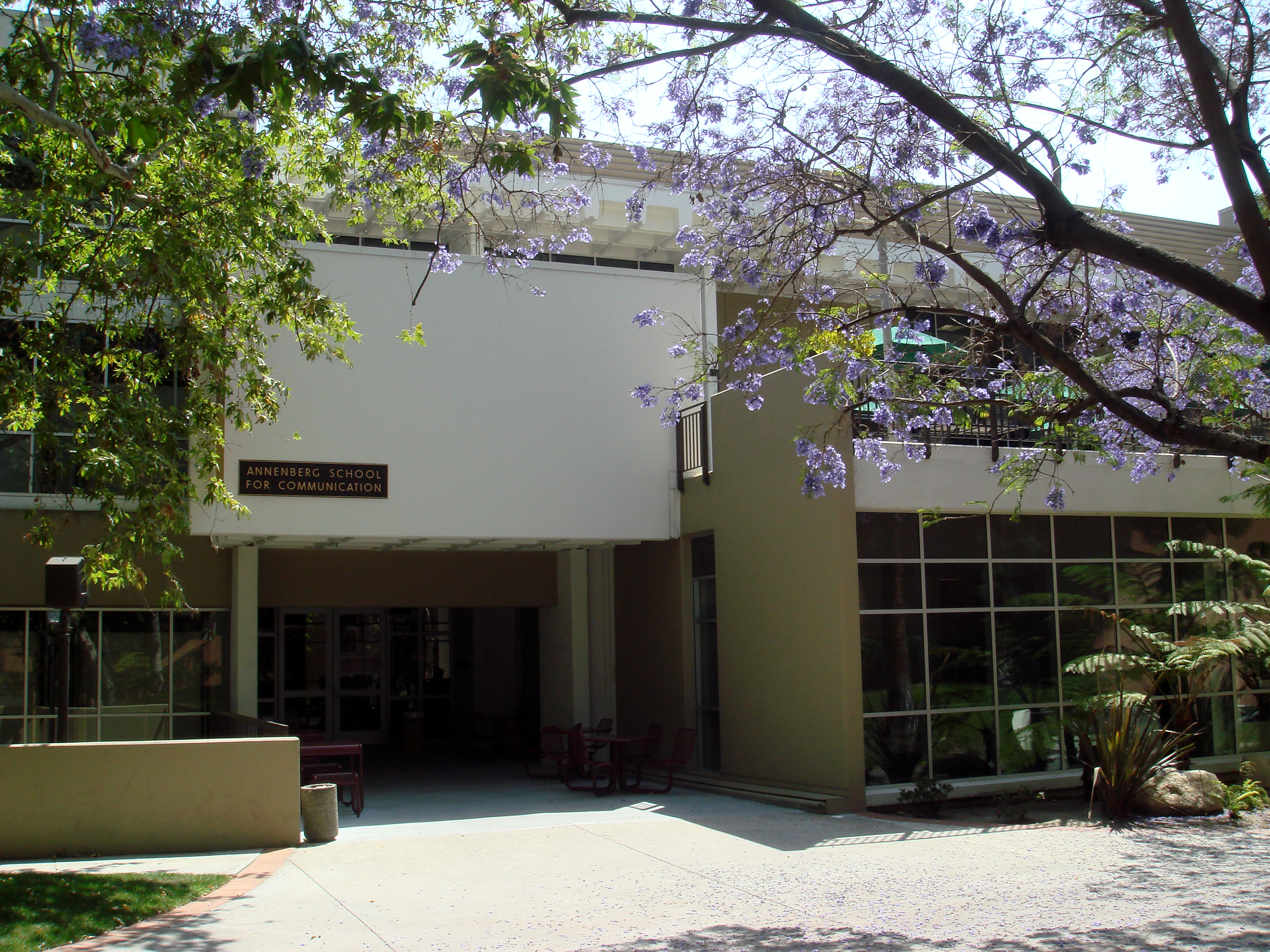
Annenberg School for Communication

The Annenberg School for Communication, founded in 1971 is one of the two communication programs in the country endowed by Walter Annenberg (the other is at the University of Pennsylvania). The School of Journalism, which became part of the School for Communication in 1994, features a core curriculum that requires students to devote themselves equally to print, broadcast and online media for the first year of study. USC's Annenberg School for Communication endowment rose from $7.5 million to $218 million between 1996 and 2007.

== Collaborations ==
USC collaborated with Shanghai Jiao Tong University to offer the USC (Executive) EMBA program in Shanghai. USC also operates two international study centers in Paris and Madrid. Beginning in 2006, the Marshall School of Business will have a San Diego satellite campus. In May 2006, USC's board of trustees and administration traveled to China. to announce the establishment of the USC U.S.-China Institute (USCI) joint research institute on U.S.-China relations and trends in China. USCI has funded research into a variety of topics including the history of U.S.-China diplomatic exchanges, aging, property rights, environmental challenges, agricultural policy, new media, migration, and technology exchange.
