= Brandwatch Qriously =

UK polling company

- Type: Limited company
- Industry: Market research and public opinion polling
- Founded: 29 November 2010
- Founder: Christopher Kahler; Gerald Müller; Abraham Müller
- Headquarters: Brandwatch, Brighton, United Kingdom
- Website: www.brandwatch.com

Brandwatch Qriously is a market research and polling company, owned by Brandwatch. According to Bloomberg, Brandwatch Qriously "provides an online service for measuring location-based public sentiments in real-time". The company's business model is based around developing advertisements within mobile apps which display questions for users to answer.

== History ==
Brandwatch Qriously was co-founded by Austrians Christopher Kahler (CEO), Gerald Müller and Abraham Müller. The founders were working in China in 2007, where they created Urbian, a location-based mobile business that prefigured Foursquare. Two venture capital funding rounds ran out in 2010, so they focused on building Android apps that could be profitable, and this grew into asking mobile users simple targeted questions.

They returned to Austria in 2010, and raised $1.6 million in venture capital from Accel Partners, based on setting up the company up in London.

As of June 2015, Brandwatch Qriously had raised $5.1 million, and had 19 employees. Its Series A round was led by Spark Capital, and its previous backer Accel also participated.

As of March 2018, the company is owned by Brandwatch.

== Political polling ==
Brandwatch Qriously claimed that their polls correctly predicted the outcome of the 2016 UK Brexit referendum and the 2016 Italian referendum.

On the day before the 2017 United Kingdom general election, Brandwatch Qriously and Wired published a poll showing voting intentions of 41% for Labour and 39% for the Conservatives. The final results were 41% and 44% respectively and so the poll did not correctly predict the outcome (which would have seen Labour as the largest party in terms of MPs, although not necessarily with a majority). However, the Brandwatch Qriously figure for Labour was closer than most of the mainstream polls in the run-up to the election.

On the day before the 2019 United Kingdom general election, Brandwatch published a poll using the company's technology showing voting intentions of 43.2% for the Conservatives, 30.4% for the Labour Party, and 11.6% for the Liberal Democrats. The final results were 43.6% for the Conservatives, 32.2% for the Labour Party, and 11.6% for the Liberal Democrats.

== Worst name in ad-tech ==
In 2014, Qriously won Advertising Age's award for the "worst name in ad-tech", after voting in a poll, where it "beat" Vungle, Nanigans, AdsWizz, and Burt.
