= Opinium Research =

Market research and insight agency

Opinium
- Industry: Market Research
- Founded: 2007
- Headquarters: London and New York
- Key people: James Endersby (CEO & President), Mark Petrone (VP Research, US), Emily Dickinson (Director), Wez Eathorne (Director), Alexa Nightingale (Director), Steve Looney (Director), Kate Jalie (Director), Ben Davis (Director)
- Services: Brand & Communications Research Product & Service Development Research Stakeholder Research Thought Leadership Research
- Number of employees: 103
- Website: opinium.com

Opinium is a market research and insight agency established on 7 September 2007. It is headquartered in New York and London. Its chief executive is James Endersby. The agency works across five practice areas: Brand & Communications, Product & Service Development, Stakeholder Research, and Thought Leadership. It is chiefly known for its full service market research and insight consultancy for clients ranging from Vodafone, Unilever, Santander, MetLife, Dawn Foods, Direct Line Insurance, Itsu, Next, Amnesty International, to the London School of Economics and Canderel.

The agency also works in the political space and conducts political polls on behalf of The Guardian US in the United States and The Observer, and The Guardian's Sunday edition in the United Kingdom. Opinium's most recent success in political polling came at the 2019 UK General Election where they were the joint most accurate agency, calling the actual results. In the 2016 EU Referendum, Opinium were the only agency to predict the eventual outcome with the smallest error. As well as political surveys, Opinium also explore topical social and political issues. Opinium has also been celebrated for being a great place to work for employees and currently hold three best place to work awards, including the Women in Research Best Place to Work Globally 2019 and The Drum Agency Business Awards Great Place to Work 2018 and 2019. They have also won the UK Market Research Society Best Place to Work Award a record three times. Opinium are also ranked the 9th Best Place to Work in the UK (SME), and ranked 2nd for the Best Workplace for Women.

Opinium is a member of the Market Research Society (MRS), The Insights Association of America and the British Polling Council (BPC).

== Political poll archive ==
The company has freely available political voting intention polls on their website along with results from regular surveys conducted on current and topical events.

In February 2022, Opinium altered their weighting methodology. Most significantly turnout weighting changes will reduce the effect of Conservative voters who have recently moved to undecided. The effect of these changes was to reduce the Labour lead stated from about 10% to 3%. The four main changes were:

- voting intention has usually been over-stated by online survey respondents, and unequally across demographic groups, so only respondents who give a voting intention will be used and weighting as in recent general elections only applied to that group rather than jointly with non-voters;
- the number of people who have low and mid levels of attention to politics has usually been under-represented in online surveys, so sampling was improved to include an appropriate number of people who have low and mid levels of attention to politics;
- weighting on ethnicity was introduced;
- previous weighting was correct overall on education profile and age profile, but for older people graduates were significantly over-represented, so cross weighting between age, gender, and education qualifications was introduced.

== See also ==
- Marketing research
