= Nationwide hypothetical polling for the 2020 United States presidential election =

This is a list of nationwide public opinion polls that have been conducted relating to the general election for the 2020 United States presidential election. The persons named in the polls were declared candidates or received media speculation about their possible candidacy. If multiple versions of polls are provided, the version among likely voters (LV) is prioritized, then registered voters (RV), then adults (A).

== Donald Trump vs. former Democratic candidates ==
The following candidates are ordered by the date they withdrew or suspended their campaign.

Bernie Sanders

Poll source	Date(s) administered	Sample size (Note: Key: A – all adults RV – registered voters LV – likely voters V – unclear)	Margin of error	Donald Trump (R)	Bernie Sanders (D)	Other	Undecided
YouGov/Yahoo News	Apr 6–7, 2020	1,144 (RV)	–	42%	45%	8% (Note: "Third party candidate" with 4%; would not vote with 4%)	5%
YouGov/Economist	Apr 5–7, 2020	1,143 (RV)	± 3.1%	42%	48%	5% (Note: "Other" with 3%; would not vote with 2%)	4%
Morning Consult	Mar 30 – Apr 5, 2020	30,985 (RV)	± 1%	43%	45%	–	12%
Change Research	Apr 2–3, 2020	1,200 (LV)	–	44%	46%	8% (Note: "Third party candidate" with 8%; would not vote with 0%)	3%
IBD/TIPP	Mar 29 – Apr 1, 2020	980 (RV)	–	42%	43%	7% (Note: "Other" with 6%; "prefer not to answer" with 1%)	7%
YouGov/Economist	Mar 29–31, 2020	1,185 (RV)	± 3.2%	44%	45%	6% (Note: "Other" with 4%; would not vote with 2%)	5%
Selzer & Co./Grinnell College	Mar 27–30, 2020	777 (LV)	± 3.5%	44%	43%	11% (Note: "Someone else" with 9%; would not vote with 2%)	2%
Morning Consult	Mar 23–29, 2020	34,645 (RV)	± 1%	43%	45%	–	12%
YouGov/Economist	Mar 26–28, 2020	1,185 (RV)	± 3.2%	44%	45%	4%	5%
YouGov/Yahoo News	Mar 25–26, 2020	1,168 (RV)	–	41%	45%	6% (Note: "Third party candidate" with 4%; would not vote with 2%)	8%
Harvard-Harris	Mar 24–26, 2020	1,201 (RV)	–	47%	53%	–	–
YouGov/Economist	Mar 22–24, 2020	1,166 (RV)	± 3.4%	44%	46%	6%	5%
Echelon Insights	Mar 20–24, 2020	1,000 (RV)	–	43%	47%	–	11%
Ipsos/Reuters	Mar 18–24, 2020	4,428 (A)	± 1.7%	37%	40%	17% (Note: "Neither/other" with 9%; would not vote with 6%)	8% (Note: Listed as "don't know/refused")
Lord Ashcroft Polls	Mar 10–24, 2020	10,357 (A)	–	39%	47%	7% (Note: Would not vote with 7%)	7%
Redfield & Wilton Strategies	Mar 23, 2020	1,500 (LV)	± 2.57%	41% (Note: Percentages calculated as listed percentage in sample without undecided voters * Percentage of voters who are not undecided)	49%	3% (Note: "Would vote for a third party/write-in candidate" with 3%)	7%
Morning Consult	Mar 16–22, 2020	36,272 (RV)	± 1%	42%	46%	–	12%
Emerson College	Mar 18–19, 2020	1,100 (RV)	± 2.9%	47% (Note: Including voters who lean towards a given candidate)	53%	–	–
YouGov/Economist	Mar 15–17, 2020	1,129 (RV)	± 3.5%	41%	48%	5%	6%
Ipsos/Reuters	Mar 13–16, 2020	955 (RV)	± 3.6%	39%	45%	9% (Note: "Neither/other" with 6%; would not vote with 3%)	6%
Morning Consult	Mar 11–15, 2020	9,979 (RV)	± 1%	42%	47%	–	11%
NBC News/Wall Street Journal	Mar 11–13, 2020	900 (RV)	± 3.3%	45%	49%	4%	2%
YouGov/Hofstra University	Mar 5–12, 2020	1,500 (LV)	± 2.9%	50%	50%	–	–
YouGov/Yahoo News	Mar 10–11, 2020	1,242 (RV)	–	42%	45%	8%	5%
Civiqs/Daily Kos	Mar 8–11, 2020	1,441 (RV)	± 2.7%	46%	49%	–	5%
YouGov/Economist	Mar 8–10, 2020	1,191 (RV)	± 2.9%	43%	47%	5% (Note: "Other" with 2%; would not vote with 3%)	5%
Ipsos/Reuters	Mar 6–9, 2020	956 (RV)	± 3.6%	42%	43%	10% (Note: "Neither/other" with 8%; would not vote with 2%)	5%
Quinnipiac	Mar 5–8, 2020	1,261 (RV)	± 2.8%	42%	49%	5% (Note: "Someone else" with 2%; would not vote with 3%)	4%
Morning Consult	Mar 5–8, 2020	6,112 (RV)	± 1%	41%	47%	–	12%
CNN/SSRS	Mar 4–7, 2020	1,084 (RV)	± 3.5%	45%	52%	2% (Note: "Other" with 0%; "neither" with 2%)	1%
IBD/TIPP	Feb 20–29, 2020	839 (RV)	–	47%	49%	2% (Note: "Other" with 2%; "refused" with 0%)	2%
Harvard-Harris	Feb 26–28, 2020	643 (RV)	–	46%	54%	–	–
YouGov/Yahoo News	Feb 26–27, 2020	1,662 (RV)	–	42%	48%	6%	2%
Morning Consult	Feb 23–27, 2020	6,117 (RV)	± 1%	41%	47%	–	12%
Fox News	Feb 23–26, 2020	1,000 (RV)	± 3.0%	42%	49%	5%	4%
Rasmussen Reports	Feb 24–25, 2020	1,000 (LV)	± 3.0%	50%	43%	–	7%
Ipsos/Reuters	Feb 19–25, 2020	3,809 (RV)	± 1.8%	40% (Note: Additional data sourced from FiveThirtyEight)	47%	– (Note: Not yet released)	–
YouGov/CBS News	Feb 20–22, 2020	10,000 (RV)	± 1.2%	44%	47%	4% (Note: "Someone else/third party" with 3%; would not vote with 1%)	4%
Saint Leo University	Feb 17–22, 2020	1,000 (A)	± 3%	37.2%	49.1%	–	13.7%
Emerson College	Feb 16–18, 2020	1,250 (RV)	± 2.7%	49%	51%	–	–
ABC News/Washington Post	Feb 14–17, 2020	913 (RV)	± 4%	45%	51%	4% (Note: "Other" with no voters; "neither" with 3%; would not vote with 1%)	0%
NBC News/Wall Street Journal	Feb 14–17, 2020	900 (RV)	± 3.3%	46%	50%	–	–
Global Strategy Group/GBAO	Feb 14–17, 2020	600 (RV)	–	42%	50%	4% (Note: Would not vote with 4%)	5%
Ipsos/Reuters	Feb 14–17, 2020	947 (RV)	± 3.6%	40%	43%	11% (Note: "Neither/other" with 9%; would not vote with 2%)	6%
SurveyUSA	Feb 13–17, 2020	2,768 (RV)	± 1.9%	45%	50%	–	5%
Morning Consult	Feb 12–17, 2020	7,313 (RV)	± 1%	42%	46%	–	12%
NPR/PBS News/Marist College	Feb 13–16, 2020	1,164 (RV)	± 3.7%	45%	48%	1%	5%
Ipsos/Reuters	Feb 6–10, 2020	952 (RV)	± 3.6%	41%	45%	11%	4% (Note: Includes "refused")
Quinnipiac	Feb 5–9, 2020	1,159 (RV)	± 2.5%	43%	51%	3% (Note: "Someone else" with 1%; would not vote with 2%)	3%
Morning Consult	Feb 4–9, 2020	36,180 (RV)	± 1%	43%	45%	–	12%
Atlas Intel	Jan 30 – Feb 2, 2020	1,600 (RV)	2%	44.9%	47.2%	–	7.9%
Morning Consult	Jan 27 – Feb 2, 2020	7,178 (RV)	± 1%	42%	46%	–	12%
IBD/TIPP (Note: Sample size for registered voters sourced from FiveThirtyEight)	Jan 23–30, 2020	856 (RV)	–	49%	47%	3% (Note: "Other" with 2%; "refused" with 1%)	1%
NBC/WSJ	Jan 26–29, 2020	1,000 (RV)	± 3.1%	45%	49%	5% (Note: "Neither/other" with 5%)	1%
USC Dornlife/LA Times	Jan 15–28, 2020	4,869 (RV)	± 2%	40%	47%	8% (Note: "Some other party's candidate" with 8%)	5%
Morning Consult	Jan 20–26, 2020	8,399 (RV)	± 1%	41%	46%	–	13%
Emerson College	Jan 21–23, 2020	1,128 (RV)	± 2.8%	49%	51%	–	–
Echelon Insights	Jan 20–23, 2020	1,000 (RV)	–	41%	48%	–	11%
ABC News/Washington Post	Jan 20–23, 2020	880 (RV)	± 4%	47%	49%	3% (Note: "Other" with 0%; "neither" with 2%; would not vote with 1%)	0%
Fox News	Jan 19–22, 2020	1,005 (RV)	± 3%	42%	48%	7% (Note: "Other" with 5%; would not vote with 2%)	3%
CNN/SSRS	Jan 16–19, 2020	1,051 (RV)	± 3.4%	45%	52%	2%	1%
Morning Consult	Jan 15–19, 2020	5,944 (RV)	± 1%	41%	45%	–	13%
Data for Progress/Lucid/Vox (Note: By the time of the poll's sampling dates, Data for Progress had endorsed the Elizabeth Warren 2020 presidential campaign)	Jan 9–19, 2020	1,606 (A) (Note: Responses to the question: "If the 2020 U.S. Presidential election was held today, who would you vote for if the candidates were Bernie Sanders and Donald Trump?") (Note: Sample size sourced from FiveThirtyEight)	–	41%	47%	–	
Data for Progress/Lucid/Vox	Jan 9–19, 2020	1,715 (A) (Note: Responses to the question: "If the 2020 U.S. Presidential election was held today, who would you vote for if the candidates were Democrat Bernie Sanders and Republican Donald Trump?")	–	43%	45%	–	
Data for Progress/Lucid/Vox	Jan 9–19, 2020	– (V) (Note: Responses to the question: " "If the 2020 U.S. Presidential election was held today, who would you vote for if the candidates were Democrat Bernie Sanders, who wants to tax the billionaire class to help the working class and Republican Donald Trump, who says Sanders is a socialist who supports a government takeover of healthcare and open borders?"")	–	41%	47%	–	
Zogby Analytics	Jan 15–16, 2020	882 (LV)	–	47%	45%	–	9%
SurveyUSA	Jan 14–16, 2020	4,069 (RV)	± 1.7%	43%	52%	–	5%
Morning Consult	Jan 6–12, 2020	8,299 (RV)	± 1%	42%	46%	–	13%
IBD/TIPP	Jan 3–11, 2020	901 (RV)	± 3.3%	47%	48%	3%	2%
Morning Consult	Dec 30, 2019 – Jan 5, 2020	8,436 (RV)	± 1%	42%	44%	–	14%
Ipsos/Reuters	Dec 18–19, 2019	1,117 (A)	± 3.3%	36%	40%	15%	9%
Ipsos/Reuters	Dec 18–19, 2019	1,108 (A)	± 3.4%	37%	39%	18% (Note: "Neither/other" with 10%; would not vote with 8%)	7%
Emerson College	Dec 15–17, 2019	1,222 (RV)	± 2.7%	48%	52%	–	–
CNN/ORC	Dec 12–15, 2019	1,005 (RV)	± 3.7%	45%	49%	0%	2%
IBD/TIPP	Dec 6–14, 2019	905 (RV)	± 3.3%	48%	47%	4% (Note: "Other" with 3%; "refused" with 1%)	1%
Fox News	Dec 8–11, 2019	1,000 (RV)	± 3.0%	43%	49%	2%	3%
Quinnipiac	Dec 4–9, 2019	1,553 (RV)	± 2.5%	43%	51%	4% (Note: "Someone else" with 2%; would not vote with 2%)	3%
Zogby Analytics	Dec 5–8, 2019	865 (LV)	± 3.3%	47%	45%	–	–
SurveyUSA	Nov 20–21, 2019	3,850 (RV)	± 1.7%	40%	52%	–	8%
RealClear Opinion Research	Nov 15–21, 2019	2,055 (RV)	± 2.38%	40%	52%	–	8%
Emerson College	Nov 17–20, 2019	1,092 (RV)	± 2.9%	49%	50%	–	–
Morning Consult	Nov 8, 2019	1,300 (RV)	± 3%	40%	45%	–	16%
YouGov/Hofstra University	Oct 25–31, 2019	1,500 (LV)	± 3%	48.8%	51.2%	–	–
ABC/Washington Post	Oct 27–30, 2019	876 (RV)	± 4%	41%	55%	3%	0%
FOX News	Oct 27–30, 2019	1,040 (RV)	± 3%	41%	49%	6% (Note: "Other" with 5%; would not vote with 1%)	4%
IBD/TIPP	Oct 27–30, 2019	903 (A)	± 3.3%	44%	51%	–	–
Morning Consult/Politico	Oct 25–28, 2019	1,997 (RV)	± 2%	37%	39%	–	25%
Emerson College	Oct 18–21, 2019	1000 (RV)	± 3%	49%	51%	–	–
CNN/SSRS	Oct 17–20, 2019	892 (RV)	± 4.0%	43%	52%	3% (Note: "Other" with 1%; "neither" with 2%)	2% (Note: Listed as "no opinion")
Ipsos/Reuters	Oct 17–18, 2019	945 (RV)	± 3.6%	39%	44%	13%	7%
SurveyUSA	Oct 15–16, 2019	3,080 (RV)	± 2.1%	42%	50%	–	8%
Lord Ashcroft Polls	Oct 1–15, 2019	15,051 (A)	–	41%	59%	–	–
Fox News	Oct 6–8, 2019	1,003 (RV)	± 3.0%	40%	49%	6%	2%
Quinnipiac University	Oct 4–7, 2019	1,483 (RV)	± 3.1%	42%	49%	2%	4%
Zogby Analytics	Oct 1–3, 2019	887 (LV)	± 3.3%	46%	44%	–	10%
IBD/TIPP	Sep 26 – Oct 3, 2019	863 (RV)	± 3.5%	45%	49%	2%	3%
HarrisX	Oct 1–2, 2019	1,000 (RV)	–	37%	38%	15% (Note: "Other" with 10%; would not vote with 6%)	9%
Ipsos/Reuters	Sep 26–30, 2019	1,917 (RV)	± 2.6%	36%	43%	11%	7%
Ipsos/Reuters	Sep 23–24, 2019	876 (RV)	± 3.8%	39%	38%	13%	8%
Emerson College	Sep 21–23, 2019	1,019 (RV)	± 3.0%	51%	49%	–	–
Fox News	Sep 15–17, 2019	1,008 (RV)	± 3.0%	40%	48%	6%	2%
SurveyUSA	Sep 13–16, 2019	4,520 (RV)	± 1.6%	43%	48%	–	9%
ABC News/Washington Post	Sep 2–5, 2019	877 (RV)	± 4.0%	43%	52%	–	1%
IBD/TIPP	Aug 22–30, 2019	848 (RV)	–	45%	49%	2%	3%
Emerson College	Aug 24–26, 2019	1,458 (RV)	± 2.5%	48%	52%	–	–
Quinnipiac University	Aug 21–26, 2019	1,422 (RV)	± 3.1%	39%	53%	1%	4%
Morning Consult/Politico	Aug 16–18, 2019	1,998 (RV)	± 2.0%	35%	40%	–	25%
Fox News	Aug 11–13, 2019	1,013 (RV)	± 3.0%	39%	48%	7%	5%
SurveyUSA	Aug 1–5, 2019	5,459 (RV)	± 1.6%	42%	50%	–	8%
IBD/TIPP	Jul 25 – Aug 1, 2019	856 (RV)	–	45%	50%	2%	2%
Rasmussen Reports	Jul 21–25, Jul 28 – Aug 1, 2019	5,000 (LV)	± 1.5%	45%	46%	–	9%
Emerson College	Jul 27–29, 2019	1,233 (RV)	± 2.7%	49%	51%	–	–
HarrisX	Jul 25–26, 2019	1,000 (RV)	–	38%	39%	15% (Note: "Other" with 11%; would not vote with 4%)	8%
Fox News	Jul 21–23, 2019	1,004 (RV)	± 3.0%	40%	46%	6%	5%
NBC News/Wall Street Journal	Jul 7–9, 2019	800 (RV)	± 3.5%	43%	50%	4%	3%
Emerson College	Jul 6–8, 2019	1,100 (RV)	± 2.9%	49%	51%	–	–
ABC News/Washington Post	Jun 28 – Jul 1, 2019	875 (RV)	± 4.0%	48%	49%	0%	1%
Emerson College	Jun 21–24, 2019	1,096 (RV)	± 2.9%	45%	55%	–	–
HarrisX	Jun 22–23, 2019	1,001 (RV)	± 3.1%	40%	39%	13% (Note: "Other" with 10%; would not vote with 3%)	8%
Fox News	Jun 9–12, 2019	1,001 (RV)	± 3.0%	40%	49%	5%	5%
Ipsos/Daily Beast	Jun 10–11, 2019	1,005 (A)	± 2.5%	35%	47%	–	10%
Quinnipiac University	Jun 6–10, 2019	1,214 (RV)	± 3.5%	42%	51%	1%	4%
Morning Consult/Politico	Jun 7–9, 2019	1,991 (RV)	± 2.0%	32%	42%	–	26%
Ipsos/Reuters	May 29 – Jun 5, 2019	3,851 (RV)	± 1.8%	37%	46%	10%	5%
HarrisX	May 25–26, 2019	1,001 (RV)	± 3.1%	38%	38%	11%	8%
Change Research	May 18–21, 2019	2,904 (LV)	± 1.8%	46%	47%	6%	–
Fox News	May 11–14, 2019	1,008 (RV)	± 3.0%	41%	46%	5%	5%
Emerson College	May 10–13, 2019	1,006 (RV)	± 3.0%	46%	54%	–	–
Zogby Analytics	May 2–9, 2019	903 (LV)	–	40%	49%	–	12%
HarrisX	Apr 28–29, 2019	1,002 (RV)	± 3.1%	38%	37%	11%	8%
CNN/SSRS	Apr 25–28, 2019	456 (RV)	± 5.6%	44%	50%	0%	2%
Emerson College	Apr 11–14, 2019	914 (RV)	± 3.2%	48%	52%	–	–
Rasmussen Reports	Mar 31 – Apr 4, Apr 7–11, 2019	5,000 (LV)	± 1.5%	47%	44%	–	9%
Civiqs/Daily Kos	Apr 6–9, 2019	1,584 (RV)	± 2.7%	44%	45%	–	11%
HarrisX	Mar 31 – Apr 1, 2019	1,000 (RV)	± 3.1%	38%	41%	9%	7%
Public Policy Polling	Mar 27–28, 2019	846 (RV)	± 3.4%	41%	49%	–	9%
Fox News	Mar 17–20, 2019	1,002 (RV)	± 3.0%	41%	44%	6%	5%
Emerson College	Mar 17–18, 2019	1,153 (RV)	± 2.8%	49%	51%	–	–
HarrisX	Mar 17–18, 2019	1,001 (RV)	± 3.1%	35%	40%	11%	8%
Civiqs/Daily Kos	Mar 9–12, 2019	1,622 (A)	± 2.6%	44%	46%	–	10%
Change Research	Mar 8–10, 2019	4,049 (LV)	± 2.5%	46%	50%	–	–
D-CYFOR	Feb 22–23, 2019	1,000 (RV)	± 3.1%	41%	50%	–	9%
Emerson College	Feb 14–16, 2019	1,000 (RV)	± 3.0%	49%	51%	–	–
Change Research	Jan 31 – Feb 1, 2019	1,338 (LV)	± 2.7%	46%	48%	–	–
Public Policy Polling	Jan 19–21, 2019	760 (RV)	± 3.6%	41%	51%	–	8%
HarrisX	Dec 16–17, 2018	1,001 (RV)	± 3.1%	37%	38%	–	24%
Morning Consult/Politico	Aug 16–18, 2018	1,974 (RV)	± 2.0%	32%	44%	–	24%
Public Policy Polling	Jun 8–10, 2018	679 (RV)	± 3.8%	40%	49%	–	11%
Zogby Analytics	May 10–12, 2018	881 (LV)	± 3.2%	37%	48%	–	15%
Public Policy Polling	Mar 23–25, 2018	846 (RV)	± 3.4%	39%	55%	–	6%
Public Policy Polling	Feb 9–11, 2018	687 (RV)	± 3.7%	44%	48%	–	8%
CNN/SSRS	Jan 14–18, 2018	913 (RV)	± 3.8%	42%	55%	1%	1%
Zogby Analytics	Jan 12–15, 2018	847 (LV)	± 3.4%	39%	52%	–	10%
YouGov	Jan 9, 2018	865 (RV)	–	43%	48%	–	–
Public Policy Polling	Dec 11–12, 2017	862 (RV)	± 3.3%	40%	53%	–	6%
Morning Consult/Politico	Nov 16–19, 2017	2,586 (RV)	± 2.0%	36%	42%	–	22%
Public Policy Polling	Oct 27–29, 2017	572 (RV)	± 4.1%	38%	53%	–	9%
Zogby Analytics	Oct 19–25, 2017	1,514 (LV)	± 2.5%	40%	51%	–	9%
Public Policy Polling	Sep 22–25, 2017	865 (RV)	± 3.3%	40%	51%	–	9%
Public Policy Polling	Aug 18–21, 2017	887 (RV)	± 3.3%	38%	51%	–	11%
Public Policy Polling	Jul 14–17, 2017	836 (RV)	± 3.4%	39%	52%	–	9%
Public Policy Polling	Jun 9–11, 2017	811 (RV)	± 3.4%	41%	51%	–	8%
Public Policy Polling	May 12–14, 2017	692 (RV)	± 3.7%	39%	52%	–	9%
Public Policy Polling	Apr 17–18, 2017	648 (RV)	± 3.9%	41%	50%	–	8%
Public Policy Polling	Mar 27–28, 2017	677 (RV)	± 3.8%	41%	52%	–	7%

Tulsi Gabbard

Poll source	Date(s) administered	Sample size	Margin of error	Donald Trump (R)	Tulsi Gabbard (D)	Other	Undecided
SurveyUSA	Jan 14–16, 2020	4,069 (RV)	± 1.7%	44%	39%	–	17%
HarrisX	Aug 23–24, 2019	1,001 (RV)	–	38%	33%	17% (Note: "Other" with 10%; would not vote with 7%)	12%
HarrisX	Jul 26–27, 2019	1,001 (RV)	–	37%	27%	22% (Note: "Other" with 17%; would not vote with 6%)	13%
HarrisX	Jun 23–24, 2019	1,001 (RV)	± 3.1%	38%	25%	24% (Note: "Other" with 19%; would not vote with 5%)	14%
HarrisX	May 26–27, 2019	1,003 (RV)	± 3.1%	38%	26%	17%	13%
HarrisX	Apr 30 – May 1, 2019	1,000 (RV)	± 3.1%	39%	24%	18%	12%
HarrisX	Apr 3–4, 2019	1,002 (RV)	± 3.1%	38%	25%	14%	16%
HarrisX	Mar 19–20, 2019	1,001 (RV)	± 3.1%	35%	27%	14%	16%

Elizabeth Warren

Poll source	Date(s) administered	Sample size	Margin of error	Donald Trump (R)	Elizabeth Warren (D)	Other	Undecided
IBD/TIPP	Feb 20–29, 2020	839 (RV)	–	46%	48%	3%	3%
Harvard-Harris	Feb 26–28, 2020	644 (RV)	–	49%	51%	–	–
YouGov/Yahoo News	Feb 26–27, 2020	1,662 (RV)	–	43%	47%	6% (Note: "Third party candidate" with 5%; would not vote with 1%)	4%
Morning Consult	Feb 23–27, 2020	6,117 (RV)	± 1%	43%	42%	–	14%
Fox News	Feb 23–26, 2020	1,000 (RV)	± 3.0%	43%	46%	7% (Note: "Other" with 3%; would not vote with 4%)	4%
Ipsos/Reuters	Feb 19–25, 2020	3,809 (RV)	± 1.8%	41%	44%	–	–
YouGov/CBS News	Feb 20–22, 2020	10,000 (RV)	± 1.2%	45%	46%	4%	4%
Saint Leo University	Feb 17–22, 2020	1,000 (A)	± 3%	40.6%	42.7%	–	16.7%
ABC News/Washington Post	Feb 14–17, 2020	913 (RV)	± 4%	47%	48%	3%	0%
Ipsos/Reuters	Feb 14–17, 2020	947 (RV)	± 3.6%	41%	40%	13% (Note: "Neither/other" with 11%; would not vote with 2%)	6%
SurveyUSA	Feb 13–17, 2020	2,768 (RV)	± 1.9%	47%	46%	–	7%
Morning Consult	Feb 12–17, 2020	7,313 (RV)	± 1%	42%	44%	–	14%
NPR/PBS News/Marist College	Feb 13–16, 2020	1,164 (RV)	± 3.7%	46%	47%	2%	5%
Ipsos/Reuters	Feb 6–10, 2020	952 (RV)	±3.6%	42%	42%	10% (Note: "Neither/other" with 10%; would not vote with 2%)	4%
Quinnipiac	Feb 5–9, 2020	1,159 (RV)	± 2.5%	44%	48%	4%	3%
Morning Consult	Feb 4–9, 2020	36,180 (RV)	± 1%	43%	43%	–	14%
Atlas Intel	Jan 30 – Feb 2, 2020	1,600 (RV)	2%	45.7%	42.5%	–	11.8%
Morning Consult	Jan 27 – Feb 2, 2020	7,178 (RV)	± 1%	42%	43%	–	15%
IBD/TIPP	Jan 23–30, 2020	856 (RV)	–	50%	46%	4%	1%
NBC/WSJ	Jan 26–29, 2020	1,000 (RV)	± 3.1%	45%	48%	5%	2%
USC Dornlife/LA Times	Jan 15–28, 2020	4,869 (RV)	± 2%	41%	45%	9% (Note: "Some other party's candidate" with 9%)	6%
Morning Consult	Jan 20–26, 2020	8,399 (RV)	± 1%	43%	43%	–	14%
Emerson College	Jan 21–23, 2020	1,128 (RV)	± 2.8%	50%	50%	–	–
ABC News/Washington Post	Jan 20–23, 2020	880 (RV)	± 4%	48%	48%	4% (Note: "Other" with 0%; "neither" with 2%; would not vote with 2%)	0%
Fox News	Jan 19–22, 2020	1,005 (RV)	± 3%	42%	47%	9% (Note: "Other" with 6%; would not vote with 3%)	3%
CNN/SSRS	Jan 16–19, 2020	1,051 (RV)	± 3.4%	45%	50%	3% (Note: "Other" with 0%; "neither" with 3%)	2%
Morning Consult	Jan 15–19, 2020	5,944 (RV)	± 1%	42%	44%	–	14%
Zogby Analytics	Jan 15–16, 2020	882 (LV)	–	47%	42%	–	10%
SurveyUSA	Jan 14–16, 2020	4,069 (RV)	± 1.7%	45%	48%	–	6%
Morning Consult	Jan 6–12, 2020	8,299 (RV)	± 1%	41%	43%	–	15%
IBD/TIPP	Jan 3–11, 2020	901 (RV)	± 3.3%	47%	46%	4% (Note: "Other" and "refused" with 2%)	2%
Morning Consult	Dec 30, 2019 – Jan 5, 2020	8,436 (RV)	± 1%	42%	41%	–	16%
Ipsos/Reuters	Dec 18–19, 2019	1,117 (A)	± 3.3%	35%	39%	17% (Note: "Neither/other" with 10%; would not vote with 7%)	9%
Ipsos/Reuters	Dec 18–19, 2019	1,108 (A)	± 3.4%	38%	36%	20% (Note: "Neither/other" with 12%; would not vote with 8%)	7%
Emerson College	Dec 15–17, 2019	1,222 (RV)	± 2.7%	49%	51%	–	–
CNN/ORC	Dec 12–15, 2019	1,005 (RV)	± 3.7%	46%	47%	1%	3%
IBD/TIPP	Dec 6–14, 2019	905 (RV)	± 3.3%	49%	44%	2% (Note: "Other" with 3%; "refused" with 2%)	2%
Fox News	Dec 8–11, 2019	1,000 (RV)	± 3.0%	45%	46%	2%	3%
Quinnipiac	Dec 4–9, 2019	1,553 (RV)	± 2.5%	43%	50%	4%	3%
Zogby Analytics	Dec 5–8, 2019	865 (LV)	± 3.3%	47%	43%	–	–
SurveyUSA	Nov 20–21, 2019	3,850 (RV)	± 1.7%	42%	49%	–	9%
RealClear Opinion Research	Nov 15–21, 2019	2,055 (RV)	± 2.38%	41%	50%	–	10%
Emerson College	Nov 17–20, 2019	1,092 (RV)	± 2.9%	50%	50%	–	–
Morning Consult	Nov 8, 2019	1,300 (RV)	± 3%	39%	45%	–	15%
YouGov/Hofstra University	Oct 25–31, 2019	1,500 (LV)	± 3%	50%	50%	–	–
ABC/Washington Post	Oct 27–30, 2019	876 (RV)	± 4%	40%	55%	4%	1%
FOX News	Oct 27–30, 2019	1,040 (RV)	± 3%	41%	46%	9% (Note: "Other" with 7%; would not vote with 2%)	4%
IBD/TIPP	Oct 27–30, 2019	903 (A)	± 3.3%	44%	52%	–	–
NBC News/Wall Street Journal	Oct 27–30, 2019	720 (RV)	± 3.7%	42%	50%	3% (Note: "Neither/other" with 3%)	3%
Morning Consult/Politico	Oct 25–28, 2019	1,997 (RV)	± 2%	36%	35%	–	28%
Emerson College	Oct 18–21, 2019	1000 (RV)	± 3%	49%	51%	–	–
Ipsos/Reuters	Oct 17–18, 2019	945 (RV)	± 3.6%	40%	43%	11% (Note: "Neither/other" with 8%; would not vote with 3%)	6%
CNN/SSRS	Oct 17–20, 2019	892 (RV)	± 4.0%	44%	52%	3% (Note: "Neither" with 3%)	1%
SurveyUSA	Oct 15–16, 2019	3,080 (RV)	± 2.1%	44%	48%	–	8%
Lord Ashcroft Polls	Oct 1–15, 2019	15,051 (A)	–	43%	57%	–	–
Fox News	Oct 6–8, 2019	1,040 (RV)	± 3.0%	40%	50%	4%	4%
Quinnipiac University	Oct 4–7, 2019	1,483 (RV)	± 3.1%	41%	49%	2%	4%
Zogby Analytics	Oct 1–3, 2019	887 (LV)	± 3.3%	45%	45%	–	10%
IBD/TIPP	Sep 26 – Oct 3, 2019	863 (RV)	± 3.5%	46%	48%	2%	3%
HarrisX	Oct 1–2, 2019	1000 (RV)	–	37%	37%	15% (Note: "Other" with 8%; would not vote with 7%)	10%
Ipsos/Reuters	Sep 26–30, 2019	1,917 (RV)	± 2.6%	37%	42%	10%	8%
Ipsos/Reuters	Sep 23–24, 2019	876 (RV)	± 3.8%	39%	41%	10%	8%
Emerson College	Sep 21–23, 2019	1,019 (RV)	± 3.0%	49%	51%	–	–
Fox News	Sep 15–17, 2019	1,008 (RV)	± 3.0%	40%	46%	7%	3%
SurveyUSA	Sep 13–16, 2019	4,520 (RV)	± 1.6%	43%	45%	–	12%
Marquette University Law School	Sep 3–13, 2019	1,389 (RV)	–	36% (Note: 7% said they'd probably (as opposed to definitely) vote for Trump)	41% (Note: 9% said they'd probably (as opposed to definitely) vote for Warren)	24% (Note: "Someone else" with 17%; would not vote with 6%; no answer with 1%)	– (Note: See Warren and Trump notes)
ABC News/Washington Post	Sep 2–5, 2019	877 (RV)	± 4.0%	44%	51%	–	2%
IBD/TIPP	Aug 22–30, 2019	848 (RV)	–	46%	49%	1%	3%
Emerson College	Aug 24–26, 2019	1,458 (RV)	± 2.5%	50%	50%	–	–
Quinnipiac University	Aug 21–26, 2019	1,422 (RV)	± 3.1%	40%	52%	1%	4%
Morning Consult	Aug 16–18, 2019	1,998 (RV)	± 2.0%	35%	35%	–	30%
Fox News	Aug 11–13, 2019	1,013 (RV)	± 3.0%	39%	46%	7%	6%
SurveyUSA	Aug 1–5, 2019	5,459 (RV)	± 1.6%	44%	46%	–	10%
IBD/TIPP	Jul 25 – Aug 1, 2019	856 (RV)	–	45%	49%	2%	4%
Emerson College	Jul 27–29, 2019	1,233 (RV)	± 2.7%	50%	50%	–	–
HarrisX	Jul 25–26, 2019	1,000 (RV)	–	40%	36%	15% (Note: "Other" with 10%; would not vote with 5%)	9%
Fox News	Jul 21–23, 2019	1,004 (RV)	± 3.0%	42%	41%	7%	7%
NBC News/Wall Street Journal	Jul 7–9, 2019	800 (RV)	± 3.5%	43%	48%	4%	4%
Emerson College	Jul 6–8, 2019	1,100 (RV)	± 2.9%	51%	49%	–	–
ABC News/Washington Post	Jun 28 – Jul 1, 2019	875 (RV)	± 4.0%	48%	48%	1%	1%
Emerson College	Jun 21–24, 2019	1,096 (RV)	± 2.9%	47%	53%	–	–
HarrisX	Jun 22–23, 2019	1,001 (RV)	± 3.1%	41%	33%	16% (Note: "Other" with 12%; would not vote with 4%)	10%
Fox News	Jun 9–12, 2019	1,001 (RV)	± 3.0%	41%	43%	6%	6%
Ipsos/Daily Beast	Jun 10–11, 2019	1,005 (A)	± 2.5%	36%	42%	–	12%
Quinnipiac University	Jun 6–10, 2019	1,214 (RV)	± 3.5%	42%	49%	1%	5%
Morning Consult	Jun 7–9, 2019	1,991 (RV)	± 2.0%	33%	32%	–	35%
Ipsos/Reuters	May 29 – Jun 5, 2019	3,851 (RV)	± 1.8%	38%	43%	11%	5%
HarrisX	May 25–26, 2019	1,001 (RV)	± 3.1%	40%	33%	11%	10%
Rasmussen Reports	May 12–16, May 19–23, 2019	5,000 (LV)	± 1.5%	44%	46%	–	10%
Change Research	May 18–21, 2019	2,904 (LV)	± 1.8%	46%	47%	6%	–
Civiqs/Daily Kos	May 12–14, 2019	1,650 (A)	± 2.6%	45%	48%	–	7%
Fox News	May 11–14, 2019	1,008 (RV)	± 3.0%	41%	43%	6%	6%
Emerson College	May 10–13, 2019	1,006 (RV)	± 3.0%	48%	51%	–	–
Zogby Analytics	May 2–9, 2019	903 (LV)	–	41%	43%	–	16%
HarrisX	Apr 28–29, 2019	1,002 (RV)	± 3.1%	39%	33%	13%	9%
CNN/SSRS	Apr 25–28, 2019	452 (RV)	± 5.6%	48%	47%	0%	3%
Emerson College	Apr 11–14, 2019	914 (RV)	± 3.2%	52%	48%	–	–
Civiqs/Daily Kos	Apr 6–9, 2019	1,584 (RV)	± 2.7%	45%	43%	–	12%
HarrisX	Mar 31 – Apr 1, 2019	1,000 (RV)	± 3.1%	39%	35%	12%	11%
Public Policy Polling	Mar 27–28, 2019	846 (RV)	± 3.4%	42%	48%	–	10%
Fox News	Mar 17–20, 2019	1,002 (RV)	± 3.0%	42%	40%	7%	8%
Emerson College	Mar 17–18, 2019	1,153 (RV)	± 2.8%	49%	51%	–	–
HarrisX	Mar 17–18, 2019	1,001 (RV)	± 3.1%	37%	34%	12%	12%
Civiqs/Daily Kos	Mar 9–12, 2019	1,622 (A)	± 2.6%	44%	44%	–	11%
Change Research	Mar 8–10, 2019	4,049 (LV)	± 2.5%	47%	49%	–	–
D-CYFOR	Feb 22–23, 2019	1,000 (RV)	± 3.1%	42%	45%	–	13%
Emerson College	Feb 14–16, 2019	1,000 (RV)	± 3.0%	47%	53%	–	–
Change Research	Jan 31 – Feb 1, 2019	1,338 (LV)	± 2.7%	46%	47%	–	–
Public Policy Polling	Jan 19–21, 2019	760 (RV)	± 3.6%	42%	48%	–	10%
SurveyMonkey/Axios	Oct 24–29, 2018	3,064 (RV)	–	47%	49%	–	4%
Rasmussen Reports	Oct 17–18, 2018	1,000 (LV)	± 3.0%	44%	46%	–	9%
Morning Consult/Politico	Aug 16–18, 2018	1,974 (RV)	± 2.0%	30%	34%	–	36%
Public Policy Polling	Jun 8–10, 2018	679 (RV)	± 3.8%	40%	48%	–	12%
Zogby Analytics	May 10–12, 2018	881 (LV)	± 3.2%	37%	43%	–	20%
Public Policy Polling	Mar 23–25, 2018	846 (RV)	± 3.4%	40%	51%	–	9%
Public Policy Polling	Feb 9–11, 2018	687 (RV)	± 3.7%	44%	44%	–	12%
Zogby Analytics	Jan 12–15, 2018	847 (LV)	± 3.4%	40%	50%	–	10%
Public Policy Polling (D) (Note: Poll sponsored by the Progressive Change Campaign Committee (PCCC))	Jan 9–10, 2018	620 (RV)	± 3.9%	43%	49%	–	8%
Public Policy Polling	Dec 11–12, 2017	862 (RV)	± 3.3%	42%	51%	–	7%
Public Policy Polling	Oct 27–29, 2017	572 (RV)	± 4.1%	40%	50%	–	9%
Zogby Analytics	Oct 19–25, 2017	1,514 (LV)	± 2.5%	43%	45%	–	13%
Emerson College	Oct 12–14, 2017	820 (RV)	± 3.4%	44%	44%	–	12%
GQR Research	Sep 3 – Oct 6, 2017	653 (LV)	–	44%	52%	2% (Note: "Other candidate" and would not vote with 1%; "refused" with 0%)	2%
Public Policy Polling	Sep 22–25, 2017	865 (RV)	± 3.3%	41%	47%	–	12%
Public Policy Polling	Aug 18–21, 2017	887 (RV)	± 3.3%	40%	45%	–	15%
Zogby Analytics	Aug 4–7, 2017	1,300 (LV)	–	37%	46%	–	17%
Public Policy Polling	Jul 14–17, 2017	836 (RV)	± 3.4%	42%	49%	–	9%
Public Policy Polling	Jun 9–11, 2017	811 (RV)	± 3.4%	43%	46%	–	11%
Public Policy Polling	May 12–14, 2017	692 (RV)	± 3.7%	39%	49%	–	12%
Public Policy Polling	Apr 17–18, 2017	648 (RV)	± 3.9%	42%	46%	–	13%
Public Policy Polling	Mar 27–28, 2017	677 (RV)	± 3.8%	43%	48%	–	9%
Morning Consult/Politico	Feb 9–10, 2017	1,791 (RV)	± 2.0%	42%	36%	–	22%

Michael Bloomberg

Poll source	Date(s) administered	Sample size	Margin of error	Donald Trump (R)	Michael Bloomberg (D)	Other	Undecided
IBD/TIPP	Feb 20–29, 2020	839 (RV)	–	45%	48%	3%	3%
Harvard-Harris	Feb 26–28, 2020	654 (RV)	–	45%	55%	–	–
Morning Consult	Feb 23–27, 2020	6,117 (RV)	± 1%	42%	43%	–	15%
YouGov/Yahoo News	Feb 26–27, 2020	1,662 (RV)	–	41%	43%	9% (Note: "Third party candidate" with 7%; would not vote with 2%)	6%
Fox News	Feb 23–26, 2020	1,000 (RV)	± 3.0%	40%	48%	7% (Note: "Other" with 2%; would not vote with 5%)	5%
Ipsos/Reuters	Feb 19–25, 2020	3,809 (RV)	± 1.8%	39%	43%	–	–
CBS News/YouGov	Feb 20–22, 2020	10,000 (RV)	± 1.2%	45%	42%	7% (Note: "Someone else/third party" with 6%; would not vote with 1%)	6%
Saint Leo University	Feb 17–22, 2020	1,000 (A)	± 3%	34%	50%	–	16%
Emerson College	Feb 16–18, 2020	1,250 (RV)	± 2.7%	51%	49%	–	–
Ipsos/Reuters	Feb 14–17, 2020	947 (RV)	± 3.6%	38%	44%	11%	7%
ABC News/Washington Post	Feb 14–17, 2020	913 (RV)	± 4%	45%	50%	3%	1%
NBC News/Wall Street Journal	Feb 14–17, 2020	900 (RV)	± 3.3%	43%	50%	–	–
SurveyUSA	Feb 13–17, 2020	2,768 (RV)	± 1.9%	43%	50%	–	7%
Morning Consult	Feb 12–17, 2020	7,313 (RV)	± 1%	42%	46%	–	12%
NPR/PBS News/Marist College	Feb 13–16, 2020	1,164 (RV)	± 3.7%	44%	48%	2%	6%
Ipsos/Reuters	Feb 6–10, 2020	952 (RV)	±3.6%	41%	45%	10% (Note: "Neither/other" with 7%; would not vote with 3%)	5%
Quinnipiac	Feb 5–9, 2020	1,159 (RV)	± 2.5%	42%	51%	5%	2%
Morning Consult	Feb 4–9, 2020	36,180 (RV)	± 1%	41%	46%	–	13%
Atlas Intel	Jan 30 – Feb 2, 2020	1,600 (RV)	2%	44.6%	43.2%	–	12.2%
Morning Consult	Jan 27 – Feb 2, 2020	7,178 (RV)	± 1%	40%	47%	–	13%
IBD/TIPP	Jan 23–30, 2020	856 (RV)	–	47%	48%	3%	2%
Morning Consult	Jan 20–26, 2020	8,399 (RV)	± 1%	41%	45%	–	14%
ABC News/Washington Post	Jan 20–23, 2020	880 (RV)	± 4%	46%	49%	4% (Note: "Other" with 1%; "neither" with 2%; would not vote with 1%)	1%
Fox News	Jan 19–22, 2020	1,005 (RV)	± 3%	41%	49%	7%	3%
CNN/SSRS	Jan 16–19, 2020	1,051 (RV)	± 3.4%	43%	52%	3%	2%
Morning Consult	Jan 15–19, 2020	5,944 (RV)	± 1%	42%	43%	–	15%
Zogby Analytics	Jan 15–16, 2020	882 (LV)	–	43%	45%	–	12%
SurveyUSA	Jan 14–16, 2020	4,069 (RV)	± 1.7%	42%	49%	–	9%
Morning Consult	Jan 6–12, 2020	8,299 (RV)	± 1%	42%	43%	–	15%
IBD/TIPP	Jan 3–11, 2020	901 (RV)	± 3.3%	45%	47%	5%	3%
Morning Consult	Dec 30, 2019 – Jan 5, 2020	8,436 (RV)	± 1%	41%	43%	–	17%
Ipsos/Reuters	Dec 18–19, 2019	1,117 (A)	± 3.3%	35%	36%	19% (Note: "Neither/other" with 12%; would not vote with 7%)	10%
IBD/TIPP	Dec 6–14, 2019	905 (RV)	± 3.3%	47%	46%	5% (Note: "Other" with 4%; "refused" with 1%)	3%
Fox News	Dec 8–11, 2019	1,000 (RV)	± 3.0%	40%	45%	3%	7%
Quinnipiac	Dec 4–9, 2019	1,553 (RV)	± 2.5%	42%	48%	5%	5%
Zogby Analytics	Dec 5–8, 2019	865 (LV)	± 3.3%	44%	43%	–	–
SurveyUSA	Nov 20–21, 2019	3,850 (RV)	± 1.7%	40%	46%	–	14%
Morning Consult	Nov 8, 2019	1,300 (RV)	± 3%	37%	43%	–	21%
YouGov/Hofstra University	Oct 25–31, 2019	1,500 (LV)	± 3%	45%	42.1%	–	12.9%
Rasmussen Reports	Jan 30–31, 2019	1,000 (LV)	± 3.0%	40%	46%	–	14%
Zogby Analytics	Oct 15–17, 2018	848 (LV)	± 3.4%	40%	43%	–	16%

Amy Klobuchar

Poll source	Date(s) administered	Sample size	Margin of error	Donald Trump (R)	Amy Klobuchar (D)	Other	Undecided
IBD/TIPP	Feb 20–29, 2020	839 (RV)	–	46%	46%	3%	4%
Fox News	Feb 23–26, 2020	1,000 (RV)	± 3.0%	43%	44%	7%	6%
Ipsos/Reuters	Feb 19–25, 2020	3,809 (RV)	± 1.8%	40%	42%	–	–
YouGov/CBS News	Feb 20–22, 2020	10,000 (RV)	± 1.2%	44%	45%	6% (Note: "Someone else/third party" with 5%; would not vote with 1%)	5%
Saint Leo University	Feb 17–22, 2020	1,000 (A)	± 3%	37.4%	43.9%	–	18.7%
Emerson College	Feb 16–18, 2020	1,250 (RV)	± 2.7%	51%	49%	–	–
Ipsos/Reuters	Feb 14–17, 2020	947 (RV)	± 3.6%	39%	40%	14% (Note: "Neither/other" with 12%; would not vote with 2%)	7%
ABC News/Washington Post	Feb 14–17, 2020	913 (RV)	± 4%	46%	48%	4% (Note: "Other" with 0%; "neither" with 3%; would not vote with 1%)	1%
NBC News/Wall Street Journal	Feb 14–17, 2020	900 (RV)	± 3.3%	45%	48%	–	–
SurveyUSA	Feb 13–17, 2020	2,768 (RV)	± 1.9%	46%	44%	–	10%
NPR/PBS News/Marist College	Feb 13–16, 2020	1,164 (RV)	± 3.7%	45%	47%	2%	6%
Quinnipiac	Feb 5–9, 2020	1,159 (RV)	± 2.5%	43%	49%	4%	4%
USC Dornlife/LA Times	Jan 15–28, 2020	4,869 (RV)	± 2%	40%	42%	11% (Note: "Some other party's candidate" with 11%)	7%
ABC News/Washington Post	Jan 20–23, 2020	880 (RV)	± 4%	47%	48%	4%	2%
Fox News	Jan 19–22, 2020	1,005 (RV)	± 3%	42%	43%	10% (Note: "Other" with 7%; would not vote with 3%)	4%
CNN/SSRS	Jan 16–19, 2020	1,051 (RV)	± 3.4%	45%	48%	3%	3%
Zogby Analytics	Jan 15–16, 2020	882 (LV)	–	47%	40%	–	13%
SurveyUSA	Jan 14–16, 2020	4,069 (RV)	± 1.7%	45%	43%	–	12%
Quinnipiac	Dec 4–9, 2019	1,553 (RV)	± 2.5%	43%	47%	4%	5%
HarrisX	Oct 1–2, 2019	1000 (RV)	–	38%	30%	20% (Note: "Other" with 13%; would not vote with 7%)	13%
HarrisX	Jul 25–26, 2019	1,000 (RV)	–	40%	28%	20%	13%
HarrisX	Jun 22–23, 2019	1,001 (RV)	± 3.1%	41%	30%	18% (Note: "Other" with 13%; would not vote with 4%)	11%
Ipsos/Daily Beast	Jun 10–11, 2019	1,005 (A)	± 2.5%	36%	34%	–	15%
HarrisX	May 26–27, 2019	1,003 (RV)	± 3.1%	37%	29%	16%	13%
HarrisX	Apr 30 – May 1, 2019	1,000 (RV)	± 3.1%	39%	27%	16%	12%
HarrisX	Apr 3–4, 2019	1,002 (RV)	± 3.1%	37%	30%	11%	15%
HarrisX	Mar 19–20, 2019	1,001 (RV)	± 3.1%	37%	30%	11%	14%
Emerson College	Feb 14–16, 2019	1,000 (RV)	± 3.0%	49%	52%	–	–
SurveyMonkey/Axios	Oct 28–30, 2018	2,994 (RV)	–	42%	51%	–	7%

Pete Buttigieg

Poll source	Date(s) administered	Sample size	Margin of error	Donald Trump (R)	Pete Buttigieg (D)	Other	Undecided
IBD/TIPP	Feb 20–29, 2020	839 (RV)	–	45%	48%	3% (Note: "Other" with 2%; would not vote with 1%)	3%
YouGov/Yahoo News	Feb 26–27, 2020	1,662 (RV)	–	43%	46%	7% (Note: "Third party candidate" with 5%; would not vote with 2%)	5%
Morning Consult	Feb 23–27, 2020	6,117 (RV)	± 1%	42%	43%	–	15%
Fox News	Feb 23–26, 2020	1,000 (RV)	± 3.0%	42%	45%	8% (Note: "Other" with 3%; would not vote with 5%)	6%
Ipsos/Reuters	Feb 19–25, 2020	3,809 (RV)	± 1.8%	40%	44%	–	–
YouGov/CBS News	Feb 20–22, 2020	10,000 (RV)	± 1.2%	44%	44%	6%	5%
Saint Leo University	Feb 17–22, 2020	1,000 (A)	± 3%	37.4%	45.8%	–	16.8%
Emerson College	Feb 16–18, 2020	1,250 (RV)	± 2.7%	51%	49%	–	–
Global Strategy Group/GBAO	Feb 14–17, 2020	600 (RV)	–	44%	50%	1% (Note: Would not vote with 1%)	4%
ABC News/Washington Post	Feb 14–17, 2020	913 (RV)	± 4%	46%	49%	5% (Note: "Other" with 1%; "neither" with 3%; would not vote with 1%)	1%
NBC News/Wall Street Journal	Feb 14–17, 2020	900 (RV)	± 3.3%	44%	48%	–	–
Ipsos/Reuters	Feb 14–17, 2020	947 (RV)	± 3.6%	40%	43%	11%	7%
SurveyUSA	Feb 13–17, 2020	2,768 (RV)	± 1.9%	45%	48%	–	8%
Morning Consult	Feb 12–17, 2020	7,313 (RV)	± 1%	42%	44%	–	15%
NPR/PBS News/Marist College	Feb 13–16, 2020	1,164 (RV)	± 3.7%	45%	47%	2%	7%
Ipsos/Reuters	Feb 6–10, 2020	952 (RV)	±3.6%	41%	41%	12% (Note: "Neither/other" with 9%; would not vote with 3%)	5%
Quinnipiac	Feb 5–9, 2020	1,159 (RV)	± 2.5%	43%	47%	5%	5%
Morning Consult	Feb 4–9, 2020	36,180 (RV)	± 1%	42%	43%	–	15%
Atlas Intel	Jan 30 – Feb 2, 2020	1,600 (RV)	2%	44.3%	44.6%	–	11.1%
Morning Consult	Jan 27 – Feb 2, 2020	7,178 (RV)	± 1%	41%	42%	–	17%
IBD/TIPP	Jan 23–30, 2020	856 (RV)	–	48%	45%	4%	3%
NBC/WSJ	Jan 26–29, 2020	1,000 (RV)	± 3.1%	44%	45%	6% (Note: "Neither/other" with 6%)	3%
USC Dornlife/LA Times	Jan 15–28, 2020	4,869 (RV)	± 2%	40%	43%	10% (Note: "Some other party's candidate" with 10%)	7%
Morning Consult	Jan 20–26, 2020	8,399 (RV)	± 1%	41%	43%	–	16%
Emerson College	Jan 21–23, 2020	1,128 (RV)	± 2.8%	52%	49%	–	–
ABC News/Washington Post	Jan 20–23, 2020	880 (RV)	± 4%	48%	45%	5% (Note: "Other" with 0%; "neither" with 3%; would not vote with 2%)	1%
CNN/SSRS	Jan 16–19, 2020	1,051 (RV)	± 3.4%	45%	49%	3%	2%
Morning Consult	Jan 15–19, 2020	5,944 (RV)	± 1%	42%	41%	–	17%
Zogby Analytics	Jan 15–16, 2020	882 (LV)	–	46%	41%	–	13%
SurveyUSA	Jan 14–16, 2020	4,069 (RV)	± 1.7%	44%	47%	–	9%
Morning Consult	Jan 6–12, 2020	8,299 (RV)	± 1%	42%	42%	–	13%
IBD/TIPP	Jan 3–11, 2020	901 (RV)	± 3.3%	46%	47%	4%	3%
Morning Consult	Dec 30, 2019 – Jan 5, 2020	8,436 (RV)	± 1%	41%	42%	–	17%
Ipsos/Reuters	Dec 18–19, 2019	1,117 (A)	± 3.3%	36%	35%	20% (Note: "Neither/other" with 11%; would not vote with 9%)	10%
Emerson College	Dec 15–17, 2019	1,222 (RV)	± 2.7%	50%	50%	–	–
CNN/ORC	Dec 12–15, 2019	1,005 (RV)	± 3.7%	46%	45%	1%	5%
USA TODAY/Suffolk	Dec 10–14, 2019	1,000 (RV)	± 3.0%	43%	33%	0%	24%
IBD/TIPP	Dec 6–14, 2019	905 (RV)	± 3.3%	46%	44%	5%	4%
Fox News	Dec 8–11, 2019	1,000 (RV)	± 3.0%	42%	43%	3%	7%
Quinnipiac	Dec 4–9, 2019	1,553 (RV)	± 2.5%	43%	48%	4%	3%
Zogby Analytics	Dec 5–8, 2019	865 (LV)	± 3.3%	45%	41%	–	–
SurveyUSA	Nov 20–21, 2019	3,850 (RV)	± 1.7%	41%	48%	–	11%
RealClear Opinion Research	Nov 15–21, 2019	2,055 (RV)	± 2.38%	40%	45%	–	15%
Emerson College	Nov 17–20, 2019	1,092 (RV)	± 2.9%	52%	48%	–	–
ABC/Washington Post	Oct 27–30, 2019	876 (RV)	± 4%	41%	52%	6% (Note: "Other" with 1%; "neither" with 3%; would not vote with 2%)	1%
Fox News	Oct 27–30, 2019	1,040 (RV)	± 3%	41%	41%	11% (Note: "Other" with 9%; would not vote with 2%)	6%
Morning Consult/Politico	Oct 25–28, 2019	1,997 (RV)	± 2%	35%	29%	–	36%
CNN/SSRS	Oct 17–20, 2019	892 (RV)	± 4.0%	44%	50%	4% (Note: "Other" with 1%; "neither" with 3%)	2%
SurveyUSA	Oct 15–16, 2019	3,080 (RV)	± 2.1%	43%	44%	–	13%
Lord Ashcroft Polls	Oct 1–15, 2019	15,051 (A)	–	44%	56%	–	–
Zogby Analytics	Oct 1–3, 2019	887 (LV)	± 3.3%	49%	38%	–	13%
HarrisX	Oct 1–2, 2019	1000 (RV)	–	37%	32%	18% (Note: "Other" with 10%; would not vote with 8%)	13%
ABC News/Washington Post	Sep 2–5, 2019	877 (RV)	± 4.0%	43%	47%	–	4%
Emerson College	Aug 24–26, 2019	1,458 (RV)	± 2.5%	51%	49%	–	–
Quinnipiac University	Aug 21–26, 2019	1,422 (RV)	± 3.1%	40%	49%	2%	7%
SurveyUSA	Aug 1–5, 2019	5,459 (RV)	± 1.6%	44%	42%	–	14%
Emerson College	Jul 27–29, 2019	1,233 (RV)	± 2.7%	52%	48%	–	–
HarrisX	July 25–26, 2019	1,000 (RV)	–	40%	30%	18% (Note: "Other" with 13%; would not vote with 5%)	12%
Emerson College	Jul 6–8, 2019	1,100 (RV)	± 2.9%	51%	49%	–	–
ABC News/Washington Post	Jun 28 – Jul 1, 2019	875 (RV)	± 4.0%	47%	47%	1%	3%
Emerson College	Jun 21–24, 2019	1,096 (RV)	± 2.9%	48%	52%	–	–
HarrisX	Jun 22–23, 2019	1,001 (RV)	± 3.1%	41%	31%	15%	12%
Fox News	Jun 9–12, 2019	1,001 (RV)	± 3.0%	40%	41%	7%	9%
Ipsos/Daily Beast	Jun 10–11, 2019	1,005 (A)	± 2.5%	36%	34%	–	14%
Quinnipiac University	Jun 6–10, 2019	1,214 (RV)	± 3.5%	42%	47%	1%	7%
Morning Consult/Politico	Jun 7–9, 2019	1,991 (RV)	± 2.0%	31%	27%	–	42%
Ipsos/Reuters	May 29 – Jun 5, 2019	3,851 (RV)	± 1.8%	37%	39%	12%	7%
HarrisX	May 26–27, 2019	1,003 (RV)	± 3.1%	38%	31%	13%	14%
Change Research	May 18–21, 2019	2,904 (LV)	± 1.8%	46%	44%	9%	–
Fox News	May 11–14, 2019	1,008 (RV)	± 3.0%	41%	40%	7%	8%
Emerson College	May 10–13, 2019	1,006 (RV)	± 3.0%	50%	50%	–	–
Zogby Analytics	May 2–9, 2019	903 (LV)	–	41%	41%	–	17%
HarrisX	Apr 30 – May 1, 2019	1,000 (RV)	± 3.1%	40%	29%	14%	12%
CNN/SSRS	Apr 25–28, 2019	439 (RV)	± 5.7%	44%	47%	1%	6%
Rasmussen Reports	Apr 14–25, 2019	5,000 (LV)	± 1.5%	44%	40%	–	16%
Emerson College	Apr 11–14, 2019	914 (RV)	± 3.2%	51%	49%	–	–
HarrisX	Apr 3–4, 2019	1,002 (RV)	± 3.1%	37%	28%	13%	15%
Public Policy Polling	Mar 27–28, 2019	846 (RV)	± 3.4%	41%	45%	–	14%
HarrisX	Mar 19–20, 2019	1,001 (RV)	± 3.1%	36%	27%	13%	16%

Tom Steyer

Poll source	Date(s) administered	Sample size	Margin of error	Donald Trump (R)	Tom Steyer (D)	Other	Undecided
SurveyUSA	Feb 13–17, 2020	2,768 (RV)	± 1.9%	47%	42%	–	11%
SurveyUSA	Jan 14–16, 2020	4,069 (RV)	± 1.7%	44%	44%	–	12%
HarrisX	Oct 1–2, 2019	1,000 (RV)	–	37%	28%	20%	15%
HarrisX	Aug 23–24, 2019	1,001 (RV)	–	38%	32%	18% (Note: "Other" with 11%; would not vote with 7%)	12%
HarrisX	Jul 26–27, 2019	1,001 (RV)	–	36%	28%	22% (Note: "Other" with 16%; would not vote with 6%)	15%

Michael Bennet

Poll source	Date(s) administered	Sample size	Margin of error	Donald Trump (R)	Michael Bennet (D)	Other	Undecided
HarrisX	Aug 23–24, 2019	1,001 (RV)	–	37%	31%	20% (Note: "Other" with 14%; would not vote with 6%)	12%
HarrisX	Jul 26–27, 2019	1,001 (RV)	–	37%	28%	22% (Note: "Other" with 17%; would not vote with 5%)	13%
HarrisX	Jun 23–24, 2019	1,001 (RV)	± 3.1%	37%	26%	24% (Note: "Other" with 18%; would not vote with 5%)	13%

Andrew Yang

Poll source	Date(s) administered	Sample size	Margin of error	Donald Trump (R)	Andrew Yang (D)	Other	Undecided
SurveyUSA	Jan 14–16, 2020	4,069 (RV)	± 1.7%	44%	46%	–	10%
HarrisX	Oct 1–2, 2019	1,000 (RV)	–	38%	31%	19% (Note: "Other" with 12%; would not vote with 8%)	12%
HarrisX	Aug 23–24, 2019	1,001 (RV)	–	37%	33%	18% (Note: "Other" with 12%; would not vote with 6%)	12%
HarrisX	Jul 26–27, 2019	1,001 (RV)	–	37%	27%	23%	13%
HarrisX	Jun 23–24, 2019	1,001 (RV)	± 3.1%	38%	26%	23%	13%
HarrisX	May 26–27, 2019	1,003 (RV)	± 3.1%	37%	26%	18%	14%
HarrisX	Apr 30 – May 1, 2019	1,000 (RV)	± 3.1%	38%	26%	17%	12%
HarrisX	Apr 3–4, 2019	1,002 (RV)	± 3.1%	37%	25%	14%	16%
HarrisX	Mar 19–20, 2019	1,001 (RV)	± 3.1%	35%	27%	14%	16%

John Delaney

Poll source	Date(s) administered	Sample size	Margin of error	Donald Trump (R)	John Delaney (D)	Other	Undecided
HarrisX	Aug 23–24, 2019	1,001 (RV)	–	37%	32%	18%	13%
HarrisX	Jul 26–27, 2019	1,001 (RV)	–	36%	28%	22%	14%
HarrisX	Jun 23–24, 2019	1,001 (RV)	± 3.1%	37%	25%	24% (Note: "Other" with 18%; would not vote with 6%)	13%
HarrisX	May 26–27, 2019	1,003 (RV)	± 3.1%	36%	27%	17%	14%
HarrisX	Apr 30 – May 1, 2019	1,000 (RV)	± 3.1%	39%	26%	16%	12%
HarrisX	Apr 3–4, 2019	1,002 (RV)	± 3.1%	37%	27%	15%	14%
HarrisX	Mar 19–20, 2019	1,001 (RV)	± 3.1%	36%	28%	13%	15%
Morning Consult/Politico	Aug 16–18, 2018	1,974 (RV)	± 2.0%	28%	18%	–	53%
Public Policy Polling	Aug 18–21, 2017	887 (RV)	± 3.3%	38%	38%	–	24%

Cory Booker

Poll source	Date(s) administered	Sample size	Margin of error	Donald Trump (R)	Cory Booker (D)	Other	Undecided
HarrisX	Oct 1–2, 2019	1,000 (RV)	–	37%	33%	18%	12%
Morning Consult/Politico	Aug 16–18, 2019	1,998 (RV)	± 2.0%	35%	28%	–	37%
HarrisX	July 25–26, 2019	1,000 (RV)	–	40%	31%	18% (Note: "Other" with 12%; would not vote with 5%)	12%
HarrisX	Jun 22–23, 2019	1,001 (RV)	± 3.1%	41%	31%	18%	11%
Rasmussen Reports	Jun 9–20, 2019	5,000 (LV)	± 1.5%	45%	43%	–	12%
Quinnipiac University	Jun 6–10, 2019	1,214 (RV)	± 3.5%	42%	47%	1%	7%
Morning Consult/Politico	Jun 7–9, 2019	1,991 (RV)	± 2.0%	32%	28%	–	39%
HarrisX	May 25–26, 2019	1,001 (RV)	± 3.1%	39%	31%	13%	11%
Zogby Analytics	May 2–9, 2019	903 (LV)	–	41%	44%	–	15%
HarrisX	Apr 28–29, 2019	1,002 (RV)	± 3.1%	38%	30%	15%	10%
HarrisX	Mar 31 – Apr 1, 2019	1,000 (RV)	± 3.1%	38%	31%	14%	12%
Public Policy Polling	Mar 27–28, 2019	846 (RV)	± 3.4%	41%	48%	–	10%
HarrisX	Mar 17–18, 2019	1,001 (RV)	± 3.1%	37%	35%	11%	13%
Civiqs/Daily Kos	Mar 9–12, 2019	1,622 (A)	± 2.6%	44%	42%	–	15%
D-CYFOR	Feb 22–23, 2019	1,000 (RV)	± 3.1%	43%	46%	–	11%
Emerson College	Feb 14–16, 2019	1,000 (RV)	± 3.0%	49%	51%	–	–
Public Policy Polling	Jan 19–21, 2019	760 (RV)	± 3.6%	42%	47%	–	11%
Morning Consult/Politico	Aug 16–18, 2018	1,974 (RV)	± 2.0%	29%	27%	–	44%
Public Policy Polling	Jun 8–10, 2018	679 (RV)	± 3.8%	39%	47%	–	15%
Zogby Analytics	May 10–12, 2018	881 (LV)	± 3.2%	38%	38%	–	24%
Public Policy Polling	Mar 23–25, 2018	846 (RV)	± 3.4%	39%	49%	–	12%
Public Policy Polling	Feb 9–11, 2018	687 (RV)	± 3.7%	42%	46%	–	11%
Public Policy Polling	Dec 11–12, 2017	862 (RV)	± 3.3%	40%	50%	–	10%
Public Policy Polling	Oct 27–29, 2017	572 (RV)	± 4.1%	38%	49%	–	13%
Public Policy Polling	Sep 22–25, 2017	865 (RV)	± 3.3%	40%	47%	–	13%
Public Policy Polling	Aug 18–21, 2017	887 (RV)	± 3.3%	39%	42%	–	19%
Public Policy Polling	Jul 14–17, 2017	836 (RV)	± 3.4%	40%	45%	–	15%
Public Policy Polling	Jun 9–11, 2017	811 (RV)	± 3.4%	41%	43%	–	17%
Public Policy Polling	May 12–14, 2017	692 (RV)	± 3.7%	39%	46%	–	15%
Public Policy Polling	Apr 17–18, 2017	648 (RV)	± 3.9%	42%	42%	–	17%
Public Policy Polling	Mar 27–28, 2017	677 (RV)	± 3.8%	42%	45%	–	13%

Marianne Williamson

Poll source	Date(s) administered	Sample size	Margin of error	Donald Trump (R)	Marianne Williamson (D)	Other	Undecided
HarrisX	Aug 23–24, 2019	1,001 (RV)	–	37%	30%	20%	12%
HarrisX	Jul 26–27, 2019	1,001 (RV)	–	37%	26%	23%	14%
HarrisX	Jun 23–24, 2019	1,001 (RV)	± 3.1%	38%	26%	23%	13%
HarrisX	May 26–27, 2019	1,003 (RV)	± 3.1%	37%	27%	17%	13%
HarrisX	Apr 30 – May 1, 2019	1,000 (RV)	± 3.1%	40%	24%	18%	13%
HarrisX	Apr 3–4, 2019	1,002 (RV)	± 3.1%	37%	26%	15%	15%
HarrisX	Mar 19–20, 2019	1,001 (RV)	± 3.1%	36%	27%	13%	16%

Julián Castro

Poll source	Date(s) administered	Sample size	Margin of error	Donald Trump (R)	Julian Castro (D)	Other	Undecided
HarrisX	Oct 1–2, 2019	1,000 (RV)	–	37%	30%	20%	13%
HarrisX	July 25–26, 2019	1,000 (RV)	–	39%	29%	19% (Note: "Other" with 15%; would not vote with 5%)	13%
Rasmussen Reports	Jul 7–18, 2019	5,000 (LV)	± 1.5%	46%	40%	–	14%
HarrisX	Jun 22–23, 2019	1,001 (RV)	± 3.1%	41%	29%	19%	11%
HarrisX	May 25–26, 2019	1,001 (RV)	± 3.1%	39%	26%	15%	13%
HarrisX	Apr 28–29, 2019	1,002 (RV)	± 3.1%	38%	26%	17%	13%
HarrisX	Mar 31 – Apr 1, 2019	1,000 (RV)	± 3.1%	38%	30%	14%	13%
HarrisX	Mar 17–18, 2019	1,001 (RV)	± 3.1%	37%	30%	12%	15%

Kamala Harris

Poll source	Date(s) administered	Sample size	Margin of error	Donald Trump (R)	Kamala Harris (D)	Other	Undecided
SurveyUSA	Nov 20–21, 2019	3,850 (RV)	± 1.7%	42%	47%	–	11%
RealClear Opinion Research	Nov 15–21, 2019	2,055 (RV)	± 2.38%	40%	46%	–	14%
ABC News/Washington Post	Oct 27–30, 2019	876 (RV)	± 4%	42%	51%	5% (Note: "Other" with 0%; "neither" with 2%; would not vote with 3%)	2%
Morning Consult/Politico	Oct 25–28, 2019	1,997 (RV)	± 2%	36%	31%	–	33%
SurveyUSA	Oct 15–16, 2019	3,080 (RV)	± 2.1%	44%	47%	–	9%
Lord Ashcroft Polls	Oct 1–15, 2019	15,051 (A)	–	44%	56%	–	–
Zogby Analytics	Oct 1–3, 2019	887 (LV)	± 3.3%	47%	41%	–	12%
IBD/TIPP	Sep 26 – Oct 3, 2019	863 (RV)	± 3.5%	46%	46%	2%	5%
HarrisX	Oct 1–2, 2019	1000 (RV)	–	38%	35%	16%	11%
Emerson College	Sep 21–23, 2019	1,019 (RV)	± 3.0%	52%	48%	–	–
Fox News	Sep 15–17, 2019	1,008 (RV)	± 3.0%	40%	42%	10%	4%
SurveyUSA	Sep 13–16, 2019	4,520 (RV)	± 1.6%	44%	44%	–	12%
ABC News/Washington Post	Sep 2–5, 2019	877 (RV)	± 4.0%	43%	50%	–	2%
IBD/TIPP	Aug 22–30, 2019	848 (RV)	–	46%	49%	1%	4%
Emerson College	Aug 24–26, 2019	1,458 (RV)	± 2.5%	50%	50%	–	–
Quinnipiac University	Aug 21–26, 2019	1,422 (RV)	± 3.1%	40%	51%	2%	5%
Morning Consult/Politico	Aug 16–18, 2019	1,998 (RV)	± 2.0%	35%	32%	–	33%
Fox News	Aug 11–13, 2019	1,013 (RV)	± 3.0%	39%	45%	6%	7%
SurveyUSA	Aug 1–5, 2019	5,459 (RV)	± 1.6%	44%	45%	–	11%
IBD/TIPP	Jul 25 – Aug 1, 2019	856 (RV)	–	45%	47%	2%	5%
Emerson College	Jul 27–29, 2019	1,233 (RV)	± 2.7%	52%	48%	–	–
HarrisX	July 25–26, 2019	1,000 (RV)	–	39%	36%	16% (Note: "Other" with 11%; would not vote with 5%)	9%
Fox News	Jul 21–23, 2019	1,004 (RV)	± 3.0%	41%	40%	7%	8%
NBC News/Wall Street Journal	Jul 7–9, 2019	800 (RV)	± 3.5%	44%	45%	4%	6%
Emerson College	Jul 6–8, 2019	1,100 (RV)	± 2.9%	51%	49%	–	–
ABC News/Washington Post	Jun 28 – Jul 1, 2019	875 (RV)	± 4.0%	46%	48%	1%	2%
Emerson College	Jun 21–24, 2019	1,096 (RV)	± 2.9%	48%	52%	–	–
HarrisX	Jun 22–23, 2019	1,001 (RV)	± 3.1%	41%	33%	16%	10%
Fox News	Jun 9–12, 2019	1,001 (RV)	± 3.0%	41%	42%	6%	7%
Ipsos/Daily Beast	Jun 10–11, 2019	1,005 (A)	± 2.5%	35%	41%	–	12%
Quinnipiac University	Jun 6–10, 2019	1,214 (RV)	± 3.5%	41%	49%	1%	6%
Morning Consult/Politico	Jun 7–9, 2019	1,991 (RV)	± 2.0%	33%	30%	–	37%
Ipsos/Reuters	May 29 – Jun 5, 2019	3,851 (RV)	± 1.8%	38%	41%	11%	7%
HarrisX	May 25–26, 2019	1,001 (RV)	± 3.1%	38%	33%	11%	12%
Change Research	May 18–21, 2019	2,904 (LV)	± 1.8%	45%	46%	7%	–
Fox News	May 11–14, 2019	1,008 (RV)	± 3.0%	41%	41%	7%	8%
Emerson College	May 10–13, 2019	1,006 (RV)	± 3.0%	49%	51%	–	–
Zogby Analytics	May 2–9, 2019	903 (LV)	–	41%	44%	–	16%
Rasmussen Reports	Apr 28 – May 9, 2019	5,000 (LV)	± 1.5%	47%	42%	–	12%
HarrisX	Apr 28–29, 2019	1,002 (RV)	± 3.1%	39%	30%	14%	10%
CNN/SSRS	Apr 25–28, 2019	453 (RV)	± 5.5%	45%	49%	0%	3%
Emerson College	Apr 11–14, 2019	914 (RV)	± 3.2%	50%	50%	–	–
Civiqs/Daily Kos	Apr 6–9, 2019	1,584 (RV)	± 2.7%	45%	44%	–	10%
HarrisX	Mar 31 – Apr 1, 2019	1,000 (RV)	± 3.1%	38%	32%	15%	11%
Public Policy Polling	Mar 27–28, 2019	846 (RV)	± 3.4%	41%	48%	–	11%
Fox News	Mar 17–20, 2019	1,002 (RV)	± 3.0%	41%	39%	7%	9%
Emerson College	Mar 17–18, 2019	1,153 (RV)	± 2.8%	48%	52%	–	–
HarrisX	Mar 17–18, 2019	1,001 (RV)	± 3.1%	36%	34%	12%	12%
Civiqs/Daily Kos	Mar 9–12, 2019	1,622 (A)	± 2.6%	44%	44%	–	12%
Change Research	Mar 8–10, 2019	4,049 (LV)	± 2.5%	47%	48%	–	–
D-CYFOR	Feb 22–23, 2019	1,000 (RV)	± 3.1%	43%	45%	–	12%
Emerson College	Feb 14–16, 2019	1,000 (RV)	± 3.0%	48%	52%	–	–
Change Research	Jan 31 – Feb 1, 2019	1,338 (LV)	± 2.7%	46%	47%	–	–
Øptimus	Jan 30 – Feb 1, 2019	1,079 (LV)	± 3.0%	45%	43%	–	12%
Public Policy Polling	Jan 19–21, 2019	760 (RV)	± 3.6%	41%	48%	–	11%
SurveyMonkey/Axios	Oct 28–30, 2018	2,994 (RV)	–	42%	52%	–	6%
Morning Consult/Politico	Aug 16–18, 2018	1,974 (RV)	± 2.0%	29%	26%	–	45%
Public Policy Polling	Jun 8–10, 2018	679 (RV)	± 3.8%	40%	45%	–	15%
Zogby Analytics	May 10–12, 2018	881 (LV)	± 3.2%	39%	35%	–	26%
Public Policy Polling	Mar 23–25, 2018	846 (RV)	± 3.4%	39%	43%	–	18%
Public Policy Polling	Feb 9–11, 2018	687 (RV)	± 3.7%	43%	43%	–	15%
Zogby Analytics	Jan 12–15, 2018	847 (LV)	± 3.4%	41%	42%	–	16%
Public Policy Polling	Dec 11–12, 2017	862 (RV)	± 3.3%	40%	46%	–	13%
Public Policy Polling	Oct 27–29, 2017	572 (RV)	± 4.1%	39%	45%	–	16%
Public Policy Polling	Sep 22–25, 2017	865 (RV)	± 3.3%	40%	41%	–	19%
Public Policy Polling	Aug 18–21, 2017	887 (RV)	± 3.3%	39%	39%	–	22%
Zogby Analytics	Aug 4–7, 2017	1,300 (LV)	–	38%	41%	–	21%
Public Policy Polling	Jul 14–17, 2017	836 (RV)	± 3.4%	40%	41%	–	19%
Public Policy Polling	Jun 9–11, 2017	811 (RV)	± 3.4%	41%	42%	–	18%

Steve Bullock

Poll source	Date(s) administered	Sample size	Margin of error	Donald Trump (R)	Steve Bullock (D)	Other	Undecided
HarrisX	Aug 23–24, 2019	1,001 (RV)	–	37%	31%	19% (Note: "Other" with 13%; would not vote with 6%)	12%
HarrisX	Jul 26–27, 2019	1,001 (RV)	–	36%	28%	22%	15%
HarrisX	Jun 23–24, 2019	1,001 (RV)	± 3.1%	38%	26%	24%	13%
Morning Consult/Politico	Aug 16–18, 2018	1,974 (RV)	± 2.0%	28%	18%	–	54%

Wayne Messam

Poll source	Date(s) administered	Sample size	Margin of error	Donald Trump (R)	Wayne Messam (D)	Other	Undecided
HarrisX	Aug 23–24, 2019	1,001 (RV)	–	37%	33%	22% (Note: "Other" with 15%; would not vote with 6%)	13%
HarrisX	Jul 26–27, 2019	1,001 (RV)	–	37%	24%	24%	15%
HarrisX	Jun 23–24, 2019	1,001 (RV)	± 3.1%	38%	23%	24%	14%
HarrisX	May 25–26, 2019	1,001 (RV)	± 3.1%	40%	20%	19%	15%
HarrisX	Apr 28–29, 2019	1,002 (RV)	± 3.1%	38%	21%	21%	14%

Beto O'Rourke

Poll source	Date(s) administered	Sample size	Margin of error	Donald Trump (R)	Beto O'Rourke (D)	Other	Undecided
HarrisX	Oct 1–2, 2019	1000 (RV)	–	36%	32%	19% (Note: "Other" with 11%; would not vote with 8%)	12%
SurveyUSA	Sep 13–16, 2019	4,520 (RV)	± 1.6%	44%	41%	–	15%
HarrisX	July 25–26, 2019	1,000 (RV)	–	40%	29%	19% (Note: "Other" with 14%; would not vote with 5%)	12%
HarrisX	Jun 22–23, 2019	1,001 (RV)	± 3.1%	40%	33%	16%	11%
Morning Consult/Politico	Jun 7–9, 2019	1,991 (RV)	± 2.0%	32%	28%	–	40%
HarrisX	May 25–26, 2019	1,001 (RV)	± 3.1%	39%	30%	12%	13%
Change Research	May 18–21, 2019	2,904 (LV)	± 1.8%	46%	46%	7%	–
Emerson College	May 10–13, 2019	1,006 (RV)	± 3.0%	48%	52%	–	–
HarrisX	Apr 28–29, 2019	1,002 (RV)	± 3.1%	38%	31%	14%	11%
CNN/SSRS	Apr 25–28, 2019	469 (RV)	± 5.5%	42%	52%	<1%	4%
Emerson College	Apr 11–14, 2019	914 (RV)	± 3.2%	49%	51%	–	–
HarrisX	Mar 31 – Apr 1, 2019	1,000 (RV)	± 3.1%	38%	34%	11%	11%
Public Policy Polling	Mar 27–28, 2019	846 (RV)	± 3.4%	41%	47%	–	12%
Emerson College	Mar 17–18, 2019	1,153 (RV)	± 2.8%	51%	49%	–	–
HarrisX	Mar 17–18, 2019	1,001 (RV)	± 3.1%	36%	36%	9%	13%
Civiqs/Daily Kos	Mar 9–12, 2019	1,622 (A)	± 2.6%	44%	43%	–	13%
Change Research	Mar 8–10, 2019	4,049 (LV)	± 2.5%	47%	48%	–	–
Emerson College	Feb 14–16, 2019	1,000 (RV)	± 3.0%	47%	53%	–	–
Change Research	Jan 31 – Feb 1, 2019	1,338 (LV)	± 2.7%	46%	47%	–	–
Public Policy Polling	Jan 19–21, 2019	760 (RV)	± 3.6%	41%	47%	–	12%
HarrisX	Dec 16–17, 2018	1,001 (RV)	± 3.1%	37%	30%	–	34%

Tim Ryan

Poll source	Date(s) administered	Sample size	Margin of error	Donald Trump (R)	Tim Ryan (D)	Other	Undecided
HarrisX	May 26–27, 2019	1,003 (RV)	± 3.1%	37%	28%	17%	13%
HarrisX	Apr 30 – May 1, 2019	1,000 (RV)	± 3.1%	38%	27%	16%	13%

Bill de Blasio

Poll source	Date(s) administered	Sample size	Margin of error	Donald Trump (R)	Bill de Blasio (D)	Other	Undecided
HarrisX	Aug 23–24, 2019	1,001 (RV)	–	37%	31%	20%	11%
HarrisX	Jul 26–27, 2019	1,001 (RV)	–	38%	26%	23%	13%
HarrisX	Jun 23–24, 2019	1,001 (RV)	± 3.1%	38%	25%	24% (Note: "Other" with 19%; would not vote with 6%)	12%
Rasmussen Reports	May 26 – June 6, 2019	5,000 (LV)	± 1.5%	46%	38%	–	16%

Kirsten Gillibrand

Poll source	Date(s) administered	Sample size	Margin of error	Donald Trump (R)	Kirsten Gillibrand (D)	Other	Undecided
HarrisX	Aug 23–24, 2019	1,001 (RV)	–	38%	34%	17%	12%
HarrisX	Jul 26–27, 2019	1,001 (RV)	–	37%	32%	20%	11%
HarrisX	Jun 23–24, 2019	1,001 (RV)	± 3.1%	38%	30%	20%	12%
HarrisX	May 26–27, 2019	1,003 (RV)	± 3.1%	37%	29%	15%	13%
HarrisX	Apr 30 – May 1, 2019	1,000 (RV)	± 3.1%	39%	28%	16%	11%
HarrisX	Apr 3–4, 2019	1,002 (RV)	± 3.1%	36%	29%	13%	14%
Public Policy Polling	Mar 27–28, 2019	846 (RV)	± 3.4%	41%	47%	–	12%
HarrisX	Mar 19–20, 2019	1,001 (RV)	± 3.1%	36%	31%	10%	14%
Public Policy Polling	Jan 19–21, 2019	760 (RV)	± 3.6%	42%	47%	–	12%
SurveyMonkey/Axios	Oct 28–30, 2018	2,942 (RV)	–	44%	50%	–	7%
Morning Consult/Politico	Aug 16–18, 2018	1,974 (RV)	± 2.0%	29%	24%	–	47%
Public Policy Polling	Jun 8–10, 2018	679 (RV)	± 3.8%	39%	45%	–	16%
Public Policy Polling	Mar 23–25, 2018	846 (RV)	± 3.4%	40%	42%	–	18%
Public Policy Polling	Feb 9–11, 2018	687 (RV)	± 3.7%	43%	42%	–	15%
YouGov	Jan 9, 2018	865 (RV)	–	43%	41%	–	–
Public Policy Polling	Dec 11–12, 2017	862 (RV)	± 3.3%	40%	47%	–	14%
Public Policy Polling	Oct 27–29, 2017	572 (RV)	± 4.1%	38%	48%	–	14%
Public Policy Polling	Sep 22–25, 2017	865 (RV)	± 3.3%	39%	42%	–	18%

Seth Moulton

Poll source	Date(s) administered	Sample size	Margin of error	Donald Trump (R)	Seth Moulton (D)	Other	Undecided
HarrisX	Jul 26–27, 2019	1,001 (RV)	–	37%	25%	23%	15%
HarrisX	Jun 23–24, 2019	1,001 (RV)	± 3.1%	38%	24%	24%	14%
HarrisX	May 25–26, 2019	1,001 (RV)	± 3.1%	38%	21%	18%	15%
HarrisX	Apr 28–29, 2019	1,002 (RV)	± 3.1%	37%	22%	20%	13%

Jay Inslee

Poll source	Date(s) administered	Sample size	Margin of error	Donald Trump (R)	Jay Inslee (D)	Other	Undecided
HarrisX	Jul 26–27, 2019	1,001 (RV)	–	37%	28%	21% (Note: "Other" with 16%; would not vote with 5%)	14%
HarrisX	Jun 23–24, 2019	1,001 (RV)	± 3.1%	39%	24%	24%	13%
HarrisX	May 25–26, 2019	1,001 (RV)	± 3.1%	39%	21%	17%	15%
HarrisX	Apr 28–29, 2019	1,002 (RV)	± 3.1%	37%	24%	19%	13%
HarrisX	Mar 31 – Apr 1, 2019	1,000 (RV)	± 3.1%	38%	25%	16%	15%
HarrisX	Mar 17–18, 2019	1,001 (RV)	± 3.1%	36%	26%	14%	17%

John Hickenlooper

Poll source	Date(s) administered	Sample size	Margin of error	Donald Trump (R)	John Hickenlooper (D)	Other	Undecided
HarrisX	Jul 26–27, 2019	1,001 (RV)	–	37%	27%	22%	14%
HarrisX	Jun 23–24, 2019	1,001 (RV)	± 3.1%	37%	27%	23%	13%
HarrisX	May 26–27, 2019	1,003 (RV)	± 3.1%	37%	26%	16%	16%
HarrisX	Apr 30 – May 1, 2019	1,000 (RV)	± 3.1%	39%	25%	17%	13%
HarrisX	Apr 3–4, 2019	1,002 (RV)	± 3.1%	37%	25%	15%	15%
HarrisX	Mar 19–20, 2019	1,001 (RV)	± 3.1%	35%	28%	13%	16%

Mike Gravel

Poll source	Date(s) administered	Sample size	Margin of error	Donald Trump (R)	Mike Gravel (D)	Other	Undecided
HarrisX	Jul 26–27, 2019	1,001 (RV)	–	37%	25%	25% (Note: "Other" with 18%; would not vote with 7%)	14%
HarrisX	Jun 23–24, 2019	1,001 (RV)	± 3.1%	38%	24%	25% (Note: "Other" with 20%; would not vote with 6%)	13%
HarrisX	May 25–26, 2019	1,001 (RV)	± 3.1%	39%	21%	20%	14%
HarrisX	Apr 28–29, 2019	1,002 (RV)	± 3.1%	38%	22%	20%	13%

Eric Swalwell

Poll source	Date(s) administered	Sample size	Margin of error	Donald Trump (R)	Eric Swalwell (D)	Other	Undecided
HarrisX	Jun 23–24, 2019	1,001 (RV)	± 3.1%	38%	25%	24%	13%
HarrisX	May 26–27, 2019	1,003 (RV)	± 3.1%	37%	25%	18%	14%
HarrisX	Apr 30 – May 1, 2019	1,000 (RV)	± 3.1%	39%	25%	17%	14%

== Hypothetical polling ==
The scenarios contained in the collapsed table below include candidates who have explicitly declined to run, candidates who have not been the subject of speculation regarding a potential candidacy, and generic Democratic and independent opponents. Hypotheticals are also included involving withdrawn candidates.

with Donald Trump and Michael Avenatti

Poll source	Date(s) administered	Sample size	Margin of error	Donald Trump (R)	Michael Avenatti (D)	Undecided
SurveyMonkey/Axios	Oct 24–29, 2018	3,064 (RV)	–	47%	43%	9%
Morning Consult/Politico	Aug 16–18, 2018	1,974 (RV)	± 2.0%	28%	20%	51%

with Donald Trump, Michael Avenatti, and Michael Bloomberg

Poll source	Date(s) administered	Sample size	Margin of error	Donald Trump (R)	Michael Avenatti (D)	Michael Bloomberg (I)	Undecided
SurveyMonkey/Axios	Oct 24–29, 2018	3,064 (RV)	–	45%	14%	33%	7%

with Donald Trump, Joe Biden, and Michael Bloomberg

Poll source	Date(s) administered	Sample size	Margin of error	Donald Trump (R)	Joe Biden (D)	Michael Bloomberg (I)	Undecided
SurveyMonkey/Axios	Oct 24–29, 2018	3,064 (RV)	–	43%	44%	10%	3%

with Donald Trump, Joe Biden, and Howard Schultz

Poll source	Date(s) administered	Sample size	Margin of error	Donald Trump (R)	Joe Biden (D)	Howard Schultz (I)	Undecided
Emerson College	Mar 17–18, 2019	1,153 (RV)	± 2.8%	44%	52%	4%	–
Change Research	Mar 8–10, 2019	4,049 (LV)	± 2.5%	45%	48%	4%	–
Emerson College	Feb 14–16, 2019	1,000 (RV)	± 3.0%	42%	51%	7%	–
Change Research	Jan 31 – Feb 1, 2019	1,338 (LV)	± 2.7%	44%	49%	3%	–
Øptimus	Jan 30 – Feb 1, 2019	1,064 (LV)	± 3.0%	41%	45%	6%	8%

with Donald Trump and Richard Blumenthal

Poll source	Date(s) administered	Sample size	Margin of error	Donald Trump (R)	Richard Blumenthal (D)	Undecided
Public Policy Polling	Aug 18–21, 2017	887 (RV)	± 3.3%	39%	42%	19%

with Donald Trump and Sherrod Brown

Poll source	Date(s) administered	Sample size	Margin of error	Donald Trump (R)	Sherrod Brown (D)	Undecided
Emerson College	Feb 14–16, 2019	1,000 (RV)	± 3.0%	48%	52%	–

with Donald Trump and Stephanie Clifford/Stormy Daniels

Poll source	Date(s) administered	Sample size	Margin of error	Donald Trump (R)	"Stephanie Clifford" (D)	"Stormy Daniels" (D)	Undecided
Public Policy Polling	Mar 23–25, 2018	846 (RV)	± 3.4%	41%	42%	–	17%
Public Policy Polling	Mar 23–25, 2018	846 (RV)	± 3.4%	41%	–	32%	27%

with Donald Trump and Hillary Clinton

Poll source	Date(s) administered	Sample size	Margin of error	Donald Trump (R)	Hillary Clinton (D)	Other	Undecided
Zogby/EMI/Washington Examiner	May 26, 2020	1,001 (LV)	± 3.2%	43%	46%	–	–
IBD/TIPP	Dec 6–14, 2019	905 (RV)	± 3.3%	46%	44%	5%	4%
FOX News	Oct 27–30, 2019	1,040 (RV)	± 3%	49%	43%	6%	2%
Rasmussen Reports	Oct 3–6, 2019	1,000 (LV)	± 3%	45%	45%	–	11%
SurveyMonkey/Axios	Oct 28–30, 2018	2,942 (RV)	–	45%	50%	–	5%
Public Policy Polling	Sep 22–25, 2017	865 (RV)	± 3.3%	42%	47%	–	11%

with Donald Trump and Mark Cuban

Poll source	Date(s) administered	Sample size	Margin of error	Donald Trump (R)	Mark Cuban (D)	Undecided
Emerson College	Oct 12–14, 2017	820 (RV)	± 3.4%	43%	36%	22%
Public Policy Polling	Aug 18–21, 2017	887 (RV)	± 3.3%	38%	42%	20%
Public Policy Polling	Feb 21–22, 2017	941 (RV)	± 3.2%	41%	40%	19%

with Donald Trump and Andrew Cuomo

Poll source	Date(s) administered	Sample size	Margin of error	Donald Trump (R)	Andrew Cuomo (D)	Undecided
Zogby/EMI/Washington Examiner	May 26, 2020	1,001 (LV)	± 3.2%	37%	52%	–
Zogby Analytics	Apr 8–9, 2020	1,332 (LV)	± 2.7%	44%	45%	–
Morning Consult/Politico	Aug 16–18, 2018	1,974 (RV)	± 2.0%	30%	25%	45%

with Donald Trump and Al Franken

Poll source	Date(s) administered	Sample size	Margin of error	Donald Trump (R)	Al Franken (D)	Undecided
Public Policy Polling	May 12–14, 2017	692 (RV)	± 3.7%	38%	46%	16%
Public Policy Polling	Apr 17–18, 2017	648 (RV)	± 3.9%	43%	43%	14%
Public Policy Polling	Mar 27–28, 2017	677 (RV)	± 3.8%	41%	46%	13%

with Donald Trump, Kamala Harris, and Howard Schultz

Poll source	Date(s) administered	Sample size	Margin of error	Donald Trump (R)	Kamala Harris (D)	Howard Schultz (I)	Undecided
Change Research	Mar 8–10, 2019	4,049 (RV)	± 2.5%	45%	44%	7%	–
Emerson College	Feb 14–16, 2019	1,000 (RV)	± 3.0%	45%	43%	12%	–
Howard Schultz (Note: An internal poll released by Schultz prior to him ruling out a 2020 presidential bid)	– (Note: Not yet released, but poll published on Feb 3, 2019)	1,500 (RV)	± 2.5%	33%	32%	17%	–
Change Research	Jan 31 – Feb 1, 2019	1,338 (LV)	± 2.7%	45%	43%	7%	–
Øptimus	Jan 30 – Feb 1, 2019	1,034 (LV)	± 3.0%	42%	38%	7%	13%

with Donald Trump and Eric Holder

Poll source	Date(s) administered	Sample size	Margin of error	Donald Trump (R)	Eric Holder (D)	Undecided
Morning Consult/Politico	Aug 16–18, 2018	1,974 (RV)	± 2.0%	30%	24%	46%
Morning Consult/Politico	Jun 14–18, 2018	1,994 (RV)	± 2.0%	37%	21%	41%

with Donald Trump and Dwayne Johnson

Poll source	Date(s) administered	Sample size	Margin of error	Donald Trump (R)	Dwayne Johnson (D)	Undecided
Public Policy Polling	May 12–14, 2017	692 (RV)	± 3.7%	37%	42%	21%

with Donald Trump and Joe Kennedy III

Poll source	Date(s) administered	Sample size	Margin of error	Donald Trump (R)	Joe Kennedy III (D)	Undecided
Public Policy Polling	Feb 9–11, 2018	687 (RV)	± 3.7%	43%	46%	12%

with Donald Trump and Barack Obama (Note: Barack Obama is ineligible to run for president due to the Twenty-second Amendment to the United States Constitution)

Poll source	Date(s) administered	Sample size	Margin of error	Donald Trump (R)	Barack Obama (D)	Undecided
Public Policy Polling (D)/Politico	May 18–19, 2020	1,223 (RV)	–	43%	54%	3%

with Donald Trump and Michelle Obama

Poll source	Date(s) administered	Sample size	Margin of error	Donald Trump (R)	Michelle Obama (D)	Undecided
Rasmussen Reports	Dec 16–17, 2019	1,000 (LV)	± 3%	45%	48%	7%
Rasmussen Reports	Nov 12–13, 2018	1,000 (LV)	± 3.0%	43%	50%	7%
SurveyMonkey/Axios	Oct 28–30, 2018	2,942 (RV)	–	42%	55%	3%
Zogby Analytics	May 10–12, 2018	881 (LV)	± 3.2%	39%	48%	13%
Zogby Analytics	Jan 12–15, 2018	847 (LV)	± 3.4%	42%	49%	9%
Zogby Analytics	Oct 19–25, 2017	1,514 (LV)	± 2.5%	44%	47%	9%
Public Policy Polling	Sep 22–25, 2017	865 (RV)	± 3.3%	41%	51%	9%

with Donald Trump and Alexandria Ocasio-Cortez (Note: Ocasio-Cortez is ineligible to run for president until the 2024 Presidential election due to not meeting the minimum age requirement set out in Article II, Section 1, Clause 5 of the Constitution of the United States)

Poll source	Date(s) administered	Sample size	Margin of error	Donald Trump (R)	Alexandria Ocasio-Cortez (D)	Undecided
Rasmussen Reports	Jan 10–13, 2019	1,000 (RV)	± 3.0%	43%	40%	17%

with Donald Trump, Beto O'Rourke, and Howard Schultz

Poll source	Date(s) administered	Sample size	Margin of error	Donald Trump (R)	Beto O'Rourke (D)	Howard Schultz (I)	Undecided
Emerson College	Mar 17–18, 2019	1,153 (RV)	± 2.8%	46%	44%	10%	–
Change Research	Mar 8–10, 2019	4,049 (LV)	± 2.5%	45%	44%	7%	–
Change Research	Jan 31 – Feb 1, 2019	1,338 (LV)	± 2.7%	45%	42%	7%	–
Øptimus	Jan 30 – Feb 1, 2019	1,044 (LV)	± 3.0%	42%	33%	9%	16%

with Donald Trump and Nancy Pelosi

Poll source	Date(s) administered	Sample size	Margin of error	Donald Trump (R)	Nancy Pelosi (D)	Undecided
Public Policy Polling	Jan 19–21, 2019	760 (RV)	± 3.6%	44%	47%	9%

with Donald Trump and Megan Rapinoe

Poll source	Date(s) administered	Sample size	Margin of error	Donald Trump (R)	Megan Rapinoe (D)	Undecided
Public Policy Polling	Jul 3–8, 2019	604 (RV)	–	41%	42%	17%

with Donald Trump, Bernie Sanders, and Howard Schultz

Poll source	Date(s) administered	Sample size	Margin of error	Donald Trump (R)	Bernie Sanders (D)	Howard Schultz (I)	Undecided
Change Research	Mar 8–10, 2019	4,049 (LV)	± 2.5%	45%	46%	7%	–
Change Research	Jan 31 – Feb 1, 2019	1,338 (LV)	± 2.7%	45%	43%	7%	–

with Donald Trump and Chuck Schumer

Poll source	Date(s) administered	Sample size	Margin of error	Donald Trump (R)	Chuck Schumer (D)	Undecided
Public Policy Polling	Jan 19–21, 2019	760 (RV)	± 3.6%	41%	46%	12%

with Donald Trump, Elizabeth Warren, and Michael Bloomberg

Poll source	Date(s) administered	Sample size	Margin of error	Donald Trump (R)	Elizabeth Warren (D)	Michael Bloomberg (I)	Undecided
SurveyMonkey/Axios	Oct 24–29, 2018	3,064 (RV)	–	45%	34%	17%	4%

with Donald Trump, Elizabeth Warren, and Howard Schultz

Poll source	Date(s) administered	Sample size	Margin of error	Donald Trump (R)	Elizabeth Warren (D)	Howard Schultz (I)	Undecided
Change Research	Mar 8–10, 2019	4,049 (LV)	± 2.5%	45%	45%	7%	–
Howard Schultz	–	1,500 (RV)	± 2.5%	33%	32%	17%	–
Change Research	Jan 31 – Feb 1, 2019	1,338 (LV)	± 2.7%	45%	43%	6%	–
Øptimus	Jan 30 – Feb 1, 2019	1,052 (LV)	± 3.0%	42%	39%	8%	11%

with Donald Trump and Frederica Wilson

Poll source	Date(s) administered	Sample size	Margin of error	Donald Trump (R)	Frederica Wilson (D)	Undecided
Public Policy Polling	Oct 27–29, 2017	572 (RV)	± 4.1%	39%	42%	19%

with Donald Trump and Oprah Winfrey

Poll source	Date(s) administered	Sample size	Margin of error	Donald Trump (R)	Oprah Winfrey (D)	Other	Undecided
SurveyMonkey/Axios	Oct 28–30, 2018	2,994 (RV)	–	41%	53%	–	5%
Zogby Analytics	May 10–12, 2018	881 (LV)	± 3.2%	47%	53%	–	–
CNN/SSRS	Jan 14–18, 2018	913 (RV)	± 3.8%	42%	51%	2%	1%
Quinnipiac University	Jan 12–16, 2018	1,212 (V)	± 3.4%	39%	52%	2%	4%
Morning Consult/Politico	Jan 11–16, 2018	1,993 (RV)	± 2.0%	38%	40%	–	22%
Zogby Analytics	Jan 12–15, 2018	847 (LV)	± 3.4%	46%	54%	–	–
Public Policy Polling (D)	Jan 9–10, 2018	620 (RV)	± 3.9%	43%	44%	–	13%
Marist College	Jan 8–10, 2018	1,092 (RV)	± 3.0%	39%	50%	–	11%
YouGov	Jan 9, 2018	865 (RV)	–	43%	47%	–	–
Rasmussen Reports	Jan 8–9, 2018	1,000 (LV)	± 3.0%	38%	48%	–	14%
Zogby Analytics	Mar 27–29, 2017	1,531 (V)	± 2.5%	36%	46%	–	18%

with Donald Trump and Mark Zuckerberg

Poll source	Date(s) administered	Sample size	Margin of error	Donald Trump (R)	Mark Zuckerberg (D)	Undecided
Zogby Analytics	Jan 12–15, 2018	847 (LV)	± 3.4%	40%	41%	19%
Zogby Analytics	Aug 4–7, 2017	1,300 (LV)	–	40%	43%	16%
Public Policy Polling	Jul 14–17, 2017	836 (RV)	± 3.4%	40%	40%	20%

with Donald Trump, Mark Zuckerberg, and Joe Scarborough

Poll source	Date(s) administered	Sample size	Margin of error	Donald Trump (R)	Mark Zuckerberg (D)	Joe Scarborough (I)	Undecided
Zogby Analytics	Aug 4–7, 2017	1,300 (LV)	–	36%	34%	18%	12%

with Mike Pence and Joe Biden

Poll source	Date(s) administered	Sample size	Margin of error	Mike Pence (R)	Joe Biden (D)	Other	Undecided
YouGov/UMass Lowell	Oct 5–12, 2020	819 (LV)	± 4.3%	41%	54%	1% (Note: "Another candidate" with 1%)	4%
YouGov/Yahoo News	Oct 2–3, 2020	1,088 (LV)	–	42%	49%	2% (Note: Would not vote with 2%)	7%
Léger	Aug 4–7, 2020	1,007 (LV)	–	29%	46%	11% (Note: West (B) with 5%; Jorgensen (L) with 4%; Hawkins (G) with 2%)	14%
Change Research	Mar 26–28, 2020	1,845 (LV)	± 3.3%	37% (Note: Percentages listed as a combination of decided voters + leaners * proportion of voters who are undecided)	43%	10% (Note: Would not vote with 10%)	–
SurveyUSA	Nov 20–21, 2019	3,850 (RV)	± 1.7%	36%	53%	–	12%
Civiqs/Daily Kos	Oct 19–22, 2019	1,333 (RV)	± 2.9%	43%	46%	8% (Note: "Someone else" with 8%)	2%
SurveyUSA	Oct 15–16, 2019	3,080 (RV)	± 2.1%	39%	51%	–	10%
Change Research	Mar 8–10, 2019	4,049 (LV)	± 2.5%	45%	51%	–	–

with Mike Pence and Kamala Harris

Poll source	Date(s) administered	Sample size	Margin of error	Mike Pence (R)	Kamala Harris (D)	Other	Undecided
YouGov/UMass Lowell	Oct 5–12, 2020	819 (LV)	± 4.3%	43%	50%	1%	6%
YouGov/Yahoo News	Oct 2–3, 2020	1,088 (LV)	–	45%	48%	1%	6%
St. Leo University	Sep 27 – Oct 2	947 (LV)	± 3%	42%	48%	–	10%
SurveyUSA	Nov 20–21, 2019	3,850 (RV)	± 1.7%	41%	46%	–	11%
SurveyUSA	Oct 15–16, 2019	3,080 (RV)	± 2.1%	43%	44%	–	13%
Change Research	Mar 8–10, 2019	4,049 (LV)	± 2.5%	47%	48%	–	–

with Mike Pence and Pete Buttigieg

Poll source	Date(s) administered	Sample size	Margin of error	Mike Pence (R)	Pete Buttigieg (D)	Other	Undecided
SurveyUSA	Nov 20–21, 2019	3,850 (RV)	± 1.7%	40%	45%	–	16%
Civiqs/Daily Kos	Oct 19–22, 2019	1,333 (RV)	± 2.9%	43%	43%	10% (Note: "Someone else" with 10%)	4%
SurveyUSA	Oct 15–16, 2019	3,080 (RV)	± 2.1%	43%	40%	–	17%

with Mike Pence and Beto O'Rourke

Poll source	Date(s) administered	Sample size	Margin of error	Mike Pence (R)	Beto O'Rourke (D)	Undecided
Change Research	Mar 8–10, 2019	4,049 (LV)	± 2.5%	47%	48%	–

with Mike Pence and Bernie Sanders

Poll source	Date(s) administered	Sample size	Margin of error	Mike Pence (R)	Bernie Sanders (D)	Other	Undecided
SurveyUSA	Nov 20–21, 2019	3,850 (RV)	± 1.7%	38%	52%	–	10%
Civiqs/Daily Kos	Oct 19–22, 2019	1,333 (RV)	± 2.9%	43%	46%	8%	3%
SurveyUSA	Oct 15–16, 2019	3,080 (RV)	± 2.1%	39%	50%	–	11%
Change Research	Mar 8–10, 2019	4,049 (LV)	± 2.5%	47%	50%	–	–

with Mike Pence and Elizabeth Warren

Poll source	Date(s) administered	Sample size	Margin of error	Mike Pence (R)	Elizabeth Warren (D)	Other	Undecided
SurveyUSA	Nov 20–21, 2019	3,850 (RV)	± 1.7%	41%	48%	–	12%
Civiqs/Daily Kos	Oct 19–22, 2019	1,333 (RV)	± 2.9%	42%	46%	9% (Note: "Someone else" with 9%)	2%
SurveyUSA	Oct 15–16, 2019	3,080 (RV)	± 2.1%	42%	46%	–	12%
Change Research	Mar 8–10, 2019	4,049 (LV)	± 2.5%	47%	49%	–	–

with Mike Pence and Michael Bloomberg

Poll source	Date(s) administered	Sample size	Margin of error	Mike Pence (R)	Michael Bloomberg (D)	Other	Undecided
SurveyUSA	Nov 20–21, 2019	3,850 (RV)	± 1.7%	39%	44%	–	17%

with Donald Trump, generic Democrat, and Howard Schultz

Poll source	Date(s) administered	Sample size	Margin of error	Donald Trump (R)	Generic Democrat	Howard Schultz (I)	Undecided
Change Research	Mar 8–10, 2019	4,049 (LV)	± 2.5%	45%	47%	6%	–

with Mike Pence and generic Democrat

Poll source	Date(s) administered	Sample size	Margin of error	Mike Pence (R)	Generic Democrat	Undecided
Change Research	Mar 8–10, 2019	4,049 (LV)	± 2.5%	46%	51%	–
Opinion Savvy	Aug 16–17, 2017	763 (RV)	± 3.5%	40%	52%	8%

with Mitt Romney and generic Democrat

Poll source	Date(s) administered	Sample size	Margin of error	Mitt Romney (R)	Generic Democrat	Undecided
HarrisX	Jan 4–5, 2019	1,001 (V)	–	27%	39%	33%

with Nikki Haley and Joe Biden

Poll source	Date(s) administered	Sample size	Margin of error	Nikki Haley (R)	Joe Biden (D)	Undecided
SurveyUSA	Oct 15–16, 2019	3,080 (RV)	± 2.1%	28%	51%	21%
SurveyUSA	Sep 13–16, 2019	4,520 (RV)	± 1.6%	23%	51%	26%

with Nikki Haley and Elizabeth Warren

Poll source	Date(s) administered	Sample size	Margin of error	Nikki Haley (R)	Elizabeth Warren (D)	Undecided
SurveyUSA	Oct 15–16, 2019	3,080 (RV)	± 2.1%	31%	44%	25%
SurveyUSA	Sep 13–16, 2019	4,520 (RV)	± 1.6%	28%	42%	30%

with Nikki Haley and Bernie Sanders

Poll source	Date(s) administered	Sample size	Margin of error	Nikki Haley (R)	Bernie Sanders (D)	Undecided
SurveyUSA	Oct 15–16, 2019	3,080 (RV)	± 2.1%	32%	49%	19%
SurveyUSA	Sep 13–16, 2019	4,520 (RV)	± 1.6%	29%	48%	22%

with Nikki Haley and Kamala Harris

Poll source	Date(s) administered	Sample size	Margin of error	Nikki Haley (R)	Kamala Harris (D)	Undecided
SurveyUSA	Oct 15–16, 2019	3,080 (RV)	± 2.1%	31%	40%	29%
SurveyUSA	Sep 13–16, 2019	4,520 (RV)	± 1.6%	27%	40%	33%

with Nikki Haley and Pete Buttigieg

Poll source	Date(s) administered	Sample size	Margin of error	Nikki Haley (R)	Pete Buttigieg (D)	Undecided
SurveyUSA	Oct 15–16, 2019	3,080 (RV)	± 2.1%	33%	36%	31%

with Nikki Haley and Beto O'Rourke

Poll source	Date(s) administered	Sample size	Margin of error	Nikki Haley (R)	Beto O'Rourke (D)	Undecided
SurveyUSA	Sep 13–16, 2019	4,520 (RV)	± 1.6%	30%	37%	34%

with generic Republican and generic Democrat

Poll source	Date(s) administered	Sample size	Margin of error	Generic Republican	Generic Democrat	Other	Undecided
Emerson College	Dec 6–9, 2018	800 (RV)	± 3.6%	43%	45%	11%	–

with Donald Trump and generic Democrat

Poll source	Date(s) administered	Sample size	Margin of error	Donald Trump (R)	Generic Democrat (D)	Other	Undecided
Harvard-Harris	Jun 17–18, 2020	~ 1,735 (LV) (Note: 92% of a sample of 1,886 registered voters)	–	46%	42%	8% (Note: "Independent or other candidate" with 8%)	6% (Note: Includes "other")
Harvard-Harris	May 13–14, 2020	1,708 (LV)	–	43%	47%	6% (Note: "Independent or other candidate" with 6%)	5%
Harvard-Harris	Apr 14–16, 2020	2,394 (RV)	–	40%	44%	7% (Note: "Independent or other candidate" with 7%)	9%
YouGov/Economist	Apr 5–7, 2020	1,147 (RV)	± 3.3%	42%	47%	2%	9%
YouGov/Economist	Mar 29–31, 2020	1,194 (RV)	± 3.2%	42%	45%	2%	11%
Harvard-Harris	Mar 24–26, 2020	2,410 (RV)	–	40%	45%	6%	9%
YouGov/Economist	Mar 15–17, 2020	1,129 (RV)	± 3.5%	40%	48%	1%	11%
YouGov/Economist	Mar 8–10, 2020	1,191 (RV)	± 2.9%	42%	48%	2%	8%
YouGov/Economist	Mar 1–3, 2020	1,134 (RV)	± 3.3%	40%	48%	2%	10%
Harvard-Harris	Feb 26–28, 2020	2,592 (RV)	–	40%	45%	6%	9%
YouGov/Economist	Feb 23–25, 2020	1,184 (RV)	± 3%	40%	47%	2%	11%
YouGov/Economist	Feb 16–18, 2020	1,150 (RV)	± 3%	41%	47%	3% (Note: Would not vote with 3%)	9%
YouGov/Economist	Feb 9–11, 2020	1,140 (RV)	± 3%	41%	47%	2%	10%
YouGov/Economist	Feb 2–4, 2020	1,277 (RV)	± 2.9%	39%	48%	2%	11%
Harvard-Harris	Jan 27–29, 2020	2,527 (RV)	–	39%	46%	7%	8%
YouGov/Economist	Jan 26–28, 2020	1,182 (RV)	± 3%	41%	47%	3%	8%
YouGov/Economist	Jan 19–21, 2020	1,176 (RV)	± 3.1%	44%	45%	2%	9%
Pew Research Center	Jan 6–19, 2020	10,491 (RV)	–	38%	48%	0% (Note: No answer with 0%)	14%
YouGov/Economist	Jan 11–14, 2020	1,108 (RV)	± 3.1%	42%	47%	2%	9%
YouGov/Economist	Jan 5–7, 2020	1,185 (RV)	± 3%	41%	49%	3%	7%
Harvard-Harris	Dec, 2019	– (RV)	–	39%	43%	8%	10%
YouGov/Economist	Dec 28–31, 2019	1,123 (RV)	± 3.1%	40%	50%	2%	8%
YouGov/Economist	Dec 22–24, 2019	1,240 (RV)	± 2.9%	42%	47%	3%	8%
YouGov/Economist	Dec 14–17, 2019	1,164 (RV)	± 3%	40%	49%	2%	10%
YouGov/Economist	Dec 7–10, 2019	1,209 (RV)	± 2.9%	41%	47%	2%	9%
YouGov/Economist	Dec 1–3, 2019	1,200 (RV)	± 2.9%	42%	48%	2%	9%
Harvard-Harris	Nov 27–29, 2019	1,859 (RV)	–	39%	42%	8%	10% (Note: Includes 'other', but not 'will vote for independent and/or other candidate')
YouGov/Economist	Nov 24–26, 2019	1,189 (RV)	± 3%	41%	49%	3%	7%
YouGov/Economist	Nov 17–19, 2019	1,224 (RV)	± 2.9%	40%	49%	2%	9%
YouGov/Economist	Nov 10–12, 2019	1,206 (RV)	± 3%	41%	49%	2%	8%
YouGov/Economist	Nov 3–5, 2019	1,201 (RV)	± 3%	41%	47%	2%	10%
Harvard-Harris	Oct 29–31, 2019	1,810 (RV)	–	38%	43%	9%	10%
NBC News/Wall Street Journal	Oct 27–30, 2019	720 (RV)	± 3.65%	34%	46%	–	20%
YouGov/Economist	Oct 27–29, 2019	1,274 (RV)	± 2.8%	41%	48%	3%	8%
YouGov/Economist	Oct 20–22, 2019	1,204 (RV)	± 2.9%	40%	49%	2%	10%
YouGov/Economist	Oct 13–15, 2019	1,136 (RV)	± 3%	40%	49%	2%	9%
YouGov/Taubman National Poll	Oct 10–11, 2019	1,000 (A)	± 3%	32%	47%	5% (Note: Would not vote with 5%)	15%
Georgetown University	Oct 6–10, 2019	1,000 (LV)	± 3.1%	42%	50%	–	8%
YouGov/Economist	Oct 6–8, 2019	1,241 (RV)	± 2.9%	42%	47%	2%	9%
YouGov/Economist	Sep 28 – Oct 1, 2019	1,081 (RV)	± 3.1%	39%	49%	–	–
Harvard-Harris	Sep 22–24, 2019	2,009 (RV)	–	38%	44%	9%	9%
YouGov/Economist	Sep 22–24, 2019	1,192 (RV)	± 2.9%	39%	49%	–	–
YouGov/Economist	Sep 14–17, 2019	1,179 (RV)	± 2.9%	40%	48%	–	–
Pew Research Center	Sep 3–15, 2020	10,491 (RV)	–	38%	48%	0%	14%
YouGov/Economist	Sep 1–3, 2019	1,066 (RV)	± 3.1%	41%	46%	–	–
Harvard-Harris	Aug 26–28, 2019	2,531 (RV)	–	39%	42%	9%	10%
YouGov/Economist	Aug 24–27, 2019	1,093 (RV)	± 3.1%	40%	48%	–	–
Suffolk University/USA Today	Aug 20–25, 2019	1,000 (RV)	± 3%	39%	41%	10% (Note: "Third-party candidate" with 10%)	10%
NBC News/WSJ	Aug 10–14, 2019	834 (RV)	± 3.4%	40%	52%	2%	3%
YouGov/Economist	Aug 10–13, 2019	1,126 (RV)	± 3.1%	39%	50%	–	–
Cygnal	Aug 7–10, 2019	1,263 (LV)	± 2.8%	41%	46%	7%	6%
YouGov/Economist	Aug 3–6, 2019	1,158 (RV)	± 2.6%	39%	48%	–	–
Harvard-Harris	Jul 31 – Aug 2, 2019	2,214 (RV)	–	35%	45%	8%	11%
YouGov/Economist	Jul 27–30, 2019	1,098 (RV)	± 2.6%	38%	50%	–	–
YouGov/Economist	Jun 30 – Jul 2, 2019	1,265 (RV)	± 2.8%	39%	49%	–	10%
Harvard-Harris	Jun 26–29, 2019	2,182 (RV)	–	36%	45%	8%	11%
YouGov/Economist	Jun 22–25, 2019	1,111 (RV)	± 3.0%	40%	46%	–	12%
YouGov/Economist	Jun 16–18, 2019	1,202 (RV)	± 2.9%	41%	49%	–	8%
YouGov/Economist	Jun 9–11, 2019	1,107 (RV)	± 3.0%	41%	46%	–	10%
YouGov/Economist	Jun 2–4, 2019	1,195 (RV)	± 3.0%	41%	46%	–	11%
Harvard-Harris	May 29–30, 2019	1,295 (RV)	–	37%	42%	9%	12%
YouGov/Economist	May 26–28, 2019	1,120 (RV)	± 3.0%	39%	49%	–	10%
Cygnal	May 22–23, 2019	1,019 (LV)	± 3.1%	37%	42%	15%	6%
YouGov/Economist	May 18–21, 2019	1,113 (RV)	± 3.1%	38%	48%	–	12%
YouGov/Economist	May 12–14, 2019	1,244 (RV)	± 2.8%	39%	50%	–	9%
YouGov/Economist	May 5–7, 2019	1,168 (RV)	± 2.9%	38%	47%	–	12%
Harvard-Harris	Apr 30 – May 1, 2019	1,536 (RV)	–	37%	44%	9%	10%
YouGov/Economist	Apr 27–30, 2019	1,073 (RV)	± 3.1%	38%	49%	–	11%
Hart Research	Apr 23–27, 2019	1,205 (LV)	–	39%	48%	–	13%
ABC/Washington Post	Apr 22–25, 2019	1,001 (A)	± 3.5%	28%	16% (Note: Percentage listed as a % of respondents who said they'd definitely vote for the Democratic nominee as a proportion of respondents who said they would definitely not vote for Trump)	2% (Note: "Definitely not Trump and definitely not the Democratic candidate" with 2%)	54% (Note: "Definitely not voting for Trump, but waiting to see the Democratic nominee before deciding whether to vote for them" with 36%; "Would consider voting for Trump" with 14%; "No opinion" with 3%; "No opinion besides definitely not voting for Trump" with 1%)
YouGov/Economist	Apr 21–23, 2019	1,268 (RV)	± 2.8%	39%	47%	–	12%
YouGov/Economist	Apr 13–16, 2019	1,186 (RV)	± 2.9%	38%	47%	–	11%
YouGov/Economist	Apr 6–9, 2019	1,267 (RV)	± 2.9%	40%	47%	–	11%
YouGov/Economist	Mar 31 – Apr 2, 2019	1,227 (RV)	± 2.9%	37%	48%	–	12%
Harvard-Harris	Mar 25–26, 2019	1,437 (RV)	–	37%	43%	10%	10%
YouGov/Economist	Mar 24–26, 2019	1,249 (RV)	± 2.8%	41%	47%	–	9%
HarrisX/The Hill	Mar 23–24, 2019	1,000 (RV)	± 3.1%	36%	45%	12%	–
YouGov/Economist	Mar 17–19, 2019	1,287 (RV)	± 2.8%	38%	47%	–	12%
Public Policy Polling (D) (Note: Poll sponsored by Protect Our Care)	Mar 13–14, 2019	661 (RV)	± 3.8%	41%	52%	–	7%
YouGov/Economist	Mar 10–12, 2019	1,279 (RV)	± 2.8%	40%	49%	–	9%
Change Research	Mar 8–10, 2019	4,049 (LV)	± 2.5%	46%	51%	–	–
YouGov/Economist	Mar 3–5, 2019	1,304 (RV)	± 2.8%	41%	48%	2%	7%
GBAO	Feb 25 – Mar 3, 2019	2,000 (RV)	–	33%	47%	5%	16%
NBC News/WSJ	Feb 24–27, 2019	720 (RV)	± 3.7%	41%	48%	2%	3%
Harvard-Harris	Feb 19–20, 2019	1,792 (RV)	–	36%	45%	9%	9%
Christopher Newport University	Feb 3–17, 2019	1,001 (LV)	± 3.2%	37%	48%	5%	9%
GQR Research	Jan 12–17, 2019	1,000 (RV)	± 3.2%	41%	51%	5%	3%
Harvard-Harris	Jan 15–16, 2019	1,540 (RV)	–	36%	43%	10%	11%
HarrisX	Jan 4–5, 2019	1,001 (V)	–	39%	45%	–	16%
Harvard-Harris	Dec 24–25, 2018	1,473 (RV)	–	33%	44%	11%	13%
NBC News/WSJ	Dec 9–12, 2018	725 (RV)	± 3.6%	38%	52%	2%	3%
Garin-Hart-Yang/Global Strategy Group (D) (Note: Poll sponsored by Priorities USA Action)	Nov 9–11, 2018	1,016 (V)	–	40%	49%	–	11%
Global Strategy Group/GBA Strategies	Aug 2–5, 2018	1,128 (RV)	–	30%	44%	–	24%
Morning Consult	Jul 26–30, 2018	1,993 (RV)	± 2.0%	35%	48%	–	17%
Morning Consult	Jun 14–18, 2018	1,994 (RV)	± 2.0%	36%	44%	–	20%
Morning Consult/Politico	May 17–19, 2018	1,990 (RV)	± 2.0%	36%	44%	–	20%
Morning Consult/Politico	Mar 1–5, 2018	1,993 (RV)	± 2.0%	36%	44%	–	19%
Rasmussen Reports	Feb 27–28, 2018	1,000 (LV)	± 3.0%	44%	47%	–	9%
NBC News/WSJ	Dec 13–15, 2017	736 (RV)	± 3.6%	36%	52%	–	5%
Morning Consult/Politico	Nov 16–19, 2017	2,586 (RV)	± 2.0%	35%	44%	–	21%
Morning Consult/Politico	Nov 9–11, 2017	1,993 (RV)	± 2.0%	34%	48%	–	18%
Morning Consult/Politico	Oct 26–30, 2017	1,990 (RV)	± 2.0%	36%	46%	–	18%
Opinion Savvy	Aug 16–17, 2017	763 (RV)	± 3.5%	41%	52%	–	8%
Gravis Marketing	Jul 21–31, 2017	1,917 (V)	± 2.2%	39%	48%	–	13%
Morning Consult/Politico	Feb 9–10, 2017	1,791 (RV)	± 2.0%	35%	43%	–	23%

with generic Democrat and generic Independent

Poll source	Date(s) administered	Sample size	Margin of error	Donald Trump (R)	Generic Democrat	Generic Independent	Other	Undecided
Christopher Newport University	Feb 3–17, 2019	1,001 (LV)	± 3.2%	34%	32%	16%	1%	16%

with generic Democrat and generic third party

Poll source	Date(s) administered	Sample size	Margin of error	Donald Trump (R)	Generic Democrat	Generic third party	Other	Undecided
Change Research/Crooked Media	Oct 31 – Nov 3, 2019	971 (V)	–	45%	49%	2%	–	4%
Suffolk University/USA Today	Aug 20–25, 2019	1,000 (RV)	± 3.0%	39%	41%	10%	–	10%
Suffolk University/USA Today	Jun 11–15, 2019	1,000 (RV)	± 3.0%	40%	37%	9%	–	14%
Change Research	Apr 18–19, 2019	717 (LV)	± 3.7%	44%	48%	6%	2%	–
Suffolk University/USA Today	Mar 13–17, 2019	1,000 (RV)	± 3.0%	39%	36%	11%	–	14%

with Donald Trump and generic Centrist Democrat

Poll source	Date(s) administered	Sample size	Margin of error	Donald Trump (R)	Generic Centrist Democrat (D)	Generic Third Party Candidate
HarrisX	Jan 29–30, 2019	1,003 (RV)	± 3.1%	32%	39%	29%

with Donald Trump and generic Progressive Democrat

Poll source	Date(s) administered	Sample size	Margin of error	Donald Trump (R)	Generic Progressive Democrat (D)	Generic Third Party Candidate
HarrisX	Jan 29–30, 2019	1,003 (RV)	± 3.1%	33%	40%	27%

with Donald Trump and generic Opponent

Poll source	Date(s) administered	Sample size	Margin of error	Donald Trump (R)	Generic Opponent	Other	Undecided
Monmouth	Feb 6–9, 2020	827 (RV)	± 3.4%	42%	55% (Note: Listed as "Someone else should be in office" looking ahead to the 2020 presidential election, as opposed to "Trump should be re-elected")	–	3%
Marist College	Jul 15–17, 2019	1,175 (RV)	± 3.7%	39%	53%	–	8%
Morning Consult/Politico	Apr 5–7, 2019	1,992 (RV)	± 2%	36%	55% (Note: "Would probably or definitely vote for someone other than Trump" with 55%)	2%	6%
Marist College	Mar 25–27, 2019	834 (RV)	± 4.1%	35%	54%	–	11%
Quinnipiac	Mar 21–25, 2019	1,358 (RV)	± 5.1%	30%	53% (Note: "Will definitely not vote for Trump" with 51%)	–	16% (Note: "Would consider voting for Trump" with 13%; "Don't know/no answer" with 3%)
HarrisX/The Hill	Mar 23–24, 2019	1,000 (RV)	± 3.1%	–	46% (Note: "Would never consider voting for Trump" with 46%)	–	54% (Note: "Would consider voting for Trump" with 54%)
ABC/Washington Post	Jan 20–23, 2019	1,004 (A)	± 3.5%	28%	56% (Note: "Would definitely not consider voting for Trump" with 56%)	–	15% (Note: "Would consider voting for Trump" with 14%; "No opinion" with 1%)
Morning Consult/Politico	Jan 18–22, 2019	1,996 (RV)	± 2%	35%	57% (Note: Listed as "Someone else")	3%	6%

== See also ==
- Statewide opinion polling for the 2020 United States presidential election
- Nationwide opinion polling for the 2020 Democratic Party presidential primaries
- Statewide opinion polling for the 2020 Democratic Party presidential primaries
- Opinion polling for the 2020 Republican Party presidential primaries
- 2020 Democratic National Convention
- 2020 Republican National Convention
- Opinion polling on the first Donald Trump administration

== Notes ==
Partisan clients
