= Stagwell =

American marketing group

Stagwell Inc.
- Formerly: The Stagwell Group; MDC Partners
- Traded as: Nasdaq: STGW
- Industry: Advertising, marketing, communications, media
- Founded: 2015; 11 years ago
- Founder: Mark Penn
- Headquarters: Washington, D.C.
- Key people: Mark Penn (CEO); Ryan Greene (CFO); Jason Reid (CSO); Lena Petersen (CBCO)
- Website: www.stagwellglobal.com

Stagwell Inc., formerly The Stagwell Group, is a global marketing and communications group founded in 2015 by Mark Penn. In 2020, The Stagwell Group announced plans to merge with its affiliate MDC Partners. The merger was completed in August 2021.

Known partners include 72 and Sunny, Left Field Labs, Anomaly, Doner, Forsman & Bodenfors, Code and Theory, Instrument, Locaria, Assembly, Gale, Allison Worldwide, SKDK (SKDKnickerbocker), HUNTER, Harris Poll, and NRG.

In September 2025, Stagwell became the subject of media scrutiny after the investigative outlet Drop Site News published leaked internal strategy documents detailing the firm's public relations work for the Israeli government. The leak revealed that the Israeli Ministry of Foreign Affairs had commissioned Stagwell to conduct polling and develop campaign messaging to rehabilitate Israel's global image amid the ongoing conflict in Gaza, prompting public and industry backlash regarding the ethics of wartime marketing.

== History ==
Mark Penn founded The Stagwell Group in 2015. Penn founded The Stagwell Group with a $250 million investment from former Microsoft CEO Steve Ballmer.

In 2017, Stagwell acquired Forward3D, Scout and also acquired Observatory from CAA. The company also acquired pilot movie testing assets from Nielsen and combined them with NRG, and acquired mobile research assets from Nielsen to form HarrisX. In 2018, Stagwell acquired Ink and later ReputationDefender. Stagwell also secured a $260 million investment from AlpInvest Partners. In 2020, Stagwell acquired Seward Square Strategies as part of SKDK, as well as Headliner Labs as part of ForwardPMK. In August 2021, following the merger of The Stagwell Group with MDC Partners, Stagwell formed Stagwell Media Network, a group of multichannel agencies. In September 2021, ReputationDefender was sold to Norton. In July 2022, Stagwell acquired Apollo Program, an AI-powered SaaS platform. In 2023, Stagwell acquired Left Field Labs, a creative technology partner, to strengthen capabilities in AI, digital transformation, and immersive experiences. That same year, Stagwell also announced a partnership with political news and polling site RealClearPolitics for the 2024 U.S. presidential election.

In 2019, Stagwell invested $100 million into MDC Partners. Stagwell CEO Mark Penn was then appointed CEO of MDC Partners. On December 21, 2020, the firms announced their intent to merge. On August 23, 2021, Stagwell announced the completion of the merger and the creation of Stagwell Inc. (NASDAQ: STGW) as the merged entity with Mark Penn as chairman and CEO of the combined company. The merged company will be headquartered in New York, with significant offices in Washington, DC.

== Working with Israel ==
Stagwell is the parent company of several American firms who have worked with Israel under the Foreign Agents Registration Act, including SKDK LLC, Davis Media NY LLC, and Targeted Communications Global, contracted through Havas Media.

In July 2025, Stagwell was commissioned by Israel's Ministry of Foreign Affairs to conduct a poll of Americans showing 66% of respondents believe that Israel had killed mostly civilians in Gaza.

In June 2026, FARA disclosures showed Targeted Communications Global had received $9.9 million from the Israeli government to receive and promote content on American social media, and purchased almost $2 million in ads on X, $40,000 in conservative media outlet Breitbart, and $7,500 in the Daily Caller.

Responsible Statecraft reported that Targeted Communications Global shared personnel with Targeted Victory, a Republican consulting firm. SKDK, a Democratic-aligned firm, was hired by the Israeli government in 2025 for a $600,000 deal, including pitching the Israeli families of hostages for broadcast television appearances. SKDK subsequently dropped Israel as a client in September 2025 and is no longer registered as a foreign agent.
