= Statewide opinion polling for the 2008 United States presidential election =

Statewide public opinion polls that were conducted relating to the 2008 United States presidential election are as follows.

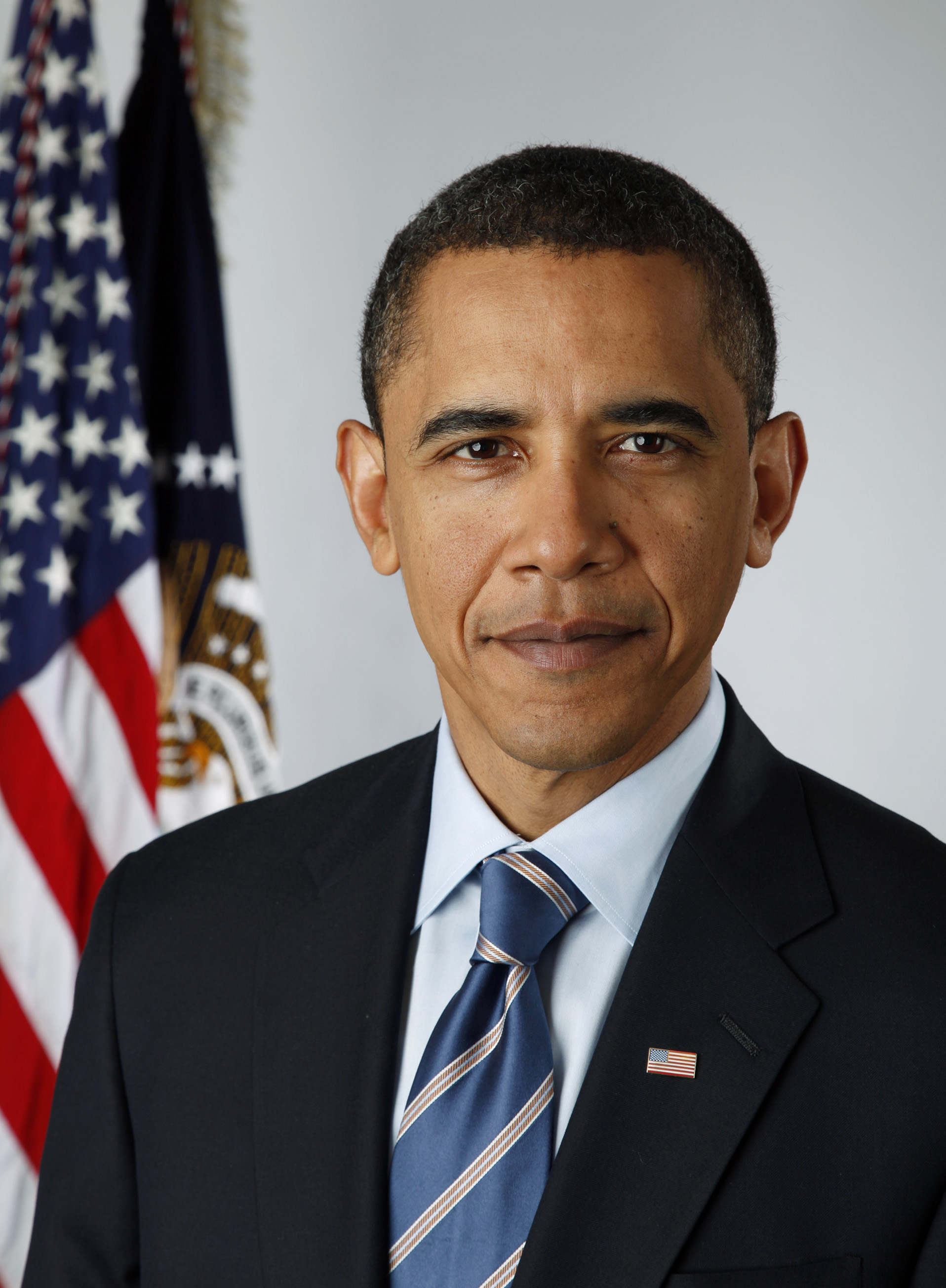
Democratic nominee
Barack Obama

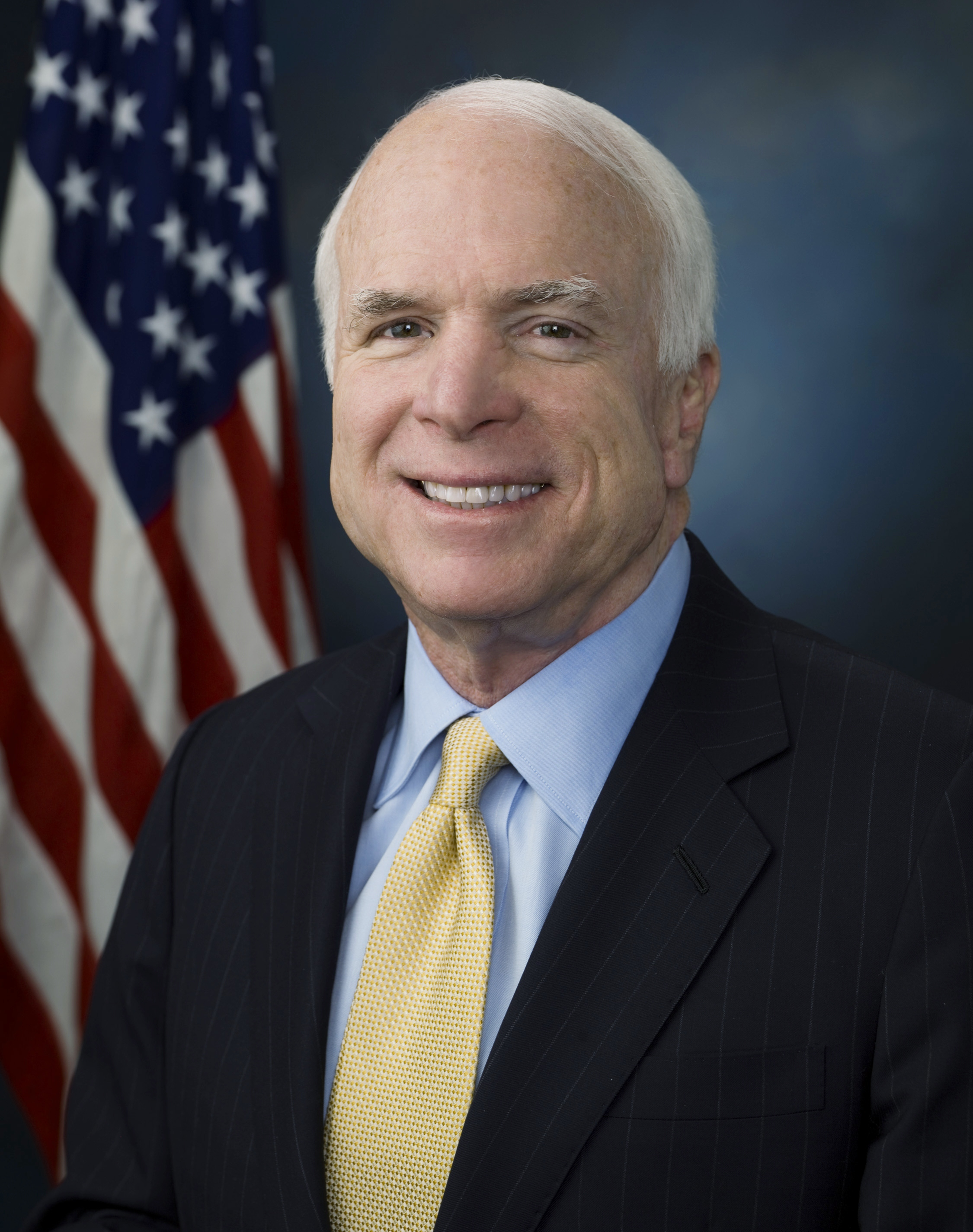
Republican nominee
John McCain

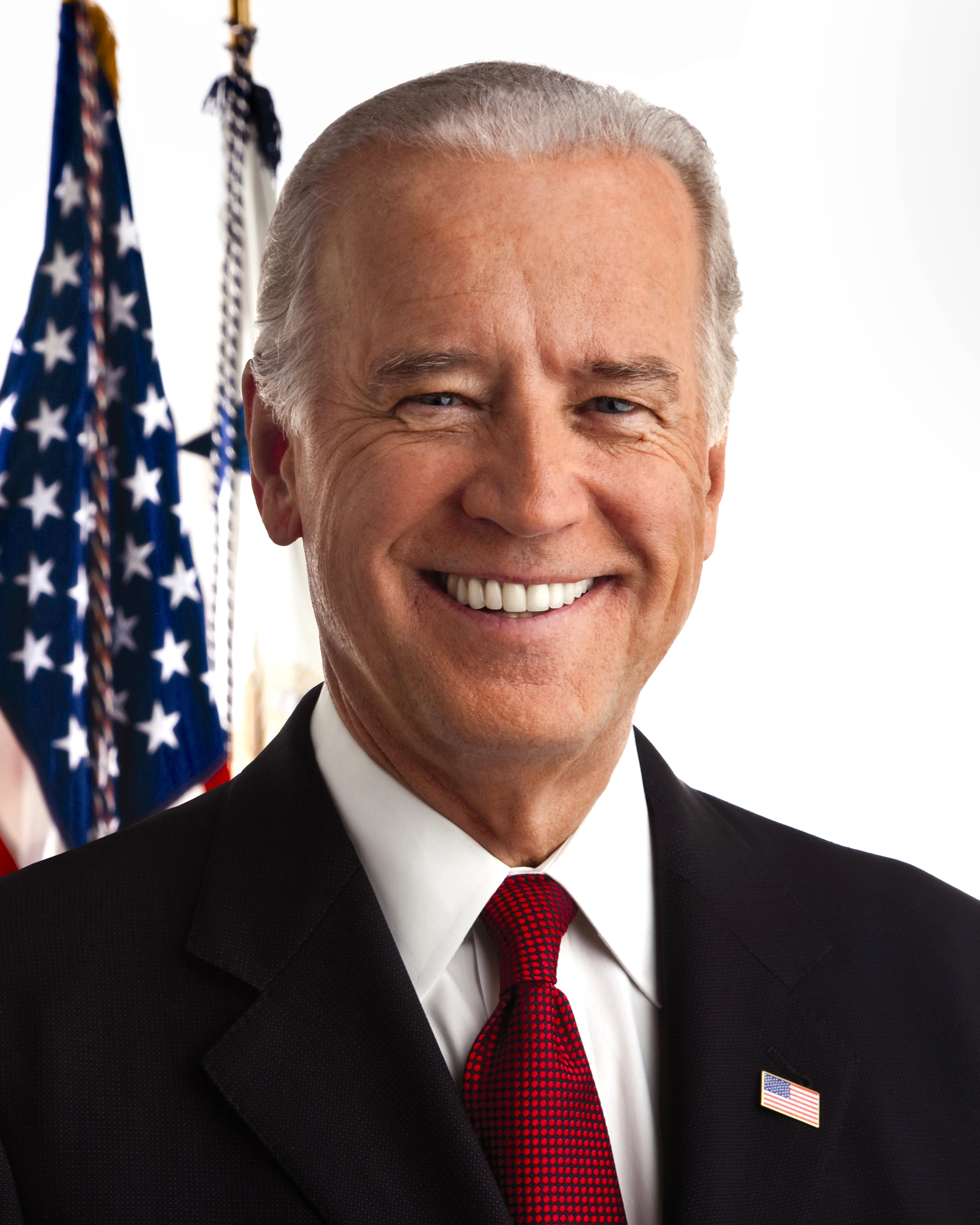
Democratic vice presidential nominee
Joe Biden

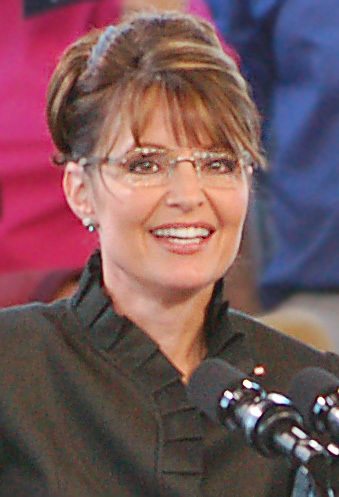
Republican vice presidential nominee
Sarah Palin

== Opinion polling ==
=== Alabama ===
9 electoral votes
(Republican in 2000 & 2004)

Poll Source	Date administered (2008)	Barack Obama	John McCain	Margin	Sample size	Margin of error
Polimetrix/YouGov	October 18 – November 1	39%	57%	18	452 RV	Not reported
WKRG-TV Mobile-Pensacola/SurveyUSA	October 27–28	36%	61%	25	650 LV	±3.7%
Alabama Education Association/Capital Survey Research Center	October 15–16	34%	54%	20	606 LV	±4%
WKRG-TV Mobile-Pensacola/SurveyUSA	October 8–9	35%	62%	27	697 LV	±3.7%
Alabama Education Association/Capital Survey Research Center	October 2–7	35%	55%	20	554 LV	±4%
Rasmussen Reports/Pulse Opinion Research	September 22	39%	60%	21	500 LV	±4%
WKRG-TV Mobile-Pensacola/SurveyUSA	September 16–17	34%	64%	30	655 LV	±3.8%
American Research Group	September 13–16	36%	58%	22	600 LV	±4%
Press Register/University of South Alabama	September 8–15	25%	52%	27	406 LV	±5%
Alabama Education Association/Capital Survey Research Center	September 3–4, 8–9	35%	54.8%	19.8	606 LV	±4%
Rasmussen Reports/Pulse Opinion Research	July 31	37%	55%	18	500 LV	±4%
Alabama Education Association/Capital Survey Research Center	July 29–31	34%	47%	13	571 LV	±4.1%
Alabama Education Association/Capital Survey Research Center	June 25 – July 1	36.4%	48.8%	12.4	536 LV	±4.3%
Rasmussen Reports/Pulse Opinion Research	June 26	36%	51%	15	500 LV	±4%
Alabama Education Association/Capital Survey Research Center	May 15 – June 2	33%	57%	24	607 LV	Not reported
Rasmussen Reports/Pulse Opinion Research	May 27	32%	60%	28	500 LV	±4%
Alabama Education Association/Capital Survey Research Center	April 16–24	36.2%	55.3%	19.1	887 RV	±3.1%
WKRG-TV Mobile-Pensacola/SurveyUSA	April 11–13	32%	64%	32	540 RV	±4.1%
Rasmussen Reports/Pulse Opinion Research	April 2	37%	55%	18	500 LV	±4.5%
Press Register/University of South Alabama	March 24–27	30%	57%	27	413 LV	Not reported
WKRG-TV Mobile-Pensacola/SurveyUSA	March 14–16	35%	62%	27	544 RV	±4.2%
SurveyUSA	February 16–28	40%	54%	14	601 RV	±4.1%
WKRG-TV Mobile-Pensacola/SurveyUSA	February 15–17	34%	58%	24	554 RV	±4.2%
WKRG-TV Mobile-Pensacola/SurveyUSA	December 13–15, 2007	36%	54%	18	544 RV	±4.3%
WKRG-TV Mobile-Pensacola/SurveyUSA	November 9–11, 2007	35%	56%	21	532 RV	±4.3%
WKRG-TV Mobile-Pensacola/SurveyUSA	March 12, 2007	36%	55%	19	Not reported	Not reported
WKRG-TV Mobile-Pensacola/SurveyUSA	February 12, 2007	32%	61%	29	Not reported	Not reported
WKRG-TV Mobile-Pensacola/SurveyUSA	January 15, 2007	36%	53%	17	Not reported	Not reported

Four-way race

Poll Source	Date administered (2008)	Barack Obama	John McCain	Bob Barr	Ralph Nader	Margin	Sample size	Margin of error
Zogby Interactive	June 11–30	36%	47%	4%	<1%	11	481 LV	±4.6%

=== Alaska ===
3 electoral votes
(Republican in 2000 & 2004)

Poll Source	Date administered (2008)	Barack Obama	John McCain	Margin	Sample size	Margin of error
American Research Group	November 1–3	43%	55%	12	600 LV	±4%
Hays Research Group	November 2	44.6%	49.3%	4.7	400 A	±4.9%
Polimetrix/YouGov	October 18 – November 1	38%	55%	17	358 LV	Not reported
Dittman Research	October 27–29	37%	56%	19	489 LV	Not reported
Rasmussen Reports/Pulse Opinion Research	October 28	41%	57%	16	500 LV	±4.5%
The Anchorage Press/The Frontiersman/KENI 650 AM/KTUU Channel 2/Ivan Moore Research	October 17–19	42%	53%	11	500 LV	±4.4%
Rasmussen Reports/Pulse Opinion Research	October 6	40%	55%	15	500 LV	Not reported
The Anchorage Press/The Frontiersman/KENI 650 AM/KTUU Channel 2/Ivan Moore Research	October 3–6	38%	55%	17	500 LV	Not reported
Fairleigh Dickinson University (PublicMind)	September 17–21	37%	55%	18	601 LV	±4%
American Research Group	September 9–11	36%	60%	24	600 LV	±4%
Rasmussen Reports/Pulse Opinion Research	September 9	33%	64%	31	500 LV	±4.5%
The Anchorage Press/The Frontiersman/KENI 650AM/KTUU Channel 2/Ivan Moore Research	August 30 – September 2	34.9%	53.5%	18.6	500 LV	Not reported
American Viewpoint (R)	August 30 – September 2	33%	57%	24	400 RV	Not reported
Rasmussen Reports/Pulse Opinion Research	July 30	42%	48%	6	500 LV	±4.5%
Ivan Moore Research	July 18–22, 2008	44.3%	46.7%	2.4	504 LV	Not reported
Rasmussen Reports/Pulse Opinion Research	July 17	44%	49%	5	500 LV	±4.5%
Rasmussen Reports/Pulse Opinion Research	June 16	41%	45%	4	500 LV	±4%
Rasmussen Reports/Pulse Opinion Research	May 14	41%	50%	9	500 LV	±4%
	April 7	43%	48%	5	500 LV	±4.5%
SurveyUSA	February 26–29	43%	48%	5	617 RV	±4%

Three-way race

Poll source	Date administered (2008)	Barack Obama	John McCain	Bob Barr	Ralph Nader	Margin	Sample size	Margin of error
International Brotherhood of Electrical Workers Local 1457/Hays Research Group (D)	August 6–7	45%	40%	N/A	2%	5	400 A	±4.9%
Democratic Senatorial Campaign Committee/Global Strategy Group (D)	June 5–10	42%	44%	3%	N/A	2	600 LV	Not reported

=== Arizona ===
10 electoral votes
(Republican in 2000 & 2004)

Poll Source	Date administered (2008)	Barack Obama	John McCain	Margin	Sample size	Margin of error
Polimetrix/YouGov	October 18 – November 1	46%	50%	4	682 RV	Not reported
American Research Group	October 28–30	46%	50%	4	600 LV	±4%
NBC News/Mason-Dixon Polling & Research	October 27–28	44%	48%	4	600 LV	±4%
CNN/Time/Opinion Research Corporation	October 23–28	46%	53%	7	897 LV	±3.5%
Project New West/Myers Research/Myers Research/Grove Research (D)	October 23–25	44%	48%	4	600 LV	±4%
University of Washington/Northern Arizona University	October 18–27	41%	49%	8	600 RV	±4.0%
Channel Eight/KAET-TV/Arizona State University	October 23–26	44%	46%	2	1,019 RV	±3.0%
Rasmussen Reports/Pulse Opinion Research	October 26	46%	51%	5	500 LV	±4.5%
Zimmerman & Associates	October 16–19	41.5%	43.5%	2	408 LV	±4.9%
Rasmussen Reports/Pulse Opinion Research	September 29	38%	59%	21	500 LV	±4.5%
Channel Eight/KAET-TV/Arizona State University	September 26–28	38%	45%	7	975 RV	±3.1%
Project New West/Myers Research/Myers Research/Grove Research (D)	September 14–16	40%	54%	14	600 LV	±4%
American Research Group	September 11–14	39%	57%	18	600 LV	±4%
Las Vegas Review-Journal/Mason-Dixon Polling & Research	August 13–15	41%	47%	6	400 LV	±5%
Public Policy Polling	July 30–31	40%	52%	12	1,000 LV	±3%
Rasmussen Reports/Pulse Opinion Research	July 30	38%	57%	19	500 LV	±4.5%
Rasmussen Reports/Pulse Opinion Research	June 25	40%	49%	9	500 LV	±4.5%
Channel Eight/KAET-TV/Arizona State University	June 20–21	28%	38%	10	350 RV	±5.2%
Behavior Research Center (Rocky Mountain Poll)	May 12–20	39%	50%	11	630 RV	±4%
Channel Eight/KAET-TV/Arizona State University	April 24–27	38%	47%	9	577 RV	±4%
Rasmussen Reports/Pulse Opinion Research	April 15	37%	57%	20	500 LV	±4.5%
Northern Arizona University	March 30 – April 8	33%	55%	22	369 LV	±5%
SurveyUSA	February 26–28	39%	51%	12	613 RV	±4%
Channel Eight/KAET-TV/Arizona State University	February 21–24	38%	49%	11	552 RV	±4.1%
Rasmussen Reports/Pulse Opinion Research	November 28, 2007	33%	55%	22	500 LV	±4.5%
Rasmussen Reports/Pulse Opinion Research	October 3, 2007	36%	50%	14	500 LV	Not reported
Channel Eight/KAET-TV/Arizona State University	August 23–26, 2007	34%	48%	14	738 RV	±3.6%
Behavior Research Center (Rocky Mountain Poll)	May 24–29, 2007	37%	51%	14	628 RV	±3.9%
Northern Arizona University	April 13–19, 2007	39%	54%	15	493 RV	Not reported
Behavior Research Center (Rocky Mountain Poll)	March 10–21, 2007	32%	57%	25	600 RV	±3.9%
Behavior Research Center (Rocky Mountain Poll)	February 12–22, 2007	33%	56%	23	629 RV	±3.9%

Four-way race

Poll Source	Date administered (2008)	Barack Obama	John McCain	Bob Barr	Ralph Nader	Margin	Sample size	Margin of error
Channel Eight/KAET-TV/Arizona State University	August 14–16	30%	40%	<1%	2	10	402 RV	±4.9%
Zogby Interactive	June 11–30	42%	39%	7%	2%	3	1,142 LV	±3.0%

=== Arkansas ===
6 electoral votes
(Republican in 2000 & 2004)

Poll Source	Date administered (2008)	Barack Obama	John McCain	Margin	Sample size	Margin of error
Polimetrix/YouGov	October 18 – November 1	41%	53%	12	491 RV	Not reported
American Research Group	October 28–31	44%	51%	7	600 LV	±4%
Rasmussen Reports/Pulse Opinion Research	October 27	44%	54%	10	500 LV	±4.5%
University of Arkansas	October 1–22	36%	51%	15	1,441 RV	±2.5%
Rasmussen Reports/Pulse Opinion Research	September 22	42%	51%	9	500 LV	±4.5%
American Research Group	September 19–22	41%	53%	12	600 LV	±4%
Rasmussen Reports/Pulse Opinion Research	July 17	39%	52%	13	500 LV	±4.5%
	June 12	39%	48%	9	500 LV	±4.5%
Rasmussen Reports/Pulse Opinion Research	May 12	33%	57%	24	500 LV	±4.5%
Rasmussen Reports/Pulse Opinion Research	March 18	30%	59%	29	500 LV	±4.5%
University of Central Arkansas/Opinion Research Associates	March 6–11	27%	43%	16	500 RV	±4.5%
SurveyUSA	February 26–28	33%	53%	20	586 RV	±4.1%

Four-way race

Poll Source	Date administered (2008)	Barack Obama	John McCain	Bob Barr	Ralph Nader	Margin	Sample size	Margin of error
Zogby Interactive	June 11–30	41%	39%	4%	1%	2	461 LV	±4.7%

=== California ===
55 electoral votes
(Democrat in 2000 & 2004)

Poll Source	Date administered (2008)	Barack Obama	John McCain	Margin	Sample size	Margin of error
Polimetrix/YouGov	October 18 – November 1	55%	40%	15	999 RV	Not reported
KABC-TV Los Angeles/KFSN-TV Fresno/KGTV-TV San Diego/KPIX-TV San Francisco/SurveyUSA	October 29–31	60%	36%	24	637 LV	±3.9%
Field Research Corporation (Field Poll)	October 18–28	55%	33%	22	966 LV	±3.3%
Rasmussen Reports/Pulse Opinion Research	October 25	61%	34%	27	500 LV	±4.5%
Public Policy Institute of California	October 12–19	56%	33%	23	1,186 LV	±3%
KABC-TV Los Angeles/KFSN-TV Fresno/KGTV-TV San Diego/KPIX-TV San Francisco/SurveyUSA	October 15–16	59%	35%	24	615 LV	±4%
Rasmussen Reports/Pulse Opinion Research	October 9	56%	40%	16	500 LV	±4.5%
KABC-TV Los Angeles/KFSN-TV Fresno/KGTV-TV San Diego/KPIX-TV San Francisco/SurveyUSA	October 4–5	55%	39%	16	670 LV	±3.8%
KABC-TV Los Angeles/KFSN-TV Fresno/KGTV-TV San Diego/KPIX-TV San Francisco/SurveyUSA	September 23–25	53%	43%	10	661 LV	±3.9%
Rasmussen Reports/Pulse Opinion Research	September 22	56%	39%	17	500 LV	±4.5%
American Research Group	September 18–20	53%	39%	14	600 LV	±4%
Public Policy Institute of California	September 9–16	50%	40%	10	1,157 LV	±3%
Field Research Corporation (Field Poll)	September 5–14	52%	36%	16	830 LV	±3.5%
Rasmussen Reports/Pulse Opinion Research	August 21	54%	41%	13	500 LV	±4.5%
Public Policy Institute of California	August 12–19	48%	39%	9	1,047 LV	±3%
Rasmussen Reports/Pulse Opinion Research	July 24	52%	42%	10	500 LV	±4.5%
Public Policy Institute of California	July 8–22	50%	35%	15	1,401 LV	±3%
Field Research Corporation (Field Poll)	July 8–14	54%	30%	24	672 LV	±3.9%
Rasmussen Reports/Pulse Opinion Research	June 23	58%	30%	28	500 LV	±4.5%
KABC-TV Los Angeles/KFSN-TV Fresno/KGTV-TV San Diego/KPIX-TV San Francisco/SurveyUSA	June 17–19	53%	41%	12	503 LV	±4.5%
Field Research Corporation (Field Poll)	May 16–27	52%	35%	17	914 LV	±3.4%
KTLA/Los Angeles Times	May 20–21	47%	40%	7	705 RV	±4%
KABC-TV Los Angeles/KFSN-TV Fresno/KGTV-TV San Diego/KPIX-TV San Francisco/SurveyUSA	May 16–18	49%	41%	8	600 RV	±4.1%
Public Policy Institute of California	May 12–18	54%	37%	17	1,086 LV	±3%
Rasmussen Reports/Pulse Opinion Research	April 16	50%	43%	7	500 LV	±4.5%
KABC-TV Los Angeles/KFSN-TV Fresno/KGTV-TV San Diego/KPIX-TV San Francisco/SurveyUSA	April 11–13	50%	43%	7	503 RV	±4.5%
Public Policy Institute of California	March 11–18	49%	40%	9	1,077 LV	±3%
KABC-TV Los Angeles/KFSN-TV Fresno/KGTV-TV San Diego/KPIX-TV San Francisco/SurveyUSA	March 14–16	54%	40%	14	489 RV	±4.5%
Rasmussen Reports/Pulse Opinion Research	March 12	53%	38%	15	500 LV	±4.5%
SurveyUSA	February 26–28	51%	40%	11	593 RV	±4.1%
KABC-TV Los Angeles/KFSN-TV Fresno/KGTV-TV San Diego/KPIX-TV San Francisco/SurveyUSA	February 15–17	61%	34%	27	512 RV	±4.3%
Field Research Corporation (Field Poll)	January 25 – February 1	47%	40%	7	Not reported	Not reported
KABC-TV Los Angeles/KFSN-TV Fresno/KGTV-TV San Diego/KPIX-TV San Francisco/SurveyUSA	January 20–21	50%	44%	6	519 RV	±4.4%
KABC-TV Los Angeles/KFSN-TV Fresno/KGTV-TV San Diego/KPIX-TV San Francisco/SurveyUSA	December 15–17	52%	39%	13	512 RV	±4.4%
Field Research Corporation (Field Poll)	December 10–17	50%	36%	14	1,053 LV	±4.5%
KABC-TV Los Angeles/KFSN-TV Fresno/KGTV-TV San Diego/KPIX-TV San Francisco/SurveyUSA	November 9–11, 2007	52%	39%	13	502 RV	±4.5%
Field Research Corporation (Field Poll)	October 11–21, 2007	50%	33%	17	Not reported	Not reported
Field Research Corporation (Field Poll)	August 3–12, 2007	49%	36%	13	Not reported	Not reported
Field Research Corporation (Field Poll)	March 21–31, 2007	51%	39%	12	802 LV	±5%

Four-way race

Poll Source	Date administered (2008)	Barack Obama	John McCain	Bob Barr	Ralph Nader	Margin	Sample size	Margin of error
Field Research Corporation (Field Poll)	September 5–14	52%	36%	1%	1%	16	830 LV	±3.5%
Zogby Interactive	June 11–30	52%	32%	5%	1%	20	4,557 LV	±1.5%

=== Colorado ===
9 electoral votes
(Republican in 2000 & 2004)

Poll Source	Date administered (2008)	Barack Obama	John McCain	Margin	Sample size	Margin of error
Fox News/Rasmussen Reports/Pulse Opinion Research	November 2	51%	47%	4	1,000 LV	±3%
Polimetrix/YouGov	October 18 – November 1	55%	40%	15	685 RV	Not reported
American Research Group	October 28–30	52%	45%	7	600 LV	±4%
Public Policy Polling	October 28–30	54%	44%	10	2,023 LV	±2.2%
Denver Post/Mason-Dixon Polling & Research	October 28–29	49%	44%	5	625 LV	±4%
Marist College	October 27–28	51%	45%	6	682 LV	±4%
CNN/Time/Opinion Research Corporation	October 23–28	53%	45%	8	774 LV	±3.5%
Allstate/National Journal/Financial Dynamics	October 23–27	48%	44%	4	409 RV	±4.9%
Fox News/Rasmussen Reports/Pulse Opinion Research	October 26	50%	46%	4	1,000 LV	±3%
Politico/InsiderAdvantage	October 26	53%	45%	8	636 LV	±3.8%
Associated Press/Roper/GfK Group	October 22–26	50%	41%	9	626 LV	±3.9%
Rocky Mountain News/CBS4 News/Public Opinion Strategies/RBI Strategies	October 21–23	52%	40%	12	500 LV	±4.4%
Poll Position/InsiderAdvantage	October 20	51%	46%	5	576 LV	±4%
Zogby Interactive	October 17–20	48.2%	47.9%	0.3	951 LV	±3.2%
Fox News/Rasmussen Reports/Pulse Opinion Research	October 19	51%	46%	5	1,000 LV	±3%
Rasmussen Reports/Pulse Opinion Research	October 16	52%	45%	7	700 LV	±4%
CNN/Time/Opinion Research Corporation	October 11–14	51%	47%	4	762 LV	±3.5%
Washington Post/Wall Street Journal/Quinnipiac University	October 8–12	52%	43%	9	1,088 LV	±3%
Public Policy Polling	October 8–10	52%	42%	10	1,331 LV	±2.7%
Poll Position/InsiderAdvantage	October 6	51%	45%	6	485 LV	±5%
Fox News/Rasmussen Reports/Pulse Opinion Research	October 5	51%	45%	6	1,000 LV	±3%
Denver Post/Mason-Dixon Polling & Research	September 29 – October 1	44%	44%	Tied	625 LV	±4%
Fox News/Rasmussen Reports/Pulse Opinion Research	September 28	49%	48%	1	500 LV	±4.5%
American Research Group	September 23–25	45%	48%	3	600 LV	±4%
Poll Position/InsiderAdvantage	September 23	50%	41%	9	505 LV	±4.3%
Rasmussen Reports/Pulse Opinion Research	September 23	50%	46%	4	700 LV	±4%
CNN/Time/Opinion Research Corporation	September 21–23	51%	47%	4	794 LV	±3.5%
Economic Development Council of Colorado/Ciruli Associates	September 19–23	44%	43%	1	501 LV	±4.4%
Public Policy Polling	September 20–21	51%	44%	7	1,084 LV	±3.0%
Washington Post/Wall Street Journal/Quinnipiac University	September 14–21	49%	45%	4	1,418 LV	±2.6%
Poll Position/InsiderAdvantage	September 17	51%	41%	10	508 LV	±4.3%
Allstate/National Journal/Financial Dynamics	September 11–15	45%	44%	1	400 RV	±4.9%
Fox News/Rasmussen Reports/Pulse Opinion Research	September 14	46%	48%	2	500 LV	±4.5%
American Research Group	September 10–13	44%	46%	2	600 LV	±4%
Zogby Interactive	September 9–12	45.5%	47.5%	2	825 LV	±3.5%
Poll Position/InsiderAdvantage	September 10	49%	46%	3	501 LV	±4.3%
Public Policy Polling	September 7–9	47%	46%	1	1,078 LV	±3%
Fox News/Rasmussen Reports/Pulse Opinion Research	September 7	49%	46%	3	500 LV	±4.5%
National Republican Senatorial Committee/Tarrance Group (R)	September 2–3	45%	47%	2	495 LV	±4.5%
CNN/Time/Opinion Research Corporation	August 24–26	46%	47%	1	670 RV	±3.5%
Hill Research Consultants (R)	August 23–24	43%	40%	3	553 LV	±4.2%
Quinnipiac University	August 15–21	46%	47%	1	1,060 LV	±3%
Zogby Interactive	August 15–19	44%	41%	3	717 LV	±3.7%
Las Vegas Review-Journal/Mason-Dixon Polling & Research	August 13–15	46%	43%	3	400 LV	±5%
Rasmussen Reports/Pulse Opinion Research	August 13	48%	49%	1	700 LV	±4%
Public Policy Polling	August 5–7	48%	44%	4	933 LV	±3.2%
Keith Frederick Polls	July 16–22	45%	41%	4	700 RV	±3.7%
Washington Post/Wall Street Journal/Quinnipiac University	July 14–22	44%	46%	2	1,425 LV	±2.6%
Rasmussen Reports/Pulse Opinion Research	July 21	50%	47%	3	500 LV	±4.5%
Public Policy Polling	July 9–10	47%	43%	4	1,050 LV	±3.0%
Washington Post/Wall Street Journal/Quinnipiac University	June 17–24	49%	44%	5	1,351 LV	±2.7%
Rasmussen Reports/Pulse Opinion Research	June 17	43%	41%	2	500 LV	±4.5%
Rasmussen Reports/Pulse Opinion Research	May 19	48%	42%	6	500 LV	±4.5%
Rasmussen Reports/Pulse Opinion Research	April 16	46%	43%	3	500 LV	±4.5%
New Leadership USA/TargetPoint (R)	March 31 – April 7	39%	51%	12	604 LV	±4%
Rasmussen Reports/Pulse Opinion Research	March 17	46%	46%	Tied	500 LV	±4.5%
SurveyUSA	February 26–28	50%	41%	9	630 RV	±4%
Rasmussen Reports/Pulse Opinion Research	February 11	46%	39%	7	500 LV	±4.5%

Four-way race

Poll Source	Date administered (2008)	Barack Obama	John McCain	Bob Barr	Ralph Nader	Margin	Sample size	Margin of error
Zogby Interactive	August 15–19	44%	38%	8%	2%	6	717 LV	±3.7%
Rocky Mountain News/CBS4 News/Public Opinion Strategies/RBI Strategies	August 11–13	41%	44%	3%	2%	3	500 RV	±4.38%
Zogby Interactive	June 11–30	40%	38%	8%	2%	2	780 LV	±3.6%

Five-way race

Poll Source	Date administered (2008)	Barack Obama	John McCain	Bob Barr	Ralph Nader	Cynthia McKinney	Margin	Sample size	Margin of error
Associated Press/Roper/GfK Group	October 22–26	50%	41%	1%	0%	0%	9	626 LV	±3.9%
Suffolk University	October 10–13	47%	43%	1%	2%	0%	4	600 LV	±4%
Suffolk University	August 21–24	44%	39%	2%	2%	0%	5	450 LV	±4.6%

=== Connecticut ===
7 electoral votes
(Democrat in 2000 & 2004)

Poll Source	Date administered (2008)	Barack Obama	John McCain	Margin	Sample size	Margin of error
Polimetrix/YouGov	October 18 – November 1	58%	37%	21	704 RV	Not reported
Hartford Courant/University of Connecticut	October 18–22	56%	31%	25	502 LV	±4%
Rasmussen Reports/Pulse Opinion Research	October 16	56%	39%	17	500 LV	±4.5%
WABC-TV New York/SurveyUSA	September 24–25	54%	38%	16	686 LV	±3.8%
Pulsar Research	September 19–23	49%	35%	14	500 LV	±4%
American Research Group	September 17–19	54%	39%	15	600 LV	±4%
Rasmussen Reports/Pulse Opinion Research	September 16	53%	41%	12	500 LV	±4.5%
Rasmussen Reports/Pulse Opinion Research	July 31	53%	40%	13	500 LV	±4.5%
Rasmussen Reports/Pulse Opinion Research	July 1	52%	35%	17	500 LV	±4.5%
Quinnipiac University	June 26–29	56%	35%	21	2,437 LV	±2%
Rasmussen Reports/Pulse Opinion Research	May 29	47%	44%	3	500 LV	±4.5%
Quinnipiac University	March 19–24	52%	35%	17	1,697 RV	±2.4%
Rasmussen Reports/Pulse Opinion Research	March 11	50%	38%	12	500 LV	±4.5%
SurveyUSA	February 26–28	55%	34%	21	640 RV	±3.9%
Quinnipiac University	May 2–7, 2007	46%	38%	8	1,427 RV	±2.6%
Quinnipiac University	February 9–12, 2007	43%	38%	5	1,087 RV	±3%

Four-way race

Poll Source	Date administered (2008)	Barack Obama	John McCain	Bob Barr	Ralph Nader	Margin	Sample size	Margin of error
Zogby Interactive	June 11–30	48%	32%	5%	2%	16	595 LV	±4.1%

=== Delaware ===
3 electoral votes
(Democrat in 2000 & 2004)

Poll Source	Date administered (2008)	Barack Obama	John McCain	Margin	Sample size	Margin of error
Polimetrix/YouGov	October 18 – November 1	59%	37%	22	346 RV	Not reported
WCAU-TV Philadelphia/SurveyUSA	October 27–28	63%	33%	30	657 LV	±3.8%
Rasmussen Reports/Pulse Opinion Research	October 10	56%	41%	15	500 LV	±4.5%
West Chester University	October 6–8	55.5%	38.4%	17.1	429 LV	±4.8%
WCAU-TV Philadelphia/SurveyUSA	September 22–23	57%	37%	20	703 LV	±3.7%
Fairleigh Dickinson University (PublicMind)	September 17–21	56%	36%	20	601 LV	±4%
American Research Group	September 13–15	51%	40%	11	600 LV	±4%
Rasmussen Reports/Pulse Opinion Research	September 13	55%	43%	12	500 LV	±4.5%
SurveyUSA	February 26–28	50%	41%	9	608 RV	±4.1%

=== District of Columbia ===
3 electoral votes
(Democrat in 2000 & 2004)

Poll Source	Date administered (2008)	Barack Obama	John McCain	Margin	Sample size	Margin of error
Polimetrix/YouGov	October 18 – November 1	81%	15%	66	228 RV	Not reported
American Research Group	September 11–13	82%	13%	69	600 LV	±4%

=== Florida ===
27 electoral votes
(Republican in 2000 & 2004)

Poll Source	Date administered (2008)	Barack Obama	John McCain	Margin	Sample size	Margin of error
WFLA-TV Tampa/WFOR-TV Miami/WFTX-TV Ft. Myers/WKRG-TV Mobile-Pensacola/SurveyUSA	October 31 – November 3	50%	47%	3	691 LV	±3.8%
Reuters/Zogby International	October 31 – November 3	49.2%	48%	1.2	600 LV	±4.1%
Datamar	November 1–2	47%	48.2%	1.2	657 RV	±3.8%
Public Policy Polling	October 31 – November 2	50%	48%	2	1,717 LV	±2.4%
Quinnipiac University	October 27 – November 2	47%	45%	2	1,773 LV	±2.3%
Polimetrix/YouGov	October 18 – November 1	49%	47%	2	1,001 RV	Not reported
American Research Group	October 29–31	50%	46%	4	600 LV	±4%
Datamar	October 29–30	46.7%	46.7%	Tied	995 RV	±3.1%
Mason-Dixon Polling & Research	October 28–29	47%	45%	2	625 LV	±4%
CNN/Time/Opinion Research Corporation	October 23–28	51%	47%	4	747 LV	±3.5%
Florida Chamber of Commerce	October 26–27	45%	41%	4	601 RV	±3.9%
Los Angeles Times/Bloomberg	October 24–27	50%	43%	7	639 LV	±3%
Allstate/National Journal/Financial Dynamics	October 23–27	48%	44%	4	402 RV	±4.9%
Datamar	October 25–26	49.2%	44.4%	4.8	630 RV	±3.9%
Reuters/Zogby International	October 23–26	47.2%	46.9%	0.3	600 LV	±4.1%
Associated Press/Roper/GfK Group	October 22–26	45%	43%	2	600 LV	±4.0%
Quinnipiac University	October 22–26	47%	45%	2	1,435 LV	±2.6%
Politico/InsiderAdvantage	October 22	48%	47%	1	562 LV	±4%
St. Petersburg Times/Miami Herald/Bay News 9/The Polling Company Inc./Schroth, Eldon & Associates Research	October 20–22	49%	42%	7	800 LV	±3.5%
NBC News/Mason-Dixon Polling & Research	October 20–21	45%	46%	1	625 LV	±4%
Quinnipiac University	October 16–21	49%	44%	5	1,433 LV	±2.6%
Zogby Interactive	October 17–20	48.8%	45.2%	3.6	1,252 LV	±2.8%
Public Policy Polling	October 16–19	48%	47%	1	1,158 LV	±2.9%
WFLA-TV Tampa/WFOR-TV Miami/WFTX-TV Ft. Myers/WKRG-TV Mobile-Pensacola/SurveyUSA	October 16	45%	47%	2	553 LV	±4.3%
CNN/Time/Opinion Research Corporation	October 11–14	51%	46%	5	765 LV	±3.5%
Poll Position/InsiderAdvantage	October 13	48%	44%	4	612 LV	±3.8%
Datamar	October 12–13	47.1%	42.1%	5	1,328 RV	±2.7%
Zogby Interactive	October 9–13	48.2%	47.1%	1.1	1,231 LV	±2.9%
Rasmussen Reports/Pulse Opinion Research	October 8	50%	47%	3	700 LV	±4%
Mason-Dixon Polling & Research	October 4–6	48%	46%	2	625 LV	±4%
Poll Position/InsiderAdvantage	September 30	49%	46%	3	532 LV	±4%
CNN/Time/Opinion Research Corporation	September 27–30	51%	47%	4	770 LV	±3.5%
Quinnipiac University	September 27–29	51%	43%	8	836 LV	±3.4%
WFLA-TV Tampa/WFOR-TV Miami/WFTX-TV Ft. Myers/WKRG-TV Mobile-Pensacola/SurveyUSA	September 27–28	47%	48%	1	599 LV	±4.1%
Public Policy Polling	September 27–28	49%	46%	3	941 LV	±3.2%
Quinnipiac University	September 22–26	49%	43%	6	1,161 LV	±2.9%
American Research Group	September 23–25	47%	46%	1	600 LV	±4%
Rasmussen Reports/Pulse Opinion Research	September 24	47%	48%	1	700 LV	±4%
NBC News/Mason-Dixon Polling & Research	September 16–18	47%	45%	2	625 LV	±4%
WFLA-TV Tampa/WFOR-TV Miami/WFTX-TV Ft. Myers/WKRG-TV Mobile-Pensacola/SurveyUSA	September 16–17	45%	51%	6	707 LV	±3.8%
American Research Group	September 14–17	46%	46%	Tied	600 LV	±4%
St. Petersburg Times/Miami Herald/Bay News 9/The Polling Company Inc./Schroth, Eldon & Associates Research	September 14–17	45%	47%	2	800 LV	±3.5%
CNN/Time/Opinion Research Corporation	September 12–16	48%	48%	Tied	907 RV	±3.5%
Allstate/National Journal/Financial Dynamics	September 11–15	44%	44%	Tied	402 RV	±4.9%
Zogby Interactive	September 9–12	41.8%	52.1%	10.3	995 LV	±3.2%
Poll Position/InsiderAdvantage	September 10	42%	50%	8	511 LV	±4.3%
Quinnipiac University	September 5–9	43%	50%	7	1,032 LV	±3.1%
Public Policy Polling	September 6–7	45%	50%	5	986 LV	±3.1%
Mason-Dixon Polling & Research	August 25–26	45%	44%	1	625 LV	±4%
Quinnipiac University	August 17–24	43%	47%	4	1,069 LV	±3%
Florida Chamber of Commerce/The Kitchens Group	August 18–21	39%	42%	3	605 RV	±4.0%
American Research Group	August 18–20	46%	47%	1	600 LV	±4%
Zogby Interactive	August 15–19	40%	45%	5	894 LV	±3.3%
Rasmussen Reports/Pulse Opinion Research	August 18	46%	48%	2	700 LV	±4.5%
WFLA-TV Tampa/WKRG-TV Mobile-Pensacola/SurveyUSA	August 1–3	44%	50%	6	679 LV	±3.8%
Public Policy Polling	July 30 – August 2	44%	47%	3	807 LV	±3.5%
Quinnipiac University	July 23–29	46%	44%	2	1,248 LV	±2.8%
Florida Chamber of Commerce/Fabrizio, McLaughlin & Associates	July 20–28	40%	45%	5	1,600 RV	±2.5%
Rasmussen Reports/Pulse Opinion Research	July 22	49%	47%	2	500 LV	±4.5%
American Research Group	July 19–21	45%	47%	2	600 LV	±4%
War Room Logistics	July 7–8	47.2%	44.5%	2.7	629 RV	±4%
Public Policy Polling	June 26–29	46%	44%	2	723 LV	±3.6%
Rasmussen Reports/Pulse Opinion Research	June 26	41%	48%	7	500 LV	±4.5%
Rasmussen Reports/Pulse Opinion Research	June 18	39%	47%	8	500 LV	±4.5%
American Research Group	June 13–17	49%	44%	5	600 LV	±4%
Quinnipiac University	June 9–16	47%	43%	4	1,453 LV	±2.6%
War Room Logistics	May 21–22	35.5%	58.4%	22.9	645 RV	Not reported
Quinnipiac University	May 13–20	41%	45%	4	1,419 RV	±2.6%
Rasmussen Reports/Pulse Opinion Research	May 19	40%	50%	10	500 LV	±4.5%
Quinnipiac University	April 23–29	43%	44%	1	1,411 RV	±2.6%
Rasmussen Reports/Pulse Opinion Research	April 10	38%	53%	15	500 LV	±4.5%
Quinnipiac University	March 24–31	37%	46%	9	1,136 RV	±2.9%
Public Policy Polling	March 15–16	39%	50%	11	618 LV	±3.9%
Rasmussen Reports/Pulse Opinion Research	March 12	43%	47%	4	500 LV	±4.5%
SurveyUSA	February 26–28	45%	47%	2	632 RV	±4%
Mason-Dixon Polling & Research	February 21–24	37%	47%	10	625 RV	±4%
Rasmussen Reports/Pulse Opinion Research	February 16	37%	53%	16	500 LV	±4.5%
Quinnipiac University	February 6–12	39%	41%	2	1,009 RV	±3.1%
Public Policy Polling	January 4	40%	46%	6	543 LV	±4.2%
St. Petersburg Times/The Polling Company Inc./Schroth, Eldon & Associates Research	November 4, 2007	45%	47%	2	800 RV	±3.5%
Quinnipiac University	October 17–22, 2007	42%	42%	Tied	1,025 RV	±3.1%
Quinnipiac University	October 1–8, 2007	39%	41%	2	869 RV	±3.3%
Quinnipiac University	September 3–9, 2007	39%	42%	3	1,141 RV	±2.9%
Quinnipiac University	July 12–16, 2007	42%	38%	4	1,106 RV	±3%
Quinnipiac University	June 18–25, 2007	42%	42%	Tied	949 RV	±3.2%
Quinnipiac University	May 24 – June 4, 2007	40%	41%	1	1,174 RV	±2.9%
Quinnipiac University	April 17–24, 2007	41%	41%	Tied	987 RV	±3.1%
Quinnipiac University	March 21–27, 2007	39%	45%	6	1,061 RV	±3%
Quinnipiac University	February 25 – March 4, 2007	39%	43%	4	1,125 RV	±2.9%
Quinnipiac University	January 29 – February 4, 2007	40%	42%	2	1,003 RV	±3.1%

Three-way race

Poll Source	Date administered (2008)	Barack Obama	John McCain	Bob Barr	Margin	Sample size	Margin of error
Associated Press/Roper/GfK Group	October 22–26	45%	43%	1	2	600 LV	±4.0%
Poll Position/InsiderAdvantage	August 11	44.2%	47.8%	2.4%	4	418 LV	±5%

Four-way race

Poll Source	Date administered (2008)	Barack Obama	John McCain	Bob Barr	Ralph Nader	Margin	Sample size	Margin of error
Florida Chamber of Commerce (R)	September 30 – October 1	42%	45%	1%	1%	3	619 RV	±4%
Zogby Interactive	August 15–19	40%	43%	5%	1%	3	894 LV	±3.3%
Zogby Interactive	June 11–30	39%	43%	6%	2%	4	3,731 LV	±1.6%

Five-way race

Poll Source	Date administered (2008)	Barack Obama	John McCain	Bob Barr	Ralph Nader	Cynthia McKinney	Margin	Sample size	Margin of error
Fox News/Rasmussen Reports/Pulse Opinion Research	November 2	49%	50%	0%	0%	0%	1	1,000 LV	±3%
Fox News/Rasmussen Reports/Pulse Opinion Research	October 26	51%	47%	0%	0%	0%	4	1,000 LV	±3%
Suffolk University	October 23–26	49%	44%	0%	1%	0%	5	600 LV	±4%
Fox News/Rasmussen Reports/Pulse Opinion Research	October 19	48%	49%	0%	1%	0%	1	1,000 LV	±3%
Hamilton Campaigns	October 10–15	47%	43%	1%	1%	0%	4	700 RV	±3.7%
Fox News/Rasmussen Reports/Pulse Opinion Research	October 12	51%	46%	1%	0%	0%	5	1,000 LV	±3%
Fox News/Rasmussen Reports/Pulse Opinion Research	October 5	52%	45%	0%	1%	0%	7	1,000 LV	±3%
WSVN/Suffolk University	September 27–30	46%	42%	2%	1%	1%	4	600 LV	±4%
Fox News/Rasmussen Reports/Pulse Opinion Research	September 28	47%	47%	0%	1%	0%	Tied	500 LV	±4.5%
Fox News/Rasmussen Reports/Pulse Opinion Research	September 21	46%	51%	0%	0%	0%	5	500 LV	±4.5%
Fox News/Rasmussen Reports/Pulse Opinion Research	September 14	44%	49%	2%	2%	0%	5	500 LV	±4.5%
Fox News/Rasmussen Reports/Pulse Opinion Research	September 7	48%	48%	0%	2%	0%	Tied	500 LV	±4.5%

=== Georgia ===
15 electoral votes
(Republican in 2000 & 2004)

Poll Source	Date administered (2008)	Barack Obama	John McCain	Margin	Sample size	Margin of error
Poll Position/InsiderAdvantage	November 2	47%	48%	1	512 LV	±4%
Public Policy Polling	October 31 – November 2	48%	50%	2	1,253 LV	±2.8%
WMAZ-TV Macon/WXIA-TV Atlanta/SurveyUSA	October 30 – November 2	45%	52%	7	683 LV	±3.8%
Polimetrix/YouGov	October 18 – November 1	47%	50%	3	910 RV	Not reported
Rasmussen Reports/Pulse Opinion Research	October 30	47%	52%	5	500 LV	±4.5%
CNN/Time/Opinion Research Corporation	October 23–28	47%	52%	5	690 LV	±3.5%
Poll Position/Insider Advantage	October 23	48%	47%	1	615 LV	±3.8%
NBC News/Mason-Dixon Research & Polling	October 22–23	43%	49%	6	625 LV	±4%
Rasmussen Reports/Pulse Opinion Research	October 22	46%	51%	5	500 LV	±4.5%
CNN/Time/Opinion Research Corporation	October 11–14	45%	53%	8	718 LV	±3.5%
WMAZ-TV Macon/WXIA-TV Atlanta/SurveyUSA	October 11–12	43%	51%	8	547 LV	±4.3%
Poll Position/InsiderAdvantage	October 9	46%	49%	3	531 LV	±4%
Rasmussen Reports/Pulse Opinion Research	October 7	45%	54%	9	500 LV	±4.5%
Poll Position/InsiderAdvantage	September 30	44%	50%	6	561 LV	±4%
WMAZ-TV Macon/WXIA-TV Atlanta/SurveyUSA	September 28–29	44%	52%	8	677 LV	±3.8%
American Research Group	September 18–21	39%	57%	18	600 LV	±4%
Poll Position/InsiderAdvantage	September 17	43%	51%	8	503 LV	±4.3%
Roll Call Newspaper/Capitol Hill/WMAZ-TV Macon/WXIA-TV Atlanta/SurveyUSA	September 14–16	41%	57%	16	684 LV	±3.8%
Poll Position/InsiderAdvantage	September 10	38%	56%	18	506 LV	±4%
Rasmussen Reports/Pulse Opinion Research	June 4	41%	51%	10	500 LV	±4.5%
Rasmussen Reports/Pulse Opinion Research	May 6	39%	53%	14	500 LV	±4.5%
Rasmussen Reports/Pulse Opinion Research	March 20	40%	53%	13	500 LV	±4.5%
SurveyUSA	February 26–28	41%	54%	13	592 RV	±4.1%

Three-way race

Poll Source	Date administered (2008)	Barack Obama	John McCain	Bob Barr	Margin	Sample size	Margin of error
Poll Position/InsiderAdvantage	October 27	47%	48%	1%	1	637 LV	±3.8%
Rasmussen Reports/Pulse Opinion Research	September 16	43%	54%	0%	11	500 LV	±4.5%
Public Opinion Strategies (R)	September 9–11	35%	56%	1%	21	800 LV	±3.5%
Rasmussen Reports/Pulse Opinion Research	August 14	44%	53%	1%	9	500 LV	±4.5%
Rasmussen Reports/Pulse Opinion Research	July 17	42%	53%	1%	11	500 LV	±4.5%
Poll Position/Majority Opinion/InsiderAdvantage	July 2	44%	46%	4%	2	502 LV	±4.3%
Rasmussen Reports/Pulse Opinion Research	June 26	43%	53%	1%	10	800 LV	±4%
Poll Position/Majority Opinion/InsiderAdvantage	June 18	42.7%	44.3%	5.6%	1.6	408 LV	±5%
Majority Opinion/InsiderAdvantage	May 20	34.8%	45.2%	7.6%	10.4	652 LV	±3.6%

Four-way race

Poll Source	Date administered (2008)	Barack Obama	John McCain	Bob Barr	Ralph Nader	Margin	Sample size	Margin of error
Democracy Corps/Greenberg Quinlan Rosner (D)	October 16–19	44%	46%	2%	2%	2	600 LV	±4%
Zogby Interactive	June 11–30	38%	44%	8%	<1%	6	1,472 LV	±2.6%

=== Hawaii ===
4 electoral votes
(Democrat in 2000 & 2004)

Poll Source	Date administered (2008)	Barack Obama	John McCain	Margin	Sample size	Margin of error
Polimetrix/YouGov	October 18 – November 1	56%	34%	22	337 RV	Not reported
Rasmussen Reports/Pulse Opinion Research	September 23	68%	27%	41	500 LV	±4.5%
American Research Group	September 7–12	63%	32%	31	600 LV	±4%
SurveyUSA	February 26–29	61%	31%	30	592 RV	±4%

=== Idaho ===
4 electoral votes
(Republican in 2000 & 2004)

Poll Source	Date administered (2008)	Barack Obama	John McCain	Margin	Sample size	Margin of error
Polimetrix/YouGov	October 18 – November 1	36%	59%	23	372 RV	Not reported
American Research Group	September 8–10	25%	68%	43	600 LV	±4%
Rasmussen Reports/Pulse Opinion Research	September 9	29%	68%	39	500 LV	±4.5%
Greg Smith & Associates	August 18–22	29%	52%	23	600 LV	±4%
SurveyUSA	February 26–28	39%	52%	13	608 RV	±4.1%

Five-way race

Poll Source	Date administered (2008)	Barack Obama	John McCain	Bob Barr	Ralph Nader	Cynthia McKinney	Margin	Sample size	Margin of error
Harstad Strategic Research, Inc.	October 19–22	32%	55%	1%	1%	0%	23	503 LV	±4.4%

=== Illinois ===
21 electoral votes
(Democrat in 2000 & 2004)

Poll Source	Date administered (2008)	Barack Obama	John McCain	Margin	Sample size	Margin of error
Rasmussen Reports/Pulse Opinion Research	November 1	60%	38%	22	500 LV	±4.5%
Polimetrix/YouGov	October 18 – November 1	58%	39%	19	783 RV	Not reported
Big Ten	October 19–22	61.2%	31.6%	29.6	572 RV	±4%
Rasmussen Reports/Pulse Opinion Research	October 13	56%	39%	17	500 LV	±4.5%
Rasmussen Reports/Pulse Opinion Research	September 17	56%	40%	16	500 LV	±4.5%
Big Ten	September 14–17	52.9%	37%	15.9	628 RV	±4%
American Research Group	September 13–16	51%	45%	6	600 LV	±4%
Rasmussen Reports/Pulse Opinion Research	August 12	55%	40%	15	500 LV	±4.5%
	July 8	52%	41%	11	500 LV	±4.5%
SurveyUSA	February 26–28	60%	31%	29	600 RV	±4%

Four-way race

Poll Source	Date administered (2008)	Barack Obama	John McCain	Bob Barr	Ralph Nader	Margin	Sample size	Margin of error
Chicago Tribune/Market Shares Corporation	October 16–18	56%	32%	0%	2%	24	500 LV	±4.4%
Zogby Interactive	June 11–30	52%	32%	5%	1%	20	1,514 LV	±2.6%

=== Indiana ===
11 electoral votes
(Republican in 2000 & 2004)

Poll Source	Date administered (2008)	Barack Obama	John McCain	Margin	Sample size	Margin of error
Reuters/Zogby International	October 31 – November 3	43.9%	49.1%	5.2	585 LV	±4.1%
Public Policy Polling	October 31 – November 2	49%	48%	1	2,634 LV	±1.9%
Polimetrix/YouGov	October 18 – November 1	45%	53%	8	789 RV	Not reported
American Research Group	October 28–31	48%	48%	Tied	600 LV	±4%
Rasmussen Reports/Pulse Opinion Research	October 28–29	46%	49%	3	500 LV	±4.5%
WTHR-TV/Indianapolis Star/Selzer & Co.	October 26–28	45.9%	45.3%	0.6	606 LV	±4%
Reuters/Zogby International	October 23–26	44%	50.2%	6.2	601 LV	±4.1%
Howey Politics/Gauge Market Research	October 23–24	45%	47%	2	600 LV	±4.1%
WHAS-TV Louisville/SurveyUSA	October 21–22	49%	45%	4	631 LV	4%
Big Ten	October 19–22	51%	41.5%	9.5	586 RV	±4.2%
Zogby Interactive	October 17–20	42.3%	52.8%	10.5	473 LV	±4.6%
Public Policy Polling	October 18–19	48%	46%	2	1,411 LV	±2.6%
Zogby Interactive	October 9–13	44.3%	48.5%	4.2	450 LV	±4.7%
Rasmussen Reports/Pulse Opinion Research	October 7	43%	50%	7	500 LV	±4.5%
CNN/Time/Opinion Research Corporation	October 3–6	46%	51%	5	677 LV	±4%
WCPO-TV Cincinnati/WHAS-TV Louisville/SurveyUSA	September 28–29	45%	48%	3	687 LV	±3.8%
Rasmussen Reports/Pulse Opinion Research	September 17–18	47%	49%	2	500 LV	±4.5%
American Research Group	September 14–18	44%	47%	3	600 LV	±4%
Big Ten	September 14–17	43.2%	46.7%	3.5	612 RV	±4%
WTHR-TV/Indianapolis Star/Selzer & Co.	September 14–16	47%	44%	3	600 LV	±4%
CNN/Time/Opinion Research Corporation	September 13–14	45%	51%	6	890 RV	±3.5%
Howey Politics/Gauge Market Research	August 29–30	43%	45%	2	600 RV	Not reported
Rasmussen Reports/Pulse Opinion Research	August 19–21	43%	49%	6	500 LV	±4.5%
WCPO-TV Cincinnati/WHAS-TV Louisville/SurveyUSA	August 16–18	44%	50%	6	645 LV	±3.9%
WCPO-TV Cincinnati/WHAS-TV Louisville/SurveyUSA	June 21–23	48%	47%	1	627 LV	±4%
Indiana Legislative Insight	May 27 – June 1	39%	47%	8	601 RV	±4%
Mike Downs Center/SurveyUSA	April 28–30	48%	47%	1	1,274 LV	±2.8%
WTHR-TV/Indianapolis Star/Selzer & Co.	April 20–23	49%	41%	8	384 LV	Not reported
Mike Downs Center/SurveyUSA	April 14–16	44%	51%	7	1,254 LV	±2.8%
SurveyUSA	February 26–28	41%	50%	9	575 RV	±4.2%
WHAS-TV Louisville/SurveyUSA	February 3–4	40%	50%	10	499 RV	±4.5%

Three-way race

Poll Source	Date administered (2008)	Barack Obama	John McCain	Bob Barr	Margin	Sample size	Margin of error
Mike Downs Center/SurveyUSA	October 27–30	47%	47%	2%	Tied	900 LV	±3.3%

Four-way race

Poll Source	Date administered (2008)	Barack Obama	John McCain	Bob Barr	Ralph Nader	Margin	Sample size	Margin of error
Zogby Interactive	June 11–30	39%	40%	7%	<1%	1	758 LV	±3.6%

=== Iowa ===
7 electoral votes
(Democrat in 2000)
(Republican in 2004)

Poll Source	Date administered (2008)	Barack Obama	John McCain	Margin	Sample size	Margin of error
Polimetrix/YouGov	October 18 – November 1	52%	41%	11	795 RV	Not reported
Des Moines Register/Selzer & Co.	October 28–31	54%	37%	17	814 LV	±3.4%
KAAL-TV Rochester-Mason City-Austin/WHO-TV Des Moines/SurveyUSA	October 28–29	55%	40%	15	658 LV	±3.9%
Marist College	October 23–24	52%	42%	10	645 LV	±4%
Rasmussen Reports/Pulse Opinion Research	October 23	52%	44%	8	700 LV	±4%
NBC News/Mason-Dixon Research & Polling	October 22–23	51%	40%	11	625 LV	±4%
Big Ten	October 19–22	52.4%	39.1%	13.3	586 LV	±4.2%
KAAL-TV Rochester-Mason City-Austin/WHO-TV Des Moines/SurveyUSA	October 8–9	54%	41%	13	692 LV	±3.8%
Rasmussen Reports/Pulse Opinion Research	September 25	51%	43%	8	700 LV	±4%
Marist College	September 18–21	51%	41%	10	467 LV	±4.5%
American Research Group	September 17–20	51%	44%	7	600 LV	±4%
KAAL-TV Rochester-Mason City-Austin/WHO-TV Des Moines/SurveyUSA	September 17–18	54%	43%	11	702 LV	±3.8%
Big Ten	September 14–17	44.8%	44.8%	Tied	643 RV	±4%
CNN/Time/Opinion Research Corporation	August 31 – September 2	55%	40%	15	828 RV	±3.5%
University of Iowa	August 4–13	49.5%	43.1%	6.4	617 LV	±3.9%
Rasmussen Reports/Pulse Opinion Research	August 7	49%	44%	5	700 LV	±4%
	July 10	51%	41%	10	500 LV	±4.5%
KAAL-TV Rochester-Mason City-Austin/SurveyUSA	June 13–16	49%	45%	4	528 RV	±4.4%
Rasmussen Reports/Pulse Opinion Research	June 10	45%	38%	7	500 LV	±4.5%
KAAL-TV Rochester-Mason City-Austin/SurveyUSA	May 21–22	47%	38%	9	600 RV	±4.1%
Rasmussen Reports/Pulse Opinion Research	May 13	44%	42%	2	500 LV	±4.5%
KAAL-TV Rochester-Mason City-Austin/SurveyUSA	April 11–13	49%	42%	7	553 RV	±4.3%
Rasmussen Reports/Pulse Opinion Research	March 31	46%	42%	4	500 LV	±4.5%
KAAL-TV Rochester-Mason City-Austin/SurveyUSA	March 14–16	50%	44%	6	517 RV	±4.4%
SurveyUSA	February 26–28	50%	41%	9	619 RV	±4%
Des Moines Register/Selzer & Co.	February 17–20	53%	36%	17	647 LV	Not reported
Rasmussen Reports/Pulse Opinion Research	February 18	44%	41%	3	500 LV	±4.5%
KAAL-TV Rochester-Mason City-Austin/SurveyUSA	February 15–17	51%	41%	10	563 RV	±4.2%
KAAL-TV Rochester-Mason City-Austin/SurveyUSA	January 4–6	55%	38%	17	543 RV	±4.3%
KAAL-TV Rochester-Mason City-Austin/SurveyUSA	December 13–15, 2007	51%	39%	12	539 RV	±4.3%
KAAL-TV Rochester-Mason City-Austin/SurveyUSA	November 9–11, 2007	50%	42%	8	546 RV	±4.3%
KAAL-TV Rochester-Mason City-Austin/SurveyUSA	March 9–11, 2007	48%	43%	5	Not reported	Not reported
KAAL-TV Rochester-Mason City-Austin/SurveyUSA	February 9–11, 2007	46%	43%	3	Not reported	Not reported
KAAL-TV Rochester-Mason City-Austin/SurveyUSA	January 12–14, 2007	45%	46%	1	497 RV	±4.5%

Four-way race

Poll Source	Date administered (2008)	Barack Obama	John McCain	Bob Barr	Ralph Nader	Margin	Sample size	Margin of error
Des Moines Register/Selzer & Co.	September 8–10	52%	40%	2%	1%	12	616 LV	±4%
Zogby Interactive	June 11–30	42%	38%	8%	1%	4	641 LV	±3.9%

=== Kansas ===
6 electoral votes
(Republican in 2000 & 2004)

Poll Source	Date administered (2008)	Barack Obama	John McCain	Margin	Sample size	Margin of error
Polimetrix/YouGov	October 18 – November 1	41%	52%	11	499 RV	Not reported
KCTV-TV Kansas City/KWCH-TV Wichita/SurveyUSA	October 27–28	37%	58%	21	626 LV	±3.9%
KCTV-TV Kansas City/KWCH-TV Wichita/SurveyUSA	October 21–22	41%	53%	12	613 LV	±4%
Rasmussen Reports/Pulse Opinion Research	October 13	41%	54%	13	500 LV	±4.5%
KCTV-TV Kansas City/KWCH-TV Wichita/SurveyUSA	September 21–22	41%	53%	12	666 LV	±3.9%
Rasmussen Reports/Pulse Opinion Research	September 18	38%	58%	20	500 LV	±4.5%
KCTV-TV Kansas City/KWCH-TV Wichita/SurveyUSA	August 18–20	35%	58%	23	641 LV	±3.9%
Rasmussen Reports/Pulse Opinion Research	August 11	41%	55%	14	500 LV	±4.5%
	July 14	35%	58%	23	500 LV	±4.5%
TargetPoint (R)	June 27 – July 1	36%	49%	13	3004 RV	Not reported
Rasmussen Reports/Pulse Opinion Research	June 11	37%	47%	10	500 LV	±4.5%
Cooper & Secrest Associates (D)	June 5–8	41%	45%	4	808 LV	±3.5%
KCTV-TV Kansas City/KWCH-TV Wichita/SurveyUSA	May 16–18	39%	49%	10	600 RV	±4.1%
Rasmussen Reports/Pulse Opinion Research	May 13	34%	55%	21	500 LV	±4.5%
KCTV-TV Kansas City/KWCH-TV Wichita/SurveyUSA	April 11–13	37%	54%	17	516 RV	±4.4%
SurveyUSA	February 26–28	41%	50%	9	598 RV	±4.1%
KCTV-TV Kansas City/KWCH-TV Wichita/SurveyUSA	February 15–17	44%	50%	6	514 RV	±4.4%
KCTV-TV Kansas City/KWCH-TV Wichita/SurveyUSA	December 13–15, 2007	36%	56%	20	529 RV	±4.3%

=== Kentucky ===
8 electoral votes
(Republican in 2000 & 2004)

Poll Source	Date administered (2008)	Barack Obama	John McCain	Margin	Sample size	Margin of error
WHAS-TV Louisville/WLEX-TV Lexington/SurveyUSA	October 29 – November 1	40%	56%	16	616 LV	±4%
Polimetrix/YouGov	October 18 – November 1	41%	53%	12	489 RV	Not reported
Rasmussen Reports/Pulse Opinion Research	October 29	43%	55%	12	500 LV	±4.5%
Louisville Courier-Journal/Mason-Dixon Polling & Research	October 27–29	42%	51%	9	817 LV	Not reported
Rasmussen Reports/Pulse Opinion Research	October 21	44%	52%	8	500 LV	±4.5%
WHAS-TV Louisville/WLEX-TV Lexington/SurveyUSA	October 16–18	41%	54%	13	535 LV	±4.3%
Rasmussen Reports/Pulse Opinion Research	September 30	42%	52%	10	500 LV	±4.5%
Louisville Courier-Journal/Mason-Dixon Polling & Research	September 22–25	41%	53%	12	717 LV	Not reported
WCPO-Cincinnati/WHAS-TV Louisville/WLEX-TV Lexington/SurveyUSA	September 21–22	38%	57%	19	672 LV	±3.8%
American Research Group	September 8–12	37%	57%	20	600 LV	±4%
WCPO-Cincinnati/WHAS-TV Louisville/WLEX-TV Lexington/SurveyUSA	August 9–11	37%	55%	18	636 LV	±3.9%
Rasmussen Reports/Pulse Opinion Research	July 29	43%	52%	9	500 LV	±4.5%
	June 25	35%	51%	16	500 LV	±4.5%
WCPO-Cincinnati/WHAS-TV Louisville/WLEX-TV Lexington/SurveyUSA	June 13–16	41%	53%	12	626 LV	±4%
Rasmussen Reports/Pulse Opinion Research	May 22	32%	57%	25	500 LV	±4.5%
WCPO-Cincinnati/WHAS-TV Louisville/SurveyUSA	April 11–13	29%	63%	34	538 RV	±4.2%
WCPO-Cincinnati/WHAS-TV Louisville/SurveyUSA	March 14–16	28%	64%	36	535 RV	±4.1%
SurveyUSA	February 26–28	33%	54%	21	605 RV	±4.1%
WCPO-Cincinnati/WHAS-TV Louisville/SurveyUSA	December 13–15, 2007	35%	53%	18	534 RV	±4.3%
WCPO-Cincinnati/WHAS-TV Louisville/SurveyUSA	November 9–11, 2007	34%	56%	22	560 RV	±4.2%
WCPO-Cincinnati/WHAS-TV Louisville/SurveyUSA	February 12–14, 2007	39%	54%	15	504 RV	±4.4%

Four-way race

Poll Source	Date administered (2008)	Barack Obama	John McCain	Bob Barr	Ralph Nader	Sample size	Margin of error
Zogby Interactive	June 11–30	39%	44%	3%	1%	529 LV	±4.3%

=== Louisiana ===
9 electoral votes
(Republican in 2000 & 2004)

Poll Source	Date administered (2008)	Barack Obama	John McCain	Margin	Sample size	Margin of error
Polimetrix/YouGov	October 18 – November 1	45%	52%	7	436 RV	Not reported
WAFB 9News/Loyola University	October 24–26	40%	43%	3	475 RV	±4.5%
Southeastern Louisiana University	October 20–23	38.3%	50.6%	12.3	503 RV	±4.46%
Rasmussen Reports/Pulse Opinion Research	October 21	41%	57%	16	500 LV	±4.5%
Rasmussen Reports/Pulse Opinion Research	September 25	40%	55%	15	500 LV	±4.5%
American Research Group	September 9–12	43%	50%	7	600 LV	±4%
Rasmussen Reports/Pulse Opinion Research	August 17	39%	57%	18	500 LV	±4.5%
Rasmussen Reports/Pulse Opinion Research	July 9	37%	56%	19	500 LV	±4.5%
Southern Media & Opinion Research	June 26–28	35.5%	52.2%	16.7	600 LV	±4%
Rasmussen Reports/Pulse Opinion Research	May 28	41%	50%	9	500 LV	±4.5%
Southern Media & Opinion Research	March 26 – April 9	35%	51%	16	600 LV	±4%
SurveyUSA	February 26–28	39%	54%	15	599 RV	±4.1%

Four-way race

Poll Source	Date administered (2008)	Barack Obama	John McCain	Bob Barr	Ralph Nader	Margin	Sample size	Margin of error
Zogby Interactive	June 11–30	40%	47%	4%	1%	7	431 LV	±4.8%

=== Maine ===
4 electoral votes
(Democrat in 2000 & 2004)

Poll Source	Date administered (2008)	Barack Obama	John McCain	Margin	Sample size	Margin of error
Rasmussen Reports/Pulse Opinion Research	November 1	56%	43%	13	500 LV	±4.5%
Polimetrix/YouGov	October 18 – November 1	51%	42%	9	486 RV	Not reported
WCSH-TV Portland/WLBZ-TV Bangor/SurveyUSA	October 29–31	58%	38%	20	674 LV	±3.8%
Market Decisions	October 13–26	52%	33%	19	425 A	±4.8%
WCSH-TV Portland/WLBZ-TV Bangor/SurveyUSA	October 19–20	54%	39%	15	642 LV	±3.9%
Critical Insights	October 16–19	56%	35%	21	443 LV	±4.7%
Pan Atlantic SMS Group	October 13–16	51.3%	38.5%	12.8	400 LV	±4.9%
Rasmussen Reports/Pulse Opinion Research	October 2	51%	46%	5	500 LV	±4.5%
WCSH-TV Portland/WLBZ-TV Bangor/SurveyUSA	September 22–23	49%	44%	5	675 LV	±3.8%
Rasmussen Reports/Pulse Opinion Research	September 17	50%	46%	4	500 LV	±4.5%
American Research Group	September 8–10	51%	41%	10	600 LV	±4%
Rasmussen Reports/Pulse Opinion Research	August 12	53%	39%	14	500 LV	±4.5%
	July 17	49%	41%	8	500 LV	±4.5%
Critical Insights	June 1–27	51%	31%	20	498 LV	±4.5%
Pan Atlantic SMS Group	June 10–18	46.1%	32.1%	14	400 LV	±4.9%
Rasmussen Reports/Pulse Opinion Research	June 16	55%	33%	22	500 LV	±4.5%
Rasmussen Reports/Pulse Opinion Research	May 14	51%	38%	13	500 LV	±4.5%
Rasmussen Reports/Pulse Opinion Research	April 1	49%	39%	10	500 LV	±4.5%
SurveyUSA	February 26–28	53%	39%	14	639 RV	±3.9%

First congressional district

Poll Source	Date administered (2008)	Barack Obama	John McCain	Margin	Sample size	Margin of error
SurveyUSA	October 29–31	60%	37%	23	Not reported	Not reported
Critical Insights	October 16–19	56%	33%	23	228 LV	Not reported
Pan Atlantic SMS Group	October 13–16	49.8%	37.2%	12.6	207 LV	±6.81%

Second congressional district

Poll Source	Date administered (2008)	Barack Obama	John McCain	Margin	Sample size	Margin of error
SurveyUSA	October 29–31	55%	39%	16	Not reported	Not reported
Critical Insights	October 16–19	56%	36%	20	215 LV	Not reported
Pan Atlantic SMS Group	October 13–16	52.8%	39.9%	12.9	193 LV	±7.05%

=== Maryland ===
10 electoral votes
(Democrat in 2000 & 2004)

Poll Source	Date administered (2008)	Barack Obama	John McCain	Margin	Sample size	Margin of error
Polimetrix/YouGov	October 18 – November 1	60%	35%	25	475 RV	Not reported
Rasmussen Reports/Pulse Opinion Research	September 20	60%	37%	23	500 LV	±4.5%
American Research Group	September 17–19	54%	39%	15	600 LV	±4%
Gonzales Research & Marketing Strategies Inc.	August 29 – September 5	52%	38%	14	833 LV	±3.5%
Rasmussen Reports/Pulse Opinion Research	August 18	53%	43%	10	500 LV	±4.5%
Gonzales Research & Marketing Strategies Inc.	February 23 – March 1	51%	37%	14	807 RV	±3.5%
SurveyUSA	February 26–28	53%	40%	13	620 RV	±4%
Rasmussen Reports/Pulse Opinion Research	January 2	48%	42%	6	500 LV	±4.5%

Four-way race

Poll Source	Date administered (2008)	Barack Obama	John McCain	Bob Barr	Ralph Nader	Margin	Sample size	Margin of error
Zogby Interactive	June 11–30	54%	30%	6%	1%	24	924 LV	±3.3%

=== Massachusetts ===
12 electoral votes
(Democrat in 2000 & 2004)

Poll Source	Date administered (2008)	Barack Obama	John McCain	Margin	Sample size	Margin of error
Polimetrix/YouGov	October 18 – November 1	57%	39%	18	705 RV	Not reported
WBZ-TV Boston/SurveyUSA	October 27–28	56%	39%	17	658 LV	±3.9%
WBZ-TV Boston/SurveyUSA	October 13–14	59%	35%	24	624 LV	±3.9%
Rasmussen Reports/Pulse Opinion Research	October 13	62%	34%	28	500 LV	±4.5%
WBZ-TV Boston/SurveyUSA	September 22–23	55%	39%	16	679 LV	±3.8%
American Research Group	September 20–22	55%	39%	16	500 LV	±4%
Rasmussen Reports/Pulse Opinion Research	August 5	54%	38%	16	500 LV	±4.5%
	June 30	53%	33%	20	500 LV	±4.5%
WBZ-TV Boston/SurveyUSA	June 25–27	53%	40%	13	607 LV	±4.1%
Rasmussen Reports/Pulse Opinion Research	May 29	51%	38%	13	500 LV	±4.5%
WBZ-TV Boston/SurveyUSA	May 16–18	46%	41%	5	600 RV	±4.1%
Rasmussen Reports/Pulse Opinion Research	April 23	51%	39%	12	500 LV	±4.5%
WBZ-TV Boston/SurveyUSA	April 11–13	48%	46%	2	546 RV	±4.3%
Rasmussen Reports/Pulse Opinion Research	March 18	49%	42%	7	500 LV	±4.5%
WBZ-TV Boston/SurveyUSA	March 14–16	47%	47%	Tied	510 RV	±4.4%
SurveyUSA	February 26–28	49%	42%	7	636 RV	±4%
WBZ-TV Boston/SurveyUSA	January 20–21	45%	50%	5	562 RV	±4.2%
WBZ-TV Boston/SurveyUSA	December 13–15, 2007	47%	45%	2	542 RV	±4.3%
WBZ-TV Boston/SurveyUSA	November 9–11, 2007	44%	47%	3	540 RV	±4.3%
WBZ-TV Boston/WNYT-TV Albany/SurveyUSA	January 12–14, 2007	43%	46%	3	525 RV	±4.4%

Three-way race

Poll Source	Date administered (2008)	Barack Obama	John McCain	Ralph Nader	Margin	Sample size	Margin of error
7News/Suffolk University	June 8–10	53%	30%	3%	23	500 LV	±4.40%

Four-way race

Poll Source	Date administered (2008)	Barack Obama	John McCain	Bob Barr	Ralph Nader	Cynthia McKinney	Margin	Sample size	Margin of error
7News/Suffolk University	July 31 – August 3	47%	38%	1%	N/A	1%	9	400 LV	±4.90%
Zogby Interactive	June 11–30	54%	29%	5%	3%	N/A	25	861 LV	±3.4%

Six-way race

Poll Source	Date administered (2008)	Barack Obama	John McCain	Bob Barr	Ralph Nader	Cynthia McKinney	Chuck Baldwin	Margin	Sample size	Margin of error
7News/Suffolk University	October 20–22	53%	34%	1%	3%	1%	1%	19	400 LV	±4.90%

=== Michigan ===
17 electoral votes
(Democrat in 2000 & 2004)

Poll Source	Date administered (2008)	Barack Obama	John McCain	Margin	Sample size	Margin of error
Mitchell Research & Communications Inc.	November 3	54%	38%	16	400 LV	±5%
Polimetrix/YouGov	October 18 – November 1	55%	42%	13	973 RV	Not reported
Detroit Free Press-Local 4/Selzer & Co.	October 28–31	53%	37%	16	616 LV	±4%
Public Policy Polling	October 28–30	55%	42%	13	1,532 LV	±2.5%
Mitchell Research & Communications Inc.	October 26–30	54%	40%	14	600 LV	±4%
Rasmussen Reports/Pulse Opinion Research	October 28	53%	43%	10	500 LV	±4.5%
Detroit News/EPIC-MRA	October 26–28	50%	38%	12	400 LV	±4.9%
Big Ten	October 19–22	58.1%	35.8%	22.3	562 LV	±4.2%
Washington Post/Wall Street Journal/Quinnipiac University	October 8–12	54%	38%	16	1,043 LV	±3%
Rasmussen Reports/Pulse Opinion Research	October 8	56%	40%	16	500 LV	±4.5%
MIRS/Denno-Noor Research/The Rossman Group	October 1–4	44%	39%	5	600 RV	±4%
Public Policy Polling	September 29 – October 1	51%	41%	10	731 LV	±3.6%
Detroit Free Press-Local 4/Selzer & Co.	September 22–24	51%	38%	13	602 LV	±4%
CNN/Time/Opinion Research Corporation	September 21–23	51%	46%	5	755 LV	±3.5%
NBC News/Mason-Dixon Polling & Research	September 18–23	46%	46%	Tied	625 LV	±4%
Allstate/National Journal/Financial Dynamics	September 18–22	47%	39%	8	406 RV	±4.9%
Washington Post/Wall Street Journal/Quinnipiac University	September 14–21	48%	44%	4	1,346 LV	±2.7%
Inside Michigan Politics/Marketing Resource Group	September 15–20	43%	46%	3	600 LV	±4.1%
American Research Group	September 16–19	48%	46%	2	600 LV	±4%
Marist College	September 16–17	52%	43%	9	599 LV	±4%
Big Ten	September 14–17	47.8%	43.8%	4	600 RV	±4%
Michigan State University	July 20 – September 14	45%	33.3%	11.7	1,010 A	±3.1%
Zogby Interactive	September 9–12	49%	43.3%	5.7	742 LV	±3.7%
Poll Position/InsiderAdvantage	September 10	44%	45%	1	503 LV	±4.3%
Rasmussen Reports/Pulse Opinion Research	September 10	51%	46%	5	500 LV	±4.5%
CNN/Time/Opinion Research Corporation	September 7–9	49%	45%	4	966 RV	±3%
Public Policy Polling	September 6–7	47%	46%	1	1,147 LV	±2.9%
Detroit Free Press-Local 4/WDIV/Selzer & Co.	August 17–20	46%	39%	7	600 LV	±4%
Rasmussen Reports/Pulse Opinion Research	August 7	49%	45%	4	500 LV	±4.5%
Public Policy Polling	July 23–27	46%	43%	3	883 LV	±3.3%
Washington Post/Wall Street Journal/Quinnipiac University	July 14–22	46%	42%	4	1,684 LV	±2.4%
Democracy Corps/Greenberg Quinlan Rosner (D)	July 14–21	48%	43%	5	764 LV	Not reported
Rasmussen Reports/Pulse Opinion Research	July 10	50%	42%	8	500 LV	±4.5%
Washington Post/Wall Street Journal/Quinnipiac University	June 17–24	48%	42%	6	1,411 LV	±2.6%
Public Policy Polling	June 21–22	48%	39%	9	573 LV	±4.1%
Rasmussen Reports/Pulse Opinion Research	June 9	45%	42%	3	500 LV	±4.5%
SurveyUSA	May 27	37%	41%	4	529 RV	±4.3%
Detroit News/EPIC-MRA	May 19–22	40%	44%	4	600 LV	±4%
Rasmussen Reports/Pulse Opinion Research	May 7	44%	45%	1	500 LV	±4.5%
Rasmussen Reports/Pulse Opinion Research	March 25	42%	43%	1	500 LV	±4.5%
Rasmussen Reports/Pulse Opinion Research	March 10	41%	44%	3	500 LV	±4.5%
SurveyUSA	February 26–28	46%	45%	1	643 RV	±3.9%
Rasmussen Reports/Pulse Opinion Research	February 17	47%	39%	8	500 LV	±4.5%
Detroit Free Press-Local 4/Selzer & Co.	December 10–12, 2007	49%	41%	8	Not reported	Not reported
EPIC-MRA	January 31 – February 4, 2007	43%	53%	10	600 LV	±4%
Detroit Free Press-Local 4/Selzer & Co.	January 28–31, 2007	44%	39%	5	Not reported	±3.8%

Three-way race

Poll Source	Date administered (2008)	Barack Obama	John McCain	Ralph Nader	Margin	Sample size	Margin of error
EPIC-MRA	April 3–8	43%	41%	8%	2	600 LV	±4%

Four-way race

Poll Source	Date administered (2008)	Barack Obama	John McCain	Bob Barr	Ralph Nader	Margin	Sample size	Margin of error
Detroit News/EPIC-MRA	October 19–20	51%	37%	1%	1%	14	400 LV	±4.9%
Detroit News/EPIC-MRA	September 20–22	48%	38%	1%	2%	10	400 LV	±4.9%
Detroit News/EPIC-MRA	September 14–17	43%	42%	2%	2%	1	602 LV	±4%
Detroit News/EPIC-MRA	August 18–21	43%	41%	1%	3%	2	600 LV	±4%
Zogby Interactive	August 15–19	46%	37%	5%	1%	9	609 LV	±4.0%
Democracy Corps/Greenberg Quinlan Rosner (D)	July 14–21	46%	39%	3%	6%	7	764 LV	Not reported
Detroit News/EPIC-MRA	July 13–16	43%	41%	2%	3%	2	600 LV	±4%
Zogby Interactive	June 11–30	47%	33%	6%	2%	14	1,349 LV	±2.9%

Five-way race

Poll Source	Date administered (2008)	Barack Obama	John McCain	Bob Barr	Ralph Nader	Cynthia McKinney	Margin	Sample size	Margin of error
Fox News/Rasmussen Reports/Pulse Opinion Research	September 21	51%	44%	1%	1%	0%	7	500 LV	±4.5%

=== Minnesota ===
10 electoral votes
(Democrat in 2000 & 2004)

Poll Source	Date administered (2008)	Barack Obama	John McCain	Margin	Sample size	Margin of error
KAAL-TV Rochester-Mason City-Austin/KSTP-TV Minneapolis/WDIO-TV Duluth/SurveyUSA	October 30 – November 1	49%	46%	3	669 LV	±3.9%
Polimetrix/YouGov	October 18 – November 1	51%	45%	6	699 RV	Not reported
Minnesota Star Tribune/Princeton Survey Research Associates International	October 28–31	53%	42%	11	933 LV	±4.1%
Public Policy Polling	October 28–30	57%	41%	16	1,050 LV	±3%
Rasmussen Reports/Pulse Opinion Research	October 28	55%	43%	12	500 LV	±4.5%
NBC News/Mason-Dixon Polling & Research	October 27–28	48%	40%	8	625 LV	±4%
Minnesota Public Radio/Humphrey Institute	October 24–28	56%	37%	19	451 LV	±4.6%
Rasmussen Reports/Pulse Opinion Research	October 22	56%	41%	15	500 LV	±4.5%
Big Ten	October 19–22	57.3%	37.9%	19.4	583 LV	±4.2%
St. Cloud State University	October 14–22	42%	37%	5	509 A	±4.6%
Allstate/National Journal/Financial Dynamics	October 16–20	50%	40%	10	402 RV	±4.9%
KAAL-TV Rochester-Mason City-Austin/KSTP-TV Minneapolis/WDIO-TV Duluth/SurveyUSA	October 16–18	50%	44%	6	655 LV	±3.9%
Minnesota Star Tribune/Princeton Survey Research Associates International	October 16–17	52%	41%	11	1,049 LV	±3.8%
Washington Post/Wall Street Journal/Quinnipiac University	October 8–12	51%	40%	11	1,043 LV	±3%
Rasmussen Reports/Pulse Opinion Research	October 7	52%	45%	7	500 LV	±4.5%
American Research Group	October 4–7	47%	46%	1	600 LV	±4%
Minnesota Public Radio/Humphrey Institute	October 3–5	54%	40%	14	418 LV	±4.8%
Minnesota Star Tribune/Princeton Survey Research Associates International	September 30 – October 2	55%	37%	18	1,084 LV	±3.7%
KAAL-TV Rochester-Mason City-Austin/KSAX-TV Alexandria/KSTP-TV Minneapolis/WDIO-TV Duluth/SurveyUSA	September 30 – October 1	46%	47%	1	725 LV	±3.7%
CNN/Time/Opinion Research Corporation	September 28–30	54%	43%	11	849 LV	±3.5%
Washington Post/Wall Street Journal/Quinnipiac University	September 14–21	47%	45%	2	1,301 LV	±2.7%
American Research Group	September 18–20	48%	47%	1	600 LV	±4%
Rasmussen Reports/Pulse Opinion Research	September 18	52%	44%	8	500 LV	±4.5%
Big Ten	September 14–17	47.3%	44.5%	2.8	610 RV	±4%
Minnesota Star Tribune/Princeton Survey Research Associates International	September 10–12	45%	45%	Tied	1,106 LV	±3.9%
KAAL-TV Rochester-Mason City-Austin/KSAX-TV Alexandria/KSTP-TV Minneapolis/WDIO-TV Duluth/SurveyUSA	September 10–11	49%	47%	2	734 LV	±3.4%
CNN/Time/Opinion Research Corporation	August 31 – September 2	53%	41%	12	742 RV	±3.5%
KSTP-TV Minneapolis/SurveyUSA	August 13–14	47%	45%	2	682 LV	±3.8%
Rasmussen Reports/Pulse Opinion Research	August 13	49%	45%	4	700 LV	±4.5%
	July 22	53%	39%	13	500 LV	±4.5%
Washington Post/Wall Street Journal/Quinnipiac University	July 14–22	46%	44%	2	1,261 LV	±2.8%
Rasmussen Reports/Pulse Opinion Research	July 10	54%	37%	17	500 LV	±4.5%
Washington Post/Wall Street Journal/Quinnipiac University	June 17–24	54%	37%	17	1,572 LV	±2.5%
KAAL-TV Rochester-Mason City-Austin/KSTP-TV Minneapolis/WDIO-TV Duluth/SurveyUSA	June 13–16	47%	46%	1	543 LV	±4.3%
Rasmussen Reports/Pulse Opinion Research	June 11	52%	39%	13	500 LV	±4.5%
Rasmussen Reports/Pulse Opinion Research	May 22	53%	38%	15	500 LV	±4%
KAAL-TV Rochester-Mason City-Austin/KSTP-TV Minneapolis/WDIO-TV Duluth/SurveyUSA	May 16–18	47%	42%	5	600 RV	±4.1%
Minnesota Star Tribune/Princeton Survey Research Associates International	May 12–15	51%	38%	13	1,117 RV	±3.6%
Rasmussen Reports/Pulse Opinion Research	April 22	52%	38%	14	500 LV	±4%
KAAL-TV Rochester-Mason City-Austin/KSTP-TV Minneapolis/WDIO-TV Duluth/SurveyUSA	April 11–13	49%	43%	6	535 RV	±4.3%
Rasmussen Reports/Pulse Opinion Research	March 19	47%	43%	4	500 LV	±4.5%
KAAL-TV Rochester-Mason City-Austin/KSTP-TV Minneapolis/WDIO-TV Duluth/SurveyUSA	March 14–16	46%	47%	1	532 RV	±4.3%
SurveyUSA	February 26–28	49%	42%	7	608 RV	±4.1%
Rasmussen Reports/Pulse Opinion Research	February 16	53%	38%	15	500 LV	±4.5%
Minnesota Public Radio/Humphrey Institute	January 20–27	50%	37%	13	917 A	±3.2%
KAAL-TV Rochester-Mason City-Austin/KSTP-TV Minneapolis/WDIO-TV Duluth/SurveyUSA	January 20–21	42%	49%	7	550 RV	±4.3%
KAAL-TV Rochester-Mason City-Austin/KSTP-TV Minneapolis/WDIO-TV Duluth/SurveyUSA	December 13–15, 2007	41%	50%	9	556 RV	±4.2%
KAAL-TV Rochester-Mason City-Austin/KSTP-TV Minneapolis/WDIO-TV Duluth/SurveyUSA	November 9–11, 2007	43%	46%	4	535 RV	±4.3%
SurveyUSA	March 9–11, 2007	42%	47%	5	Not reported	Not reported
KSTP-TV Minneapolis/SurveyUSA	February 12–13, 2007	43%	49%	6	632 RV	±3.9%
KAAL-TV Rochester-Mason City-Austin/KSTP-TV Minneapolis/WDIO-TV Duluth/SurveyUSA	January 12–14, 2007	41%	48%	7	511 RV	±4.4%

Four-way race

Poll Source	Date administered (2008)	Barack Obama	John McCain	Bob Barr	Ralph Nader	Margin	Sample size	Margin of error
Minnesota Public Radio/Humphrey Institute	August 7–17	48%	38%	1%	3%	10	763 LV	±3.6%
Zogby Interactive	June 11–30	48%	32%	8%	<1%	16	830 LV	±3.5%

=== Mississippi ===
6 electoral votes
(Republican in 2000 & 2004)

Poll Source	Date administered (2008)	Barack Obama	John McCain	Margin	Sample size	Margin of error
Polimetrix/YouGov	October 18 – November 1	42%	55%	13	417 RV	Not reported
Rasmussen Reports/Pulse Opinion Research	October 27	45%	53%	8	500 LV	±4.5%
Press-Register/USA Polling Group/University of South Alabama	October 13–23	33%	46%	13	405 LV	±5%
Rasmussen Reports/Pulse Opinion Research	September 30	44%	52%	8	500 LV	±4.5%
American Research Group	September 13–16	39%	55%	16	600 LV	±4%
Rasmussen Reports/Pulse Opinion Research	August 21	43%	56%	13	500 LV	±4.5%
Rasmussen Reports/Pulse Opinion Research	July 28	42%	54%	12	500 LV	±4%
Rasmussen Reports/Pulse Opinion Research	June 24	44%	50%	6	500 LV	±4%
	May 27	44%	50%	6	500 LV	±4%
SurveyUSA	February 26–28	41%	54%	13	622 RV	±4%

=== Missouri ===
11 electoral votes
(Republican in 2000 & 2004)

Poll Source	Date administered (2008)	Barack Obama	John McCain	Margin	Sample size	Margin of error
Reuters/Zogby International	October 31 – November 3	48.8%	48.8%	Tied	600 LV	±4.1%
Public Policy Polling	October 31 – November 2	49.4%	48.6%	0.8	1,343 LV	±2.7%
KCTV-TV Saint Louis/KMOX 1120 Radio St. Louis/SurveyUSA	October 30 – November 2	48%	48%	Tied	674 LV	±3.9%
Polimetrix/YouGov	October 18 – November 1	47%	49%	2	684 RV	Not reported
NBC News/Mason-Dixon Polling & Research	October 29–30	46%	47%	1	625 LV	±4%
American Research Group	October 28–30	48%	48%	Tied	600 LV	±4%
Politico/InsiderAdvantage	October 29	47%	50%	3	814 LV	±3.4%
CNN/Time/Opinion Research Corporation	October 23–28	48%	50%	2	774 LV	±3.5%
KCTV-TV Saint Louis/KMOX 1120 Radio St. Louis/SurveyUSA	October 25–26	48%	48%	Tied	672 LV	±3.9%
Reuters/Zogby International	October 23–26	48.2%	45.7%	2.5	600 LV	±4.1%
NBC News/Mason-Dixon Polling & Research	October 22–23	45%	46%	1	625 LV	±4%
Zogby Interactive	October 17–20	48%	48.3%	0.3	717 LV	±3.7%
Rasmussen Reports/Pulse Opinion Research	October 15	52%	46%	6	700 LV	±4%
CNN/Time/Opinion Research Corporation	October 11–14	48%	49%	1	763 LV	±3.5%
KCTV-TV Saint Louis/KMOX 1120 Radio St. Louis/SurveyUSA	October 11–12	51%	43%	8	546 LV	±4.3%
Public Policy Polling	October 11–12	48%	46%	2	1,009 LV	±3.1%
American Research Group	October 4–6	46%	49%	3	600 LV	±4%
CNN/Time/Opinion Research Corporation	September 28–30	49%	48%	1	744 LV	±3.5%
KCTV-TV Kansas City/SurveyUSA	September 23–24	46%	48%	2	705 LV	±3.8%
American Research Group	September 11–15	45%	50%	5	600 LV	±4%
Zogby Interactive	September 9–12	42.4%	48.5%	6.1	604 LV	±4.1%
Rasmussen Reports/Pulse Opinion Research	September 11	46%	51%	5	700 LV	±4%
CNN/Time/Opinion Research Corporation	September 7–9	45%	50%	5	940 RV	±3%
Public Policy Polling	August 13–17	40%	50%	10	750 LV	±3.6%
Rasmussen Reports/Pulse Opinion Research	August 7	44%	50%	6	500 LV	±4.5%
KCTV-TV Kansas City/KSDK-TV Saint Louis/SurveyUSA	July 29–31	44%	49%	5	1,459 LV	±2.6%
Rasmussen Reports/Pulse Opinion Research	July 7	45%	50%	5	500 LV	±4.5%
Public Policy Polling	July 2–5	44%	47%	3	723 LV	±3.6%
KCTV-TV Kansas City/KSDK-TV Saint Louis/SurveyUSA	June 20–22	43%	50%	7	543 LV	±4.3%
Rasmussen Reports/Pulse Opinion Research	June 3	43%	42%	1	500 LV	±4%
KCTV-TV Kansas City/KSDK-TV Saint Louis/SurveyUSA	May 16–18	45%	48%	3	1,523 LV	±2.6%
Rasmussen Reports/Pulse Opinion Research	May 6	41%	47%	6	500 LV	±4%
KCTV-TV Kansas City/SurveyUSA	April 11–13	42%	50%	8	542 RV	±4.3%
Rasmussen Reports/Pulse Opinion Research	March 24	38%	53%	15	500 LV	±4.5%
KCTV-TV Kansas City/SurveyUSA	March 14–16	39%	53%	14	536 RV	±4.3%
SurveyUSA	February 26–28	42%	48%	6	632 RV	±4%
KCTV-TV Kansas City/SurveyUSA	February 15–17	49%	43%	6	544 RV	±4.3%
Rasmussen Reports/Pulse Opinion Research	February 12	40%	42%	2	500 LV	±4.5%
KCTV-TV Kansas City/SurveyUSA	January 11–13	40%	51%	11	562 RV	±4.2%
KCTV-TV Kansas City/SurveyUSA	December 13–15, 2007	47%	44%	3	547 RV	±4.3%
KCTV-TV Kansas City/SurveyUSA	November 9–11, 2007	46%	45%	1	543 RV	±4.3%
SurveyUSA	March 9–11, 2007	46%	43%	3	Not reported	Not reported
SurveyUSA	February 9–11, 2007	45%	48%	3	Not reported	Not reported
SurveyUSA	January 12–14, 2007	45%	47%	2	515 RV	±4.4%

Four-way race

Poll Source	Date administered (2008)	Barack Obama	John McCain	Bob Barr	Ralph Nader	Margin	Sample size	Margin of error
Zogby Interactive	June 11–30	42%	40%	6%	1%	2	1,121 LV	±3.0%

Five-way race

Poll Source	Date administered (2008)	Barack Obama	John McCain	Bob Barr	Ralph Nader	Cynthia McKinney	Margin	Sample size	Margin of error
Fox News/Rasmussen Reports/Pulse Opinion Research	November 2	49%	49%	0%	0%	0%	Tied	1,000 LV	±3%
Fox News/Rasmussen Reports/Pulse Opinion Research	October 26	48%	47%	1%	2%	0%	1	1,000 LV	±3%
Fox News/Rasmussen Reports/Pulse Opinion Research	October 19	49%	44%	1%	2%	1%	5	1,000 LV	±3%
Fox News/Rasmussen Reports/Pulse Opinion Research	October 12	50%	47%	0%	1%	0%	3	1,000 LV	±3%
Fox News/Rasmussen Reports/Pulse Opinion Research	October 5	50%	47%	1%	1%	0%	3	1,000 LV	±3%

Six-way race

Poll Source	Date administered (2008)	Barack Obama	John McCain	Bob Barr	Ralph Nader	Cynthia McKinney	Chuck Baldwin	Margin	Sample size	Margin of error
Suffolk University	October 17–19	44%	45%	0%	1%	0%	0%	1	600 LV	±4%

=== Montana ===
3 electoral votes
(Republican in 2000 & 2004)

Poll Source	Date administered (2008)	Barack Obama	John McCain	Margin	Sample size	Margin of error
Polimetrix/YouGov	October 18 – November 1	44%	54%	10	368 RV	Not reported
American Research Group	October 28–30	46%	49%	3	600 LV	±4%
Rasmussen Reports/Pulse Opinion Research	October 29	46%	50%	4	500 LV	±4.5%
NBC News/Mason-Dixon Polling & Research	October 23–25	44%	48%	4	625 LV	±4%
American Research Group	October 6–8	45%	50%	5	600 LV	±4%
Rasmussen Reports/Pulse Opinion Research	October 1	44%	52%	8	500 LV	±4.5%
CNN/Time/Opinion Research Corporation	September 21–23	43%	54%	11	737 LV	±3.5%
American Research Group	September 7–9	47%	49%	2	600 LV	±4%
Rasmussen Reports/Pulse Opinion Research	September 8	42%	53%	11	700 LV	±4%
Rasmussen Reports/Pulse Opinion Research	July 29	47%	47%	Tied	500 LV	±4.5%
	July 1	48%	43%	5	500 LV	±4.5%
Lee Newspapers/Mason-Dixon Polling & Research	May 19–21	39%	47%	8	625 LV	±4%
Rasmussen Reports/Pulse Opinion Research	April 6	43%	48%	5	500 LV	±4.5%
SurveyUSA	February 26–28	39%	47%	8	640 RV	±4%

Three-way race

Poll Source	Date administered (2008)	Barack Obama	John McCain	Ron Paul‡	Margin	Sample size	Margin of error
Public Policy Polling	October 31 – November 2	48%	47%	4%	1	2,734 LV	±1.9%

Five-way race

Poll Source	Date administered (2008)	Barack Obama	John McCain	Ron Paul	Bob Barr	Ralph Nader	Margin	Sample size	Margin of error
Montana State University Billings	October 16–20	44.4%	40.2%	4.2%	1%	0.7%	4.2%	403 LV	±5%

‡ Ron Paul replaced Chuck Baldwin on the ballot in Montana.

=== Nebraska ===
5 electoral votes
(Republican in 2000 & 2004)

Poll Source	Date administered (2008)	Barack Obama	John McCain	Margin	Sample size	Margin of error
Polimetrix/YouGov	October 18 – November 1	38%	57%	19	407 RV	Not reported
Rasmussen Reports/Pulse Opinion Research	September 30	37%	56%	19	500 LV	±4.5%
American Research Group	September 12–17	34%	60%	26	600 LV	±4%
Rasmussen Reports/Pulse Opinion Research	July 28	36%	55%	19	500 LV	±4.5%
Rasmussen Reports/Pulse Opinion Research	June 23	36%	52%	16	500 LV	±4.5%
SurveyUSA	May 16–18	40%	49%	9	600 RV	±4.1%
Rasmussen Reports/Pulse Opinion Research	May 15	39%	50%	11	500 LV	±4.5%
SurveyUSA	February 26–28	42%	45%	3	623 RV	±4%

Second congressional district

Poll Source	Date administered (2008)	Barack Obama	John McCain	Margin	Sample size	Margin of error
Anzalone Liszt Research	October 13–15	44%	48%	4	400 LV	±4.9%
Anzalone Liszt Research	July 27 – August 2	42%	46%	4	600 LV	±4%

=== Nevada ===
5 electoral votes
(Republican in 2000 & 2004)

Poll Source	Date administered (2008)	Barack Obama	John McCain	Margin	Sample size	Margin of error
American Research Group	October 31 – November 3	51%	46%	5	600 LV	±4%
Reuters/Zogby International	October 31 – November 3	53.2%	42.4%	10.8	600 LV	±4.1%
Public Policy Polling	October 31 – November 2	51%	47%	4	1,243 LV	±2.8%
Polimetrix/YouGov	October 18 – November 1	51%	46%	5	494 RV	Not reported
Las Vegas Review-Journal/Mason-Dixon Polling & Research	October 28–29	47%	43%	4	625 LV	±4%
CNN/Time/Opinion Research Corporation	October 23–28	52%	45%	7	684 LV	±4%
Rasmussen Reports/Pulse Opinion Research	October 27	50%	46%	4	700 LV	±4%
Reuters/Zogby International	October 23–26	48.2%	44%	4.2	601 LV	±4.1%
Associated Press/Roper/GfK Group	October 22–26	52%	41%	11	628 LV	±3.9%
CNN/Time/Opinion Research Corporation	October 19–21	51%	46%	5	700 LV	±3.5%
Zogby Interactive	October 17–20	44%	51.5%	7.5	670 LV	±3.9%
Politico/InsiderAdvantage	October 19	47%	47%	Tied	690 LV	±3.6%
Rasmussen Reports/Pulse Opinion Research	October 16	50%	45%	5	700 LV	±4%
Poll Position/InsiderAdvantage	October 13	49%	46%	3	506 LV	±4%
Zogby Interactive	October 9–13	47.5%	47.1%	0.4	656 LV	±3.9%
Las Vegas Review-Journal/Mason-Dixon Polling & Research	October 8–9	47%	45%	2	625 LV	±4%
Poll Position/InsiderAdvantage	October 6	49%	47%	2	468 LV	±5%
Rasmussen Reports/Pulse Opinion Research	October 2	51%	47%	4	700 LV	±4%
Poll Position/Insider Advantage	September 30	48%	47%	1	437 LV	±5%
CNN/Time/Opinion Research Corporation	September 28–30	51%	47%	4	684 LV	±3.5%
American Research Group	September 27–29	47%	49%	2	600 LV	±4%
Project New West/Myers Research/Myers Research/Grove Insight (D)	September 14–19	47%	45%	2	600 LV	±4%
American Research Group	September 12–14	46%	49%	3	600 LV	±4%
Zogby Interactive	September 9–12	42.5%	50.1%	7.6	572 LV	±4.2%
Rasmussen Reports/Pulse Opinion Research	September 11	46%	49%	3	700 LV	±4%
Poll Position/InsiderAdvantage	September 10	45%	46%	1	518 LV	±4.2%
CNN/Time/Opinion Research Corporation	August 24–26	49%	44%	5	625 RV	±4%
Las Vegas Review-Journal/Mason-Dixon Polling & Research	August 13–15	39%	46%	7	400 LV	±5%
Rasmussen Reports/Pulse Opinion Research	August 11	45%	48%	3	700 LV	±4.5%
Rasmussen Reports/Pulse Opinion Research	July 16	47%	45%	2	500 LV	±4.5%
	June 18	42%	45%	3	500 LV	±4.5%
Las Vegas Review-Journal/Mason-Dixon Polling & Research	June 9–11	42%	44%	2	625 LV	±4%
Rasmussen Reports/Pulse Opinion Research	May 20	40%	46%	6	500 LV	±4%
Rasmussen Reports/Pulse Opinion Research	April 21	43%	48%	5	500 LV	±4%
Rasmussen Reports/Pulse Opinion Research	March 19	45%	41%	4	500 LV	±4.5%
SurveyUSA	February 26–28	46%	41%	5	611 RV	±4%
Rasmussen Reports/Pulse Opinion Research	February 12	50%	38%	12	500 LV	±4%
Las Vegas Review-Journal/Mason-Dixon Polling & Research	December 3–5, 2007	39%	46%	7	625 LV	±4%

Four-way race

Poll Source	Date administered (2008)	Barack Obama	John McCain	Bob Barr	Ralph Nader	Margin	Sample size	Margin of error
Zogby Interactive	August 15–19	39%	38%	10%	3%	1	506 LV	±4.4%
Zogby Interactive	June 11–30	38%	38%	9%	2%	Tied	584 LV	±4.1%

Five-way race

Poll Source	Date administered (2008)	Barack Obama	John McCain	Bob Barr	Ralph Nader	Cynthia McKinney	Margin	Sample size	Margin of error
Suffolk University	October 26	50%	40%	2%	1%	1%	10	450 LV	±4.6%
Suffolk University	September 17–21	45%	46%	1%	2%	0%	1	600 LV	±4%
CNN/Time/Opinion Research Corporation	August 24–26	41%	41%	5%	6%	3%	Tied	625 RV	±4%

Six-way race

Poll Source	Date administered (2008)	Barack Obama	John McCain	Bob Barr	Ralph Nader	Cynthia McKinney	Chuck Baldwin	Margin	Sample size	Margin of error
Associated Press/Roper/GfK Group	October 22–26	52%	40%	1%	1%	0%	1%	12	628 LV	±3.9%

=== New Hampshire ===
4 electoral votes
(Republican in 2000)
(Democrat in 2004)

Poll Source	Date administered (2008)	Barack Obama	John McCain	Margin	Sample size	Margin of error
WMUR/University of New Hampshire (Daily Tracking)	October 31 – November 2	53%	42%	11	831 LV	±3.4%
Polimetrix/YouGov	October 18 – November 1	54%	40%	14	516 RV	Not reported
Rasmussen Reports/Pulse Opinion Research	October 30	51%	44%	7	700 LV	±4%
WBZ-TV Boston/SurveyUSA	October 29–30	53%	42%	11	682 LV	±3.8%
American Research Group	October 28–30	56%	41%	15	600 LV	±4%
WMUR/University of New Hampshire (Daily Tracking)	October 25–27	58%	33%	25	652 LV	±3.8%
Associated Press/Roper/GfK Group	October 22–26	55%	37%	18	600 LV	±4.0%
NBC News/Mason-Dixon Polling & Research	October 23–25	50%	39%	11	625 LV	±4%
Rasmussen Reports/Pulse Opinion Research	October 23	50%	46%	4	700 LV	±4%
Marist College	October 22–23	50%	45%	5	655 LV	±4%
Boston Globe/University of New Hampshire	October 18–22	54%	39%	15	725 LV	±3.5%
Zogby Interactive	October 17–20	46.5%	46.2%	0.3	466 LV	±4.6%
Zogby Interactive	October 9–13	47.7%	42.6%	5.1	455 LV	±4.7%
American Research Group	October 6–8	52%	43%	9	600 LV	±4%
CNN/Time/Opinion Research Corporation	October 3–6	53%	45%	8	813 LV	±3.5%
WBZ-TV Boston/SurveyUSA	October 4–5	53%	40%	13	647 LV	±3.9%
Rasmussen Reports/Pulse Opinion Research	October 1	52%	43%	10	700 LV	±4%
Saint Anselm College/Schulman, Ronca, & Bucuvalas Inc. (SRBI)	September 25–30	49%	37%	12	835 LV	±3.5%
Rasmussen Reports/Pulse Opinion Research	September 23	47%	49%	2	700 LV	±4%
Allstate/National Journal/Financial Dynamics	September 18–22	44%	43%	1	403 RV	±4.9%
Marist College	September 17–21	51%	45%	6	604 LV	±4%
University of New Hampshire	September 14–21	45%	47%	2	523 LV	±4.3%
American Research Group	September 15–18	45%	48%	3	600 LV	±4%
Zogby Interactive	September 9–12	42.8%	49.1%	6.3	433 LV	±4.8%
CNN/Time/Opinion Research Corporation	September 7–9	51%	45%	6	899 RV	±3%
American Research Group	August 18–20	46%	45%	1	600 LV	±4%
Rasmussen Reports/Pulse Opinion Research	August 18	47%	46%	1	700 LV	±4%
	July 23	49%	45%	4	700 LV	±4%
American Research Group	July 19–21	47%	45%	2	600 LV	±4%
University of New Hampshire	July 11–20	46%	43%	3	475 LV	±4.5%
Rasmussen Reports/Pulse Opinion Research	June 18	50%	39%	11	500 LV	±4.5%
American Research Group	June 13–17	51%	39%	12	600 LV	±4%
Rasmussen Reports/Pulse Opinion Research	May 21	48%	43%	5	500 LV	±4.5%
Dartmouth College	April 30 – May 2	39.3%	41.8%	2.5	401 RV	±5.0%
Rasmussen Reports/Pulse Opinion Research	April 30	41%	51%	10	500 LV	±4.5%
University of New Hampshire	April 25–30	43%	49%	6	456 LV	±4.6%
Rasmussen Reports/Pulse Opinion Research	March 16	43%	46%	3	500 LV	±4.5%
SurveyUSA	February 26–28	46%	44%	2	636 RV	±4%
Rasmussen Reports/Pulse Opinion Research	February 11	49%	36%	13	500 LV	±4.5%
Suffolk University	June 20–24, 2007	39%	44%	5	500 LV	±4.4%
Suffolk University	February 24–28, 2007	42%	42%	Tied	500 LV	±4.4%

Four-way race

Poll Source	Date administered (2008)	Barack Obama	John McCain	Bob Barr	Ralph Nader	Margin	Sample size	Margin of error
Zogby Interactive	August 15–19	38%	42%	11%	1%	4	366 LV	±5.1%
Zogby Interactive	June 11–30	40%	37%	10%	2%	3	436 LV	±4.8%

Five-way race

Poll Source	Date administered (2008)	Barack Obama	John McCain	Bob Barr	Ralph Nader	Cynthia McKinney	George Phillies	Margin	Sample size	Margin of error
Suffolk University	October 27–29	53%	40%	1%	1%	0%	N/A	13	600 LV	±4%
Associated Press/Roper/GfK Group	October 22–26	55%	37%	0%	1%	N/A	0%	18	600 LV	±4.0%
7News/Suffolk University	September 20–24	46%	45%	1%	1%	0%	N/A	1	600 LV	±4%

=== New Jersey ===
15 electoral votes
(Democrat in 2000 & 2004)

Poll Source	Date administered (2008)	Barack Obama	John McCain	Margin	Sample size	Margin of error
Rasmussen Reports/Pulse Opinion Research	November 2	57%	40%	17	500 LV	±4.5%
Polimetrix/YouGov	October 18 – November 1	55%	40%	15	777 RV	Not reported
Gannett/Monmouth University	October 29–31	55%	34%	21	801 LV	±3.5%
WABC-TV New York/WCAU-TV Philadelphia/SurveyUSA	October 29–30	52%	42%	10	632 LV	±4%
Fairleigh Dickinson University (PublicMind)	October 23–29	53%	35%	18	852 LV	±3.5%
Marist College	October 20–21	56%	39%	17	628 LV	±4%
Quinnipiac University	October 16–19	59%	36%	23	1,184 LV	±2.9%
Gannett/Monmouth University	October 15–18	55%	38%	17	723 LV	±3.7%
WABC-TV New York/WCAU-TV Philadelphia/SurveyUSA	October 11–12	55%	40%	15	551 LV	±4.2%
Rasmussen Reports/Pulse Opinion Research	October 7	50%	42%	8	500 LV	±4.5%
Fairleigh Dickinson University (PublicMind)	September 29 – October 5	50%	37%	13	790 LV	±3.5%
WABC-TV New York/WCAU-TV Philadelphia/SurveyUSA	September 27–28	52%	42%	10	611 LV	±4%
American Research Group	September 19–21	51%	42%	9	600 LV	±4%
Rasmussen Reports/Pulse Opinion Research	September 16	55%	42%	13	500 LV	±4.5%
Gannett/Monmouth University	September 11–14	49%	41%	8	589 LV	±4.0%
Quinnipiac University	September 10–14	48%	45%	3	1,187 LV	±2.8%
Marist College	September 5–8	48%	45%	3	584 LV	±4%
Fairleigh Dickinson University (PublicMind)	September 4–7	47%	41%	6	872 LV	±3.5%
Quinnipiac University	August 4–10	51%	41%	10	1,468 LV	±2.6%
Rasmussen Reports/Pulse Opinion Research	August 4	52%	42%	10	500 LV	±4.5%
Gannett/Monmouth University	July 17–21	50%	36%	14	698 LV	±3.7%
Rasmussen Reports/Pulse Opinion Research	July 7	47%	44%	3	500 LV	±4.5%
Fairleigh Dickinson University (PublicMind)	June 17–23	49%	33%	16	702 RV	±4%
Quinnipiac University	June 5–8	45%	39%	6	1,473 LV	±2.6%
Rasmussen Reports/Pulse Opinion Research	June 4	48%	39%	9	500 LV	±4.5%
Gannett/Monmouth University	April 24–28	56%	32%	24	720 RV	±3.7%
Fairleigh Dickinson University (PublicMind)	March 24–30	47%	42%	5	816 RV	±3.5%
Rasmussen Reports/Pulse Opinion Research	March 27	45%	46%	1	500 LV	±4%
SurveyUSA	February 26–28	43%	43%	Tied	627 RV	±4%
Rasmussen Reports/Pulse Opinion Research	February 27	43%	45%	2	500 LV	±4%
Fairleigh Dickinson University (PublicMind)	February 18–24	43%	38%	5	795 RV	±3.5%
Quinnipiac University	February 13–18	46%	39%	7	1,803 RV	±2.3%
Quinnipiac University	September 18–23, 2007	44%	41%	3	1,230 RV	±2.8%
Quinnipiac University	June 26 – July 2	44%	40%	4	1,604 RV	±2.5%
Quinnipiac University	April 10–16, 2007	43%	41%	2	1,424 RV	±2.6%
Quinnipiac University	February 20–25, 2007	45%	41%	4	1,302 RV	±2.7%
Quinnipiac University	January 16–22, 2007	39%	42%	3	1,310 RV	±2.7%

Four-way race

Poll Source	Date administered (2008)	Barack Obama	John McCain	Bob Barr	Ralph Nader	Margin	Sample size	Margin of error
Zogby Interactive	June 11–30	49%	36%	3%	2%	13	1,220 LV	±2.9%

=== New Mexico ===
5 electoral votes
(Democrat in 2000)
(Republican in 2004)

Poll Source	Date administered (2008)	Barack Obama	John McCain	Margin	Sample size	Margin of error
Polimetrix/YouGov	October 18 – November 1	53%	43%	10	457 RV	Not reported
KOB-TV Albuquerque/SurveyUSA	October 30–31	52%	45%	7	664 LV	±3.9%
Public Policy Polling	October 28–30	58%	41%	17	1,537 LV	±2.5%
Albuquerque Journal/Research & Polling Inc.	October 28–30	51%	43%	8	659 LV	±3.8%
Rasmussen Reports/Pulse Opinion Research	October 28	54%	44%	10	500 LV	±4.5%
Zogby Interactive	October 17–20	46.1%	45.5%	0.6	534 LV	±4.3%
Rasmussen Reports/Pulse Opinion Research	October 13	55%	42%	13	700 LV	±4%
KOB-TV Albuquerque/SurveyUSA	October 12–13	52%	45%	7	568 LV	±4.2%
Zogby Interactive	October 9–13	51.2%	43.5%	7.7	532 LV	±4.3%
Rasmussen Reports/Pulse Opinion Research	October 1	49%	44%	5	700 LV	±4%
KOB-TV Albuquerque/SurveyUSA	September 29–30	52%	44%	8	698 LV	±3.8%
Public Policy Polling	September 17–19	53%	42%	11	1,037 LV	±3.0%
American Research Group	September 14–16	51%	44%	7	600 LV	±4%
KOB-TV Albuquerque/SurveyUSA	September 14–16	52%	44%	8	671 LV	±3.9%
Allstate/National Journal/Financial Dynamics	September 11–15	49%	42%	7	400 RV	±4.9%
Zogby Interactive	September 9–12	45.6%	44.1%	1.5	477 LV	±4.6%
Rasmussen Reports/Pulse Opinion Research	September 8	47%	49%	2	700 LV	±4%
CNN/Time/Opinion Research Corporation	August 24–26	53%	40%	13	659 RV	±4%
Rasmussen Reports/Pulse Opinion Research	August 20	48%	44%	4	700 LV	±4%
Las Vegas Review-Journal/Mason-Dixon Polling & Research	August 13–15	41%	45%	4	400 LV	±5%
Rasmussen Reports/Pulse Opinion Research	July 24	49%	43%	6	700 LV	±4%
	June 19	47%	39%	8	500 LV	±4.5%
KOB-TV Albuquerque/SurveyUSA	June 17–19	49%	46%	3	539 LV	±4.3%
KOB-TV Albuquerque/SurveyUSA	May 16–18	44%	44%	Tied	600 RV	±4.1%
Rasmussen Reports/Pulse Opinion Research	May 14	50%	41%	9	500 LV	±4%
KOB-TV Albuquerque/SurveyUSA	April 11–13	44%	50%	6	490 RV	±4.5%
Rasmussen Reports/Pulse Opinion Research	April 8	45%	42%	3	500 LV	±4.5%
KOB-TV Albuquerque/SurveyUSA	March 14–16	51%	45%	6	520 RV	±4.4%
SurveyUSA	February 26–28	50%	43%	7	601 RV	±4.1%
Rasmussen Reports/Pulse Opinion Research	February 18	44%	44%	Tied	500 LV	±4.5%
KOB-TV Albuquerque/SurveyUSA	February 15–17	55%	40%	15	506 RV	±4.4%
KOB-TV Albuquerque/SurveyUSA	January 20–21	41%	50%	9	501 RV	±4.5%
KOB-TV Albuquerque/SurveyUSA	December 13–15, 2007	40%	51%	11	523 RV	±4.4%
KOB-TV Albuquerque/SurveyUSA	November 9–11, 2007	40%	50%	10	506 RV	±4.4%
SurveyUSA	March 9–11, 2007	39%	50%	11	Not reported	Not reported
SurveyUSA	February 9–11, 2007	47%	44%	3	Not reported	Not reported
KOB-TV Albuquerque/SurveyUSA	January 12–14, 2007	39%	52%	13	496 RV	±4.5%

Three-way race

Poll Source	Date administered (2008)	Barack Obama	John McCain	Ralph Nader	Margin	Sample size	Margin of error
Albuquerque Journal/Research & Polling Inc.	September 29 – October 2	45%	40%	1%	5	659 LV	±3.8%

Four-way race

Poll Source	Date administered (2008)	Barack Obama	John McCain	Bob Barr	Ralph Nader	Margin	Sample size	Margin of error
Zogby Interactive	August 15–19	46%	37%	5%	1%	9	495 LV	±4.4%
Zogby Interactive	June 11–30	49%	33%	9%	2%	16	464 LV	±4.6%

Five-way race

Poll Source	Date administered (2008)	Barack Obama	John McCain	Bob Barr	Ralph Nader	Cynthia McKinney	Margin	Sample size	Margin of error
CNN/Time/Opinion Research Corporation	August 24–26	50%	36%	8%	0%	0%	14	659 RV	±4%

=== New York ===
31 electoral votes
(Democrat in 2000 & 2004)

Poll Source	Date administered (2008)	Barack Obama	John McCain	Margin	Sample size	Margin of error
Polimetrix/YouGov	October 18 – November 1	58%	38%	20	988 RV	Not reported
WABC-TV New York/WGRZ-TV Buffalo/WHEC-TV Rochester/WNYT-TV Albany/SurveyUSA	October 27–28	62%	33%	29	633 LV	±3.8%
Marist College	October 21–22	65%	29%	36	527 LV	±4.5%
Siena College	October 19–21	62%	31%	31	721 LV	±3.6%
Rasmussen Reports/Pulse Opinion Research	October 14	57%	37%	20	500 LV	±4.5%
WABC-TV New York/WGRZ-TV Buffalo/WHEC-TV Rochester/WNYT-TV Albany/SurveyUSA	October 11–12	61%	34%	27	547 LV	±4.1%
Siena College	September 28–30	58%	36%	22	631 RV	±3.9%
WABC-TV New York/WGRZ-TV Buffalo/WHEC-TV Rochester/WNYT-TV Albany/SurveyUSA	September 23–24	57%	38%	19	668 LV	±3.8%
American Research Group	September 14–16	55%	38%	17	600 LV	±4%
Rasmussen Reports/Pulse Opinion Research	September 15	55%	42%	13	500 LV	±4.5%
Siena College	September 8–10	46%	41%	5	626 RV	±3.9%
Siena College	August 11–14	47%	39%	8	627 RV	±3.9%
Rasmussen Reports/Pulse Opinion Research	August 4	55%	36%	19	500 LV	±4.5%
Quinnipiac University	July 31 – August 4	57%	36%	21	1,353 LV	±2.7%
Siena College	July 7–10	50%	37%	13	626 RV	±3.9%
Rasmussen Reports/Pulse Opinion Research	June 30	60%	29%	31	500 LV	±4.5%
WABC-TV New York/WHEC-TV Rochester/WNYT-TV Albany/SurveyUSA	June 25–27	57%	37%	20	531 LV	±4.3%
Siena College	June 9–11	51%	33%	18	624 RV	±3.9%
New York Times	June 6–11	51%	32%	19	931 RV	Not reported
Quinnipiac University	June 3–8	50%	36%	14	1,388 RV	±2.6%
Rasmussen Reports/Pulse Opinion Research	May 28	52%	33%	19	500 LV	±4%
WABC-TV New York/WHEC-TV Rochester/WNYT-TV Albany/SurveyUSA	May 16–18	48%	38%	10	600 RV	±4.1%
Siena College	May 12–15	49%	38%	11	622 RV	±3.9%
Rasmussen Reports/Pulse Opinion Research	April 29	52%	35%	17	500 LV	±4.5%
Siena College	April 13–16	45%	40%	5	624 RV	±3.9%
WABC-TV New York/WHEC-TV Rochester/WNYT-TV Albany/SurveyUSA	April 11–13	52%	43%	9	499 RV	±4.5%
WNBC News/Marist College	April 3–4	46%	48%	2	576 RV	±4%
Quinnipiac University	March 16–18	49%	38%	11	1,528 RV	±2.5%
WABC-TV New York/WHEC-TV Rochester/WNYT-TV Albany/SurveyUSA	March 14–16	52%	44%	8	507 RV	±4.4%
Rasmussen Reports/Pulse Opinion Research	March 11	51%	38%	13	500 LV	±4.5%
SurveyUSA	February 26–28	52%	38%	14	592 RV	±4.1%
WABC-TV New York/WHEC-TV Rochester/WNYT-TV Albany/SurveyUSA	February 15–17	57%	36%	21	519 RV	±4.3%
Siena College	February 11–14	47%	40%	7	633 RV	±3.9%
WABC-TV New York/WHEC-TV Rochester/WNYT-TV Albany/SurveyUSA	January 20–21	49%	43%	6	516 RV	±4.4%
Siena College	January 14–17	44%	42%	2	625 RV	±3.9%
WABC-TV New York/WHEC-TV Rochester/WNYT-TV Albany/SurveyUSA	December 13–15, 2007	47%	43%	4	503 RV	±4.5%
WABC-TV New York/WHEC-TV Rochester/WNYT-TV Albany/SurveyUSA	November 9–11, 2007	49%	43%	6	516 RV	±4.4%
Quinnipiac University	September 24–30, 2007	47%	39%	8	1,504 RV	±2.5%
Siena College	June 18–21, 2007	49%	35%	14	800 RV	±3.5%
Quinnipiac University	June 12–17, 2007	48%	33%	15	1,369 RV	±2.7%
Siena College	May 18–25, 2007	50%	33%	17	620 RV	±3.9%
Siena College	April 16–20, 2007	50%	37%	13	980 RV	Not reported
NY1 News/Blum & Weprin Associates	April 4–7, 2007	50%	35%	15	1,013 RV	Not reported
Quinnipiac University	March 29 – April 2, 2007	47%	36%	11	1,548 RV	±2.5%
Siena College	March 19–22, 2007	47%	39%	8	622 RV	Not reported
SurveyUSA	March 9–11, 2007	48%	43%	5	Not reported	Not reported
SurveyUSA	February 9–11, 2007	48%	41%	7	Not reported	Not reported
Quinnipiac University	February 6–11, 2007	46%	35%	11	1,049 RV	±3%
WABC-TV New York/WHEC-TV Rochester/WNYT-TV Albany/SurveyUSA	January 12–14, 2007	44%	45%	1	489 RV	±4.5%

Four-way race

Poll Source	Date administered (2008)	Barack Obama	John McCain	Bob Barr	Ralph Nader	Margin	Sample size	Margin of error
Siena College	July 17–29	44%	26%	2%	3%	18	671 RV	±3.8%
Zogby Interactive	June 11–30	51%	30%	4%	2%	21	3,647 LV	±1.7%

=== North Carolina ===
15 electoral votes
(Republican in 2000 & 2004)

Poll Source	Date administered (2008)	Barack Obama	John McCain	Margin	Sample size	Margin of error
American Research Group	October 31 – November 3	49%	48%	1	600 LV	±4%
Reuters/Zogby International	October 31 – November 3	49.1%	49.5%	0.4	600 LV	±4.1%
WTVD-TV Raleigh/SurveyUSA	October 31 – November 2	48%	49%	1	682 LV	±3.8%
Polimetrix/YouGov	October 18 – November 1	51%	47%	4	955 RV	Not reported
Elon University	October 27–30	44.6%	38.3%	6.3	797 LV	±3.5%
Rasmussen Reports/Pulse Opinion Research	October 29	50%	48%	2	1,000 LV	±3%
Politico/InsiderAdvantage	October 29	48%	48%	Tied	641 LV	±3.7%
NBC News/Mason-Dixon Polling & Research	October 28–29	46%	49%	3	625 LV	±4%
CNN/Time/Opinion Research Corporation	October 23–28	52%	46%	6	667 LV	±4%
Allstate/National Journal/Financial Dynamics	October 23–27	47%	43%	4	402 RV	±4.9%
Reuters/Zogby International	October 23–26	49.7%	46.4%	3.3	600 LV	±4.1%
Associated Press/Roper/GfK Group	October 22–26	48%	46%	2	601 LV	±4.0%
NBC News/Mason-Dixon Polling & Research	October 23–25	47%	47%	Tied	625 LV	±4%
Rasmussen Reports/Pulse Opinion Research	October 23	48%	50%	2	700 LV	±4%
WSOC-TV/Marshall Marketing & Communications	October 20–21	48.4%	46.4%	2	500 LV	±4.5%
CNN/Time/Opinion Research Corporation	October 19–21	51%	47%	4	644 LV	±4%
WTVD-TV Raleigh/SurveyUSA	October 18–20	47%	47%	Tied	627 LV	±4%
Zogby Interactive	October 17–20	49.6%	46.5%	3.1	921 LV	±3.3%
Politico/InsiderAdvantage	October 19	49%	48%	1	698 LV	±3.6%
ETV/Winthrop University	September 28 – October 19	44.6%	44.2%	0.4	744 LV	±3.6%
Poll Position/InsiderAdvantage	October 13	48%	46%	2	474 LV	±5%
Zogby Interactive	October 9–13	49.5%	46.1%	3.4	831 LV	±3.5%
Rasmussen Reports/Pulse Opinion Research	October 8	49%	48%	1	700 LV	±4%
WSOC-TV/Marshall Marketing & Communications	October 6–7	46%	47.8%	1.8	500 LV	±4.5%
WTVD-TV Raleigh/SurveyUSA	October 5–6	46%	49%	3	617 LV	±4%
CNN/Time/Opinion Research Corporation	October 3–6	49%	49%	Tied	666 LV	±4%
Rasmussen Reports/Pulse Opinion Research	September 30	50%	47%	3	700 LV	±4%
American Research Group	September 27–29	46%	49%	3	600 LV	±4%
Rasmussen Reports/Pulse Opinion Research	September 23	49%	47%	2	500 LV	±4.5%
Rasmussen Reports/Pulse Opinion Research	September 18	47%	50%	3	500 LV	±4.5%
Elon University	September 15–16	35%	41%	6	411 A	±4.9%
CNN/Time/Opinion Research Corporation	September 14–16	47%	48%	1	910 RV	±3.5%
American Research Group	September 13–16	41%	52%	11	600 LV	±4%
Zogby Interactive	September 9–12	48.1%	46.6%	1.5	635 LV	±4.0%
WTVD-TV Raleigh/SurveyUSA	September 6–8	38%	58%	20	671 LV	±3.8%
Garin-Hart-Yang Research Group (D)	September 5–7	46%	49%	3	605 LV	±4%
Rasmussen Reports/Pulse Opinion Research	August 13	44%	50%	6	700 LV	±4%
WTVD-TV Raleigh/SurveyUSA	August 9–11	45%	49%	4	655 LV	±3.9%
Rasmussen Reports/Pulse Opinion Research	July 15	45%	48%	3	500 LV	±4.5%
WTVD-TV Raleigh/SurveyUSA	July 12–14	45%	50%	5	676 LV	±3.8%
Rasmussen Reports/Pulse Opinion Research	June 10	43%	45%	2	500 LV	±4.5%
WTVD-TV Raleigh/SurveyUSA	May 17–19	43%	51%	8	713 LV	±3.7%
Civitas Institute/Tel Opinion Research	May 14–17	39%	44%	5	800 RV	±3.7%
Public Policy Polling	May 8–9	42%	49%	7	616 LV	±4.0%
Rasmussen Reports/Pulse Opinion Research	May 8	45%	48%	3	500 LV	±4.5%
Rasmussen Reports/Pulse Opinion Research	April 10	47%	47%	Tied	500 LV	±4%
Civitas Institute/Tel Opinion Research	April 9–10	39%	48%	9	800 RV	±3.7%
Rasmussen Reports/Pulse Opinion Research	March 20	42%	51%	9	500 LV	±4.5%
SurveyUSA	February 26–28	45%	47%	2	630 RV	±4%
Civitas Institute/Tel Opinion Research	February 19–22	36%	46%	10	800 RV	±3.7%
Public Policy Polling	February 18	42%	47%	5	686 LV	±3.7%
Public Policy Polling	January 21	38%	52%	14	762 LV	±3.6%
Public Policy Polling	June 19, 2007	44%	45%	1	545 LV	±4.15%

Three-way race

Poll Source	Date administered (2008)	Barack Obama	John McCain	Bob Barr	Margin	Sample size	Margin of error
Fox News/Rasmussen Reports/Pulse Opinion Research	November 2	49%	50%	0%	1	1,000 LV	±3%
Public Policy Polling	October 30 – November 2	50%	49%	1%	1	2,100 LV	±2.1%
Civitas Institute/Tel Opinion Research	October 27–29	47%	46%	3%	1	600 LV	±4.2%
CNN/Time/Opinion Research Corporation	October 23–28	52%	46%	2%	6	667 LV	±4%
	October 26	48%	49%	0%	1	1,000 LV	±3%
Public Policy Polling	October 25–26	49%	48%	1%	1	1,038 LV	±2.8%
CNN/Time/Opinion Research Corporation	October 19–21	51%	46%	2%	5	644 LV	±4%
Civitas Institute/Tel Opinion Research	October 18–20	48%	45%	1%	3	600 LV	±4.2%
Fox News/Rasmussen Reports/Pulse Opinion Research	October 19	51%	48%	0%	3%	1,000 LV	±3%
Public Policy Polling	October 18–19	51%	44%	2%	7	1,200 LV	±2.8%
Fox News/Rasmussen Reports/Pulse Opinion Research	October 12	48%	48%	1%	Tied	1,000 LV	±3%
Public Policy Polling	October 11–12	49%	46%	1%	3	1,196 LV	±2.8%
Civitas Institute/Tel Opinion Research	October 6–8	48%	43%	2%	5	600 LV	±4.2%
Public Policy Polling	October 4–5	50%	44%	2%	6	1,202 LV	±2.8%
Public Policy Polling	September 28–29	47%	45%	3%	2	1,041 LV	±3.0%
Civitas Institute/Tel Opinion Research	September 17–20	45%	45%	1%	Tied	600 LV	±4.2%
Public Policy Polling	September 17–19	46%	46%	5%	Tied	1,060 LV	±3.0%
Civitas Institute/Tel Opinion Research	September 6–10	44%	48%	0%	4	600 LV	±4.2%
Public Policy Polling	September 9	44%	48%	4%	4	626 LV	±3.9%
Democracy Corps/Greenberg Quinlan Rosner (D)	August 20–26	44%	47%	4%	3	852 LV	±3.5%
Public Policy Polling	August 20–23	42%	45%	4%	3	904 LV	±3.3%
Civitas Institute/Tel Opinion Research	August 14–17	40%	46%	6%	6	600 LV	±4.2%
Public Policy Polling	July 23–27	44%	47%	3%	3	823 LV	±3.4%
Civitas Institute/Tel Opinion Research	July 14–16	40%	43%	2%	3	600 LV	±4%
Public Policy Polling	June 26–29	41%	45%	3%	4	1,048 LV	±3.0%
Civitas Institute/Tel Opinion Research	June 11–13	41%	45%	2%	4	596 RV	±4%
Public Policy Polling	May 28–29	40%	43%	6%	3	543 LV	±4.2%

Four-way race

Poll Source	Date administered (2008)	Barack Obama	John McCain	Bob Barr	Ralph Nader	Margin	Sample size	Margin of error
Associated Press/Roper/GfK Group	October 22–26	48%	46%	0%	0%	2	601 LV	±4.0%
Majority Opinion/InsiderAdvantage	August 19	42.8%	44.5%	5.2%	0.9%	1.7	614 LV	±4%
Zogby Interactive	August 15–19	47%	39%	3%	2%	8	604 LV	±4.0%
Zogby Interactive	June 11–30	47%	38%	4%	1%	9	1,340 LV	±2.7%

=== North Dakota ===
3 electoral votes
(Republican in 2000 & 2004)

Poll Source	Date administered (2008)	Barack Obama	John McCain	Margin	Sample size	Margin of error
Polimetrix/YouGov	October 18 – November 1	43%	50%	7	271 RV	Not reported
North Dakota United Transportation Union/DFM Research (D)	October 13–14	44%	41%	3	504 RV	±4.4%
Fargo Forum/Minnesota State University Moorhead	October 6–8	45%	43%	2	606 LV	±4%
American Research Group	September 15–17	43%	52%	9	600 LV	±4%
Rasmussen Reports/Pulse Opinion Research	September 8	41%	55%	14	500 LV	±4.5%
North Dakota United Transportation Union/DFM Research (D)	August 23–27	43%	40%	3	400 RV	±5%
Rasmussen Reports/Pulse Opinion Research	July 8	43%	43%	Tied	500 LV	±4.5%
Dakota Wesleyan University	March 24 – April 3	38%	44%	6	260 RV	±6%
SurveyUSA	February 26–28	46%	42%	4	572 RV	±4.2%

=== Ohio ===
20 electoral votes
(Republican in 2000 & 2004)

Poll Source	Date administered (2008)	Barack Obama	John McCain	Margin	Sample size	Margin of error
Reuters/Zogby International	October 31 – November 3	49.4%	47.4%	2	600 LV	±4.1%
Public Policy Polling	October 31 – November 2	50%	48%	2	1,208 LV	±2.8%
WCMH-TV Columbus/WHIO-TV Dayton/WKYC-TV Cleveland/SurveyUSA	October 30 – November 2	48%	46%	2	660 LV	±3.9%
Quinnipiac University	October 27 – November 2	50%	43%	7	1,574 LV	±2.5%
Polimetrix/YouGov	October 18 – November 1	51%	45%	6	990 RV	Not reported
Columbus Dispatch	October 22–31	52%	46%	6	2,164 LV	±2%
NBC News/Mason-Dixon Polling & Research	October 28–29	45%	47%	2	625 LV	±4%
CNN/Time/Opinion Research Corporation	October 23–28	51%	47%	4	779 LV	±3.5%
WCMH-TV Columbus/WHIO-TV Dayton/WKYC-TV Cleveland/SurveyUSA	October 26–27	49%	45%	4	648 LV	±3.9%
Bloomberg/Los Angeles Times	October 24–27	49%	40%	9	644 LV	±4%
Allstate/National Journal/Financial Dynamics	October 23–27	48%	41%	7	404 RV	±4.9%
Marist College	October 24–26	48%	45%	3	661 LV	±4%
Reuters/Zogby International	October 23–26	49.7%	45.1%	4.6	600 LV	±4.1%
Quinnipiac University	October 22–26	51%	42%	9	1,425 LV	±2.6%
Associated Press/Roper/GfK Group	October 22–26	48%	42%	6	607 LV	±4.0%
Public Policy Polling	October 22–23	51%	44%	7	993 LV	±3.1%
Ohio University	October 12–23	57%	41%	16	611 A	±4%
Politico/InsiderAdvantage	October 22	52%	42%	10	408 LV	±5%
Big Ten	October 19–22	52.5%	41%	11.5	564 LV	±4.2%
CNN/Time/Opinion Research Corporation	October 19–21	50%	46%	4	737 LV	±3.5%
Quinnipiac University	October 16–21	52%	38%	14	1,360 LV	±2.7%
Zogby Interactive	October 17–20	46.5%	49.3%	2.8	991 LV	±3.2%
University of Akron	September 24 – October 19	44.6%	40.9%	3.7	1,213 RV	±2.8%
NBC News/Mason-Dixon Polling & Research	October 16–17	45%	46%	1	625 LV	±4%
Rasmussen Reports/Pulse Opinion Research	October 14	49%	49%	Tied	700 LV	±4%
WCMH-TV Columbus/WHIO-TV Dayton/WKYC-TV Cleveland/SurveyUSA	October 12–13	50%	45%	5	575 LV	±4.2%
Zogby Interactive	October 9–13	44.8%	49.5%	4.7	1,018 LV	±3.1%
Poll Position/InsiderAdvantage	October 9	49%	44%	5	509 LV	±4%
Marist College	October 5–8	49%	45%	4	771 LV	±3.5%
American Research Group	October 4–7	48%	45%	3	600 LV	±4%
CNN/Time/Opinion Research Corporation	October 3–6	50%	47%	3	749 LV	±3.5%
Public Policy Polling	October 4–5	49%	43%	6	1,239 LV	±2.8%
ABC News/Washington Post	October 3–5	51%	45%	6	772 LV	±3.5%
Columbus Dispatch	September 24 – October 3	49%	42%	7	2,262 LV	±2%
Poll Position/InsiderAdvantage	September 29	47%	45%	2	512 LV	±4%
WCMH-TV Columbus/WCPO-TV Cincinnati/WHIO-TV Dayton/WKYC-TV Cleveland/SurveyUSA	September 28–29	48%	49%	1	693 LV	±3.8%
Quinnipiac University	September 27–29	50%	42%	8	825 LV	±3.4%
Quinnipiac University	September 22–26	49%	42%	7	1,203 LV	±2.8%
Rasmussen Reports/Pulse Opinion Research	September 23	46%	47%	1	700 LV	±4%
Poll Position/InsiderAdvantage	September 22	46%	46%	Tied	545 LV	±4.1%
Big Ten	September 14–17	45.6%	45.1%	0.5	619 RV	±4%
CNN/Time/Opinion Research Corporation	September 14–16	49%	47%	2	913 RV	±3%
Allstate/National Journal/Financial Dynamics	September 11–15	41%	42%	1	400 RV	±4.9%
Marist College	September 11–15	47%	45%	2	565 LV	±4.5%
Public Policy Polling	September 13–14	44%	48%	4	1,077 LV	±3.0%
WCMH-TV Columbus/WCPO-TV Cincinnati/WHIO-TV Dayton/WKYC-TV Cleveland/SurveyUSA	September 12–14	45%	49%	4	692 LV	±3.8%
American Research Group	September 10–13	44%	50%	6	600 LV	±4%
Zogby Interactive	September 9–12	43.9%	49.8%	5.9	847 LV	±3.4%
Poll Position/InsiderAdvantage	September 10	47%	48%	1	503 LV	±4.3%
University of Cincinnati	September 5–10	44%	48%	4	775 LV	±3.5%
Quinnipiac University	September 5–9	49%	44%	5	1,367 LV	±2.7%
CNN/Time/Opinion Research Corporation	August 31 – September 2	47%	45%	2	685 RV	±3.5%
Quinnipiac University	August 17–24	44%	43%	1	1,234 LV	±2.8%
Rasmussen Reports/Pulse Opinion Research	August 18	43%	48%	5	700 LV	±4%
University of Akron	July 17 – August 17	39.6%	39.9%	0.3	753 RV	±3.6%
Public Policy Polling	August 12–14	45%	45%	Tied	950 LV	±3.2%
Quinnipiac University	July 23–29	46%	44%	2	1,229 LV	±2.8%
Rasmussen Reports/Pulse Opinion Research	July 21	42%	52%	10	500 LV	±4.5%
Public Policy Polling	July 17–20	48%	40%	8	1,058 LV	±3.0%
WCMH-TV Columbus/WCPO-TV Cincinnati/SurveyUSA	June 20–22	48%	46%	2	580 LV	±4.2%
Rasmussen Reports/Pulse Opinion Research	June 17	43%	44%	1	500 LV	±4.5%
Quinnipiac University	June 9–16	48%	42%	6	1,396 LV	±2.6%
Public Policy Polling	June 14–15	50%	39%	11	733 LV	±3.6%
Quinnipiac University	May 13–20	40%	44%	4	1,244 RV	±2.8%
WCMH-TV Columbus/WCPO-TV Cincinnati/SurveyUSA	May 16–18	48%	39%	9	600 RV	±4.1%
Rasmussen Reports/Pulse Opinion Research	May 15	44%	45%	1	500 LV	±4.5%
Quinnipiac University	April 23–29	42%	43%	1	1,127 RV	±2.9%
WCMH-TV Columbus/WCPO-TV Cincinnati/SurveyUSA	April 11–13	45%	47%	2	527 RV	±4.4%
Rasmussen Reports/Pulse Opinion Research	April 8	40%	47%	7	500 LV	±4.5%
Quinnipiac University	March 24–31	43%	42%	1	1,238 RV	±2.8%
Public Policy Polling	March 15–17	41%	49%	8	621 LV	±3.9%
WCMH-TV Columbus/WCPO-TV Cincinnati/SurveyUSA	March 14–16	43%	50%	7	532 RV	±4.3%
Rasmussen Reports/Pulse Opinion Research	March 13	40%	46%	6	500 LV	±4.5%
SurveyUSA	February 26–28	50%	40%	10	629 RV	±4%
University of Cincinnati	February 21–24	48%	47%	1	970 RV	±3%
Rasmussen Reports/Pulse Opinion Research	February 17	41%	42%	1	500 LV	±4.5%
WCMH-TV Columbus/WCPO-TV Cincinnati/WHIO-TV Dayton/WKYC-TV Cleveland/SurveyUSA	February 15–17	47%	44%	3	542 RV	±4.3%
Quinnipiac University	February 6–12	40%	42%	2	1,748 RV	±2.3%
WCMH-TV Columbus/WCPO-TV Cincinnati/SurveyUSA	January 4–6	43%	50%	7	535 RV	±4.3%
Public Policy Polling	January 4	42%	45%	3	946 LV	±3.1%
WCPO-TV Cincinnati/WYTV-TV Youngstown/SurveyUSA	December 13–15, 2007	38%	47%	9	539 RV	±4.3%
WCPO-TV Cincinnati/SurveyUSA	December 3, 2007	40%	51%	11	643 RV	±3.9%
WCPO-TV Cincinnati/WYTV-TV Youngstown/SurveyUSA	November 9–11, 2007	37%	52%	15	533 RV	±4.3%
Quinnipiac University	October 1–8, 2007	43%	39%	4	946 RV	±3.2%
Quinnipiac University	August 28 – September 3, 2007	41%	42%	1	1,430 RV	±2.6%
Quinnipiac University	July 3–9, 2007	43%	38%	5	1,447 RV	±2.6%
Quinnipiac University	June 18–25, 2007	43%	38%	5	1,013 RV	±3.1%
Quinnipiac University	May 8–13, 2007	44%	41%	3	939 RV	±3.2%
Quinnipiac University	April 17–24, 2007	36%	42%	6	1,083 RV	±3%
Quinnipiac University	March 13–19, 2007	45%	37%	8	1,122 RV	±2.9%
SurveyUSA	March 9–11, 2007	39%	50%	11	Not reported	Not reported
Quinnipiac University	February 25 – March 4, 2007	42%	39%	3	1,281 RV	±2.7%
SurveyUSA	February 9–11, 2007	41%	51%	10	Not reported	Not reported
Quinnipiac University	January 23–28, 2007	38%	41%	3	1,305 RV	±2.7%
WCPO-TV Cincinnati/WYTV-TV Youngstown/SurveyUSA	January 12–14, 2007	40%	54%	14	510 RV	±4.4%

Four-way race

Poll Source	Date administered (2008)	Barack Obama	John McCain	Bob Barr	Ralph Nader	Margin	Sample size	Margin of error
Ohio News Organization/University of Cincinnati	October 4–8	46%	48%	1%	2%	2	876 LV	±3%
Democracy Corps/Greenberg Quinlan Rosner (D)	September 29 – October 1	49%	43%	2%	2%	6	600 LV	±4%
Ohio News Organization/University of Cincinnati	September 12–16	42%	48%	1%	4%	6	869 LV	±3.3%
Columbus Dispatch	August 12–21	41%	42%	1%	1%	1	2,102 LV	±2.2%
Zogby Interactive	August 15–19	41%	36%	8%	1%	5	683 LV	±3.8%
Zogby Interactive	June 11–30	43%	38%	7%	2%	5	2,172 LV	±2.1%

Five-way race

Poll Source	Date administered (2008)	Barack Obama	John McCain	Bob Barr	Ralph Nader	Cynthia McKinney	Margin	Sample size	Margin of error
Fox News/Rasmussen Reports/Pulse Opinion Research	November 2	49%	49%	0%	1%	0%	Tied	1,000 LV	±3%
CNN/Time/Opinion Research Corporation	October 23–28	50%	43%	1%	3%	0%	7	779 LV	±3.5%
Fox News/Rasmussen Reports/Pulse Opinion Research	October 26	49%	45%	1%	0%	0%	4	1,000 LV	±3%
Ohio News Organization/University of Cincinnati	October 18–22	49%	46%	1%	2%	0%	3	886 LV	±3.3%
CNN/Time/Opinion Research Corporation	October 19–21	49%	44%	2%	3%	0%	5	737 LV	±3.5%
Fox News/Rasmussen Reports/Pulse Opinion Research	October 19	47%	49%	0%	1%	0%	2	1,000 LV	±3%
Fox News/Rasmussen Reports/Pulse Opinion Research	October 12	49%	47%	0%	1%	0%	2	1,000 LV	±3%
Fox News/Rasmussen Reports/Pulse Opinion Research	October 5	47%	48%	1%	1%	0%	1	1,000 LV	±3%
Fox News/Rasmussen Reports/Pulse Opinion Research	September 28	47%	48%	0%	0%	0%	1	500 LV	±4.5%
Fox News/Rasmussen Reports/Pulse Opinion Research	September 21	46%	50%	1%	1%	0%	4	500 LV	±4.5%
Fox News/Rasmussen Reports/Pulse Opinion Research	September 14	45%	48%	0%	1%	0%	4	500 LV	±4.5%
Fox News/Rasmussen Reports/Pulse Opinion Research	September 7	44%	51%	0%	1%	0%	7	500 LV	±4%

Seven-way race

Poll Source	Date administered (2008)	Barack Obama	John McCain	Bob Barr	Ralph Nader	Cynthia McKinney	Chuck Baldwin	Brian Moore	Margin	Sample size	Margin of error
Suffolk University	October 16–19	51%	42%	1%	1%	0%	0%	0%	9	600 LV	±4%
Suffolk University	September 10–13	42%	46%	1%	1%	1%	0%	0%	4	600 LV	±4%

Eight-way race

Poll Source	Date administered (2008)	Barack Obama	John McCain	Bob Barr	Ralph Nader	Cynthia McKinney	Chuck Baldwin	Brian Moore	Richard Duncan	Margin	Sample size	Margin of error
Associated Press/Roper/GfK Group	October 22–26	48%	41%	0%	0%	0%	0%	0%	0%	7	607 LV	±4.0%

=== Oklahoma ===
7 electoral votes
(Republican in 2000 & 2004)

Poll Source	Date administered (2008)	Barack Obama	John McCain	Margin	Sample size	Margin of error
Polimetrix/YouGov	October 18 – November 1	39%	58%	19	491 RV	Not reported
KFOR-TV Oklahoma City/SurveyUSA	October 28–29	34%	63%	29	594 LV	±4%
Oklahoma City News9/SoonerPoll	October 24–26	34.8%	61.6%	26.8	720 LV	±3.4%
KFOR-TV Oklahoma City/SurveyUSA	October 18–19	35%	59%	24	561 LV	±4.2%
Oklahoma City News9/SoonerPoll	October 10–12	31.9%	63%	31.1	813 LV	±3.44%
Oklahoma City News9/SoonerPoll	October 4–5	29.1%	65.5%	36.4	801 LV	±3.46%
KFOR-TV Oklahoma City/SurveyUSA	September 28–29	34%	64%	30	656 LV	±3.8%
Oklahoma City News9/SoonerPoll	September 26–28	26.5%	67.6%	41.6	904 LV	±3.25%
Oklahoma City News9/SoonerPoll	September 20–22	26.2%	65.8%	39.6	667 LV	±3.79%
American Research Group	September 15–18	34%	61%	27	600 LV	±4%
Oklahoma City News9/SoonerPoll	September 14	26.9%	69.1%	42.2	859 LV	±3.34%
Rasmussen Reports/Pulse Opinion Research	September 11	32%	63%	31	500 LV	±4.5%
Oklahoma City News9/SoonerPoll	September 7	27.9%	65.9%	38	894 LV	±3.27%
KFOR-TV Oklahoma City/SurveyUSA	September 5–7	35%	62%	27	652 LV	±3.7%
Tulsa World/KOTV/SoonerPoll	July 19–23	24%	56%	32	750 LV	±3.6%
Cole Hargrave Snodgrass & Associates	April 1–10	21%	62%	41	500 RV	±4.3%
SurveyUSA	February 26–28	34%	57%	23	599 RV	±4%
Tulsa World/KOTV/SoonerPoll	January 27–30	30%	58%	28	757 RV	±3.56%
Tulsa World/KOTV/SoonerPoll	December 16–19, 2007	26%	62%	36	745 RV	±3.59%

Four-way race

Poll Source	Date administered (2008)	Barack Obama	John McCain	Bob Barr	Ralph Nader	Margin	Sample size	Margin of error
Zogby Interactive	June 11–30	37%	42%	9%	2%	5	406 LV	±5.0%

=== Oregon ===
7 electoral votes
(Democrat in 2000 & 2004)

Poll Source	Date administered (2008)	Barack Obama	John McCain	Margin	Sample size	Margin of error
Polimetrix/YouGov	October 18 – November 1	54%	43%	11	698 RV	Not reported
Rasmussen Reports/Pulse Opinion Research	October 30	54%	42%	12	500 LV	±4%
Public Policy Polling	October 28–30	57%	42%	15	1,424 LV	±2.6%
Moore Information	October 27–28	51%	37%	14	400 RV	±5%
KATU-TV Portland/SurveyUSA	October 25–26	57%	38%	19	672 LV	±3.8%
Portland Tribune/Davis, Hibbitts & Midghall Inc.	October 23–25	53%	34%	19	500 RV	±4.4%
Riley Research Associates	October 10–20	48%	33%	15	499 LV	±4.4%
Rasmussen Reports/Pulse Opinion Research	October 14	54%	41%	13	500 LV	±4.5%
KATU-TV Portland/SurveyUSA	October 11–12	57%	40%	17	584 LV	±4.1%
Rasmussen Reports/Pulse Opinion Research	October 9	54%	43%	11	500 LV	±4.5%
KATU-TV Portland/Roll Call/SurveyUSA	September 22–23	52%	41%	11	708 LV	±3.8%
American Research Group	September 20–22	52%	41%	11	600 LV	±4%
Rasmussen Reports/Pulse Opinion Research	September 15	51%	47%	4	500 LV	±4.5%
Moore Information	September 10–11	43%	37%	6	408 RV	±5%
Rasmussen Reports/Pulse Opinion Research	August 7	52%	42%	10	500 LV	±4.5%
KATU-TV Portland/SurveyUSA	August 2–4	48%	45%	3	629 LV	±4%
Rasmussen Reports/Pulse Opinion Research	July 15	49%	40%	9	500 LV	±4.5%
KATU-TV Portland/SurveyUSA	June 17–19	48%	45%	3	547 LV	±4.3%
Rasmussen Reports/Pulse Opinion Research	June 11	46%	38%	8	500 LV	±4.5%
KATU-TV Portland/SurveyUSA	May 16–18	49%	39%	10	600 RV	±4.1%
Rasmussen Reports/Pulse Opinion Research	May 7	52%	38%	14	500 LV	±4.5%
KATU-TV Portland/SurveyUSA	April 11–13	51%	42%	9	543 RV	±4.3%
Rasmussen Reports/Pulse Opinion Research	March 26	48%	42%	6	500 LV	±4.5%
KATU-TV Portland/SurveyUSA	March 14–16	50%	41%	9	524 RV	±4.4%
SurveyUSA	February 26–28	49%	41%	8	628 RV	±4%
Riley Research Associates	February 7–18	46%	38%	8	401 LV	±4.89%
KATU-TV Portland/SurveyUSA	February 15–17	48%	47%	1	530 RV	±4.3%
Rasmussen Reports/Pulse Opinion Research	February 13	49%	40%	9	500 LV	±4.5%
KATU-TV Portland/SurveyUSA	January 11–13	47%	47%	Tied	544 RV	±4.3%
KATU-TV Portland/SurveyUSA	December 13–15, 2007	46%	44%	2	537 RV	±4.3%
KATU-TV Portland/SurveyUSA	November 9–11, 2007	45%	45%	Tied	523 RV	±4.4%
SurveyUSA	March 9–11, 2007	49%	43%	6	Not reported	Not reported
SurveyUSA	February 9–11, 2007	43%	47%	4	Not reported	Not reported
KATU-TV Portland/SurveyUSA	January 12–14, 2007	40%	51%	11	500 RV	±4.5

Three-way race

Poll Source	Date administered (2008)	Barack Obama	John McCain	Ralph Nader	Margin	Sample size	Margin of error
Portland Tribune/Davis, Hibbitts & Midghall Inc.	September 11–14	50%	40%	2	10	500 RV	±4.4%

Four-way race

Poll Source	Date administered (2008)	Barack Obama	John McCain	Bob Barr	Ralph Nader	Margin	Sample size	Margin of error
Grove Insight (D)	October 7–9	52%	39%	1%	1%	13	600 LV	±4%
Hoffman Research Group	September 8–9	46%	39%	1%	1%	7	600 LV	±4%
Zogby Interactive	June 11–30	49%	33%	6%	1%	16	821 LV	±3.5%

=== Pennsylvania ===
21 electoral votes
(Democrat in 2000 & 2004)

Poll Source	Date administered (2008)	Barack Obama	John McCain	Margin	Sample size	Margin of error
Reuters/Zogby International	October 31 – November 3	51.2%	41.4%	9.8	600 LV	±4.1%
KDKA-TV Philadelphia/WCAU-TV Pittsburgh/WHTM-TV Harrisburg/WJAC-TV Johnstown-Altoona/WNEP-TV Wilkes-Barre Scranton/SurveyUSA	October 31 – November 3	52%	43%	9	657 LV	±3.9%
Public Policy Polling	October 31 – November 2	53%	45%	8	1,529 LV	±2.5%
Quinnipiac University	October 27 – November 2	52%	42%	10	1,493 LV	±2.5%
Rasmussen Reports/Pulse Opinion Research	November 1	52%	46%	6	700 LV	±4%
Polimetrix/YouGov	October 18 – November 1	51%	44%	7	1,009 RV	Not reported
American Research Group	October 29–31	51%	45%	6	600 LV	±4%
KDKA-TV Philadelphia/WCAU-TV Pittsburgh/WHTM-TV Harrisburg/WJAC-TV Johnstown-Altoona/WNEP-TV Wilkes-Barre Scranton/SurveyUSA	October 29–31	51%	44%	7	700 LV	±3.8%
Rasmussen Reports/Pulse Opinion Research	October 30	51%	47%	4	500 LV	±4.5%
Morning Call/Muhlenberg College	October 26–30	53%	43%	10	615 LV	±4.0%
NBC News/Mason-Dixon Polling & Research	October 27–28	47%	43%	4	625 LV	±4%
CNN/Time/Opinion Research Corporation	October 23–28	55%	43%	12	768 LV	±3.5%
Rasmussen Reports/Pulse Opinion Research	October 27	53%	46%	7	500 LV	±4.5%
Marist College	October 26–27	55%	41%	14	713 LV	±4%
Politico/InsiderAdvantage	October 26	51%	42%	9	588 LV	±3.8%
Associated Press/Roper/GfK Group	October 22–26	53%	40%	13	607 LV	±4.0%
Quinnipiac University	October 22–26	53%	41%	12	1,364 LV	±2.7%
Franklin & Marshall College	October 21–26	51%	39%	12	545 LV	±4.2%
Temple University	October 20–26	52%	43%	9	761 LV	±3.6%
Morning Call/Muhlenberg College (Daily Tracking)	October 21–25	53%	41%	12	597 LV	±4.0%
KDKA-TV Philadelphia/WCAU-TV Pittsburgh/WHTM-TV Harrisburg/WJAC-TV Johnstown-Altoona/WNEP-TV Wilkes-Barre Scranton/SurveyUSA	October 21–22	53%	41%	12	620 LV	±4%
Big Ten	October 19–22	51.9%	41.5%	10.4	566 LV	±4.2%
Quinnipiac University	October 16–21	53%	40%	13	1,425 LV	±2.6%
Morning Call/Muhlenberg College (Daily Tracking)	October 16–20	52%	42%	10	600 LV	±4.0%
Allstate/National Journal/Financial Dynamics	October 16–20	51%	41%	10	412 RV	±4.9%
Susquehanna Polling & Research Inc.	October 16–18	48%	40%	8	700 LV	±3.7%
Morning Call/Muhlenberg College (Daily Tracking)	October 11–15	53%	37%	16	595 LV	±4.0%
KDKA-TV Philadelphia/WCAU-TV Pittsburgh/WHTM-TV Harrisburg/WJAC-TV Johnstown-Altoona/WNEP-TV Wilkes-Barre Scranton/SurveyUSA	October 11–13	55%	40%	15	516 LV	±4.4%
Zogby Interactive	October 9–13	51.6%	40.2%	10.4	737 LV	±3.7%
Morning Call/Muhlenberg College (Daily Tracking)	October 6–10	52%	40%	12	Not reported	Not reported
Marist College	October 5–8	53%	41%	12	757 LV	±3.5%
Rasmussen Reports/Pulse Opinion Research	October 6	54%	41%	13	700 LV	±4%
KDKA-TV Philadelphia/WCAU-TV Pittsburgh/WHTM-TV Harrisburg/WJAC-TV Johnstown-Altoona/WNEP-TV Wilkes-Barre Scranton/SurveyUSA	October 5–6	55%	40%	15	653 LV	±3.9%
WHYY-TV Philadelphia/West Chester University	October 3–6	52.3%	42%	10.3	506 RV	Not reported
Morning Call/Muhlenberg College (Daily Tracking)	October 1–5	49%	38%	11	601 LV	±4.0%
Morning Call/Muhlenberg College (Daily Tracking)	September 26–30	48%	41%	7	598 LV	±4.0%
Quinnipiac University	September 27–29	54%	39%	15	832 LV	±3.4%
Franklin & Marshall College	September 23–28	45%	38%	7	767 RV	±3.5%
Quinnipiac University	September 22–26	49%	43%	6	1,138 LV	±2.9%
Morning Call/Muhlenberg College (Daily Tracking)	September 21–25	47%	43%	4	577 LV	±4.5%
Rasmussen Reports/Pulse Opinion Research	September 24	49%	45%	4	700 LV	±4%
KDKA-TV Philadelphia/WCAU-TV Pittsburgh/WHTM-TV Harrisburg/WJAC-TV Johnstown-Altoona/WNEP-TV Wilkes-Barre Scranton/SurveyUSA	September 23–24	50%	44%	6	1,094 LV	±3%
CNN/Time/Opinion Research Group	September 21–23	53%	44%	9	730 LV	±3.5%
American Research Group	September 19–22	50%	46%	4	600 LV	±4%
Allstate/National Journal/Financial Dynamics	September 18–22	43%	41%	2	406 RV	±4.9%
NBC News/Mason-Dixon Polling & Research	September 16–18	46%	44%	2	625 LV	±4%
Big Ten	September 14–17	45%	44.6%	0.4	608 RV	±4%
Marist College	September 11–15	49%	44%	5	535 LV	±4.5%
Zogby Interactive	September 9–12	44.3%	49.1%	4.8	701 LV	±3.8%
Quinnipiac University	September 5–9	48%	45%	3	1,001 LV	±3.1%
CNN/Time/Opinion Research Corporation	August 24–26	48%	43%	5	669 RV	±4%
Quinnipiac University	August 17–24	49%	42%	7	1,234 LV	±2.8%
Rasmussen Reports/Pulse Opinion Research	August 19	48%	45%	3	700 LV	±4%
Susquehanna Polling & Research Inc.	August 11–14	46%	41%	5	700 LV	±3.7%
Franklin & Marshall College	August 4–10	46%	41%	5	641 RV	±3.9%
Quinnipiac University	July 23–29	49%	42%	7	1,317 LV	±2.7%
Rasmussen Reports/Pulse Opinion Research	July 23	51%	45%	6	700 LV	±4%
Rasmussen Reports/Pulse Opinion Research	June 19, 22	46%	42%	4	1,000 LV	±3%
Franklin & Marshall College	June 16–22	42%	36%	6	1,501 RV	±2.5%
Quinnipiac University	June 9–16	52%	40%	12	1,511 RV	±2.5%
Rasmussen Reports/Pulse Opinion Research	May 21	45%	43%	2	500 LV	±4.5%
Quinnipiac University	May 13–20	46%	40%	6	1,667 RV	±2.4%
WCAU-TV Philadelphia/SurveyUSA	May 16–18	48%	40%	8	600 RV	±4.1%
Susquehanna Polling & Research Inc.	May 1–6	46%	39%	7	800 RV	±3.4%
Quinnipiac University	April 23–29	47%	38%	9	1,494 RV	±2.5%
Rasmussen Reports/Pulse Opinion Research	April 24	43%	44%	1	500 LV	±4%
Rasmussen Reports/Pulse Opinion Research	April 9	47%	39%	8	500 LV	±4.5%
Temple University	March 27 – April 9	47%	40%	7	1,175 RV	±3%
Quinnipiac University	March 24–31	43%	39%	4	3,484 RV	±1.7%
Rasmussen Reports/Pulse Opinion Research	March 10	43%	44%	1	500 LV	±4.5%
Triad Strategies/Susquehanna Polling & Research Inc.	March 5–10	41%	45%	4	700 RV	Not reported
SurveyUSA	February 26–28	42%	47%	5	608 RV	±4.1%
Quinnipiac University	February 21–25	42%	40%	2	1,872 RV	±2.3%
Franklin & Marshall College	February 13–18	43%	44%	1	640 RV	±3.9%
Morning Call/Muhlenberg College	February 9–17	39%	42%	3	588 RV	±4.6%
Rasmussen Reports/Pulse Opinion Research	February 14	49%	39%	10	500 LV	±4.5%
Quinnipiac University	February 6–12	42%	41%	1	1,419 RV	±2.6%
Fox News/Rasmussen Reports/Pulse Opinion Research	January 8	38%	46%	8	500 LV	±3.5%
Quinnipiac University	October 1–8, 2007	45%	41%	4	878 RV	±3.3%
Franklin & Marshall College	August 24 – September 2, 2007	47%	42%	5	479 RV	±4.5%
Quinnipiac University	August 14–20, 2007	43%	40%	3	1,160 RV	±2.9%
Quinnipiac University	June 18–25, 2007	44%	39%	5	958 RV	±3.2%
Quinnipiac University	May 22, 2007	41%	42%	1	1,318 RV	±2.7%
Morning Call/Muhlenberg College	May 15–21, 2007	36%	39%	3	416 RV	Not reported
Quinnipiac University	April 17–24, 2007	43%	41%	2	988 RV	±3.1%
Quinnipiac University	March 19–25, 2007	42%	42%	Tied	1,187 RV	±2.8%
Quinnipiac University	February 25 – March 4, 2007	38%	43%	5	1,134 RV	±2.9%
Franklin & Marshall College	February 19–25, 2007	37%	43%	6	540 RV	±4.2%
Quinnipiac University	February 1–5, 2007	39%	46%	7	1,104 RV	±3.1%

Four-way race

Poll Source	Date administered (2008)	Barack Obama	John McCain	Bob Barr	Ralph Nader	Margin	Sample size	Margin of error
CNN/Opinion Research Corporation	October 23–28	53%	41%	2%	3%	12	768 LV	±3.5%
Associated Press/Roper/GfK Group	October 22–26	52%	40%	1%	1%	12	607 LV	±4.0%
Fox News/Rasmussen Reports/Pulse Opinion Research	September 28	50%	42%	2%	3%	8	500 LV	±4.5%
Fox News/Rasmussen Reports/Pulse Opinion Research	September 21	48%	45%	1%	1%	3	500 LV	±4.5%
Fox News/Rasmussen Reports/Pulse Opinion Research	September 14	47%	47%	1%	1%	Tied	500 LV	±4.5%
Fox News/Rasmussen Reports/Pulse Opinion Research	September 7	47%	45%	1%	1%	2	500 LV	±4.5%
CNN/Time/Opinion Research Corporation	August 24–26	47%	38%	1%	7%	9	669 RV	±4%
Zogby Interactive	August 15–19	46%	37%	5%	3%	9	557 LV	±4.2%
Zogby Interactive	June 11–30	46%	36%	5%	2%	10	1,935 LV	±2.3%

=== Rhode Island ===
4 electoral votes
(Democrat in 2000 & 2004)

Poll Source	Date administered (2008)	Barack Obama	John McCain	Margin	Sample size	Margin of error
Polimetrix/YouGov	October 18 – November 1	58%	37%	21	365 RV	Not reported
Rhode Island College	September 17–24	45%	31%	14	742 RV	±3.6%
Brown University	September 15–16	47.4%	34%	13.4	652 RV	±3.8%
Rasmussen Reports/Pulse Opinion Research	September 13	58%	39%	19	500 LV	±4.5%
American Research Group	September 11–13	59%	33%	26	600 LV	±4%
Brown University	August 18–20	50.6%	30%	20.6	548 RV	±4%
Rasmussen Reports/Pulse Opinion Research	June 30	55%	31%	24	500 LV	±4.5%
Rhode Island College	June 18–27	53%	25%	28	500 RV	±4.0%
SurveyUSA	February 26–28	53%	38%	15	628 RV	±4%
Brown University	February 9–10	42%	30%	12	739 RV	±4%
Brown University	September 8–9, 2007	46%	27%	19	571 RV	±4%
Brown University	January 27, 2007	40%	37%	3	475 RV	±5%

=== South Carolina ===
8 electoral votes
(Republican in 2000 & 2004)

Poll Source	Date administered (2008)	Barack Obama	John McCain	Margin	Sample size	Margin of error
Polimetrix/YouGov	October 18 – November 1	44%	52%	8	728 RV	Not reported
WCSC-TV Charleston/SurveyUSA	October 28–29	44%	52%	8	654 LV	±3.9%
NBC News/Princeton Survey Research Associates International	October 25–28	42%	53%	11	400 LV	±5%
Rasmussen Reports/Pulse Opinion Research	October 20	43%	54%	11	500 LV	±4.5%
ETV/Winthrop University	September 28 – October 19	34.9%	55.1%	20.2	617 LV	±3.9%
WCSC-TV Charleston/SurveyUSA	October 12–13	41%	55%	14	561 LV	±4.2%
WCSC-TV Charleston/SurveyUSA	September 21–22	39%	58%	19	690 LV	±3.8%
Rasmussen Reports/Pulse Opinion Research	September 18	45%	51%	6	500 LV	±4.5%
American Research Group	September 14–17	37%	59%	22	600 LV	±4%
Rasmussen Reports/Pulse Opinion Research	June 5	39%	48%	9	500 LV	±4%
SurveyUSA	February 26–28	45%	48%	3	595 RV	±4.1%

Three-way race

Poll Source	Date administered (2008)	Barack Obama	John McCain	Bob Barr	Margin	Sample size	Margin of error
Public Policy Polling	July 9–11	39%	45%	5%	6	542 LV	±4.2%

Four-way race

Poll Source	Date administered (2008)	Barack Obama	John McCain	Bob Barr	Ralph Nader	Margin	Sample size	Margin of error
Zogby Interactive	June 18–30	42%	41%	6%	1%	1	630 LV	±4.0%

=== South Dakota ===
3 electoral votes
(Republican in 2000 & 2004)

Poll Source	Date administered (2008)	Barack Obama	John McCain	Margin	Sample size	Margin of error
Polimetrix/YouGov	October 18 – November 1	43%	52%	9	352 RV	Not reported
Rasmussen Reports/Pulse Opinion Research	October 30	44%	53%	9	500 LV	±4.5%
Argus Leader Media/KELO-TV/Mason-Dixon Polling & Research	October 13–15	41%	48%	7	800 LV	±3.5%
American Research Group	September 19–21	39%	55%	16	600 LV	±4%
Rasmussen Reports/Pulse Opinion Research	September 9	37%	54%	17	500 LV	±4.5%
Rasmussen Reports/Pulse Opinion Research	July 9	43%	47%	4	500 LV	±4.5%
Dakota Wesleyan University	March 24 – April 3	34%	51%	17	267 RV	±6%
Rasmussen Reports/Pulse Opinion Research	March 4	38%	48%	10	500 LV	±4.5%
SurveyUSA	February 26–28	43%	47%	4	632 RV	±4%

=== Tennessee ===
11 electoral votes
(Republican in 2000 & 2004)

Poll Source	Date administered (2008)	Barack Obama	John McCain	Margin	Sample size	Margin of error
Polimetrix/YouGov	October 18 – November 1	44%	53%	9	653 RV	Not reported
Rasmussen Reports/Pulse Opinion Research	October 16	42%	54%	12	500 LV	±4.5%
Ayres, McHenry & Associates (R)	October 12–15	39%	54%	15	600 LV	±4%
Rasmussen Reports/Pulse Opinion Research	September 29	39%	58%	19	500 LV	±4.5%
Middle Tennessee State University	September 15–27	35%	55%	20	357 LV	Not reported
Chattanooga Times Free Press/Mason-Dixon Polling & Research	September 22–24	39%	55%	16	625 LV	±4%
American Research Group	September 16–19	36%	59%	23	600 LV	±4%
Rasmussen Reports/Pulse Opinion Research	August 20	35%	60%	25	500 LV	±4.5%
Ayres, McHenry & Associates (R)	August 10–12	36%	51%	15	500 RV	±4.38%
Rasmussen Reports/Pulse Opinion Research	June 24	36%	51%	15	500 LV	±4.5%
Rasmussen Reports/Pulse Opinion Research	April 3	31%	58%	27	500 LV	±4.5%
Ayres, McHenry & Associates (R)	March 5–9	36%	53%	17	600 RV	±4%
SurveyUSA	February 26–28	38%	54%	16	618 RV	±4%
Middle Tennessee State University	February 11–23	36%	50%	14	577 A	±4%
Middle Tennessee State University	October 17–27, 2007	35%	44%	9	593 A	±4%

Four-way race

Poll Source	Date administered (2008)	Barack Obama	John McCain	Bob Barr	Ralph Nader	Margin	Sample size	Margin of error
Zogby Interactive	June 11–30	36%	41%	7%	1%	5	1,004 LV	±3.2%

=== Texas ===
34 electoral votes
(Republican in 2000 & 2004)

Poll Source	Date administered (2008)	Barack Obama	John McCain	Margin	Sample size	Margin of error
Polimetrix/YouGov	October 18 – November 1	43%	54%	11	972 RV	Not reported
Rasmussen Reports/Pulse Opinion Research	October 21	44%	54%	10	500 LV	±4.5%
American Research Group	October 5–8	38%	57%	19	600 LV	±4%
Rasmussen Reports/Pulse Opinion Research	September 29	43%	52%	9	500 LV	±4.5%
American Research Group	September 16–19	36%	57%	21	600 LV	±4%
Rasmussen Reports/Pulse Opinion Research	August 21	44%	54%	10	500 LV	±4.5%
Rasmussen Reports/Pulse Opinion Research	July 30	44%	52%	8	500 LV	±4.5%
	June 25	39%	48%	9	500 LV	±4.5%
Rasmussen Reports/Pulse Opinion Research	June 2	39%	52%	13	500 LV	±4.5%
Baselice & Associates	May 20–25	36%	52%	16	1,005 RV	±3%
Rasmussen Reports/Pulse Opinion Research	May 1	43%	48%	5	500 LV	±4.5%
Baselice & Associates	April 25	35%	52%	17	801 RV	Not reported
IVR Polls	February 28, March 1	Not reported	Not reported	22	2,922 LV	±1.8%
WFAA-TV Dallas/Belo/Public Strategies Inc.	February 28 – March 1	42%	49%	7	778 LV	±3.4%
SurveyUSA	February 26–28	46%	47%	1	600 RV	±4.1%
KRLD-AM Dallas/KTRK-TV Houston/KTVT-TV Dallas/SurveyUSA	February 23–25	41%	49%	8	1,725 RV	±2.4%
CNN/Opinion Research Corporation	February 14–17	44%	52%	8	1,247 RV	±3%
Texas Lyceum	April 26 – May 7, 2007	25%	32%	7	Not reported	Not reported

Three-way race

Poll Source	Date administered (2008)	Barack Obama	John McCain	Bob Barr	Margin	Sample size	Margin of error
University of Texas at Austin	October 15–22	38%	49.3%	1.3%	11.3	550 RV	±4.2%

Four-way race

Poll Source	Date administered (2008)	Barack Obama	John McCain	Bob Barr	Ralph Nader	Margin	Sample size	Margin of error
University of Texas at Austin	July 18–30	33%	43%	5%	2%	10	668 RV	Not reported
Zogby Interactive	June 11–30	39%	42%	6%	2%	3	3,289 LV	±1.7%
Texas Lyceum	June 12–20	38%	43%	1%	1%	5	Not reported	Not reported

=== Utah ===
5 electoral votes
(Republican in 2000 & 2004)

Poll Source	Date administered (2008)	Barack Obama	John McCain	Margin	Sample size	Margin of error
Polimetrix/YouGov	October 18 – November 1	34%	61%	27	395 RV	Not reported
Deseret News/KSL-TV/Dan Jones & Associates	October 24–30	32%	57%	25	1,205 RV	±2.9%
Salt Lake Tribune/Mason-Dixon Polling & Research	October 23–25	32%	55%	23	625 LV	±4%
American Research Group	September 10–13	29%	65%	36	600 LV	±4%
Deseret News/KSL-TV/Dan Jones & Associates	September 8–11	24%	62%	38	601 RV	±4%
Rasmussen Reports/Pulse Opinion Research	September 10	32%	64%	32	500 LV	±4%
Las Vegas Review-Journal/Mason-Dixon Polling & Research	August 13–15	23%	62%	39	400 LV	±5%
Rasmussen Reports/Pulse Opinion Research	June 19	33%	52%	19	500 LV	±4%
KSL-TV/Dan Jones & Associates	June 1–3	31%	54%	23	252 LV	Not reported
Deseret News/KSL-TV/Dan Jones & Associates	May 13–19	27%	62%	35	604 RV	±4%
SurveyUSA	February 26–28	39%	50%	11	608 RV	±4.1%

Three-way race

Poll Source	Date administered (2008)	Barack Obama	John McCain	Ralph Nader	Margin	Sample size	Margin of error
Deseret News/KSL-TV/Dan Jones & Associates	June 16–19	29%	57%	1%	28	405 RV	Not reported

=== Vermont ===
3 electoral votes
(Democrat in 2000 & 2004)

Poll Source	Date administered (2008)	Barack Obama	John McCain	Margin	Sample size	Margin of error
Polimetrix/YouGov	October 18 – November 1	62%	32%	30	275 RV	Not reported
Rasmussen Reports/Pulse Opinion Research	October 6	65%	32%	33	500 LV	±4.5%
American Research Group	September 18–22	56%	38%	18	600 LV	±4%
Rasmussen Reports/Pulse Opinion Research	September 13	60%	36%	24	500 LV	±4.5%
SurveyUSA	February 26–28	63%	29%	34	626 RV	±3.9%

=== Virginia ===
13 electoral votes
(Republican in 2000 & 2004)

Poll Source	Date administered (2008)	Barack Obama	John McCain	Margin	Sample size	Margin of error
Reuters/Zogby International	October 31 – November 3	51.7%	45.3%	6.4	600 LV	±4.1%
American Research Group	October 31 – November 3	51%	47%	4	600 LV	±4%
Public Policy Polling	October 31 – November 2	52%	46%	6	1,557 LV	±2.5%
WDBJ-TV Roanoke/WJHL-TV Tri-Cities/WJLA-TV Washington, D.C./WTVR-TV Richmond/SurveyUSA	October 30 – November 1	50%	46%	4	672 LV	±3.9%
Polimetrix/YouGov	October 18 – November 1	52%	45%	7	772 RV	Not reported
The Virginian-Pilot/Mason-Dixon Polling & Research	October 29–30	47%	44%	3	625 LV	±4%
CNN/Time/Opinion Research Corporation	October 23–28	53%	44%	9	774 LV	±3.5%
Marist College	October 26–27	51%	47%	4	671 LV	±4%
Allstate/National Journal/Financial Dynamics	October 23–27	48%	44%	4	404 RV	±4.9%
WDBJ-TV Roanoke/WJHL-TV Tri-Cities/WJLA-TV Washington, D.C./WTVR-TV Richmond/SurveyUSA	October 25–26	52%	43%	9	671 LV	±3.9%
Reuters/Zogby International	October 23–26	52%	44.8%	7.2	600 LV	±4.1%
Associated Press/Roper/GfK Group	October 22–26	49%	42%	7	601 LV	±4.0%
Roanoke College	October 19–26	48%	39%	9	614 LV	±4%
Washington Post	October 22–25	52%	44%	8	784 LV	±3.5%
Virginia Commonwealth University	October 20–22	51%	40%	11	817 LV	±4.3%
NBC News/Mason-Dixon Polling & Research	October 20–21	47%	45%	2	625 LV	±4%
CNN/Time/Opinion Research Corporation	October 19–21	54%	44%	10	647 LV	±4%
Zogby Interactive	October 17–20	49.7%	46.1%	3.6	922 LV	±3.3%
WDBJ-TV Roanoke/WJHL-TV Tri-Cities/WJLA-TV Washington, D.C./WTVR-TV Richmond/SurveyUSA	October 18–19	51%	45%	6	652 LV	±3.9%
ETV/Winthrop University	September 28 – October 19	44.6%	43.6%	1	665 LV	±3.8%
Rasmussen Reports/Pulse Opinion Research	October 16	54%	44%	10	700 LV	±3%
CNN/Time/Opinion Research Corporation	October 11–14	53%	43%	10	698 LV	±3.5%
Christopher Newport University	October 11–14	52.3%	46.8%	5.5	500 LV	±4.38%
Zogby Interactive	October 9–13	51.8%	44%	7.8	872 LV	±3.4%
Public Policy Polling	October 6–7	51%	43%	8	917 LV	±3.2%
WDBJ-TV Roanoke/WJHL-TV Tri-Cities/WJLA-TV Washington, D.C./WTVR-TV Richmond/SurveyUSA	October 3–5	53%	43%	10	666 LV	±3.9%
The Virginian-Pilot/The Richmond Times-Dispatch/Mason-Dixon Polling & Research	September 29 – October 1	45%	48%	3	625 LV	±4%
CNN/Time/Opinion Research Corporation	September 28–30	53%	44%	9	684 LV	±4%
Poll Position/InsiderAdvantage	September 29	51%	45%	6	436 LV	±5%
American Research Group	September 27–29	46%	49%	3	600 LV	±4%
Rasmussen Reports/Pulse Opinion Research	September 25	50%	45%	5	700 LV	±4%
NBC News/Mason-Dixon Polling & Research	September 17–22	44%	47%	3	625 LV	±4%
WDBJ-TV Roanoke/WJHL-TV Tri-Cities/WJLA-TV Washington, D.C./WTVR-TV Richmond/SurveyUSA	September 19–21	51%	45%	6	716 LV	±3.7%
ABC News/Washington Post	September 18–21	49%	46%	3	698 LV	±3.5%
American Research Group	September 17–20	46%	48%	2	600 LV	±4%
Poll Position/InsiderAdvantage	September 17	46%	48%	2	502 LV	±4.3%
Allstate/National Journal/Financial Dynamics	September 11–15	41%	49%	8	400 RV	±4.9%
Public Policy Polling	September 13–14	48%	46%	2	1,090 LV	±3.0%
WDBJ-TV Roanoke/WJHL-TV Tri-Cities/WJLA-TV Washington, D.C./WTVR-TV Richmond/SurveyUSA	September 12–14	50%	46%	4	732 LV	±3.7%
Christopher Newport University	September 10–14	39%	48%	9	500 RV	±4.4%
Zogby Interactive	September 9–12	43.8%	50.3%	6.5	689 LV	±3.8%
CNN/Time/Opinion Research Corporation	September 7–9	46%	50%	4	920 RV	±3%
WDBJ-TV Roanoke/WJHL-TV Tri-Cities/WJLA-TV Washington, D.C./WTVR-TV Richmond/SurveyUSA	September 5–7	47%	49%	2	717 LV	±3.7%
Public Policy Polling	August 20–22	47%	45%	2	1,036 LV	±3.0%
Poll Position/InsiderAdvantage	August 12	42.6%	43.1%	0.5	416 LV	±5%
Rasmussen Reports/Pulse Opinion Research	August 12	47%	48%	1	700 LV	±4.5%
WDBJ-TV Roanoke/WJLA-TV Washington, D.C./SurveyUSA	August 8–10	47%	48%	1	655 LV	±3.9%
Public Policy Polling	July 17–20	46%	44%	2	1,327 LV	±2.7%
Rasmussen Reports/Pulse Opinion Research	July 17	47%	48%	1	500 LV	±4.5%
WDBJ-TV Roanoke/WJLA-TV Washington, D.C./SurveyUSA	June 20–22	49%	47%	2	630 LV	±4%
Public Policy Polling	June 14–16	47%	45%	2	893 LV	±3.3%
Rasmussen Reports/Pulse Opinion Research	June 12	45%	44%	1	500 LV	±4.5%
WDBJ-TV Roanoke/WJLA-TV Washington, D.C./SurveyUSA	May 16–18	49%	42%	7	600 RV	±4.1%
Virginia Commonwealth University	May 12–18	39%	47%	8	852 RV	±4%
Rasmussen Reports/Pulse Opinion Research	May 8	44%	47%	3	500 LV	±4.5%
WDBJ-TV Roanoke/WJLA-TV Washington, D.C./SurveyUSA	April 11–13	44%	52%	8	515 RV	±4.4%
Rasmussen Reports/Pulse Opinion Research	March 27	41%	52%	11	500 LV	±4.5%
WDBJ-TV Roanoke/WJLA-TV Washington, D.C./SurveyUSA	March 14–16	48%	47%	1	520 RV	±4.4%
SurveyUSA	February 26–28	47%	47%	Tied	629 RV	±4%
Rasmussen Reports/Pulse Opinion Research	February 19	44%	49%	5	500 LV	±4.5%
WDBJ-TV Roanoke/WJLA-TV Washington, D.C./WTVR-TV Richmond/SurveyUSA	February 15–17	51%	45%	6	554 RV	±4.2%
WDBJ-TV Roanoke/WJLA-TV Washington, D.C./SurveyUSA	January 16–17	40%	52%	12	535 RV	±4.3%
Rasmussen Reports/Pulse Opinion Research	January 3	43%	45%	2	500 LV	±4.5%
WDBJ-TV Roanoke/WJLA-TV Washington, D.C./SurveyUSA	December 13–15, 2007	44%	50%	6	546 RV	±4.3%
WDBJ-TV Roanoke/WJLA-TV Washington, D.C./SurveyUSA	November 9–11, 2007	41%	51%	10	542 RV	±4.3%
SurveyUSA	March 9–11, 2007	40%	51%	11	Not reported	Not reported
SurveyUSA	February 9–11, 2007	41%	53%	12	Not reported	Not reported
WDBJ-TV Roanoke/SurveyUSA	January 12–14, 2007	36%	57%	21	510 RV	±4.4%

Four-way race

Poll Source	Date administered (2008)	Barack Obama	John McCain	Bob Barr	Ralph Nader	Margin	Sample size	Margin of error
CNN/Time/Opinion Research Corporation	October 11–14	50%	41%	3%	4%	9	698 LV	±3.5%
CNN/Time/Opinion Research Corporation	September 28–30	52%	42%	2%	2%	10	684 LV	±4%
Zogby Interactive	August 15–19	43%	41%	5%	1%	2	632 LV	±3.9%
Zogby Interactive	June 11–30	44%	39%	5%	1%	5	1,261 LV	±2.8%

Five-way race

Poll Source	Date administered (2008)	Barack Obama	John McCain	Bob Barr	Ralph Nader	Cynthia McKinney	Margin	Sample size	Margin of error
Fox News/Rasmussen Reports/Pulse Opinion Research	November 2	51%	47%	0%	0%	0%	4	1,000 LV	±3%
Fox News/Rasmussen Reports/Pulse Opinion Research	October 26	51%	47%	0%	0%	0%	4	1,000 LV	±3%
Fox News/Rasmussen Reports/Pulse Opinion Research	October 12	50%	47%	1%	0%	0%	3	1,000 LV	±3%
Fox News/Rasmussen Reports/Pulse Opinion Research	October 5	50%	48%	1%	0%	0%	2	1,000 LV	±3%
Fox News/Rasmussen Reports/Pulse Opinion Research	September 28	50%	47%	0%	1%	1%	3	500 LV	±4.5%
Fox News/Rasmussen Reports/Pulse Opinion Research	September 21	48%	50%	1%	0%	0%	2	500 LV	±4.5%
Fox News/Rasmussen Reports/Pulse Opinion Research	September 14	48%	48%	0%	1%	0%	Tied	500 LV	±4.5%
Fox News/Rasmussen Reports/Pulse Opinion Research	September 7	47%	49%	1%	1%	0%	2	500 LV	±4.5%

Six-way race

Poll Source	Date administered (2008)	Barack Obama	John McCain	Bob Barr	Ralph Nader	Cynthia McKinney	Chuck Baldwin	Margin	Sample size	Margin of error
Associated Press/Roper/GfK Group	October 22–26	49%	42%	0%	1%	1%	0%	7	601 LV	±4.0%
Suffolk University	October 3–5	51%	39%	0%	0%	0%	0%	12	600 LV	±4%

=== Washington ===
11 electoral votes
(Democrat in 2000 & 2004)

Poll Source	Date administered (2008)	Barack Obama	John McCain	Margin	Sample size	Margin of error
KATU-TV Portland/KING-TV Seattle/SurveyUSA	October 30 – November 2	56%	40%	16	663 LV	±3.9%
Polimetrix/YouGov	October 18 – November 1	53%	43%	10	797 RV	Not reported
University of Washington/Pacific Market Research	October 27–31	51%	39%	12	387 RV	±5.0%
KATU-TV Portland/KING-TV Seattle/SurveyUSA	October 26–27	56%	39%	17	630 LV	±4%
University of Washington/Pacific Market Research	October 18–26	55%	34%	21	600 RV	±4.0%
Rasmussen Reports/Pulse Opinion Research	October 22	54%	43%	11	500 LV	±4.5%
Elway Research	October 16–19	55%	36%	19	405 RV	±5%
KATU-TV Portland/KING-TV Seattle/SurveyUSA	October 12–13	56%	40%	16	544 LV	±4.3%
Rasmussen Reports/Pulse Opinion Research	October 2	53%	43%	10	700 LV	±4%
KATU-TV Portland/KING-TV Seattle/SurveyUSA	September 21–22	54%	43%	11	682 LV	±3.8%
American Research Group	September 16–18	50%	44%	6	600 LV	±4%
Rasmussen Reports/Pulse Opinion Research	September 10	49%	47%	2	500 LV	±4.5%
Elway Research	September 6–8	46%	37%	9	225 RV	±6.5%
KATU-TV Portland/KING-TV Seattle/SurveyUSA	September 5–7	49%	45%	4	658 LV	±3.9%
KATU-TV Portland/KING-TV Seattle/SurveyUSA	August 11–12	51%	44%	7	718 LV	±3.7%
Rasmussen Reports/Pulse Opinion Research	August 6	54%	42%	12	500 LV	±4.5%
Elway Research	July 27–31	47%	35%	12	405 RV	±5%
KATU-TV Portland/KING-TV Seattle/SurveyUSA	July 13–15	55%	39%	16	666 LV	±3.9%
Moore Information (R)	July 9–10	47%	37%	10	400 RV	±5%
Rasmussen Reports/Pulse Opinion Research	July 9	51%	43%	8	500 LV	±4.5%
Strategies 360	June 26	47%	39%	8	1,200 RV	±2.75%
KATU-TV Portland/KING-TV Seattle/SurveyUSA	June 17–19	55%	40%	15	532 LV	±4.3%
Rasmussen Reports/Pulse Opinion Research	June 9	53%	35%	18	500 LV	±4.5%
KATU-TV Portland/KING-TV Seattle/SurveyUSA	June 7–9	56%	39%	17	637 RV	±3.9%
Elway Research	May 21–25	44%	38%	6	405 RV	±5%
KATU-TV Portland/KING-TV Seattle/SurveyUSA	May 16–18	52%	36%	16	600 RV	±4.1%
KING-TV Seattle/SurveyUSA	May 12	54%	42%	12	659 LV	±3.9%
Rasmussen Reports/Pulse Opinion Research	May 12	51%	40%	11	500 LV	±4.5%
KATU-TV Portland/KING-TV Seattle/SurveyUSA	April 14–16	53%	40%	13	634 LV	±4%
KING-TV Seattle/SurveyUSA	April 7	51%	44%	7	607 RV	±4.1%
Rasmussen Reports/Pulse Opinion Research	March 27	48%	43%	5	500 LV	±4.5%
Elway Research	March 18–20	45%	39%	6	405 RV	Not reported
KATU-TV Portland/KING-TV Seattle/SurveyUSA	March 14–16	52%	41%	11	510 RV	±4.4%
Rasmussen Reports/Pulse Opinion Research	February 28	44%	45%	1	500 LV	±4.5%
SurveyUSA	February 26–28	52%	38%	14	634 RV	±4%
KING-TV Seattle/SurveyUSA	February 3–4	55%	38%	17	534 RV	±4.3%
KATU-TV Portland/KING-TV Seattle/SurveyUSA	January 11–13	52%	43%	9	527 RV	±4.4%
KATU-TV Portland/KING-TV Seattle/SurveyUSA	December 13–15, 2007	50%	43%	7	513 RV	±4.4%
KATU-TV Portland/KING-TV Seattle/SurveyUSA	November 9–11, 2007	45%	46%	1	517 RV	±4.4%
SurveyUSA	March 9–11, 2007	50%	41%	9	Not reported	Not reported
SurveyUSA	February 9–11, 2007	46%	46%	Tied	Not reported	Not reported
KATU-TV Portland/KING-TV Seattle/SurveyUSA	January 12–14, 2007	47%	46%	1	521 RV	±4.4%

Four-way race

Poll Source	Date administered (2008)	Barack Obama	John McCain	Bob Barr	Ralph Nader	Margin	Sample size	Margin of error
Zogby Interactive	June 11–30	48%	35%	5%	2%	13	1,373 LV	±2.7%

=== West Virginia ===
5 electoral votes
(Republican in 2000 & 2004)

Poll Source	Date administered (2008)	Barack Obama	John McCain	Margin	Sample size	Margin of error
American Research Group	October 31 – November 3	42%	53%	11	600 LV	±4%
Polimetrix/YouGov	October 18 – November 1	43%	52%	9	404 RV	Not reported
Public Policy Polling	October 29–30	42%	55%	13	2,128 LV	±2.1%
Reuters/Zogby International	October 23–26	40.4%	50.3%	9.9	600 LV	±4.1%
West Virginia Wesleyan College/The State Journal/Orion Strategies	October 20–21	43.5%	49.2%	5.7	600 LV	±4%
CNN/Time/Opinion Research Corporation	October 19–21	44%	53%	9	674 LV	±4%
Rasmussen Reports/Pulse Opinion Research	October 20	43%	52%	9	500 LV	±4.5%
NBC News/Mason-Dixon Polling & Research	October 16–17	41%	47%	6	625 LV	±4%
Public Policy Polling	October 16–17	42%	50%	8	1,223 LV	±2.8%
Rainmaker Media Group	October 14–15	41.3%	41.7%	0.4	600 RV	Not reported
Poll Position/InsiderAdvantage	October 13	47%	49%	2	522 LV	±4%
American Research Group	October 4–8	50%	42%	8	600 LV	±4%
Rasmussen Reports/Pulse Opinion Research	September 24	42%	50%	8	500 LV	±4.5%
CNN/Time/Opinion Research Corporation	September 21–23	46%	50%	4	694 LV	±3.5%
West Virginia Wesleyan College/The State Journal/Orion Strategies	September 21–22	40.7%	51.7%	11	600 LV	±4
American Research Group	September 14–16	45%	49%	4	600 LV	±4%
Mark Blankenship Enterprises	September 5–8	39%	44%	5	432 RV	±4.7%
Rasmussen Reports/Pulse Opinion Research	June 2	35%	47%	12	500 LV	±4.5%
SurveyUSA	February 26–28	35%	53%	18	617 RV	±4%

Four-way race

Poll Source	Date administered (2008)	Barack Obama	John McCain	Ralph Nader	Cynthia McKinney	Margin	Sample size	Margin of error
CNN/Opinion Research Corporation	October 19–21	41%	53%	2%	1%	12	674 LV	±4%

=== Wisconsin ===
10 electoral votes
(Democrat in 2000 & 2004)

Poll Source	Date administered (2008)	Barack Obama	John McCain	Margin	Sample size	Margin of error
Polimetrix/YouGov	October 18 – November 1	53%	41%	12	976 RV	Not reported
KSTP-TV Minneapolis/WDIO-TV Duluth/WGBA-TV Green Bay/SurveyUSA	October 28–29	55%	39%	16	667 LV	±3.9%
University of Wisconsin (Badger Poll)	October 21–28	52%	42%	10	359 LV	±5.2%
Rasmussen Reports/Pulse Opinion Research	October 23	51%	44%	7	500 LV	±4.5%
Big Ten	October 19–22	52.9%	40.5%	12.4	584 LV	±4.2%
Allstate/National Journal/Financial Dynamics	October 16–20	53%	40%	13	405 RV	±4.5%
KSTP-TV Minneapolis/WDIO-TV Duluth/WGBA-TV Green Bay/SurveyUSA	October 18–19	51%	43%	8	641 LV	±3.9%
NBC News/Mason-Dixon Polling & Research	October 16–17	51%	39%	12	625 LV	±4%
Wisconsin Public Radio/St. Norbert College	October 9–17	51%	38%	13	400 LV	±5%
University of Wisconsin Milwaukee	October 8–15	51.4%	36.3%	15.1	391 LV	±5.0%
Washington Post/Wall Street Journal/Quinnipiac University	October 8–12	54%	37%	17	1,201 LV	±2.8%
Washington Post/Wall Street Journal/Quinnipiac University	October 3–7	51%	43%	8	1,081 LV	±3%
Rasmussen Reports/Pulse Opinion Research	October 6	54%	44%	10	700 LV	±4%
KSTP-TV Minneapolis/WDIO-TV Duluth/WGBA-TV Green Bay/SurveyUSA	October 5–6	52%	42%	10	672 LV	±3.9%
CNN/Time/Opinion Research Corporation	October 3–6	51%	46%	5	859 LV	±3.5%
American Research Group	September 18–21	50%	45%	5	600 LV	±4%
Washington Post/Wall Street Journal/Quinnipiac University	September 14–21	49%	42%	7	1,313 LV	±2.7%
Big Ten	September 14–17	45.2%	44.3%	0.9	616 RV	±4%
CNN/Time/Opinion Research Corporation	September 14–16	50%	47%	3	950 RV	±3%
Rasmussen Reports/Pulse Opinion Research	September 15	48%	46%	2	700 LV	±4%
Rasmussen Reports/Pulse Opinion Research	August 5	51%	44%	7	500 LV	±4.5%
Wisconsin Policy Research Institute	August 3–4	44%	38%	6	600 LV	±4%
Washington Post/Wall Street Journal/Quinnipiac University	July 14–22	50%	39%	11	1,094 LV	±3%
Rasmussen Reports/Pulse Opinion Research	July 8	50%	39%	11	500 LV	±4.5%
Washington Post/Wall Street Journal/Quinnipiac University	June 17–24	52%	39%	13	1,537 LV	±2.5%
KSTP-TV Minneapolis/WDIO-TV Duluth/SurveyUSA	June 13–16	52%	43%	9	538 LV	±4.3%
WisPolitics.com/University of Wisconsin	June 8–10	50%	37%	13	506 LV	±4.5%
Rasmussen Reports/Pulse Opinion Research	June 5	45%	43%	2	500 LV	±4.5%
KSTP-TV Minneapolis/WDIO-TV Duluth/SurveyUSA	May 16–18	48%	42%	6	600 RV	±4.1%
Rasmussen Reports/Pulse Opinion Research	May 5	43%	47%	4	500 LV	±4.5%
University of Wisconsin (Badger Poll)	April 15–24	47%	43%	4	345 LV	±5.3%
KSTP-TV Minneapolis/WDIO-TV Duluth/SurveyUSA	April 11–13	49%	44%	5	541 LV	±4.3%
Wisconsin Public Radio/St. Norbert College	March 25 – April 5	46%	42%	4	400 A	±5%
Rasmussen Reports/Pulse Opinion Research	March 26	46%	48%	2	500 LV	±4.5%
KSTP-TV Minneapolis/WDIO-TV Duluth/SurveyUSA	March 14–16	48%	44%	4	528 RV	±4.4%
SurveyUSA	February 26–28	51%	40%	11	597 RV	±4.1%
Rasmussen Reports/Pulse Opinion Research	February 21	44%	43%	1	500 LV	±4.5%
KSTP-TV Minneapolis/WDIO-TV Duluth/SurveyUSA	February 15–17	52%	42%	10	537 RV	±4.3%
KSTP-TV Minneapolis/WDIO-TV Duluth/SurveyUSA	January 20–21	44%	46%	2	532 RV	±4.3%
KSTP-TV Minneapolis/WDIO-TV Duluth/SurveyUSA	December 13–15, 2007	46%	44%	2	543 RV	±4.3%
KSTP-TV Minneapolis/WDIO-TV Duluth/SurveyUSA	November 9–11, 2007	43%	47%	4	528 RV	±4.4%
SurveyUSA	March 9–11, 2007	41%	47%	6	Not reported	Not reported
SurveyUSA	February 9–11, 2007	48%	42%	6	Not reported	Not reported
WDIO-TV Duluth/SurveyUSA	January 12–14, 2007	44%	44%	Tied	498 RV	±4.5%

Four-way race

Poll Source	Date administered (2008)	Barack Obama	John McCain	Bob Barr	Ralph Nader	Margin	Sample size	Margin of error
Zogby Interactive	June 11–30	48%	38%	4%	1%	10	861 LV	±3.4%

=== Wyoming ===
3 electoral votes
(Republican in 2000 & 2004)

Poll Source	Date administered (2008)	Barack Obama	John McCain	Margin	Sample size	Margin of error
Polimetrix/YouGov	October 18 – November 1	29%	67%	38	246 RV	Not reported
Roll Call/Capitol Hill/SurveyUSA	October 18–19	37%	58%	21	604 LV	±4%
Rasmussen Reports/Pulse Opinion Research	September 10	39%	58%	19	500 LV	±4%
Las Vegas Review-Journal/Mason-Dixon Polling & Research	August 13–15	25%	62%	37	400 LV	±5%
SurveyUSA	February 26–28	35%	54%	19	576 RV	±4.2%

== See also ==
- Nationwide opinion polling for the Democratic Party 2008 presidential candidates
- Nationwide opinion polling for the Republican Party 2008 presidential candidates
- Nationwide opinion polling for the 2008 United States presidential election
- Statewide opinion polling for Hillary Clinton for the 2008 United States presidential election
- Statewide opinion polling for the 2008 Democratic Party presidential primaries
- Statewide opinion polling for the 2008 Republican Party presidential primaries

== Election Day projection ==
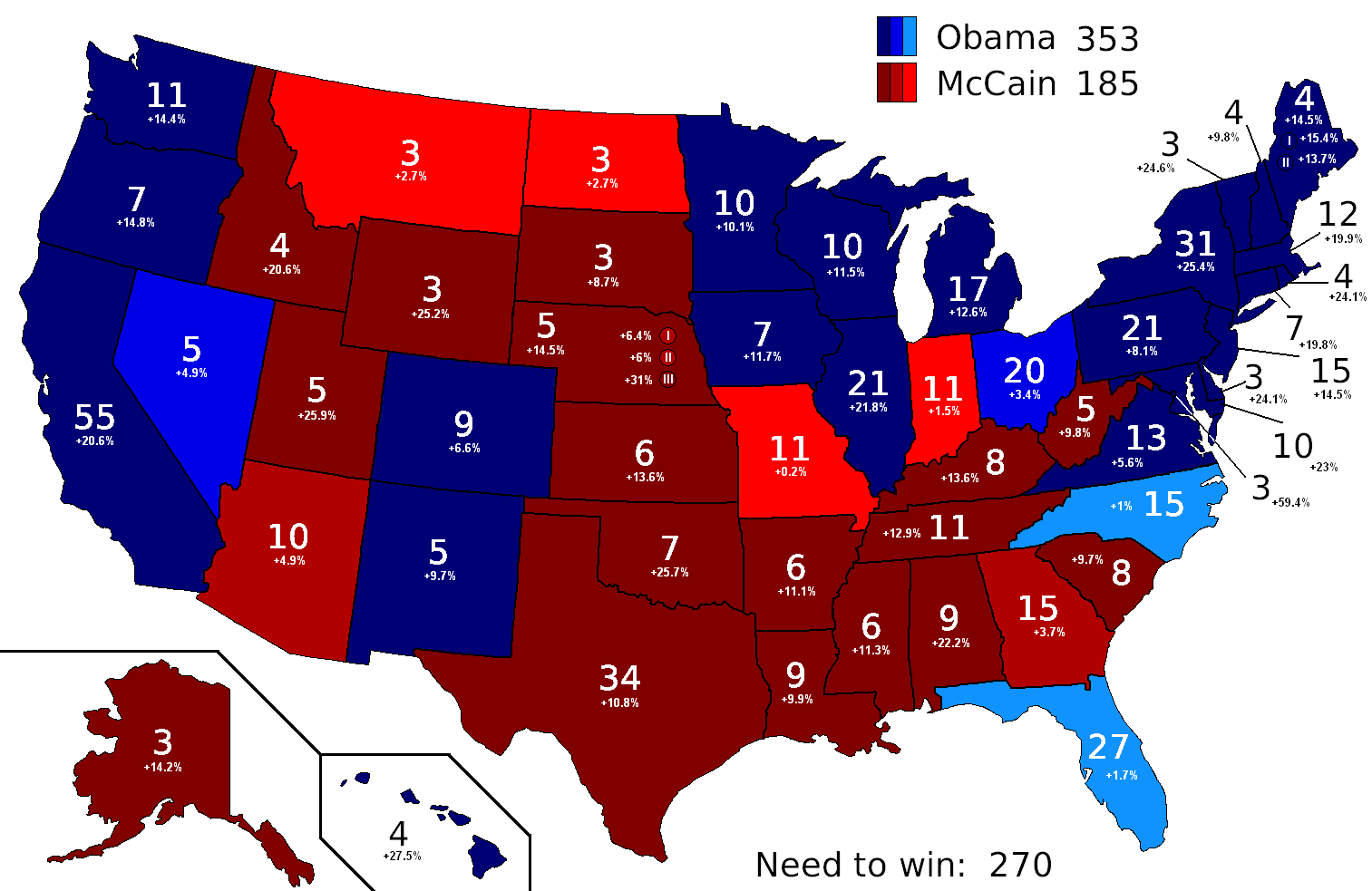

FINAL UPDATE: 22:32, November 4, 2008 (UTC)

- Data derived from Nate Silver's FiveThirtyEight.com weighted averages and statistical polling analysis, which determines what the best guess as to what will happen on Election Day is rather than what would happen if the election were held today. (Methodology)
- Each state is colored according to which candidate is currently projected to win, and both the state's total electoral votes and the winning candidate's projected margin of victory are listed.
- The actual result matches this map with the exceptions that Obama won Indiana and Nebraska's second congressional district.
