= ARG =

Arg or ARG may refer to:

== Places ==
- Arg (ارگ) means "citadel" in Persian, and may refer to:
  - Arg, Iran, a village in Fars Province, Iran
  - Arg, Kabul, presidential palace in Kabul, Afghanistan
  - Arg, South Khorasan, a village in South Khorasan Province, Iran
  - Arg of Karim Khan
  - Arg of Tabriz
  - Arg-é Bam, an ancient citadel in Bam, Iran
  - Arg-e Rayen, Kerman, Iran
  - Herat Citadel, also known as Arg-e Herat
- ARG, the ISO 3166-1 alpha-3 and UNDP country code for Argentina

== People ==
- James Argent, nicknamed "Arg"

== Arts, entertainment, and media ==
- Alternate reality game
- American Record Guide, a classical music magazine
- Archive for Reformation History, journal
- Arg!, a mod for the 1998 video game Half-Life

== Mathematics ==
- Argument (complex analysis), the angular component of a complex number or function
- Argument of a function, a specific input in a mathematical function

== Military ==
- A US Navy hull classification symbol: Internal combustion engine repair ship (ARG)
- Amphibious ready group of US Navy

== Organizations and enterprises ==
- Aerolíneas Argentinas (ICAO: ARG)
- American Research Group, US polling research firm
- Architectural Resources Group, a firm based in San Francisco, US
- Architectural Research Group, Philadelphia, US, 1932–35
- Austin Rover Group, 1980s UK carmaker

== Transportation ==
- ARG Argentina Línea Privada, 2001–02, at other times airline LAPA (Líneas Aéreas Privadas Argentinas)
- Arisaig railway station, UK, National Rail code
- Australian Railroad Group, a former rail freight operator

== Other uses ==
- Antigua Recreation Ground, the national stadium of Antigua and Barbuda
- Former Argentine gold and silver pesos, ISO 4217 code
- Arginine, an α-amino acid abbreviated as Arg or R
- Aragonese language, ISO 639 alpha-3 code arg

== See also ==
- Argh (disambiguation)
