= Argh =

Argh!, Aargh!, Aaargh! or variants may refer to:

- Argh!, an onomatopoeic way of expressing frustration
- Aaargh!, a 1987 video game
- Aaagh!, a 2006 album by Republic of Loose
- ARGH Power Ratings, a sports rating system often associated with NCAA football and basketball.
- ARGH, another name for the small G protein RhoG – an important component of cell signalling networks.
- AARGH (Artists Against Rampant Government Homophobia)

== See also ==
- AAH (disambiguation)
- ARG
