= AH-2 =

AH-2, AH2, or variation, may refer to:

== Military ==
- Denel AH-2, a former designation of the Rooivalk attack helicopter
- Kawasaki AH-2, a proposed attack helicopter derived from Kawasaki OH-1
- AH-2 Sabre, Brazilian designation for the Mil Mi-35M4 helicopter gunship
- USS Solace (AH-2), a US Navy hospital ship

== Other uses ==
- AH2, road from Indonesia to Iran
- AH 2, Hijri year 2, lasting 7 July 623 – 26 June 624 in the Georgian calendar
- AH_{2} (biochemistry); see electron acceptor
- (8201) 1994 AH_{2}, a near-earth asteroid

== See also ==
- Ah2 Music (composing team)
- AH (disambiguation)
- AHH (disambiguation)
- AHAH (AJAX computer programming)
