= Statewide opinion polling for the March 2012 Republican Party presidential primaries =

Republican presidential primaries, 2012
- Early – Mid 2012
- Leading Republican 2012 primary candidate by state (parentheses indicate a shared lead, italics indicates polling data, non-italics indicates a primary win). Stars indicate a completed primary. States in gray have no polling data or no relevant data due to a leading candidate having withdrawn or declined to enter the race. Mitt Romney 37+5 Rick Santorum 11 Newt Gingrich 2
Republican nominee before election
John McCain
Republican
Presumptive Republican nominee
Mitt Romney
Republican

This article contains opinion polling by U.S. state for the 2012 Republican Party presidential primaries.

As of May 2012, both Ron Paul and Mitt Romney have led polls in multiple states. They have both also reached at least 20 percent in polls in multiple states. Before announcing that they would not run, Mike Huckabee and Sarah Palin were also leading polls in multiple states with numbers above 20 percent. Michele Bachmann, Herman Cain, Rick Perry, and Rick Santorum were also able to lead polls in multiple states earlier in the race, but Cain suspended his campaign on December 3 after multiple allegations of sexual impropriety, Bachmann dropped out on January 4, one day after her poor showing in the Iowa caucuses, in which she came in sixth place and received just 5 percent of the vote, Perry dropped out on January 19 after finishing fifth in Iowa with just over 10 percent of the vote, finishing sixth in New Hampshire with less than 1 percent of the vote and with "lagging" poll numbers ahead of the South Carolina primary, and Santorum suspended his campaign on April 10. Newt Gingrich announced he would drop out of the race after a poor showing in the northeast on April 24.

Haley Barbour of Mississippi, Jeb Bush of Florida, Chris Christie of New Jersey, Jim DeMint of South Carolina, Bobby Jindal of Louisiana, Tim Pawlenty of Minnesota, Paul Ryan of Wisconsin and John Thune of South Dakota all succeeded in leading polls in their home states at some point in 2011, although only Pawlenty actually launched a campaign. Pawlenty exited the race on August 14, one day after finishing third in Iowa's Ames Straw Poll, citing a lack of campaign funds.

== Polling for completed primaries ==
=== Washington (March 3) ===
Winner: Mitt Romney
Caucus date: March 3, 2012
Delegates: 43

Poll source	Date	1st	2nd	3rd	Other
Caucus results Turnout: 50,764	March 3, 2012	Mitt Romney 37.65%	Ron Paul; 24.81%	Rick Santorum; 23.81%	Newt Gingrich 10.28%, Others 3.44%
SurveyUSA Margin of error: ±4.5% Sample size: 500	Feb. 29 – Mar. 1, 2012	Mitt Romney; 38%	Rick Santorum; 24%	Ron Paul; 14%	Newt Gingrich 10%, Barack Obama 6%, Other 3%, Undecided 6%
Public Policy Polling Margin of error: ±4.6% Sample size: 447	Feb. 29 – Mar. 1, 2012	Mitt Romney; 37%	Rick Santorum; 32%	Ron Paul; 16%	Newt Gingrich 13%, Someone else/Not sure 2%
Public Policy Polling Margin of error: ±4.9% Sample size: 400	Feb. 16–19, 2012	Rick Santorum; 38%	Mitt Romney; 27%	Ron Paul; 15%	Newt Gingrich 12%, Someone else/Not sure 8%
Public Policy Polling Margin of error: ±4.9% Sample size: 400	Feb. 16–19, 2012	Rick Santorum; 49%	Mitt Romney; 28%	Ron Paul; 16%	Not sure 7%
SurveyUSA Margin of error: ±7.7% Sample size: 169	Jan. 16, 2012	Mitt Romney; 26%	Newt Gingrich; 22%	Rick Santorum; 19%	Ron Paul 7%, Rick Perry 5%, Jon Huntsman, Jr. 2%, Undecided 18%
Public Policy Polling Margin of error: ±3.7% Sample size: 712	Oct. 29–31, 2010	Sarah Palin; 19%	Mitt Romney; 18%	Mike Huckabee; 17%	Newt Gingrich 15%, Tim Pawlenty 4%, Mitch Daniels 2%, Mike Pence 1%, John Thune 0%, someone else/undecided 24%

=== Alaska (March 6) ===
Winner: Mitt Romney
Caucus date: March 6, 2012
Delegates: 27

Poll source	Date	1st	2nd	3rd	Other
Caucus results Turnout: 13,219	March 6, 2012	Mitt Romney 32.4%	Rick Santorum; 29.2%	Ron Paul; 24.0%	Newt Gingrich 14.1%, Uncommitted 0.3%
Public Policy Polling; Margin of error: ±3.6% Sample size: 743	Oct. 30–31, 2010	Mike Huckabee; 17%	Newt Gingrich; 16%	Mitt Romney; 16%	Sarah Palin 15%, Tim Pawlenty 5%, Mitch Daniels 2%, Mike Pence 2%, John Thune 2%, someone else/undecided 25%
Public Policy Polling; Margin of error: ±3.5% Sample size: 805	Aug. 27–28, 2010	Mitt Romney; 20%	Mike Huckabee; 17%	Sarah Palin; 17%	Newt Gingrich 16%, Ron Paul 10%, someone else 9%, undecided 11%

=== Georgia (March 6) ===
Winner: Newt Gingrich
Primary date: March 6, 2012
Delegates: 76

Poll source	Date	1st	2nd	3rd	Other
Primary results Turnout: 900,434	March 6, 2012	Newt Gingrich 47.2%	Mitt Romney; 25.9%	Rick Santorum; 19.6%	Ron Paul 6.6%, Jon Huntsman, Jr. 0.2%, Michele Bachmann 0.2%, Rick Perry 0.2%, Buddy Roemer 0.1%, Gary Johnson 0.1%
American Research Group Margin of error: ±4% Sample size: 600	Mar. 3–5, 2012	Newt Gingrich; 44%	Mitt Romney; 24%	Rick Santorum; 19%	Ron Paul 9%, Undecided 3%
Public Policy Polling Margin of error: ±3.6% Sample size: 728	Mar. 3–4, 2012	Newt Gingrich; 47%	Mitt Romney; 24%	Rick Santorum; 19%	Ron Paul 8%, Someone else/Not sure 2%
Public Policy Polling Margin of error: ±3.6% Sample size: 728	Mar. 3–4, 2012	Mitt Romney; 38%	Rick Santorum; 37%	Ron Paul; 14%	Not sure 10%
CNN/ORC Margin of error: ±4% Sample size: 527	Mar. 1–4, 2012	Newt Gingrich; 47%	Mitt Romney; 24%	Rick Santorum; 15%	Ron Paul 9%, None/No one 1%, No opinion 4%
Mason-Dixon Margin of error: ±4% Sample size: 625	Feb. 29-Mar. 1, 2012	Newt Gingrich; 38%	Mitt Romney; 24%	Rick Santorum; 22%	Ron Paul 3%, Undecided 12%
Rosetta Stone Margin of error: ±3% Sample size: 950	Mar. 1, 2012	Newt Gingrich; 42%	Mitt Romney; 22%	Rick Santorum; 16%	Ron Paul 5%, Undecided 15%
YouGov Margin of error: ±6.3% Sample size: 500	Feb. 25 – Mar. 1, 2012	Newt Gingrich; 32%	Mitt Romney; 27%	Rick Santorum; 17%	Ron Paul 10%, Not sure 14%
Landmark/Rosetta Stone Margin of error: ±4% Sample size: 1,300	Feb. 23, 2012	Newt Gingrich; 38%	Rick Santorum; 25%	Mitt Romney; 19%	Ron Paul 5%, Undecided 13%
Rasmussen Reports Margin of error: ±4% Sample size: 750	Feb. 22, 2012	Newt Gingrich; 33%	Rick Santorum; 28%	Mitt Romney; 20%	Ron Paul 9%, Someone else 2%, Undecided 8%
InsiderAdvantage/Majority Opinion Research Margin of error: ±3.6% Sample size: 721	Feb. 20, 2012	Newt Gingrich; 25.9%	Mitt Romney; 23.9%	Rick Santorum; 22.8%	Ron Paul 11.7%, Someone else 4.4%, No opinion 11.3%
Rosetta Stone Communications/Landmark Communications Margin of error: ±2.6% Sample size: 1,475	Feb. 9, 2012	Newt Gingrich; 35%	Rick Santorum; 26%	Mitt Romney; 16%	Ron Paul 5%, Undecided 18%
Survey USA Margin of error: ±4.7% Sample size: 459	Feb. 1–2, 2012	Newt Gingrich; 45%	Mitt Romney; 32%	Rick Santorum; 9%	Ron Paul 8%, Undecided 4%, Other 2%
Mason-Dixon Margin of error: ±4% Sample size: 1,025	Dec. 12–14, 2011	Newt Gingrich; 43%	Mitt Romney; 21%	Rick Perry; 7%	Ron Paul 4%, Michele Bachmann 3%, Jon Huntsman 2%, Rick Santorum 1%, Undecided 19%
InsiderAdvantage/Majority Opinion Research Margin of error: Sample size: 516	Dec. 9, 2011	Newt Gingrich; 54.1%	Mitt Romney; 12.4%	Ron Paul; 5.5%	Michele Bachmann 3.8%, Rick Perry 2.9%, Rick Santorum 1.7%, Jon Huntsman 1.5%, Someone else 0.7%, No opinion 17.4%
SurveyUSA Margin of error: ±4.7% Sample size: 362	Dec. 6–7, 2011	Newt Gingrich; 65%	Mitt Romney; 12%	Michele Bachmann; 5%	Ron Paul 5%, Rick Perry 4%, Jon Huntsman 1%, Rick Santorum 1%, Undecided 6%
InsiderAdvantage Margin of error: ±3% Sample size: 678	Oct. 3, 2011	Herman Cain; 41%	Newt Gingrich; 17%	Mitt Romney; 10%	Rick Perry 9%, Ron Paul 5%, Michele Bachmann 1%, Jon Huntsman 1%, Other 4%, No opinion/Undecided 12%
InsiderAdvantage Margin of error: ±5% Sample size: 425	Aug. 18, 2011	Rick Perry; 24%	Herman Cain; 15%	Newt Gingrich; 9%	Michele Bachmann 8%, Sarah Palin 8%, Mitt Romney 6%, Ron Paul 5%, Jon Huntsman 1%, Other 4%, No opinion/Undecided 20%
Insider-Advantage-WSB-TV Margin of error: ±5% Sample size: 407	Jun. 3, 2011	Herman Cain; 26%	Michele Bachmann; 13%	Newt Gingrich; 12%	Sarah Palin 11%, Mitt Romney 10%, Ron Paul 1%, Tim Pawlenty 1%, Other 4%, Undecided 22%
Public Policy Polling Margin of error: ±4.9% Sample size: 400	Mar. 31 – Apr. 3, 2011	Mike Huckabee; 23%	Newt Gingrich; 22%	Herman Cain; 16%	Sarah Palin 10%, Mitt Romney 8%, Michele Bachmann 4%, Ron Paul 3%, Tim Pawlenty 3%, someone else/undecided 11%
Public Policy Polling Margin of error: ±4.9% Sample size: 400	Mar. 31 – Apr. 3, 2011	Newt Gingrich; 31%	Mike Huckabee; 24%	Sarah Palin; 10%	Mitt Romney 8%, Michele Bachmann 5%, Ron Paul 4%, Tim Pawlenty 4%, Haley Barbour 3%, someone else/undecided 11%
Magellan Strategies Margin of error: ±2.8% Sample size: 1,227	Jul. 8, 2010	Newt Gingrich; 29.8%	Mike Huckabee; 24.5%	Mitt Romney; 14.4%	Sarah Palin 12.0%, Haley Barbour 4.7%, Tim Pawlenty 2.7%, undecided 11.9%
Public Policy Polling Margin of error: ±4.3% Sample size: 516	Feb. 26–28, 2010	Mike Huckabee 38%	Mitt Romney; 28%	Sarah Palin; 25%	undecided 9%

=== Massachusetts (March 6) ===
Winner: Mitt Romney
Primary date: March 6, 2012
Delegates: 41

Poll source	Date	1st	2nd	3rd	Other
Primary results Turnout: 367,438	March 6, 2012	Mitt Romney 72.2%	Rick Santorum; 12.0%	Ron Paul; 9.5%	Newt Gingrich 4.6%, Jon Huntsman, Jr. 0.6%, No Preference 0.5%, Rick Perry 0.3%, Michele Bachmann 0.2%
YouGov Margin of error: ±8.7% Sample size: 400	Feb. 25 – Mar. 1, 2012	Mitt Romney; 56%	Rick Santorum; 16%	Newt Gingrich; 5%	Ron Paul 5%, Not sure 17%
Suffolk University Margin of error: ±% Sample size: 172	Feb. 11–15, 2012	Mitt Romney; 64%	Rick Santorum; 16%	Ron Paul; 7%	Newt Gingrich 6%, Undecided 6%, Refused 1%
Public Policy Polling Margin of error: ±6.1% Sample size: 255	Sep. 16–18, 2011	Mitt Romney; 50%	Rick Perry; 14%	Michele Bachmann; 7%	Herman Cain 5%, Newt Gingrich 5%, Ron Paul 5%, Jon Huntsman 3%, Gary Johnson 1%, Rick Santorum 1%, someone else/not sure 10%
Public Policy Polling Margin of error: ±6.1% Sample size: 255	Sep. 16–18, 2011	Mitt Romney; 63%	Rick Perry; 26%	–	not sure 10%
Public Policy Polling Margin of error: ±6.3% Sample size: 244	Jun. 2 – Jun. 5, 2011	Mitt Romney; 49%	Michele Bachmann; 10%	Sarah Palin; 9%	Herman Cain 8%, Tim Pawlenty 6%, Ron Paul 5%, Newt Gingrich 4%, Jon Huntsman 1%, Someone else/not sure 9%
Public Policy Polling Margin of error: ±5.7% Sample size: 300	Nov. 29 – Dec. 1, 2010	Mitt Romney; 47%	Sarah Palin; 12%	Newt Gingrich; 11%	Mike Huckabee 10%, Tim Pawlenty 4%, Ron Paul 3%, John Thune 2%, Mitch Daniels 1%, someone else/undecided 9%

=== Ohio (March 6) ===
Winner: Mitt Romney
Primary date: March 6, 2012
Delegates: 66

Poll source	Date	1st	2nd	3rd	Other
Primary results Turnout: 1,203,403	March 6, 2012	Mitt Romney 37.9%	Rick Santorum; 37.1%	Newt Gingrich; 14.6%	Ron Paul 9.2%, Rick Perry 0.6%, Jon Huntsman, Jr. 0.5%
Merriman River Group Margin of error: ±3.4% Sample size: 832 LV	Mar. 4, 2012	Mitt Romney; 38%	Rick Santorum; 33%	Newt Gingrich; 18%	Ron Paul 8%, Unsure 1%
Rasmussen Reports Margin of error: ±4.4% Sample size: 750	Mar. 4, 2012	Rick Santorum; 32%	Mitt Romney; 31%	Newt Gingrich; 13%	Ron Paul 13%, Undecided 6%
Suffolk University Margin of error: ±4.4% Sample size: 500	Mar. 3–4, 2012	Rick Santorum; 37%	Mitt Romney; 33%	Newt Gingrich; 16%	Ron Paul 8%, Undecided 6%
American Research Group Margin of error: ±4% Sample size: 600	Mar. 3–4, 2012	Mitt Romney; 35%	Rick Santorum; 28%	Newt Gingrich; 18%	Ron Paul 13%, Other 1%, Undecided 5%
Public Policy Polling Margin of error: ±3.8% Sample size: 666	Mar. 3–4, 2012	Mitt Romney; 37%	Rick Santorum; 36%	Newt Gingrich; 15%	Ron Paul 11%, Someone else/Not sure 2%
Public Policy Polling Margin of error: ±3.8% Sample size: 666	Mar. 3–4, 2012	Rick Santorum; 40%	Mitt Romney; 39%	Ron Paul; 14%	Not sure 8%
Quinnipiac Margin of error: ±3.6% Sample size: 753	Mar. 2–4, 2012	Mitt Romney; 34%	Rick Santorum; 31%	Newt Gingrich; 15%	Ron Paul 12%, None/No one 2%, No opinion 8%
CNN/ORC Margin of error: ±4% Sample size: 546	Mar. 1–4, 2012	Mitt Romney; 32%	Rick Santorum; 32%	Newt Gingrich; 14%	Ron Paul 11%, None/No one 2%, No opinion 8%
Reuters/Ipsos Margin of error: ±4% Sample size: 917	Mar. 1–3, 2012	Mitt Romney; 32%	Rick Santorum; 32%	Newt Gingrich; 17%	Ron Paul 6%
NBC News/Marist Margin of error: ±3.4% Sample size: 820	Feb. 29 – Mar. 2, 2012	Rick Santorum; 34%	Mitt Romney; 32%	Newt Gingrich; 15%	Ron Paul 13%, Other 1%, Undecided 6%
Rasmussen Reports Margin of error: ±4% Sample size: 750	Mar. 1, 2012	Rick Santorum; 33%	Mitt Romney; 31%	Newt Gingrich; 15%	Ron Paul 11%, Other 2%, Undecided 8%
Quinnipiac Margin of error: ±4.3% Sample size: 517	Feb. 29 – Mar. 1, 2012	Rick Santorum; 35%	Mitt Romney; 31%	Newt Gingrich; 17%	Ron Paul 12%, Don't know/No answer 6%
YouGov Margin of error: ±5.3% Sample size: 650	Feb. 25 – Mar. 1, 2012	Rick Santorum; 33%	Mitt Romney; 27%	Newt Gingrich; 12%	Ron Paul 9%, Not sure 19%
Quinnipiac Margin of error: ±3.4% Sample size: 847	Feb. 23–26, 2012	Rick Santorum; 36%	Mitt Romney; 29%	Newt Gingrich; 17%	Ron Paul 11%, Don't know/No answer 6%
Rasmussen Reports Margin of error: ±4.2% Sample size: 750	Feb. 15, 2012	Rick Santorum; 42%	Mitt Romney; 24%	Newt Gingrich; 13%	Ron Paul 10%, Other 3%, Undecided 8%
Quinnipiac Margin of error: ±4.2% Sample size: 1,421	Feb. 7–12, 2012	Rick Santorum; 36%	Mitt Romney; 29%	Newt Gingrich; 20%	Ron Paul; 9%
Public Policy Polling Margin of error: ±3.9% Sample size: 626	Jan. 28–29, 2012	Newt Gingrich; 26%	Mitt Romney; 25%	Rick Santorum; 22%	Ron Paul 11%, Someone else/Not sure 16%
Public Policy Polling Margin of error: ±3.9% Sample size: 626	Jan. 28–29, 2012	Newt Gingrich; 42%	Mitt Romney; 39%	–	Not sure 19%
Public Policy Polling Margin of error: ±3.9% Sample size: 626	Jan. 28–29, 2012	Mitt Romney; 61%	Ron Paul; 23%	–	Not sure 16%
Public Policy Polling Margin of error: ±3.9% Sample size: 626	Jan. 28–29, 2012	Rick Santorum; 45%	Mitt Romney; 38%	–	Not sure 18%
Quinnipiac Margin of error: ±4.2% Sample size: 542	Jan. 9–16, 2012	Mitt Romney; 27%	Rick Santorum; 18%	Newt Gingrich; 17%	Ron Paul 10%, Rick Perry 4%, Someone Else 1%, Wouldn't Vote 2%, Don't Know/No Answer 20%
Quinnipiac Margin of error: ±4.4% Sample size: 500	Nov. 28 – Dec. 5, 2011	Newt Gingrich; 36%	Mitt Romney; 18%	Herman Cain; 7%	Ron Paul 7%, Michele Bachmann 5%, Rick Perry 4%, Rick Santorum 2%, Jon Huntsman 1%, Someone Else 2%, Wouldn't Vote 2%, Don't Know/No Answer 15%
Quinnipiac Margin of error: ±4.4% Sample size: 500	Nov. 28 – Dec. 5, 2011	Newt Gingrich; 55%	Mitt Romney; 28%	–	Someone Else 3%, Wouldn't Vote 3%, Don't Know/No Answer 13%
Quinnipiac University Margin of error: ±4.7% Sample size: 443	Oct. 31 – Nov. 7, 2011	Herman Cain; 25%	Mitt Romney; 20%	Newt Gingrich; 11%	Ron Paul 9%, Michele Bachmann 4%, Rick Perry 4%, Jon Huntsman 2%, Rick Santorum 1%, Unknown 20%
Public Policy Polling Margin of error: ±4.4% Sample size: 500	Nov. 4–6, 2011	Herman Cain; 34%	Newt Gingrich; 20%	Mitt Romney; 19%	Ron Paul 5%, Rick Perry 5%, Michele Bachmann 4%, Jon Huntsman 2%, Gary Johnson 1%, Rick Santorum 1%, someone else/not sure 9%
Quinnipiac Margin of error: ±4.2% Sample size: 542	Oct. 17–23, 2011	Herman Cain; 28%	Mitt Romney; 23%	Ron Paul; 8%	Newt Gingrich 7%, Michele Bachmann 4%, Rick Perry 4%, Jon Huntsman 2%, Rick Santorum 1%, don't know 18%, someone else 2%, wouldn't vote 2%
Quinnipiac Margin of error: ±4.2% Sample size: 542	Oct. 17–23, 2011	Herman Cain; 40%	Mitt Romney; 33%	Rick Perry; 10%	don't know 14%, wouldn't vote 2%, someone else 1%
Public Policy Polling Margin of error: ±4.4% Sample size: 500	Oct. 13–16, 2011	Herman Cain; 34%	Mitt Romney; 19%	Newt Gingrich; 14%	Ron Paul 7%, Michele Bachmann 6%, Rick Perry 5%, Jon Huntsman 1%, Rick Santorum 1%, Gary Johnson 0%, someone else/not sure 12%
Public Policy Polling Margin of error: ±4.4% Sample size: 500	Oct. 13–16, 2011	Mitt Romney; 50%	Rick Perry; 35%	–	not sure 15%
Public Policy Polling Margin of error: ±4.4% Sample size: 500	Oct. 13–16, 2011	Herman Cain; 50%	Mitt Romney; 36%	–	not sure 13%
Public Policy Polling Margin of error: ±4.4% Sample size: 500	Oct. 13–16, 2011	Herman Cain; 58%	Rick Perry; 24%	–	not sure 18%
Quinnipiac Margin of error: ±4.8% Sample size: 423	Sep. 20–25, 2011	Mitt Romney; 24%	Rick Perry; 20%	Sarah Palin; 9%	Herman Cain 7%, Ron Paul 6%, Newt Gingrich 4%, Rick Santorum 4%, Michele Bachmann 3%, Jon Huntsman 1%, don't know 21%, someone else 1%, wouldn't vote 1%
Quinnipiac Margin of error: ±4.8% Sample size: 423	Sep. 20–25, 2011	Mitt Romney; 25%	Rick Perry; 21%	Herman Cain; 7%	Newt Gingrich 6%, Ron Paul 6%, Michele Bachmann 4%, Rick Santorum 4%, Jon Huntsman 2%, don't know 22%, someone else 1%, wouldn't vote 1%
Public Policy Polling Margin of error: ±4.9% Sample size: 400	Aug. 11–14, 2011	Rick Perry; 21%	Mitt Romney; 18%	Sarah Palin; 11%	Michele Bachmann 10%, Herman Cain 8%, Newt Gingrich 7%, Ron Paul 7%, Tim Pawlenty 3%, Jon Huntsman 1%, someone else/undecided 15%
Public Policy Polling Margin of error: ±4.9% Sample size: 400	Aug. 11–14, 2011	Rick Perry; 21%	Mitt Romney; 20%	Michele Bachmann; 14%	Herman Cain 10%, Newt Gingrich 8%, Ron Paul 8%, Tim Pawlenty 3%, Jon Huntsman 1%, someone else/undecided 16%
Quinnipiac Margin of error: ±4.1% Sample size: 563	Jul. 12–18, 2011	Mitt Romney; 16%	Sarah Palin; 15%	Michele Bachmann; 11%	Rick Perry 8%, Herman Cain 6%, Ron Paul 5%, Newt Gingrich 4%, Tim Pawlenty 3%, Rick Santorum 2%, Jon Huntsman 1%, Thaddeus McCotter 0%, someone else/not sure 28%
Quinnipiac Margin of error: ±4.1% Sample size: 563	Jul. 12–18, 2011	Mitt Romney; 19%	Sarah Palin; 15%	Michele Bachmann; 14%	Herman Cain 7%, Newt Gingrich 5%, Ron Paul 5%, Tim Pawlenty 3%, Rick Santorum 2%, Jon Huntsman 1%, Thaddeus McCotter 0%, someone else/not sure 29%
Quinnipiac Margin of error: ±4.1% Sample size: 563	Jul. 12–18, 2011	Mitt Romney; 19%	Michele Bachmann; 16%	Rick Perry; 8%	Herman Cain 7%, Newt Gingrich 6%, Ron Paul 6%, Tim Pawlenty 3%, Rick Santorum 3%, Jon Huntsman 1%, Thaddeus McCotter 0%, someone else/not sure 31%
Public Policy Polling Margin of error: ±4.9% Sample size: 400	May 19–22, 2011	Mitt Romney; 21%	Sarah Palin; 16%	Herman Cain; 12%	Newt Gingrich 12%, Michele Bachmann 10%, Ron Paul 9%, Tim Pawlenty 5%, someone else/not sure 15%
Public Policy Polling Margin of error: ±4.9% Sample size: 400	May 19–22, 2011	Mitt Romney; 23%	Newt Gingrich; 16%	Herman Cain; 13%	Ron Paul 13%, Michele Bachmann 11%, Tim Pawlenty 6%, Jon Huntsman 0%, someone else/not sure 18%
Public Policy Polling Margin of error: ±4.9% Sample size: 400	Mar. 10–13, 2011	Mike Huckabee; 19%	Mitt Romney; 18%	Newt Gingrich; 16%	Sarah Palin 15%, Ron Paul 7%, Tim Pawlenty 5%, Mitch Daniels 4%, Haley Barbour 2%, someone else/undecided 13%
Public Policy Polling Margin of error: ±4.9% Sample size: 400	Dec. 10–12, 2010	Sarah Palin; 21%	Mike Huckabee; 19%	Newt Gingrich; 18%	Mitt Romney 15%, Ron Paul 6%, Mitch Daniels 5%, Tim Pawlenty 3%, John Thune 2%, someone else/undecided 11%
Public Policy Polling Margin of error: ±4.4% Sample size: 500	Oct. 28–30, 2010	Sarah Palin; 20%	Newt Gingrich; 19%	Mike Huckabee; 17%	Mitt Romney 14%, Tim Pawlenty 6%, Mitch Daniels 3%, Mike Pence 2%, John Thune 0%, someone else/undecided 18%
Public Policy Polling Margin of error: ±4.9% Sample size: 400	Mar. 20–21, 2010	Mitt Romney; 32%	Mike Huckabee; 28%	Sarah Palin; 26%	undecided 14%

=== Oklahoma (March 6) ===
Winner: Rick Santorum
Primary date: March 6, 2012
Delegates: 43

Poll source	Date	1st	2nd	3rd	Other
Primary results Turnout: 286,298	March 6, 2012	Rick Santorum 33.8%	Mitt Romney; 28.0%	Newt Gingrich; 27.5%	Ron Paul 9.6%, Rick Perry 0.5%, Michele Bachmann 0.3%, Jon Huntsman, Jr. 0.3%
American Research Group Margin of error: ±4% Sample size: 600	Mar. 1–2, 2012	Rick Santorum; 37%	Mitt Romney; 26%	Newt Gingrich; 22%	Ron Paul 9%, Other 1%, Undecided 5%
YouGov Margin of error: ±8.8% Sample size: 250	Feb. 25 – Mar. 1, 2012	Rick Santorum; 28%	Mitt Romney; 25%	Newt Gingrich; 20%	Ron Paul 8%, Not sure 19%
Rasmussen Reports Margin of error: ±4% Sample size: 750	Feb. 21, 2012	Rick Santorum; 43%	Newt Gingrich; 22%	Mitt Romney; 18%	Ron Paul 7%, Some other candidate 2%, Undecided 7%
SoonerPoll.com Margin of error: ±5.66% Sample size: 278	Feb. 8–16, 2012	Rick Santorum; 39%	Mitt Romney; 23%	Newt Gingrich; 18%	Ron Paul 8%, Don't know/refused 13%
American Research Group Margin of error: ±4% Sample size: 600	Feb. 6–7, 2012	Newt Gingrich; 34%	Mitt Romney; 31%	Rick Santorum; 16%	Ron Paul 10%, Other 2%, Undecided 7%
SoonerPoll.com Margin of error: ±4.9% Sample size: 400	Nov. 17–Dec. 16, 2011	Newt Gingrich; 33.3%	Mitt Romney; 14.3%	Herman Cain; 9.3%	Rick Perry 9.3%, Ron Paul 4.3%, Michele Bachmann 3.5%, Rick Santorum 1.5%, Jon Huntsman 1.3%
Cole Hargrave Snodgrass & Associates Margin of error: ±6.7% Sample size: 215	Aug. 9–11, 2011	Rick Perry; 22%	Mitt Romney; 17%	Michele Bachmann; 8%	Herman Cain 6%, Newt Gingrich 5%, Ron Paul 3%, Jon Huntsman 2%, Tim Pawlenty 2%, Undecided (vol.) 33%

=== Tennessee (March 6) ===
Winner: Rick Santorum
Primary date: March 6, 2012
Delegates: 58

Poll source	Date	1st	2nd	3rd	Other
Primary results Turnout: 551,792	March 6, 2012	Rick Santorum 37.2%	Mitt Romney; 28.1%	Newt Gingrich; 23.9%	Ron Paul 9.0%, Uncommitted 0.6%, Rick Perry 0.4%, Michele Bachmann 0.3%, Jon Huntsman, Jr. 0.2%, Buddy Roemer 0.2%, Gary Johnson 0.1%
We Ask America Margin of error: ±3.06% Sample size: 1,023 LV	Mar. 4, 2012	Mitt Romney; 30%	Newt Gingrich; 29%	Rick Santorum; 29%	Ron Paul 12%
Public Policy Polling Margin of error: ±4.3% Sample size: 525	Mar. 3–4, 2012	Rick Santorum; 34%	Mitt Romney; 29%	Newt Gingrich; 27%	Ron Paul 8%, Someone else/Not sure 2%
Public Policy Polling Margin of error: ±4.3% Sample size: 525	Mar. 3–4, 2012	Rick Santorum; 47%	Mitt Romney; 34%	Ron Paul; 11%	Not sure 7%
Rasmussen Reports Margin of error: ±4% Sample size: 750	Mar. 3, 2012	Rick Santorum; 34%	Mitt Romney; 30%	Newt Gingrich; 18%	Ron Paul 8%, Other 3%, Undecided 7%
American Research Group Margin of error: ±4% Sample size: 600	Mar. 1–3, 2012	Rick Santorum; 35%	Mitt Romney; 31%	Newt Gingrich; 20%	Ron Paul 9%, Other 1%, Undecided 4%
YouGov Margin of error: ±6.6% Sample size: 500	Feb. 25 – Mar. 1, 2012	Rick Santorum; 32%	Mitt Romney; 23%	Newt Gingrich; 16%	Ron Paul 13%, Not sure 15%
Middle Tennessee State University Margin of error: ±4% Sample size: 646	Feb. 13–25, 2012	Rick Santorum; 40%	Mitt Romney; 19%	Newt Gingrich; 13%	Ron Paul 11%
Vanderbilt University Margin of error: ±2.6% Sample size: 815	Feb. 16–22, 2012	Rick Santorum; 33%	Mitt Romney; 17%	Ron Paul; 13%	Newt Gingrich 10%, None of the above 10%, Would not vote 0%, Don't know 14%, Refused 3%
American Research Group Margin of error: ±4% Sample size: 600	Feb. 8–9, 2012	Rick Santorum; 34%	Mitt Romney; 27%	Newt Gingrich; 16%	Ron Paul 13%, Other 1%, Undecided 9%
Vanderbilt Margin of error: ±2.6% Sample size: 1,423	Oct. 28 – Nov. 5, 2011	Herman Cain; 19%	Mitt Romney; 11%	Rick Perry; 8%	Michele Bachmann 6%, Newt Gingrich 6%, Ron Paul 6%, Rick Santorum 1%, don't know 28%, would rather have another choice 13%, declined to answer 2%
Public Policy Polling Margin of error: ±4.9% Sample size: 400	Feb. 9–13, 2011	Mike Huckabee; 31%	Sarah Palin; 17%	Newt Gingrich; 11%	Mitt Romney 11%, Ron Paul 10%, Mitch Daniels 3%, Tim Pawlenty 3%, John Thune 1%, undecided 14%

=== Vermont (March 6) ===
Winner: Mitt Romney
Primary date: March 6, 2012
Delegates: 17

Poll source	Date	1st	2nd	3rd	Other
Primary results Turnout: 60,304	March 6, 2012	Mitt Romney 39.7%	Ron Paul; 25.5%	Rick Santorum; 23.7%	Newt Gingrich 8.2%, Jon Huntsman, Jr. 2.0%, Rick Perry 0.9%
Castleton Polling Institute Margin of error: Sample size: 231	Feb. 11–22, 2012	Mitt Romney; 34%	Rick Santorum; 27%	Ron Paul; 14%	Newt Gingrich 10%, Jon Huntsman 1%, Other 1%, Not sure 4%, Refused 9%
Public Policy Polling Margin of error: ±5.1% Sample size: 366	Jul. 28–31, 2011	Mitt Romney; 26%	Michele Bachmann; 16%	Sarah Palin; 16%	Rick Perry 10%, Herman Cain 9%, Ron Paul 7%, Newt Gingrich 6%, Jon Huntsman 3%, Tim Pawlenty 1%, someone else/undecided 5%
Public Policy Polling Margin of error: ±5.1% Sample size: 366	Jul. 28–31, 2011	Mitt Romney; 29%	Michele Bachmann; 21%	Rick Perry; 11%	Herman Cain 10%, Newt Gingrich 9%, Ron Paul 8%, Tim Pawlenty 2%, Jon Huntsman 1%, someone else/undecided 9%

=== Virginia (March 6) ===
Winner: Mitt Romney
Primary date: March 6, 2012
Delegates: 50
Note: Only Mitt Romney and Ron Paul appeared on the ballot. Other candidates failed to submit the necessary 10,000 signatures.

Poll source	Date	1st	2nd	3rd	Other
Primary results Turnout: 265,521	March 6, 2012	Mitt Romney 59.5%	Ron Paul; 40.5%		
NBC News/Marist Margin of error: ±4.3% Sample size: 529	Feb. 29 – Mar. 2, 2012	Mitt Romney; 69%	Ron Paul; 26%	–	Undecided 6%
NBC News/Marist Margin of error: ±4.3% Sample size: 529	Feb. 29 – Mar. 2, 2012	Mitt Romney; 36%	Rick Santorum; 28%	Newt Gingrich 15%	Ron Paul 13%, Undecided 8%
Roanoke College Margin of error: ±5% Sample size: 377	Feb. 13–28, 2012	Mitt Romney; 56%	Ron Paul; 21%	–	Undecided 23%
Roanoke College Margin of error: ±5% Sample size: 377	Feb. 13–28, 2012	Mitt Romney; 31%	Rick Santorum; 27%	Newt Gingrich 13%	Ron Paul 12%, Uncertain 17%
Christopher Newport University/Richmond Times-Dispatch Margin of error: ±3.1% Sample size: 1,018	Feb. 4–13, 2012	Mitt Romney; 53%	Ron Paul; 23%	–	Other/Undecided 12%, Don't know/refused 12%
Quinnipiac University Margin of error: ±4.2% Sample size: 546	Feb. 1–6, 2012	Mitt Romney; 68%	Ron Paul; 19%	–	Don't know/No answer 13%
Quinnipiac University Margin of error: ±4.2% Sample size: 546	Feb. 1–6, 2012	Mitt Romney; 37%	Newt Gingrich; 27%	Rick Santorum 18%	Ron Paul 12%, Wouldn't vote 1%, Don't know/No answer 5%
Quinnipiac University Margin of error: ±4.4% Sample size: 489	Dec. 13–19, 2011	Newt Gingrich; 30%	Mitt Romney; 25%	Ron Paul; 9%	Rick Perry 6%, Michele Bachmann 6%, Jon Huntsman 4%, Rick Santorum 3%, other 1%, wouldn't vote 1%, don't know 15%
Public Policy Polling Margin of error: ±5.2% Sample size: 350	Dec. 11–13, 2011	Newt Gingrich; 41%	Mitt Romney; 15%	Michele Bachmann; 8%	Rick Perry 8%, Ron Paul 6%, Rick Santorum 6%, Jon Huntsman 3%, Gary Johnson 1%, Someone else/Not sure 12%
Quinnipiac Margin of error: ±5.3% Sample size: 345	Oct. 5–9, 2011	Herman Cain; 21%	Mitt Romney; 21%	Rick Perry; 11%	Ron Paul 9%, Michele Bachmann 7%, Newt Gingrich 7%, Rick Santorum 2%, Jon Huntsman 1%, Wouldn't vote 1%, Don't know 20%
Christopher Newport University/Richmond Times-Dispatch Margin of error: ±5.4% Sample size: 1,027	Oct. 3–8, 2011	Mitt Romney; 44%	Herman Cain; 12%	Rick Perry; 10%	Ron Paul 6%, Newt Gingrich 5%, Michele Bachmann 4%, Rick Santorum 2%, Jon Huntsman 1%, Other 2%, Don't know 14%
Quinnipiac Margin of error: ±4% Sample size: 591	Sep. 7–12, 2011	Rick Perry; 25%	Mitt Romney; 19%	Ron Paul; 8%	Sarah Palin 7%, Herman Cain 6%, Michele Bachmann 5%, Newt Gingrich 4%, Rick Santorum 2%, Jon Huntsman 1%, Thaddeus McCotter 0%, someone else/undecided 21%
Public Policy Polling Margin of error: ±4.9% Sample size: 400	Jul. 21–24, 2011	Rick Perry; 20%	Mitt Romney; 16%	Michele Bachmann; 15%	Sarah Palin 13%, Herman Cain 10%, Newt Gingrich 6%, Ron Paul 6%, Tim Pawlenty 2%, Jon Huntsman 1%, someone else/not sure 11%
Public Policy Polling Margin of error: ±4.9% Sample size: 400	Jul. 21–24, 2011	Michele Bachmann; 21%	Rick Perry; 18%	Mitt Romney; 18%	Herman Cain 10%, Newt Gingrich 8%, Ron Paul 7%, Tim Pawlenty 3%, Jon Huntsman 2%, someone else/not sure 13%
Public Policy Polling Margin of error: ±4.9% Sample size: 400	Feb. 24–27, 2011	Mike Huckabee; 20%	Mitt Romney; 16%	Sarah Palin; 16%	Newt Gingrich 14%, Ron Paul 8%, Mitch Daniels 7%, Tim Pawlenty 4%, Haley Barbour 2%, someone else/undecided 11%
Public Policy Polling Margin of error: ±4.9% Sample size: 400	Nov. 10–13, 2010	Mike Huckabee; 21%	Newt Gingrich; 20%	Sarah Palin; 17%	Mitt Romney 15%, Ron Paul 7%, Tim Pawlenty 5%, Mitch Daniels 3%, John Thune 2%, someone else/undecided 11%

=== Alabama (March 13) ===
Winner: Rick Santorum
Primary date: March 13, 2012
Delegates: 50

Poll source	Date	1st	2nd	3rd	Other
Primary results Turnout: 621,542	March 13, 2012	Rick Santorum 34.5%	Newt Gingrich; 29.3%	Mitt Romney; 29.0%	Ron Paul 5.0%, Uncommitted 1.5%, Rick Perry 0.3%, Michele Bachmann 0.3%, Jon Huntsman, Jr. 0.2%
Public Policy Polling; Margin of error: ±4.0% Sample size: 600	Mar. 10–11, 2012	Mitt Romney; 31%	Newt Gingrich; 30%	Rick Santorum; 29%	Ron Paul 8%
American Research Group; Margin of error: ±4% Sample size: 600	Mar. 9–11, 2012	Newt Gingrich; 34%	Mitt Romney; 31%	Rick Santorum; 24%	Ron Paul 6%, Other 1%, Undecided 4%
Alabama State University; Margin of error: ±5% Sample size: 416	Mar. 5–9, 2012	Newt Gingrich; 20.7%	Mitt Romney; 20.2%	Rick Santorum; 16.7%	Other 15.1%, Undecided 27.4%
Rasmussen Reports; Margin of error: ±4% Sample size: 750	Mar. 8, 2012	Newt Gingrich; 30%	Rick Santorum; 29%	Mitt Romney; 28%	Ron Paul 7%, Other 1%, Undecided 6%
Capital Survey Research Center; Margin of error: ±4% Sample size: 554	Mar. 6–8, 2012	Mitt Romney; 28.5%	Newt Gingrich; 25.5%	Rick Santorum; 21.1%	Ron Paul 4.5%, Don't know 20%
Capital Survey Research Center; Margin of error: ±4% Sample size: 592	Mar. 5–7, 2012	Mitt Romney; 29.9%	Newt Gingrich; 24.7%	Rick Santorum; 20.1%	Ron Paul 5.6%, Don't know/No reply 19.8%
Capital Survey Research Center; Margin of error: ±4.4% Sample size: 510	Mar. 1, 5–6, 2012	Mitt Romney; 31.2%	Rick Santorum; 21.6%	Newt Gingrich; 21%	Ron Paul 6.5%, Undecided 19.8%
Alabama State University; Sample size: 470	Mar. 1, 2012	Rick Santorum; 22.7%	Mitt Romney; 18.7%	Newt Gingrich; 13.8%	Other 15%, Undecided 29.8%
Capital Research Survey Center; Sample size: 616	Nov. 29 – Dec. 1, 2011	Newt Gingrich; 43%	Mitt Romney; 14%	Herman Cain; 10%	Rick Perry 4%, Ron Paul 3.5%, Michele Bachmann 3%, Jon Huntsman 1%, Rick Santorum 1%, Undecided 20%
Capital Research Survey Center; Sample size: 841	Aug. 2011	Rick Perry; 30%	Mitt Romney; 24%	Michele Bachmann; 11%	Ron Paul 7%, Herman Cain 7%, Newt Gingrich 5%, Jon Huntsman 1%, Rick Santorum 1%, Undecided 14%
Public Policy Polling; Margin of error: ±4.6% Sample size: 457	Mar. 27–29, 2010	Mike Huckabee; 41%	Sarah Palin; 27%	Mitt Romney; 20%	Undecided 13%
Public Strategy Associates; Margin of error: ±3.1% Sample size: 1,007	Feb. 3–4, 2010	Mike Huckabee; 33%	Sarah Palin; 23%	Mitt Romney; 12%	Ron Paul 5%, Tim Pawlenty 3%, Undecided 24%

=== Hawaii (March 13) ===
Winner: Mitt Romney
Caucus date: March 13, 2012
Delegates: 20

Poll source	Date	1st	2nd	3rd	Other
Caucus results Turnout: 10,228	March 13, 2012	Mitt Romney 44.5%	Rick Santorum; 25.3%	Ron Paul; 19.3%	Newt Gingrich 10.9%
Public Policy Polling Margin of error: ±5.7% Sample size: 293	Oct. 13–16, 2011	Herman Cain; 36%	Mitt Romney; 24%	Newt Gingrich; 8%	Rick Perry 8%, Michele Bachmann 6%, Ron Paul 4%, Jon Huntsman 1%, Gary Johnson 1%, Rick Santorum 1%, someone else/not sure 11%
Public Policy Polling Margin of error: ±5.7% Sample size: 293	Oct. 13–16, 2011	Mitt Romney; 49%	Rick Perry; 30%	–	not sure 21%
Public Policy Polling Margin of error: ±5.7% Sample size: 293	Oct. 13–16, 2011	Herman Cain; 49%	Mitt Romney; 34%	–	not sure 17%
Public Policy Polling Margin of error: ±5.7% Sample size: 293	Oct. 13–16, 2011	Herman Cain; 54%	Rick Perry; 22%	–	not sure 24%

=== Mississippi (March 13) ===
Winner: Rick Santorum
Primary date: March 13, 2012
Delegates: 40

Poll source	Date	1st	2nd	3rd	Other
Primary results Turnout: 289,935	March 13, 2012	Rick Santorum; 32.8%	Newt Gingrich 31.2%	Mitt Romney 30.6%	Ron Paul 4.4%, Rick Perry 0.5%, Michele Bachmann 0.3%, Jon Huntsman 0.1%, Gary Johnson 0.1%
Public Policy Polling; Margin of error: ±3.8% Sample size: 656	Mar. 10–11, 2012	Newt Gingrich; 33%	Mitt Romney; 31%	Rick Santorum; 27%	Ron Paul 7%, Undecided 4%
American Research Group; Margin of error: ±4% Sample size: 600	Mar. 10–11, 2012	Mitt Romney; 34%	Newt Gingrich; 32%	Rick Santorum; 22%	Ron Paul 8%, Other 1%, Undecided 3%
Rasmussen Reports; Margin of error: ±4% Sample size: 750	Mar. 8, 2012	Mitt Romney; 35%	Newt Gingrich; 27%	Rick Santorum; 27%	Ron Paul 6%, Other 1%, Undecided 4%
American Research Group Margin of error: ±4% Sample size: 600	Mar. 7–8, 2012	Newt Gingrich; 35%	Mitt Romney; 31%	Rick Santorum; 20%	Ron Paul 7%, Undecided 7%
Public Policy Polling Margin of error: ±4.9% Sample size: 400	Nov. 4–6, 2011	Newt Gingrich; 28%	Herman Cain; 25%	Rick Perry; 14%	Mitt Romney 12%, Michele Bachmann 5%, Ron Paul 4%, Jon Huntsman 1%, Gary Johnson 1%, Rick Santorum 1%, someone else/not sure 9%
Public Policy Polling Margin of error: ±4.9% Sample size: 400	Mar. 24–27, 2011	Haley Barbour; 37%	Mike Huckabee; 19%	Newt Gingrich; 10%	Sarah Palin 10%, Mitt Romney 6%, Michele Bachmann 5%, Tim Pawlenty 3%, Ron Paul 2%, someone else/undecided 9%
Public Policy Polling Margin of error: ±4.9% Sample size: 400	Mar. 24–27, 2011	Mike Huckabee; 35%	Sarah Palin; 20%	Newt Gingrich; 18%	Mitt Romney 8%, Michele Bachmann 5%, Ron Paul 4%, Tim Pawlenty 3%, someone else/undecided 8%

=== Illinois (March 20) ===
Winner: Mitt Romney
Primary date: March 20, 2012
Delegates: 69

Poll source	Date	1st	2nd	3rd	Other
Primary results Turnout: 922,146	March 20, 2012	Mitt Romney 46.7%	Rick Santorum; 35.0%	Ron Paul; 9.3%	Newt Gingrich 8.0%, Rick Perry 0.6%
American Research Group Margin of error: ±4% Sample size: 600	Mar. 17–18, 2012	Mitt Romney; 44%	Rick Santorum; 30%	Newt Gingrich; 13%	Ron Paul 8%, Other 1%, Undecided 4%
Public Policy Polling Margin of error: ±4.4% Sample size: 506	Mar. 17–18, 2012	Mitt Romney; 45%	Rick Santorum; 30%	Newt Gingrich; 13%	Ron Paul 10%, Someone else/Not sure 2%
Public Policy Polling Margin of error: ±4.4% Sample size: 506	Mar. 17–18, 2012	Mitt Romney; 45%	Rick Santorum; 34%	Ron Paul; 14%	Not sure 7%
Rasmussen Reports Margin of error: ±4% Sample size: 750	Mar. 15, 2012	Mitt Romney; 41%	Rick Santorum; 32%	Newt Gingrich; 14%	Ron Paul 7%, Undecided 6%
Chicago Tribune Margin of error: ±4% Sample size: 600	Mar. 7–9, 2012	Mitt Romney; 35%	Rick Santorum; 31%	Newt Gingrich; 12%	Ron Paul 7%, Undecided 16%
The Simon Poll/SIU Margin of error: ±3.0% Sample size: 1000	Oct. 11–16, 2011	Herman Cain; 23.4%	Mitt Romney; 20.6%	Newt Gingrich; 7.5%	Rick Perry 7.2%, Ron Paul 6.6%, Michele Bachmann 3.8%, Jon Huntsman 2.5%, Rick Santorum 2.2%
Public Policy Polling Margin of error: ±6.1% Sample size: 255	Oct. 30–31, 2010	Mike Huckabee; 18%	Newt Gingrich; 17%	Sarah Palin; 14%	Mitt Romney 12%, Tim Pawlenty 7%, Mitch Daniels 6%, John Thune 2%, Mike Pence 1%, someone else/undecided 23%
Public Policy Polling Margin of error: ±4.9% Sample size: 400	Aug. 14–16, 2010	Newt Gingrich; 23%	Mike Huckabee; 21%	Sarah Palin; 18%	Mitt Romney 16%, Ron Paul 7%, undecided 9%, someone else 7%
Public Policy Polling Margin of error: ±4.9% Sample size: 400	Jun. 12–13, 2010	Mike Huckabee; 25%	Mitt Romney; 25%	Newt Gingrich; 23%	Sarah Palin 18%, Ron Paul 5%, undecided 4%
Public Policy Polling Margin of error: ±4.9% Sample size: 400	Apr. 1–5, 2010	Mitt Romney; 34%	Mike Huckabee; 28%	Sarah Palin; 24%	undecided 14%

=== Missouri (March 15–24) ===
Caucus date: March 17, 2012
Delegates: 52

Poll source	Date	1st	2nd	3rd	Other
Non-binding Primary Turnout: 251,868	Feb. 7, 2012	Rick Santorum; 55.2%	Mitt Romney; 25.3%	Ron Paul; 12.2%	Uncommitted 3.9%, Rick Perry 1.0%, Herman Cain 0.9%, Michele Bachmann 0.7%, Jon Huntsman, Jr. 0.4%, Gary Johnson 0.2%, Michael Meehan 0.1%, Keith Drummond 0.1%
Public Policy Polling Margin of error: ±3.2% Sample size: 958	Feb. 6, 2012	Rick Santorum; 45%	Mitt Romney; 32%	Ron Paul; 19%	Someone else 4%
Public Policy Polling Margin of error: ±4.1% Sample size: 574	Jan. 27–29, 2012	Newt Gingrich; 30%	Rick Santorum; 28%	Mitt Romney; 24%	Ron Paul 11%, Someone else/Not sure 7%
Public Policy Polling Margin of error: ±4.1% Sample size: 574	Jan. 27–29, 2012	Rick Santorum; 45%	Mitt Romney; 34%	Ron Paul; 13%	Someone else/Not sure 8%
Public Policy Polling Margin of error: ±4.1% Sample size: 574	Jan. 27–29, 2012	Newt Gingrich; 43%	Mitt Romney; 42%		Not sure 15%
Public Policy Polling Margin of error: ±4.1% Sample size: 574	Jan. 27–29, 2012	Mitt Romney; 60%	Ron Paul; 27%		Not sure 13%
Public Policy Polling Margin of error: ±4.1% Sample size: 574	Jan. 27–29, 2012	Rick Santorum; 50%	Mitt Romney; 37%		Not sure 13%
Public Policy Polling Margin of error: ±4.9% Sample size: 400	Sep. 9–12, 2011	Rick Perry; 31%	Mitt Romney; 15%	Herman Cain; 10%	Newt Gingrich 10%, Michele Bachmann 9%, Ron Paul 8%, Jon Huntsman 2%, Rick Santorum 1%, someone else/not sure 14%
Public Policy Polling Margin of error: ±4.9% Sample size: 400	Sep. 9–12, 2011	Rick Perry; 55%	Mitt Romney 27%	not sure 19%	
Wilson Perkins Allen Opinion Research Margin of error: ±5.8% Sample size: 284	Aug. 10–11, 2011	Mitt Romney; 25%	Rick Perry; 22%	Michele Bachmann; 13%	Newt Gingrich 7%, Herman Cain 6%, Ron Paul 5%, Rick Santorum 2%, Jon Huntsman 1%, Hard Undecided/DK/Refused DNR 20%
Public Policy Polling Margin of error: ±4.9% Sample size: 400	Apr. 28 – May 1, 2011	Mike Huckabee; 28%	Mitt Romney; 13%	Donald Trump; 12%	Newt Gingrich 10%, Michele Bachmann 9%, Sarah Palin 8%, Ron Paul 6%, Tim Pawlenty 5%, someone else/undecided 9%
Public Policy Polling Margin of error: ±4.9% Sample size: 400	Mar. 3–6, 2011	Mike Huckabee; 29%	Newt Gingrich; 19%	Sarah Palin; 14%	Mitt Romney 13%, Ron Paul 7%, Mitch Daniels 4%, Tim Pawlenty 3%, Haley Barbour 2%, someone else/undecided 10%
Public Policy Polling Margin of error: ±4.9% Sample size: 400	Nov. 29 – Dec. 1, 2010	Mike Huckabee; 27%	Sarah Palin; 25%	Newt Gingrich; 15%	Mitt Romney 14%, Ron Paul 5%, Tim Pawlenty 3%, John Thune 2%, Mitch Daniels 1%, undecided 9%
Public Policy Polling Margin of error: ±4.9% Sample size: 400	Mar. 27–29, 2010	Mike Huckabee; 32%	Sarah Palin; 28%	Mitt Romney; 22%	undecided 18%

=== Louisiana (March 24) ===
Winner: Rick Santorum
Primary date: March 24, 2012
Delegates: 46

Poll source	Date	1st	2nd	3rd	Other
Primary results Turnout: 186,377	March 24, 2012	Rick Santorum 49.0%	Mitt Romney; 26.7%	Newt Gingrich; 15.91%	Ron Paul 6.15%
Public Policy Polling Margin of error: ±3.8% Sample size: 650	Mar. 21–22, 2012	Rick Santorum; 42%	Mitt Romney; 28%	Newt Gingrich; 18%	Ron Paul 8%, Buddy Roemer 2%, Someone else/Not sure 2%
Public Policy Polling Margin of error: ±3.8% Sample size: 650	Mar. 21–22, 2012	Rick Santorum; 53%	Mitt Romney; 31%	Ron Paul; 11%	Not sure 6%
American Research Group Margin of error: ±4% Sample size: 600	Mar. 20–22, 2012	Rick Santorum; 43%	Mitt Romney; 27%	Newt Gingrich; 20%	Ron Paul 6%, Other 1%, Undecided 3%
Rasmussen Reports Margin of error: ±4% Sample size: 750	Mar. 21, 2012	Rick Santorum; 43%	Mitt Romney; 31%	Newt Gingrich; 16%	Ron Paul 5%, Some other candidate 1%, Undecided 5%
Rasmussen Reports Margin of error: ±4% Sample size: 750	Mar. 21, 2012	Rick Santorum; 57%	Mitt Romney; 37%	–	–
Magellan Strategies Margin of error: ±2.18% Sample size: 2,018	Mar. 19, 2012	Rick Santorum; 37%	Mitt Romney; 24%	Newt Gingrich; 21%	Buddy Roemer 3%, Ron Paul 3%, Rick Perry 3%, Michele Bachmann 2%, Jon Huntsman 1%, Undecided 6%
GCR & Associates/WWL-TV Margin of error: ±4.4% Sample size: 515	Mar. 8–10, 2012	Rick Santorum; 25.44%	Mitt Romney; 20.97%	Newt Gingrich; 19.81%	Ron Paul 5.63%, Other 1.94%, Undecided 26.21%
Clarus Research Margin of error: ±5.6% Sample size: 300	Nov. 20–22, 2011	Newt Gingrich; 31%	Mitt Romney; 23%	Herman Cain; 12%	Rick Perry 11%, Ron Paul 6%, Michele Bachmann 4%, Buddy Roemer 2%, Jon Huntsman 1%, Undecided 10%
Clarus Research Margin of error: ±5.6% Sample size: 304	Oct. 5–7, 2011	Rick Perry; 23%	Herman Cain; 21%	Mitt Romney; 17%	Newt Gingrich 4%, Ron Paul 4%, Michele Bachmann 3%, Buddy Roemer 3%, Jon Huntsman 1%, Rick Santorum 0%
Wilson Perkins Allen Opinion Research Margin of error: ±7.2% Sample size: 183	Aug. 14–16, 2011	Rick Perry; 30%	Michele Bachmann; 16%	Mitt Romney; 15%	Newt Gingrich 9%, Ron Paul 6%, Herman Cain 2%, Jon Huntsman 2%, Rick Santorum 1%, Hard Undecided/DK/Refused DNR 19%
Public Policy Polling Margin of error: ±5.2% Sample size: 358	Aug. 21–22, 2010	Newt Gingrich; 25%	Mike Huckabee; 24%	Sarah Palin; 20%	Mitt Romney 16%, Ron Paul 7%, someone else 2%, undecided 8%
Public Policy Polling Margin of error: ±4.9% Sample size: 400	Jun. 12–13, 2010	Newt Gingrich; 24%	Mike Huckabee; 24%	Sarah Palin; 23%	Mitt Romney 14%, Ron Paul 6%, undecided 8%
Public Policy Polling Margin of error: ±4.9% Sample size: 400	Jun. 12–13, 2010	Bobby Jindal; 44%	Newt Gingrich; 15%	Mike Huckabee; 14%	Sarah Palin 8%, Mitt Romney 6%, Ron Paul 3%, undecided 9%

== See also ==
- Results of the 2012 Republican Party presidential primaries
- Straw polls for the Republican Party presidential primaries, 2012
- Nationwide opinion polling for the Republican Party 2012 presidential primaries
