= Statewide opinion polling for the January 2008 Democratic Party presidential primaries =

This article is a collection of statewide public opinion polls that have been conducted relating to the January Democratic presidential primaries, 2008.

== Polling ==
=== Iowa ===
Iowa winner: Barack Obama
Primary date: January 3, 2008
Delegates At Stake 45
Delegates Won Barack Obama-16 Hillary Clinton-15 John Edwards-14

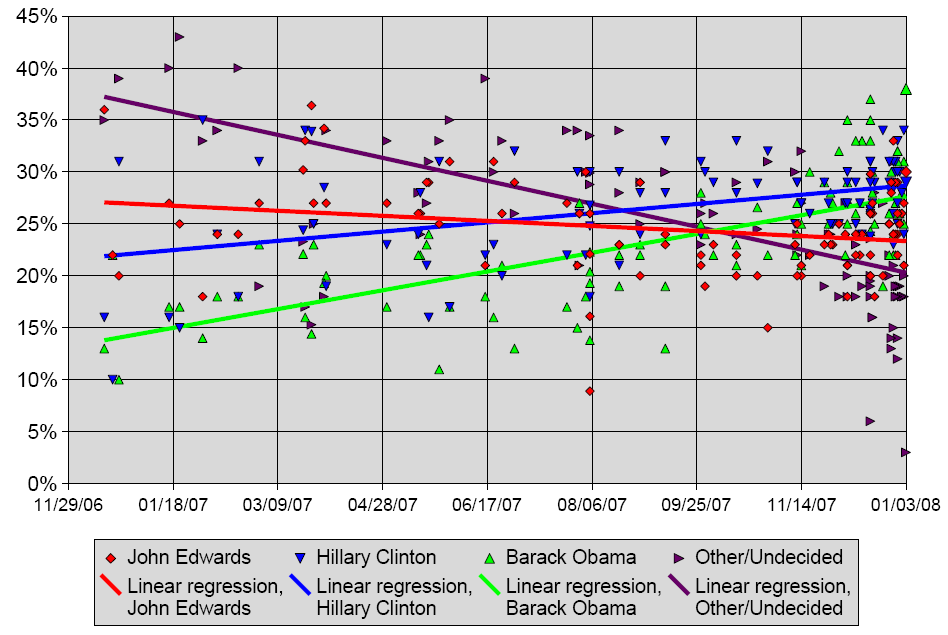
All polling data and final result

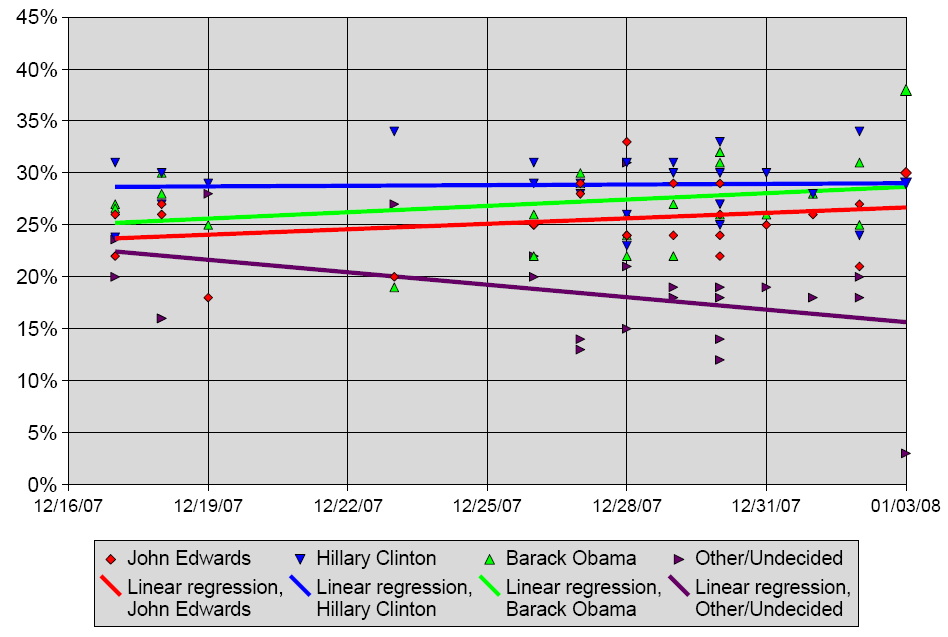
December 18, 2007 to January 3, 2008, polling data including final result

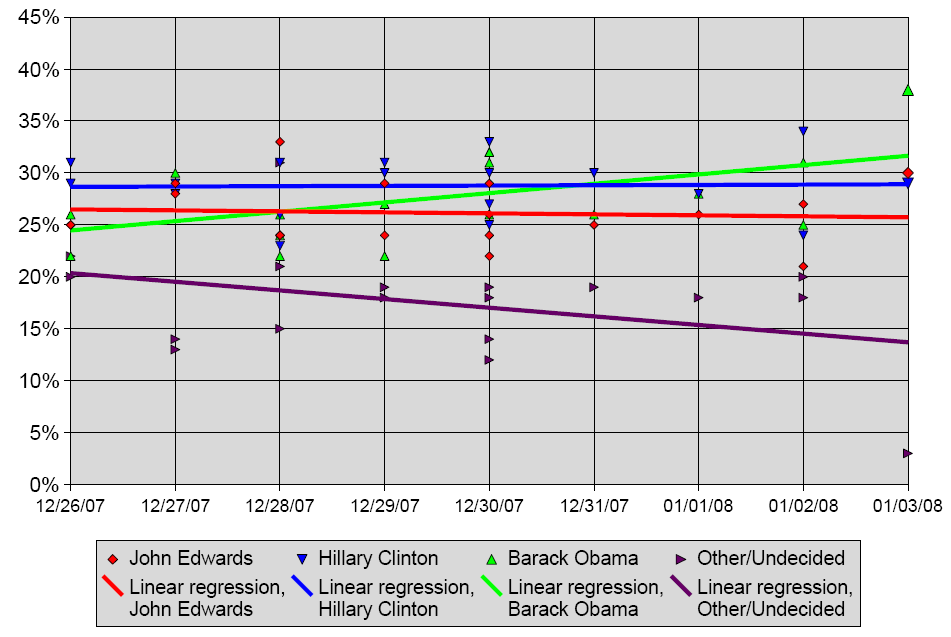
December 26, 2007 to January 3, 2008, polling data including final result

See also

Poll source	Date	Highlights
Actual Result (100% precincts reporting)	January 3, 2008	Obama 38%, Edwards 30%, Clinton 29%, Richardson 2%, Biden 1%
American Research Group Sample Size: 600; Margin of Error: ± 4%	December 31, 2007 – January 2, 2008	Clinton 34%, Obama 25%, Edwards 21%, Biden 8%, Richardson 6%, Dodd 2%, Kucinich 1%, Gravel 1%, Undecided 3%
Reuters/Zogby Sample Size: 905; Margin of Error: ± 3.3%	December 30, 2007 – January 2, 2008	Obama 31%, John Edwards 27%, Clinton 24%, Richardson 7%, Biden 5%, Dodd 1%, Kucinich <1%, Undecided 5%
Reuters/Zogby Sample Size: 933; Margin of Error: ± 3.3%	December 29, 2007 – January 1, 2008	Obama 28%, Clinton 28%, John Edwards 26%, Richardson 7%, Biden 4%, Dodd 1%, Kucinich 1%
Strategic Vision Sample Size: 600; Margin of Error: ±4.5%	December 28–30, 2007	Obama 32%, Edwards 29%, Clinton 27%, Biden 5%, Richardson 2%, Dodd 1%, Kucinich 1%, Undecided 3%
Zogby Sample Size: 934; Margin of Error: ± 3.3%	December 28–31, 2007	Clinton 30%, Obama 26%, Edwards 25%, Biden 5%, Richardson 5%, Dodd 1%, Kucinich <1%, Undecided 7%
Des Moines Register Sample Size: 800; Margin of Error: ± 3.5%	December 27–30, 2007	Obama 32%, Clinton 25%, Edwards 24%, Richardson 6%, Biden 4%
CNN Sample Size: 482; Margin of Error: ± 4.5%	December 26–30, 2007	Clinton 33%, Obama 31%, Edwards 22%, Richardson 5%, Biden 5%
Insider Advantage Sample Size: 788; Margin of Error: ± 3.4%	December 26–29, 2007	Clinton 30%, Edwards 29%, Obama 22%
Reuters/Zogby Sample Size: 899; Margin of Error: ± 3.3%	December 27–30, 2007	Clinton 30%, Obama 26%, Edwards 26%
Zogby Sample Size: 934; Margin of Error: ± 3.3%	December 26–29, 2007	Clinton 31%, Obama 27%, Edwards 24%, Biden 5%, Richardson 5%, Dodd 1%, Kucinich <1%, Undecided 6%
MSNBC/Mason-Dixon Sample Size: 400; Margin of Error: 5%	December 26–28, 2007	Edwards 24%, Clinton 23%, Obama 22%, Richardson 12%, Biden 8%
MSNBC/Mason-Dixon(Second Choice, cumulative) Sample Size: 400; Margin of Error: 5%	December 26–28, 2007	Edwards 33%, Obama 26%, Clinton 26%
American Research Group Sample Size: 600; Margin of Error: ± 4%	December 26–28, 2007	Clinton 31%, Obama 24%, Edwards 24%, Biden 5%, Richardson 5%, Dodd 3%, Kucinich 1%, Gravel -, Undecided 7%
Research 2000/Sioux City Journal Sample Size: 500; Margin of Error: ±4.5%	December 26–27, 2007	Obama 29%, Edwards 29%, Clinton 28%, Richardson 7%, Biden 3%, Dodd 1%, Kucinich 1%, Undecided 2%
Strategic Vision Sample Size: 600; Margin of Error: ±4.5%	December 26–27, 2007	Obama 30%, Clinton 29%, Edwards 28%, Biden 5%, Richardson 2%, Dodd 1%, Kucinich 1%, Undecided 4%
LA Times/Bloomberg (registered voters) Sample Size: 2,145(total poll); Margin of Error: ±4%	December 20–26, 2007	Clinton 29%, Obama 26%, Edwards 25%
LA Times/Bloomberg (Likely Caucus Goers) Sample Size: 389; Margin of Error: ±4%	December 20–26, 2007	Clinton 31%, Edwards 25%, Obama 22%
American Research Group Sample Size: 600; Margin of Error: ± 4%	December 20–23, 2007	Clinton 34%, Edwards 20%, Obama 19%, Biden 8%, Richardson 5%, Dodd 2%, Kucinich 2%, Gravel -, Undecided 10%
American Research Group	December 16–19, 2007	Clinton 29%, Obama 25%, Edwards 18%, Biden 8%, Richardson 7%, Dodd 3%, Kucinich 2%, Gravel -, Undecided 8%
Strategic Vision	December 16–18, 2007	Obama 30%, Clinton 27%, Edwards 27%, Biden 5%, Richardson 3%, Kucinich 1%, Dodd 1%, Undecided 6%
CNN/Opinion Research	December 14–18, 2007	Clinton 30%, Obama 28%, Edwards 26%, Richardson 7%, Biden 3%
Rassmusen	December 17, 2007	Clinton 31%, Obama 27%, Edwards 22%, Richardson 9%, Biden 5%
InsiderAdvantage (highly likely voters)	December 16–17, 2007	Obama 26.6%, Edwards, 26.0%, Clinton 23.8%
InsiderAdvantage (likely voters)	December 16–17, 2007	Edwards 29.8%, Clinton 26.4%, Obama 24.3%
ABC/Washington Post (reallocating support for non-viable candidates)	December 13–17, 2007	Obama 37%, Clinton 31%, Edwards 26%
ABC/Washington Post ("absolutely certain" caucus-goers)	December 13–17, 2007	Obama 35%, Clinton 26%, Edwards 20%
ABC/Washington Post (all caucus-goers)	December 13–17, 2007	Obama 33%, Clinton 29%, Edwards 20%, Richardson 8%, Biden 4%, Kucinich 1%, Dodd 1%, No opinion 3%
Research 2000/Quad City Times	December 10–13, 2007	Obama 33%, Clinton 24%, Edwards 24%, Richardson 9%, Biden 3%, Dodd 1%, Kucinich 1%
Diageo/The Hotline/FD	December 7–12, 2007	Obama 27%, Clinton 27%, Edwards 22%, Richardson 8%, Biden 5%
Rasmussen Reports	December 10, 2007	Clinton 29%, Obama 26%, Edwards 22%, Richardson 7%, Biden 5%, Other 3%
Strategic Vision	December 8–10, 2007	Obama 33%, Clinton 25%, Edwards 24%, Richardson 4%, Biden 4%, Dodd 1%, Kucinich 1%, Undecided 8%
Newsweek (Likely caucus-goers)	December 5–6, 2007	Obama 35%, Clinton 29%, Edwards 18%
Newsweek (All Democratic voters)	December 5–6, 2007	Clinton 30%, Obama 29%, Edwards 21%
Global Strategy Group/Edwards Campaign Internal Poll	December 2–5, 2007	Clinton 27% (26%), Edwards 24% (25%), Obama 22% (23%), Richardson 9% (8%), Biden 6% (7%), Kucinich 2%, Dodd 1%, Gravel -, Undecided 9%
Mason-Dixon	December 3–6, 2007	Clinton 27%, Obama 25%, Edwards 21%, Richardson 9%, Biden 5%
Strategic Vision	November 30 – December 2, 2007	Obama 32%, Edwards 25%, Clinton 25%, Biden 5%, Richardson 3%, Dodd 1%, Kucinich 1%, Gravel -, Undecided 8%
American Research Group	November 26–29, 2007	Obama 27%, Clinton 25%, Edwards 23%, Biden 8%, Richardson 4%, Dodd 3%, Kucinich 2%, Gravel -, Other 2%
Des Moines Register Poll	November 25–28, 2007	Obama 28%, Clinton 25%, Edwards 23%, Richardson 9%, Biden 6%
Rasmussen Reports	November 26–27, 2007	Clinton 27%, Obama 25%, Edwards 24%, Richardson 10%, Biden 4%, Other 2%
Strategic Vision	November 23–25, 2007	Obama 29%, Clinton 29%, Edwards 23%, Richardson 6%, Biden 4%, Dodd 1%, Kucinich 1%, Undecided 7%
ABC News/Washington Post	November 14–18, 2007	Obama 30%, Clinton 26%, Edwards 22%, Richardson 11%, Biden 4%, Kucinich 2%, Dodd 1%, Gravel -%, No Opinion 3%, Other 1%
KCCI Des Moines	November 12–14, 2007	Clinton 27%, Obama 25%, Edwards 21%, Richardson 10%, Biden 4%, Dodd 1%, Kucinich 1%, Gravel -%, Undecided 11%
American Research Group	November 10–14, 2007	Clinton 27%, Obama 21%, Edwards 20%, Richardson 12%, Biden 5%, Dodd 3%, Kucinich 2%, Gravel -%, Undecided 10%
Rasmussen Reports	November 12, 2007	Clinton 29%, Edwards 25%, Obama 24%, Richardson 10%, Biden 3%, Other 3%
Strategic Vision	November 9–12, 2007	Clinton 29%, Obama 27%, Edwards 20%, Richardson 7%, Biden 5%, Dodd 1%, Kucinich 1%, Undecided 10%
CBS/New York Times	November 2–11, 2007	Clinton 25%, Edwards 23%, Obama 22%, Richardson 12%, Biden 4%, Kucinich 1%, Dodd 1%, Undecided 12%
American Research Group	October 26–29, 2007	Clinton 32%, Obama 22%, Edwards 15%, Richardson 7%, Biden 5%, Dodd 2%, Kucinich 1%, Gravel -%, Undecided 16%
University of Iowa	October 17–24, 2007	Clinton 28.9%, Obama 26.6%, Edwards 20.0%, Richardson 7.2%, Biden 5.3%, Don't know 8.9%, Others 3.3%
Strategic Vision	October 12–14, 2007	Clinton 28%, Obama 23%, Edwards 20%, Richardson 9%, Biden 6%, Kucinich 1%, Dodd 1%, Undecided 12%
Rasmussen Reports	October 10 & October 14, 2007	Clinton 33%, Edwards 22%, Obama 21%, Richardson 9%, Biden 4%, Other 2%
Des Moines Register	October 1–3, 2007	Clinton 29%, Edwards 23%, Obama 22%, Richardson 8%, Biden 5%, Kucinich 1%, Dodd 1%, Gravel -%, Undecided 11%
American Research Group	September 26–29, 2007	Clinton 30%, Obama 24%, Edwards 19%, Richardson 10%, Biden 3%, Kucinich 1%, Dodd 1%, Gravel -%, Undecided 13%
Newsweek (All Democratic voters)	September 26–27, 2007	Clinton 31%, Obama 25%, Edwards 21%, Richardson 6%, Biden 3%, Kucinich 1%, Dodd 1%, Gravel 0%, Undecided 12%
Newsweek (Likely caucus-goers)	September 26–27, 2007	Obama 28%, Clinton 24%, Edwards 22%, Richardson 10%, Biden 5%, Kucinich 1%, Dodd 1%, Gravel 0%, Undecided 9%
Los Angeles Times/Bloomberg	September 6–10, 2007	Clinton 28%, Edwards 23%, Obama 19%, Richardson 10%, Biden 2%, Kucinich 2%, Dodd 1%, Gravel 0.5%, Undecided 16%
Los Angeles Times/Bloomberg (Democrats only)	September 6–10, 2007	Clinton 33%, Edwards 24%, Obama 13%, Richardson 11%
American Research Group	August 26–29, 2007	Clinton 28%, Obama 23%, Edwards 20%, Richardson 13%, Kucinich 3%, Biden 1%, Dodd 1%, Gravel -, undecided 11%
Time	August 22–26, 2007	Edwards 29%, Clinton 24%, Obama 22%, Richardson 11%, Biden 5%, Kucinich 2%, Dodd 1%, Gravel -, Other -, undecided 6%
Zogby International	August 17–19, 2007	Clinton 30%, Edwards 23%, Obama 19%, Richardson 10%, Biden 3%, Kucinich 1%, Dodd <1%, Gravel <1%, undecided 13%
Strategic Vision	August 17–19, 2007	Edwards 23%, Obama 22%, Clinton 21%, Richardson 14%, Biden 5%, Dodd 1%, Kucinich 1%, undecided 13%
University of Iowa (most likely caucus goers only)	July 29 – August 5, 2007	Edwards 26.0%, Clinton 24.8%, Obama 19.3%, Richardson 9.4%, Other 4.1%, undecided 14.4%
University of Iowa (all caucus goers)	July 29 – August 5, 2007	Clinton 26.8%, Obama 22.3%, Edwards 22.1%, Richardson 8.5%, Other 4.1%, Don't Know 16.2%
University of Iowa (self-identified Democrats – volunteered response)	July 29 – August 5, 2007	Clinton 30.0%, Obama 20.4%, Edwards 16.1%, Richardson 5.5%, Dodd -, Biden -, Kucinich -, Other 2.8%, Don't Know 22.7%
University of Iowa (all voters – volunteered response)	July 29 – August 5, 2007	Clinton 18.0%, Obama 13.8%, Edwards 8.9%, Richardson 3.5%, Dodd -, Biden -, Kucinich -, Republican candidate 17.0%, Other 2.6%, Don't Know 30.7%
Hart (D)/McLaughlin (R)	2–3 August 2007	Edwards 30%, Clinton 22%, Obama 18%, Richardson 13%, Biden 5%, Kucinich 1%, Dodd 0%, Gravel 0%, undecided 11%
ABC News/Washington Post	July 26–31, 2007	Obama 27%, Clinton 26%, Edwards 26%, Richardson 11%, Kucinich 2%, Biden 2%, Dodd 1%, Gravel 0%
American Research Group	July 26–30, 2007	Clinton 30%, Edwards 21%, Obama 15%, Richardson 13%, Biden 3%, Kucinich 2%, Dodd 1%, Clark -, Gravel -, undecided 15%
Research 2000	July 23–25, 2007	Edwards 27%, Clinton 22%, Obama 17%, Richardson 11%
American Research Group	June 26–30, 2007	Clinton 32%, Edwards 29%, Obama 13%, Richardson 5%, Biden 2%, Dodd 2%, Kucinich 1%, Clark 1%, Gravel 1%, undecided 14%
Strategic Vision (R)	June 22–24, 2007	Edwards 26%, Obama 21%, Clinton 20%, Richardson 11%, Biden 4%, Dodd 2%, Kucinich 1%, undecided 15%
Fairbank, Maslin, Maullin and Associates (Richardson) (LIKELIEST Caucus Goers)	June 18–20, 2007	Edwards 31%, Clinton 23%, Richardson 18%, Obama 16%, Biden 3%, Dodd 0%, Other 1%, undecided 8%
Mason-Dixon	June 16, 2007	Clinton 22%, Edwards 21%, Obama 18%, Richardson 6%, undecided 25%
Public Policy Polling (D)	May 30, 2007	Edwards 31%, Clinton 17%, Obama 17%, Richardson 10%, Biden 4%, Kucinich 2%, Dodd 1%, Gravel 0%, undecided 17%
American Research Group	May 23–25, 2007	Clinton 31%, Edwards 25%, Obama 11%, Richardson 8%, Kucinich 4%, Biden 3%, Dodd 2%, Clark 1%, Gravel 1%, undecided 14%
Strategic Vision (R)	May 18–20, 2007	Edwards 29%, Obama 24%, Clinton 16%, Richardson 9%, Biden 3%, Dodd 2%, Kucinich 1%, undecided 16%
Des Moines Register	May 19, 2007	Edwards 29%, Obama 23%, Clinton 21%, Richardson 10%, Biden 3%, Kucinich 2%, Gravel 1%, Dodd 0%, Uncommitted/Unsure 11%
Research 2000	May 14–16, 2007	Clinton 28%, Edwards 26%, Obama 22%, Richardson 7%, Kucinich 2%, Biden 2%, Dodd 2%, Gravel 1%, undecided 10%
Zogby	May 14–15, 2007	Edwards 26%, Clinton 24%, Obama 22%, Richardson 6%, Biden 4%, Kucinich 1%, Dodd -, Not Sure 16%
American Research Group	April 27–30, 2007	Edwards 27%, Clinton 23%, Obama 17%, Biden 6%, Richardson 5%, Dodd 2%, Kucinich 2%, Clark -, Gravel -, undecided 16%
Strategic Vision (R)	30 March–April 1, 2007	Edwards 27%, Obama 20%, Clinton 19%, Richardson 4%, Biden 4%, Clark 1%, Kucinich 1%, Dodd 1%, undecided 23%
University of Iowa (Likely Caucus Goers)	19–31 March 2007	Edwards 34.2%, Clinton 28.5%, Obama 19.3%, 12.5% Undecided
Zogby	26 March 2007	Edwards 27%, Clinton 25%, Obama 23%, Richardson 3%, Biden 3%, Kucinich 1%, Dodd 1%, Not Sure 15%
American Research Group	19–22 March 2007	Clinton 34%, Edwards 33%, Obama 16%, Biden 2%, Clark 2%, Dodd 1%, Kucinich 1%, Richardson 1%, Gravel 0%, undecided 10%
University of Iowa	22–25 March 2007	Edwards 36.4%, Clinton 33.9%, Obama 14.4%
University of Iowa	19–21 March 2007	Edwards 30.2%, Clinton 24.4%, Obama 22.1%
American Research Group	Feb, 2007	Clinton 31%, Edwards 27%, Obama 23%, Kucinich 1%, Biden 2%, Clark 1%, Dodd 1%, Richardson 1%, Gravel 0%, undecided 14%
Strategic Vision	16–18 February 2007	Edwards 24%, Clinton 18%, Vilsack 18%, Obama 18%, Biden 5%, Richardson 3%, Clark 2%, Dodd 1%, Kucinich 1%, undecided 14%
Zogby International	7–8 February 2007	Clinton 24%, Edwards 24%, Obama 18%, Vilsack 9%, Biden 4%
American Research Group	29 January – 1 February 2007	Clinton 35%, Edwards 18%, Obama 14%, Vilsack 12%, Kucinich 2%, Biden 2%, Clark 2%, Dodd 1%, Richardson 1%, Gravel 0%, undecided 13%
Strategic Vision Political	19–21 January 2007	Edwards 25%, Obama 17%, Vilsack 16%, Clinton 15%, Biden 4%, John Kerry 3%, Clark 2%, Richardson 1%, Dodd 1%, Kucinich 1%, undecided 15%
Zogby International	15–16 January 2007	Edwards 27%, Obama 17%, Vilsack 16%, Clinton 16%, Biden 3%, John Kerry 3%, Kucinich 1%, Richardson 1%
American Research Group	19 December-23, 2006	Clinton 31%, Edwards 20%, Vilsack 17%, Obama 10%, Kucinich 5%, Biden 2%, Dodd 2%, John Kerry 2%, Clark 1%, Gravel 1%, Richardson 1%
KCCI-TV	18 December-20, 2006	Edwards 22%, Obama 22%, Vilsack 12%, Clinton 10%, Al Gore 7%, John Kerry 5%

=== New Hampshire ===
New Hampshire winner: Hillary Clinton
Primary date: January 9, 2008
Delegates At Stake 22
Delegates Won Hillary Clinton-9 Barack Obama-9 John Edwards-4
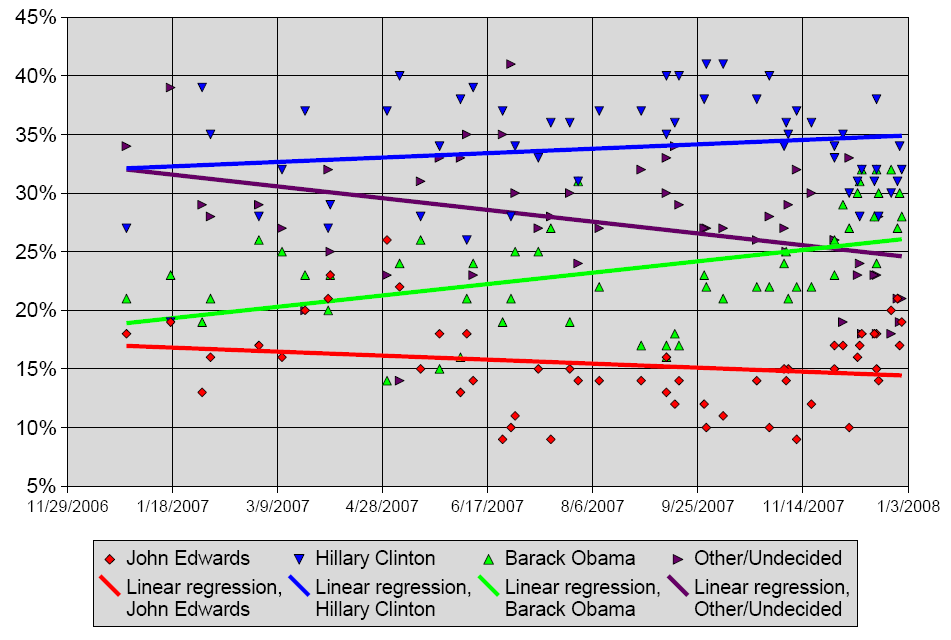
See also

Poll source	Date	Highlights
Actual Result (100% precincts reporting)	January 8, 2008	Clinton 39%, Obama 37%, Edwards 17%, Richardson 5%, Kucinich 1%, Biden <1%, Gravel <1%, Dodd <1%
Reuters/C-SPAN/Zogby Poll Sample Size: 862; Margin of Error: ±3.4%	January 5–7, 2008	Obama 42%, Clinton 29%, Edwards 17%, Richardson 5%, Kucinich 2%
Rasmussen Reports Sample Size: 1774; Margin of Error: ±2%	January 5–7, 2008	Obama 37%, Clinton 30%, Edwards 19%, Richardson 7%, Kucinich 3%
Rasmussen Reports Sample Size: 1203; Margin of Error: ±3%	January 5–6, 2008	Obama 38%, Clinton 28%, Edwards 18%, Richardson 8%, Kucinich 4%, Gravel 0%
Marist College Institute for Public Opinion (likely voters) Sample Size: 636; Margin of Error: ±4%	January 5–6, 2008	Obama 34%, Clinton 28%, Edwards 21%, Richardson 7%, Kucinich 3%, Other <1%, Undecided 7%
Marist College Institute for Public Opinion (likely w/leaners) Sample Size: 788	January 5–6, 2008	Obama 36%, Clinton 28%, Edwards 22%, Richardson 7%, Kucinich 3%, Other <1%, Undecided 4%
CNN/WMUR/University of New Hampshire Poll Sample Size: 341; Margin of Error: ±5%	January 5–6, 2008	Obama 39%, Clinton 29%, Edwards 16%, Richardson 7%, Kucinich 2%
Reuters/C-SPAN/Zogby Sample Size: 844; Margin of Error: ±3.4%	January 4–6, 2008	Obama 39%, Clinton 29%, Edwards 19%, Richardson 6%, Kucinich 2%, Undecided 6%
USA Today/Gallup Poll Sample Size: 778; Margin of Error: ±4%	January 4–6, 2008	Obama 41%, Clinton 28%, Edwards 19%, Richardson 6%, No one else above 3%
Strategic Vision Sampling Size: 600; Margin of Error: ±4.5%	January 4–6, 2008	Obama 38%, Clinton 29%, Edwards 19%, Richardson 7%, Kucinich 1%, Undecided 6%
Fox News/Opinion Dynamics Sampling Size: 500; Margin of Error: ±4%	January 4–6, 2008	Obama 32%, Clinton 28%, Edwards 18%, Richardson 6%, Kucinich 2%, Gravel 1%, Other 1%, Don't know 12%
Franklin Pierce University/WBZ Sampling Size: 403; Margin of Error: ±4.9%	January 4–6, 2008	Obama 34%, Clinton 31%, Edwards 20%, Richardson 6%, Kucinich 1%, Undecided 7%
Rasmussen Reports Daily Poll Sample Size: 1,240; Margin of Error: ±3%	January 4–5, 2008	Obama 39%, Clinton 27%, Edwards 18%, Richardson 8%, Kucinich 3%
American Research Group Sample Size: 600; Margin of Error: ±4%	January 4–5, 2008	Obama 38%, Clinton 26%, Edwards 20%, Gravel 3%, Richardson 3%, Kucinich 1%, Undecided 9%
Concord Monitor Sample Size: 400; Margin of Error: ±5%	January 4–5, 2008	Obama 34%, Clinton 33%, Edwards 23%, Richardson 4%, Kucinich 3%
CNN/WMUR Sample Size: 359; Margin of Error: ±5%	January 4–5, 2008	Obama 33%, Clinton 33%, Edwards 20%, Richardson 4%
Suffolk University/WHDH 7 Sampling Size: 500	January 4–5, 2008	Clinton 35%, Obama 33%, Edwards 14%, Richardson 5%, Kucinich 1%, Gravel 1%, Undecided 11%, Refused 1%
Reuters/C-SPAN/Zogby Poll Sample Size: 844; Margin of Error: ±3.4%	January 2–5, 2008	Clinton 31%, Obama 30%, Edwards 20%, Richardson 7%, Kucinich 3%, Biden 1%, Dodd 1%
Rasmussen Reports Daily Poll Sample Size: 510; Margin of Error: ±4.5%	January 4, 2008	Obama 37%, Clinton 27%, Edwards 19%, Richardson 8%, Kucinich 3%, Gravel 1%
Suffolk University/WHDH 7 Sampling Size: 499	January 3–4, 2008	Clinton 37%, Obama 25%, Edwards 15%, Richardson 4%, Biden 2%, Kucinich 1%, Undecided 12%, Refused 2%
Mason-Dixon/McClatchy/MSNBC/Miami Herald Poll	January 2–4, 2008	Obama 33%, Clinton 31%, Edwards 17%, Richardson 7%, Kucinich 1%, Gravel 0%, Undecided 8%
Zogby Sampling Size: 893; Margin of Error: ±3.3%	January 1–4, 2008	Clinton 32%, Obama 28%, Edwards 20%, Richardson 7%, Kucinich 3%, Biden 2%, Dodd 1%, Undecided 7%
Zogby Sample Size: 960; Margin of Error: ±3.2%	December 312007 – January 32008	Clinton 32%, Obama 26%, Edwards 20%, Richardson 7%, Kucinich 3%, Biden 2%, Dodd 1%, Undecided 8%
Franklin Pierce Sample Size: 403; Margin of Error: ±4.9%	December 27–31, 2007	Clinton 32%, Obama 28%, Edwards 19%, Richardson 8%, Biden 3%, Kucinich 1%, Dodd 1%, Gravel 0%, Undecided 8%
CNN/University of New Hampshire Sample Size: 521; Margin of Error: ±5%	December 27–30, 2007	Clinton 34%, Obama 30%, Edwards 17%, Richardson 5%, Biden 3%, Kucinich 2%, No opinion 8%
American Research Group Sample Size: 600; Margin of Error: ±4%	December 27–29, 2007	Clinton 31%, Obama 27%, Edwards 21%, Richardson 5%, Biden 3%, Kucinich 3%, Dodd 1%, Gravel 1%, Undecided 8%
LA Times/Bloomberg (Likely Voters) Sample Size: 361; Margin of Error: ±4%	December 20–26, 2007	Obama 32%, Clinton 30%, Edwards 20%, Richardson 4%, Biden 1%
Boston Globe/NH University Sample Size: 422; Margin of Error: ± 4.9%	December 16–20, 2007	Obama 30%, Clinton 28%, Edwards 14%, Richardson 7%, Undecided 20%
USA Today/Gallup	December 17–19, 2007	Obama 32%, Clinton 32%, Edwards 18%, Richardson 8%, Biden 4%, Kucinich 3%, Dodd 1%, Gravel 0%, No opinion 3%
American Research Group Sample Size: 600; Margin of Error: ±4%	December 16–19, 2007	Clinton 38%, Obama 24%, Edwards 15%, Richardson 5%, Biden 4%, Kucinich 2%, Dodd 2%, Gravel 1%, Undecided 9%
Rasmussen Reports	December 18, 2007	Clinton 31%, Obama 28%, Edwards 18%, Richardson 8%, Kucinich 3%, Biden 2%, Dodd 1%, Gravel 0%
Concord Monitor/Research 2000	December 10–12, 2007	Obama 32%, Clinton 31%, Edwards 18%, Richardson 8%, Kucinich 3%, Biden 2%, Dodd 1%, Undecided 5%
Rasmussen Reports	December 11, 2007	Obama 31%, Clinton 28%, Edwards 17%, Richardson 8%, Biden 4%, Kucinich 3%, Gravel 1%, Dodd 0%
CNN/WMUR	December 6–10, 2007	Clinton 31%, Obama 30%, Edwards 16%, Richardson 7%
Mason-Dixon	December 3–6, 2007	Clinton 30%, Obama 27%, Edwards 10%, Richardson 7%, Biden 3%, Kucinich 3%, Dodd 1%, Gravel -%, Undecided 19%
ABC News/Washington Post	November 29 – December 3, 2007	Clinton 35%, Obama 29%, Edwards 17%, Richardson 10%, Kucinich 3%, Biden 2%, Dodd 1%, Gravel 0%, Undecided 3%
American Research Group	November 26–29, 2007	Clinton 34%, Obama 23%, Edwards 17%, Richardson 10%, Biden 3%, Dodd 2%, Kucinich 2%, Gravel 1%, Undecided 8%
Rasmussen Reports	November 29, 2007	Clinton 33%, Obama 26%, Edwards 15%, Richardson 9%, Kucinich 4%, Biden 4%, Dodd 1%, Gravel 0%
CNN/WMUR	November 14–18, 2007	Clinton 36%, Obama 22%, Edwards 12%, Richardson 12%, Kucinich 3%, Biden 2%, Dodd 1%, Gravel 0%, Undecided 11%
CBS/New York Times	November 2–11, 2007	Clinton 37%, Obama 22%, Edwards 9%, Richardson 6%, Kucinich 5%, Biden 2%, Dodd 1%, Undecided 18%
Boston Globe (UNH)	November 2–7, 2007	Clinton 35%, Obama 21%, Edwards 15%, Richardson 10%, Other 8%, Undecided 12%
Marist College	November 2–6, 2007	Clinton 36%, Obama 25%, Edwards 14%, Richardson 6%, Kucinich 3%, Biden 2%, Dodd 1%, Gravel <1% Undecided 13%
Rasmussen	November 5, 2007	Clinton 34%, Obama 24%, Edwards 15%, Richardson 8%, Biden 3%, Dodd 3%, Kucinich 2%, Gravel 1%
American Research Group	October 26–29, 2007	Clinton 40%, Obama 22%, Edwards 10%, Richardson 5%, Biden 4%, Dodd 3%, Kucinich 3%, Gravel -%, Undecided 13%
Rasmussen	October 23, 2007	Clinton 38%, Obama 22%, Edwards 14%, Richardson 7%, Kucinich 7%, Biden 2%, Dodd 2%, Gravel 2%, Undecided 6%
Marist College Institute for Public Opinion (Likely Voters)	October 5–7, 2007	Clinton 41%, Obama 20%, Edwards 11%, Richardson 8%, Biden 3%, Kucinich 3%, Dodd 2%, Gravel <1%, Undecided 12%
American Research Group	September 26–29, 2007	Clinton 41%, Obama 22%, Edwards 10%, Richardson 8%, Biden 2%, Dodd 2%, Kucinich 2%, Gravel -%, Undecided 12%
Zogby	September 26–28, 2007	Clinton 38%, Obama 23%, Edwards 12%, Richardson 8%, Kucinich 3%, Biden 2%, Dodd 2%, Gravel <1%, Undecided 10%
Rasmussen Reports	September 16, 2007	Clinton 40%, Obama 17%, Edwards 14%, Richardson 11%, Biden 5%, Some Other Candidates 14%
Franklin Pierce University /WBZ Poll	September 11–14, 2007	Clinton 36%, Obama 18%, Edwards 12%, Richardson 10%, Al Gore 5%, Kucinich 3%, Biden 3%, Dodd 1%, Gravel 1%, Undecided 11%
Los Angeles Times/Bloomberg	September 6–10, 2007	Clinton 35%, Edwards 16%, Obama 16%, Richardson 8%, Kucinich 3%, Biden 3%, Gravel <0.05%, Dodd <0.05%, Undecided 17%
Los Angeles Times/Bloomberg (Democrats only)	September 6–10, 2007	Clinton 40%, Obama 17%, Edwards 13%
American Research Group	August 26–29, 2007	Clinton 37%, Obama 17%, Edwards 14%, Richardson 7%, Biden 4%, Dodd 2%, Kucinich 2%, Gravel 1%,
Rasmussen Reports	August 9, 2007	Clinton 37%, Obama 22%, Edwards 14%, Richardson 9%, Kucinich 4%, Biden 2%, Dodd% -, Gravel -, undecided 11%
American Research Group	July 26–30, 2007	Clinton 31%, Obama 31%, Edwards 14%, Richardson 7%, Biden 2%, Dodd 1%, Kucinich 1%, Clark -, Gravel -, undecided 13%
Hart-McLaughlin	July 24–26, 2007	Clinton 36%, Obama 19%, Edwards 15%, Richardson 12%, Biden 2%, Kucinich 2%, Dodd 1%, Gravel 0%, undecided 13%
CNN/WMUR/UNH Gore Excluded	July 9–17, 2007	Clinton 36%, Obama 27%, Richardson 11%, Edwards 9%, Biden 4%, Kucinich 3%, Dodd -, Gravel -, undecided 9%
CNN/WMUR/UNH Gore Included	July 9–17, 2007	Clinton 33%, Obama 25%, Richardson 10%, Edwards 8%, Al Gore 8%, Biden 3%, Kucinich 3%, Dodd -, Gravel -, undecided 9%
Research 2000 Gore Excluded	July 9–11, 2007	Clinton 33%, Obama 25%, Edwards 15%, Richardson 7%, Dodd 3%, Biden 2%, Kucinich 2%, Gravel 1%
Research 2000 Gore Included	July 9–11, 2007	Clinton 27%, Obama 23%, Al Gore 14%, Edwards 10%, Richardson 8%
American Research Group	June 27–30, 2007	Clinton 34%, Obama 25%, Edwards 11%, Richardson 6%, Biden 4%, Kucinich 3%, Dodd 3%, Gravel 2%, Clark 1%, undecided 11%
Rasmussen Reports	June 28, 2007	Clinton 28%, Obama 21%, Edwards 10%, Richardson 9%, Biden 3%, Dodd 2%, Kucinich 2%
Suffolk University	June 24, 2007	Clinton 37%, Obama 19%, Edwards 9%, Richardson 9%, Kucinich 5%, Biden 2%, Dodd 2%, Gravel 1%, undecided 16%
CNN/WMUR Poll (Gore excl.)	June 6–10, 2007	Clinton 39%, Obama 24%, Edwards 14%, Richardson 11%, Biden 5%, Kucinich 2%
CNN/WMUR Poll (Gore incl.)	June 6–10, 2007	Clinton 36%, Obama 22%, Edwards 12%, Al Gore 12%, Richardson 10%, Biden 4%, Kucinich 1%
Mason-Dixon	June 4–7, 2007	Clinton 26%, Obama 21%, Edwards 18%, Richardson 9%, Biden 6%
Franklin Pierce College/WBZ	June 4, 2007	Clinton 38%, Obama 16%, Edwards 13%, Al Gore 8%, Richardson 8%, Biden 4%, Kucinich 2%, Clark 1%, Dodd 1%, Gravel 0%, Sharpton 0%, undecided 10%
American Research Group	May 23–25, 2007	Clinton 34%, Edwards 18%, Obama 15%, Richardson 9%, Biden 3%, Dodd 3%, Kucinich 2%, Clark 1%, Gravel 1%, undecided 14%
Zogby	May 15–16, 2007	Clinton 28%, Obama 26%, Edwards 15%, Richardson 10%, Kucinich 4%, Biden 1%, Dodd -, Gravel -, Not Sure 15%
Survey USA	May 4–6, 2007	Clinton 40%, Obama 24%, Edwards 22%, Other 10%, undecided 4%
American Research Group	April 27–30, 2007	Clinton 37%, Edwards 26%, Obama 14%, Richardson 3%, Biden 2%, Dodd 1%, Kucinich 2%, Clark -, Gravel -, undecided 15%
Zogby	April 3, 2007	Clinton 29% John Edwards 23%, Obama 23%, Biden 2%, Richardson 2%, Kucinich 1%, Clark -, Dodd -, Gravel -, Kerry -, Not Sure 17%
University of New Hampshire	27 March–April 2, 2007	Clinton 27%, Edwards 21%, Obama 20%, Al Gore 11%, Richardson 4%, Biden 2%, Kucinich 1%, Dodd 1%, Clark 0%, Gravel 0%, Al Sharpton 0%, Other 0%, undecided 12%
American Research Group	19–22 March 2007	Clinton 37%, Obama 23%, Edwards 20%, Richardson 2%, Biden 2%, Clark 1%, Kucinich 1%, Dodd 1%, Gravel 0%, undecided 12%
Franklin Pierce College/WBZ	7–11 March 2007	Clinton 32%, Obama 25%, Edwards 16%, Al Gore 10, Richardson 3, Kucinich 2%, Biden 1%, Clark 1%, Dodd 0%, Gravel 0%, Al Sharpton 0%, undecided 9%
Franklin Pierce College/WBZ (without Gore)	7–11 March 2007	Clinton 35%, Obama 26%, Edwards 18%, Other 8%, undecided 12%
Suffolk University	24–28 February 2007	Clinton 28%, Obama 26%, Edwards 17%, Biden 3%, Kucinich 2%, Richardson 2%, Clark 1%, Dodd 0%, Gravel 0%, Al Sharpton 0%, Refused 1%, undecided 17%
University of New Hampshire	1–5 February 2007	Clinton 35%, Obama 21%, Edwards 16%, Al Gore 8%, Biden 3%, Dodd 1%, Richardson 1%, Vilsack 1%, Clark 1%, Kucinich 1%, Gravel 0%, Al Sharpton 0%, Don't Know 14%
American Research Group	31 January-1 February 2007	Clinton 39%, Obama 19%, Edwards 13%, Other 2%, undecided 21%
Zogby International	15–17 January 2007	Obama 23%, Clinton 19%, Edwards 19%, John Kerry 5%, Clark 3%, Biden 3%, Kucinich 1%, Richardson 1%, Vilsack 1%
American Research Group	26 December-27, 2006	Clinton 27%, Obama 21%, Edwards 18%, John Kerry 6%, Kucinich 4%, Clark 2%, Richardson 2%, Biden 1%, Dodd 1%, Vilsack 1%, Gravel 0%

=== Michigan ===
Michigan winner: Hillary Clinton
Primary date: January 15, 2008
Delegates At Stake 0
Delegates Won 0
NOTE: In moving its primary before February 5, 2008, Michigan has violated Democratic Party rules and their delegates may not be seated at the nominating convention.

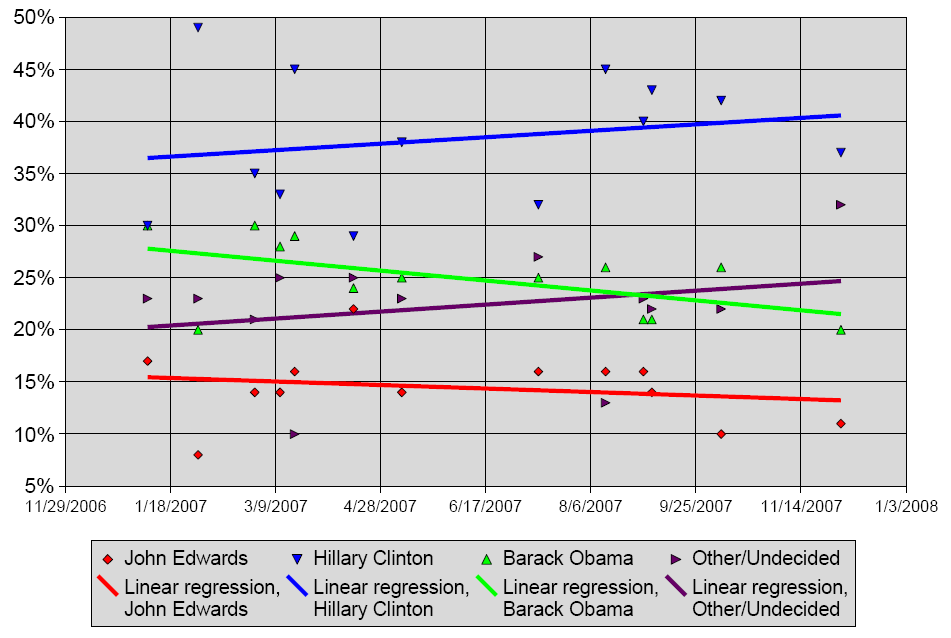

See also

Poll source	Date	Highlights
Actual Result (100% precincts reporting)	January 15, 2008	Clinton 55%, Uncommitted 40%, Kucinich 4%, Dodd 1%, Gravel <1%
American Research Group Sampling Size: 600; Margin of Error: ±4%	January 12–14, 2008	Clinton 56%, Uncommitted 31%, Kucinich 3%, Gravel 1%, Undecided 9%
Detroit News/WXYZ Sampling Size: 600; Margin of Error: ±4%	January 9–12, 2008	Clinton 56%, Uncommitted 33%
American Research Group Sampling Size: 600; Margin of Error: ±4%	January 9–11, 2008	Clinton 57%, Uncommitted 28%, Kucinich 3%, Undecided 12%
Detroit Free Press-Local 4 Michigan Poll Sampling Size: 600; Margin of Error: ± 4%	January 9–11, 2008	For the available slots on the ballot: Clinton 56%, Kucinich 2%, Dodd 0%, Gravel 0%, Uncommitted 30%, Unsure 10% (Obama and Edwards not included in survey) If all of the Democratic candidates were on the ballot: Clinton 46%, Obama 23%, Edwards 13%, Kucinich 2%, Richardson 1%, Gravel 0%, Uncommitted 6%, Unsure 8%
Rossman Group/MIRS/Denno-Noor Margin of Error: ± 5.8%	January 6–7, 2008	Clinton 48%, Kucinich 3%, Dodd 1%, Gravel 1%, Uncommitted 21%, Unsure 11% (Obama and Edwards not included in survey)
The Rossman Group Margin of Error: ± 4%	November 30 – December 3, 2007	Clinton 37%, Obama 20%, Al Gore 13%, Edwards 11%, Kucinich 2%, Other 2%, Biden 1%, Richardson 0%, Undecided/Refused 12%
Strategic Vision (R)	October 5–7, 2007	Clinton 42%, Obama 26%, Edwards 10%, Richardson 7%, Biden 2%, Dodd 1%, Kucinich 1%, Undecided 11%
American Research Group	September 1–4, 2007	Clinton 43%, Obama 21%, Edwards 14%, Richardson 5%, Biden 2%, Kucinich 2%, Dodd 1%, Gravel -, undecided 12%
Detroit News/WXYZ-TV	August 26–31, 2007	Clinton 40%, Obama 21%, Edwards 16%
Detroit News/WXYZ-TV	August 8–13, 2007	Clinton 45%, Obama 26%, Edwards 16%
Strategic Vision (R)	July 8–12, 2007	Clinton 32%, Obama 25%, Edwards 16%, Richardson 7%, Biden 4%, Dodd 1%, Kucinich 1%, undecided 14%
American Research Group	May 4–8, 2007	Clinton 38%, Obama 25%, Edwards 14%, Biden 3%, Dodd 2%, Kucinich 2%, Richardson 2%, Clark -, Gravel -, undecided 14%
Strategic Vision (R)	13–15 April 2007	Clinton 29%, Obama 24%, Edwards 22%, Biden 3%, Richardson 3%, Clark 2%, Kucinich 1%, Dodd 1%, undecided 17%
EPIC-MRA	12–18 March 2007	Clinton 45%, Obama 29%, Edwards 16%, Richardson 4%, Biden 4%, undecided 2%
Strategic Vision	9–11 March 2007	Clinton 33%, Obama 28%, Edwards 14%, Biden 4%, Richardson 2%, Clark 2%, Kucinich 1%, Dodd 1%, undecided 15%
American Research Group	February 23–27, 2007	Clinton 35%, Obama 30%, Edwards 14%, Biden 2%, Kucinich 2%, Dodd 1%, Clark 1%, Richardson 1% Undecided 15%
Detroit Free Press-Local 4 Michigan Poll	28–31 January 2007	Clinton 49%, Obama 20%, Edwards 8%, Al Gore 7%, Richardson 2%, Biden 2%, Kucinich 1%, Dodd 1%
American Research Group	4–7 January 2007	Clinton 30%, Obama 30%, Edwards 17%, Biden 2%, Clark 2%, Kucinich 2%, Dodd 1%, undecided 14%

=== Nevada ===
Nevada winner: Hillary Clinton
Primary date: January 19, 2008
Delegates At Stake 25
Delegates Won Barack Obama-13 Hillary Clinton-12
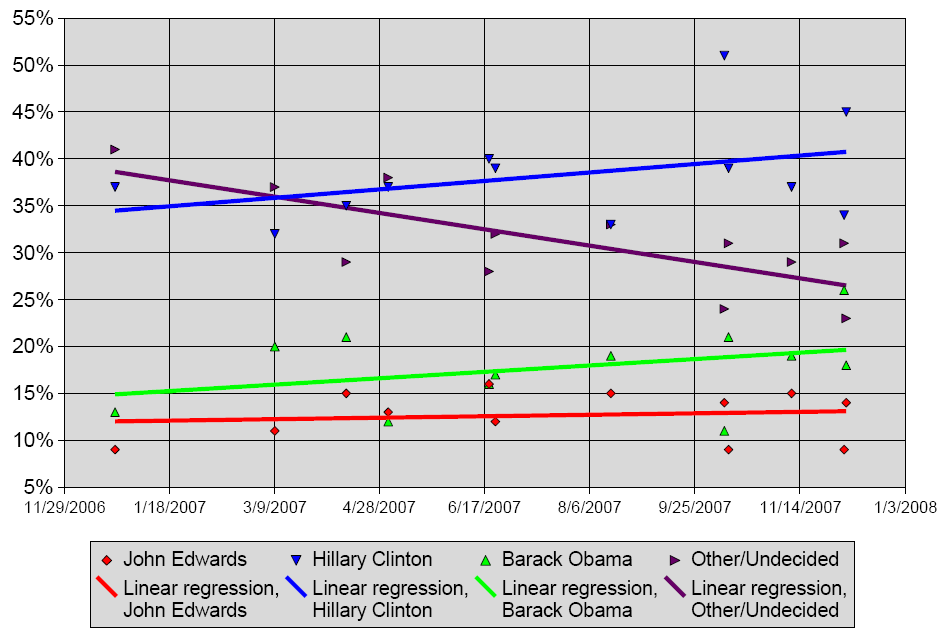
See also

Poll source	Date	Highlights
Actual Result (100% precincts reporting)	January 19, 2008	Clinton 51%, Obama 45%, Edwards 4%, Uncommitted <1%, Kucinich <1%
Reuters/C-SPAN/Zogby Sampling Size: 814; Margin of Error: ±3.4%	January 15–17, 2008	Clinton 42%, Obama 37%, Edwards 12%
Mason-Dixon Sampling Size: 500; Margin of Error: ±4.5%	January 14–16, 2008	Clinton 41%, Obama 32%, Edwards 14%
American Research Group Sampling Size: 500; Margin of Error: ±3.8%	January 9–14, 2008	Clinton 35%, Obama 32%, Edwards 25%
Research 2000/Reno Gazette-Journal Sampling Size: 500; Margin of Error: ±4.5%	January 11–13, 2008	Obama 32%, Clinton 30%, Edwards 27%
American Research Group Sample Size: 600; Margin of Error: ± 4%	December 1–6, 2007	Clinton 45%, Obama 18%, Edwards 14%, Biden 4%, Kucinich 4%, Dodd 2%, Richardson 2%, Gravel -%, Undecided 11%
Mason-Dixon	December 3–5, 2007	Clinton 34%, Obama 26%, Edwards 9%, Richardson 7%
Zogby International	November 9–10, 2007	Clinton 37%, Obama 19%, Edwards 15%, Richardson 6%, Biden 2%, Kucinich 2%, Dodd <1%, Gravel <1%, Not Sure 17%
Mason-Dixon	October 9–11, 2007	Clinton 39%, Obama 21%, Edwards 9%, Richardson 8%, undecided 20%
American Research Group	October 5–9, 2007	Clinton 51%, Edwards 14%, Obama 11%, Richardson 5%, Biden 4%, Kucinich 1%, Dodd 1%, undecided 13%
Reno Gazette-Journal	August 14–16, 2007	Clinton 33%, Obama 19%, Edwards 15%, Richardson 11%, Al Gore 8%, Biden 2%, Gravel 1%, Kucinich 1%, Dodd 1%, undecided 9%
Mason-Dixon	June 20–22, 2007	Clinton 39%, Obama 17%, Edwards 12%, Richardson 7%, Biden 2%
American Research Group	June 15–19, 2007	Clinton 40%, Edwards 16%, Obama 16%, Richardson 6%, Biden 2%, Kucinich 2%, Clark 1%, Dodd 1%, Gravel 1%, undecided 15%
Mason-Dixon	April 30 – May 2, 2007	Clinton 37%, Edwards 13%, Obama 12%, Al Gore 9%, Richardson 6%, undecided 19%
Zogby International	April 11–12, 2007	Clinton 35%, Obama 21%, Edwards 15%, Richardson 5%, Biden 2%, Gravel <1%, Kucinich <1%, Dodd <1%, Not Sure 19%
Gazette-Journal Poll	9 March 2007	Clinton 32%, Obama 20%, Edwards 11%, Al Gore 11%, Clark 2%, Richardson 2%, Biden 1%, Dodd 1%, Gravel 1%, Kucinich 1%
American Research Group	19 December-23, 2006	Clinton 37%, Obama 13%, Edwards 9%, John Kerry 9%, Clark 4%, Dodd 2%, Biden 1%, Gravel 1%, Kucinich 1%, Richardson 1%, Vilsack 1%

=== South Carolina ===
South Carolina winner: Barack Obama
Primary date: January 26, 2008
Delegates At Stake 45
Delegates Won Barack Obama-25 Hillary Clinton-12 John Edwards-8
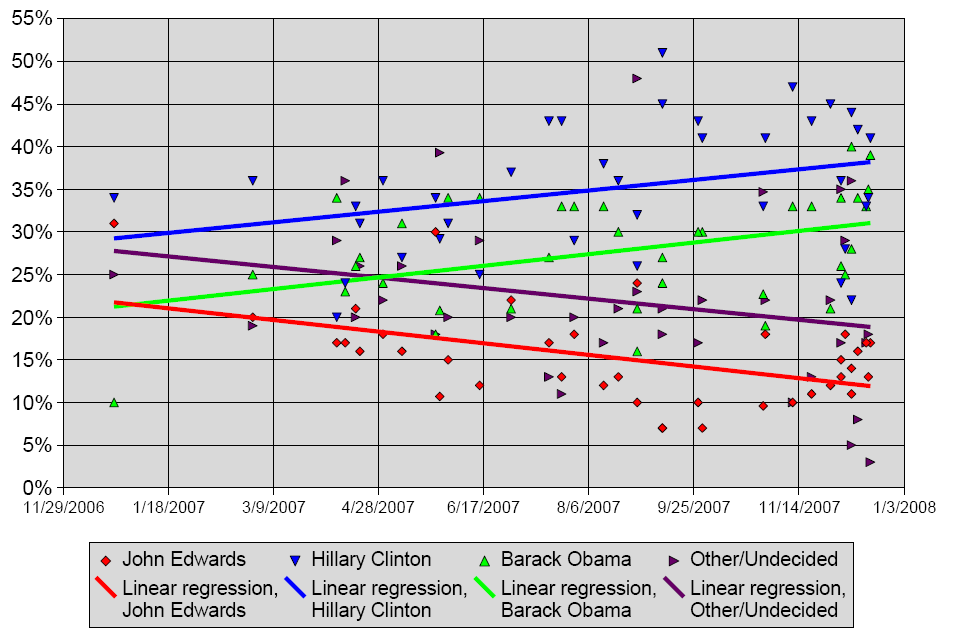
See also

Poll source	Date	Highlights
Actual Result (100% precincts reporting)	January 26, 2008	Obama 55%, Clinton 27%, Edwards 18%
Reuters/C-SPAN/Zogby Sampling Size: 816; Margin of Error: ±3.4%	January 24–25, 2008	Obama 41%, Clinton 26%, Edwards 19%, Undecided 14%
Survey USA Sampling Size: 606; Margin of Error: ±4.1%	January 23–24, 2008	Obama 43%, Clinton 30%, Edwards 24%, Other 2%, Undecided 2%
Reuters/C-SPAN/Zogby Sampling Size: 811; Margin of Error: ±3.4%	January 22–24, 2008	Obama 38%, Clinton 25%, Edwards 21%, Undecided 16%
Mason Dixon Sampling Size: 400; Margin of Error: ±5%	January 22–23, 2008	Obama 38%, Clinton 30%, Edwards 19%, Undecided 13%
Survey USA Sampling Size: 685; Margin of Error: ±3.8%	January 22–23, 2008	Obama 45%, Clinton 29%, Edwards 22%, Other 2%, Undecided 1%
Reuters/C-SPAN/Zogby Sampling Size: 811; Margin of Error: ±3.4%	January 21–23, 2008	Obama 39%, Clinton 24%, Edwards 19%, Undecided 18%
Clemson University Margin of Error: ±4.6%	January 15–23, 2008	Obama 27%, Clinton 20%, Edwards 17%, Not Sure 36%
Reuters/C-SPAN/Zogby Sampling Size: 811; Margin of Error: ±3.4%	January 20–22, 2008	Obama 43%, Clinton 25%, Edwards 15%, Kucinich <1%, Gravel <1%, Someone Else 4%, Not Sure 14%
Rasmussen Reports Sampling Size: 624; Margin of Error: ±4%	January 21, 2008	Obama 43%, Clinton 28%, Edwards 17%, Someone Else 5%, Not Sure 6%
Rasmussen Reports Sampling Size: 571	January 16, 2008	Obama 44%, Clinton 31%, Edwards 15%, Other 6%, Not Sure 5%
Survey USA Sampling Size: 577; Margin of Error: ±4.2%	January 15–16, 2008	Obama 46%, Clinton 36%, Edwards 15%, Someone Else 1%, Not Sure 2%
MSNBC/McClatchy/Mason Dixon Sampling Size: 400; Margin of Error: ±5%	January 14–16, 2008	Obama 40%, Clinton 31%, Edwards 13%, Kucinich 1%, Not Sure 15%
Insider Advantage Sampling Size: 400	January 14–15, 2008	Obama 40.6%, Clinton 30.7%, Edwards 13.3%, Other 1.5%, Not Sure 13.8%
Rasmussen Reports Sampling Size: 516; Margin of Error: ±4%	January 13, 2008	Obama 38%, Clinton 33%, Edwards 17%, Other 6%, Not Sure 5%
Rasmussen Reports Sampling Size: 494; Margin of Error: ±4%	January 9, 2008	Obama 42%, Clinton 30%, Edwards 15%, Richardson 2%, Not Sure 10%
Insider Advantage Sampling Size: 393; Margin of Error: ±5%	January 7, 2008	Obama 40%, Clinton 33%, Edwards 15%, Kucinich 2.7%, Richardson 2.1%, No Opinion 6.9%
Rasmussen Reports Sample Size: 553; Margin of Error: ± 4%	January 6, 2008	Obama 42%, Clinton 30%, Edwards 14%
SurveyUSA Sample Size: 579; Margin of Error: ± 4.2%	January 4–6, 2008	Obama 50%, Clinton 30%, Edwards 16%, Undecided 3%, Other 2%
SurveyUSA Sample Size: 496; Margin of Error: ± 4.5%	December 17–18, 2007	Clinton 41%, Obama 39%, Edwards 17%, Other 1%, Undecided 2%
CBS News	December 13–17, 2007	Obama 35%, Clinton 34%, Edwards 13%, Biden 1%, Richardson 1%, Kucinich 1%, Dodd 0%, Undecided/Don't know 15%
Rasmussen Reports	December 16, 2007	Obama 33%, Clinton 33%, Edwards 17%, Some other candidate 9%, Not sure 8%
CNN	December 9–12, 2007	Clinton 42%, Obama 34%, Edwards 16%, Biden 3%, Richardson 2%
Insider Advantage	December 8–9, 2007	Obama 28%, Clinton 22%, Edwards 14%, Biden 10%, Richardson 2%, Kucinich 1%, Dodd 0%, Gravel 0%, No opinion 23%
Survey USA	December 7–9, 2007	Clinton 44%, Obama 40%, Edwards 11%, Other 3%, Undecided 2%
Mason-Dixon	December 3–6, 2007	Clinton 28%, Obama 25%, Edwards 18%, Biden 2%, Richardson 1%
Insider Advantage	December 3–4, 2007	Obama 26%, Clinton 24%, Edwards 15%, Biden 10%
Rasmussen Reports	December 3–4, 2007	Clinton 36%, Obama 34%, Edwards 13%, Other 9%, Undecided 9%
American Research Group	November 26–29, 2007	Clinton 45%, Obama 21%, Edwards 12%, Biden 6%, Richardson 2%, Kucinich 2%, Dodd 1%, Gravel -, undecided 11%
Rasmussen Reports	November 20, 2007	Clinton 43%, Obama 33%, Edwards 11%, Other 6%, undecided 6%
Survey USA	November 9–11, 2007	Clinton 47%, Obama 33%, Edwards 10%, Other 5%, undecided 5%
American Research Group	October 26–29, 2007	Clinton 41%, Obama 19%, Edwards 18%, Biden 6%, Richardson 1%, Dodd 1%, Kucinich 1%, Gravel -, undecided 13%
Winthrop/ETV Poll	October 7–28, 2007	Clinton 33.0%, Obama 22.7%, Edwards 9.6%, Biden 2.4%, Richardson 0.4%, Dodd 0.4%, Kucinich 0.0%, Gravel 0.0%, undecided 29.6%
American Research Group	September 26–29, 2007	Clinton 41%, Obama 30%, Edwards 7%, Richardson 5%, Biden 2%, Dodd 1%, Kucinich 1%, Gravel -, undecided 13%
Rasmussen	September 26–27, 2007	Clinton 43%, Obama 30%, Edwards 10%, Richardson 2%, Biden 2%, Kucinich 2%, undecided 11%
Los Angeles Times/Bloomberg	September 6–10, 2007	Clinton 45%, Obama 27%, Edwards 7%, Biden 3%, Kucinich 1%, Dodd 1%, Richardson 1%, Gravel <0.5%, Undecided 13%
Los Angeles Times/Bloomberg (Liberal Democrats)	September 6–10, 2007	Clinton 51%, Obama 24%, Edwards 7%
American Research Group	August 26–29, 2007	Clinton 32%, Edwards 24%, Obama 21%, Biden 2%, Kucinich 2%, Richardson 2%, Dodd -, Gravel -, undecided 17%
Clemson University Palmetto Poll	August 20–29, 2007	Clinton 26%, Obama 16%, Edwards 10%, Al Gore 8%, Biden 3%, Richardson 2%, Kucinich -%, Dodd -, Gravel -, undecided 35%
Rasmussen Reports	August 20, 2007	Clinton 36%, Obama 30%, Edwards 13%, Biden 3%, Richardson 2%
Public Policy Polling (D)	August 13, 2007	Clinton 38%, Obama 33%, Edwards 12%, Richardson 3%, Biden 3%, Kucinich 1%, Others 0%, undecided 12%
American Research Group	July 26–30, 2007	Obama 33%, Clinton 29%, Edwards 18%, Biden 3%, Richardson 2%, Clark 1%, Dodd 1%, Kucinich 1%, Gravel -, undecided 12%
Insider Advantage	July 24, 2007	Clinton 43%, Obama 33%, Edwards 13%, Richardson 5%, Biden 4%, Gravel 1%, Others 1%, undecided 5%
CNN/Opinion Research Without Gore	July 16–18, 2007	Clinton 43%, Obama 27%, Edwards 17%, Richardson 2%, Biden 1%, Dodd -, Kucinich -, Gravel -, undecided 9%
CNN/Opinion Research With Gore	July 16–18, 2007	Clinton 39%, Obama 25%, Edwards 15%, Al Gore 10%, Richardson 2%, Biden 1%, Dodd -, Kucinich -, Gravel -, undecided 7%
American Research Group	June 26–30, 2007	Clinton 37%, Edwards 22%, Obama 21%, Biden 3%, Dodd 2%, Kucinich 2%, Richardson 1%, Clark 1%, Gravel -, undecided 11%
Mason Dixon	June 13–15, 2007	Obama 34%, Clinton 25%, Edwards 12%, Biden 2%, Al Gore (Vol) 2%, Richardson 1%, Dodd -, Gravel -, Kucinich -, undecided 34%
Public Policy Polling (D)	May 31, 2007	Obama 34%, Clinton 31%, Edwards 15%
Winthrop/ETV	May 16–27, 2007	Clinton 29.2%, Obama 20.8%, Edwards 10.7%, Richardson 1.8%, Biden .6%, undecided 30.4%
American Research Group	May 23–25, 2007	Clinton 34%, Edwards 30%, Obama 18%, Biden 2%, Kucinich 2%, Richardson 1%, Clark 1%, Dodd 1%, Gravel -, undecided 11%
InsiderAdvantage	May 8–9, 2007	Obama 31%, Clinton 27%, Edwards 16%, Biden 2%, Richardson 2%, Dodd 1%, undecided 21%
American Research Group	April 27–30, 2007	Clinton 36%, Obama 24%, Edwards 18%, Biden 3%, Kucinich 3%, Richardson 1%, Clark 1, Dodd 1%, Gravel -, undecided 13%
Hamilton Beattie (D)/Ayers McHenry (R)	April 14–19, 2007	Clinton 31%, Obama 27%, Edwards 16%, Richardson 2%, Biden 1%, Dodd <1%, Kucinich <1%, Gravel 0%, undecided 22%
News Channel 15/Zogby	April 16–17, 2007	Clinton 33%, Obama 26%, Edwards 21%
WIS-TV/Garin-Hart-Yang (With Lean)	April 9–12, 2007	Clinton 31%, Obama 28%, Edwards 21%, Biden 4%, Richardson 3%, Dodd <1%, Kucinich <1%, undecided 13%
WIS-TV/Garin-Hart-Yang (Without Lean)	April 9–12, 2007	Clinton 24%, Obama 23%, Edwards 17%, Biden 3%, Richardson 2%, Dodd <1%, undecided 13%
InsiderAdvantage	April 6–8, 2007	Obama 34%, Clinton 20%, Edwards 17%, Biden 3%, Richardson 2%, Dodd 1%, undecided 23%
American Research Group	February 23–27, 2007	Clinton 36%, Obama 25%, Edwards 20%, Biden 3%, Clark 1%, Kucinich 1%, Richardson 1%, Dodd 1%, Gravel 0%, undecided 14%
American Research Group	21 December-23, 2006	Clinton 34%, Edwards 31%, Obama 10%, John Kerry 3%, Biden 2%, Clark 2%, Kucinich 2%, Richardson 1%, Dodd 0%, Gravel 0%, Vilsack 0%, undecided 15%

=== Florida ===
Florida winner: Hillary Clinton
Primary date: January 29, 2008
Delegates At Stake 0
Delegates Won 0
Note: In moving its primary before February 5, 2008, Florida has violated Democratic Party rules and their delegates may not be seated at the nominating convention.
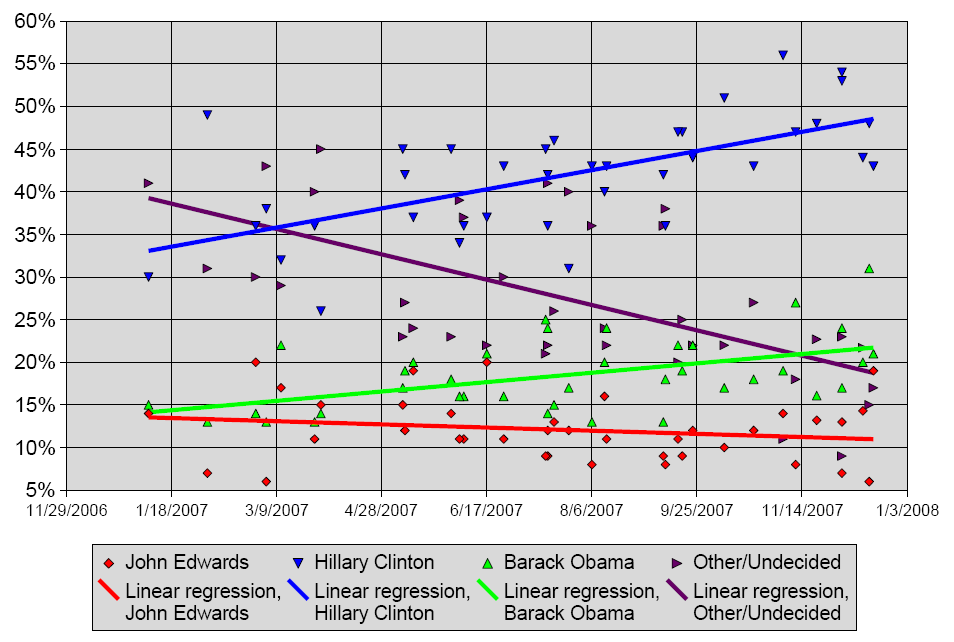
See also

Poll source	Date	Highlights
Actual Result (99% precincts reporting)	January 30, 2008	Clinton 50%, Obama 33%, Edwards 14%, Kucinich 1%
Survey USA Sampling Size: 903; Margin of Error: ±3.3%	January 27–28, 2008	Clinton 50%, Obama 33%, Edwards 10%, Other 3%, Undeclared 4%
Rasmussen Reports Sampling Size: 474; Margin of Error: ±4%	January 27, 2008	Clinton 47%, Obama 25%, Edwards 16%, Other 9%, Undeclared 4%
Survey USA Sampling Size: 564; Margin of Error: ±4.2%	January 27, 2008	Clinton 49%, Obama 29%, Edwards 14%, Other 4%, Undeclared 5%
Strategic Vision Sampling Size: 600; Margin of Error: ±4.5%	January 25–27, 2008	Clinton 49%, Obama 36%, Edwards 11%, Undeclared 4%
Quinnipiac University Sampling Size: 481; Margin of Error: ±4.5%	January 24–27, 2008	Clinton 50%, Obama 30%, Edwards 12%, Other 1%, Undeclared 7%
Survey USA Sampling Size: 522; Margin of Error: ±4.4%	January 23–24, 2008	Clinton 47%, Obama 30%, Edwards 12%, Other 4%, Undeclared 7%
Mason Dixon Sampling Size: 400; Margin of Error: ±5%	January 21–23, 2008	Clinton 47%, Obama 25%, Edwards 16%, Undecided 10%
Strategic Vision Sampling Size: 1450; Margin of Error: ±3%	January 20–22, 2008	Clinton 47%, Obama 36%, Edwards 12%, Kucinich 1%, Undecided 4%
St. Petersburg Times Sampling Size: 800; Margin of Error: ±3.5%	January 20–22, 2008	Clinton 42%, Obama 23%, Edwards 12%, Kucinich 2%, Biden 1%, Gravel 1%, Richardson 1%, Undecided 18%
Survey USA Sampling Size: 517; Margin of Error: ±4.4%	January 20, 2008	Clinton 56%, Obama 23%, Edwards 12%, Other 4%, Undeclared 5%
Insider Advantage Sampling Size: 446; Margin of Error: ±4.5%	January 15–16, 2008	Clinton 42%, Obama 34%, Edwards 9%, Other 6%, Undeclared 9%
Research 2000 Sampling Size: 500; Margin of Error: ±4.5%	January 14–16, 2008	Clinton 50%, Obama 28%, Edwards 13%, Other/Undeclared 9%
Strategic Vision Sampling Size: 605; Margin of Error: ±3%	January 11–13, 2008	Clinton 45%, Obama 39%, Edwards 11%, Kucinich 1%, Undeclared 4%
Survey USA Sampling Size: 601; Margin of Error: ±4%	January 11–13, 2008	Clinton 56%, Obama 23%, Edwards 14%, Other 5%, Undeclared 3%
Quinnipiac University Sampling Size: 419; Margin of Error: ±4.8%	January 9–13, 2008	Clinton 52%, Obama 31%, Edwards 9%, Gravel 1%, Kucinich 1%, Other 1%, Undeclared 5%
Rasmussen Reports Sampling Size: 682; Margin of Error: ±4%	January 9–12, 2008	Clinton 48%, Obama 24%, Edwards 14%, Others 3%, Undecided 12%
Survey USA Sampling Size: 577; Margin of Error: ±4.2%	January 9–10, 2008	Clinton 51%, Obama 32%, Edwards 11%, Other 4%, Undeclared 3%
Insider Advantage Sampling Size: 303; Margin of Error: ±6%	January 72008	Clinton 40%, Obama 32%, Edwards 9%, Richardson 6%, Kucinich 2%, No Opinion 10%
Quinnipiac Sample Size: 397; Margin of Error: ± 4.9%	December 12–18, 2007	Clinton 43%, Obama 21%, Edwards 19%, Biden 3%, Richardson 2%, Dodd 2%, Kucinich 1%, Gravel -%, undecided 8%
Strategic Vision	December 14–16, 2007	Clinton 48%, Obama 31%, Edwards 6%, Richardson 3%, Biden 2%, Kucinich 1%, Dodd 1%, undecided 8%
Datamar	December 9–13, 2007	Clinton 44.0%, Obama 20.0%, Edwards 14.3%, Richardson 3.8%, Kucinich 2.7%, Biden 2.0%, Gravel 1.2%, Dodd 0.3%, Other 1%, undecided 11.7%
SurveyUSA	December 2–3, 2007	Clinton 54%, Obama 24%, Edwards 13%, Other 7%, undecided 2%
Quinnipiac	November 26 – December 3, 2007	Clinton 53%, Obama 17%, Edwards 7%, Biden 2%, Richardson 1%, Kucinich 1%, Dodd -%, Gravel -%, Other 1%, undecided 15%
Datamar	November 16–21, 2007	Clinton 48.0%, Obama 16.1%, Edwards 13.2%, Richardson 5.2%, Biden 4.7%, Kucinich 4.1%, Dodd 1.0%, Gravel 0.6%, Undecided 7.0%
Strategic Vision	November 9–11, 2007	Clinton 47%, Obama 27%, Edwards 8%, Richardson 4%, Biden 2%, Dodd 1%, Kucinich 1%, Undecided 10%
SurveyUSA	November 2–5, 2007	Clinton 56%, Obama 19%, Edwards 14%, Other 9%, undecided 3%
Quinnipiac	October 17–22, 2007	Clinton 43%, Obama 18%, Edwards 12%, Richardson 3%, Biden 1%, Kucinich 1%, Dodd -%, Gravel -%, Other 2%, undecided 17%
Quinnipiac	October 1–8, 2007	Clinton 51%, Obama 17%, Edwards 10%, Biden 2%, Richardson 2%, Kucinich 1%, Dodd -%, Gravel -%, Other 1%, undecided 14%
Strategic Vision	September 21–23, 2007	Clinton 44%, Obama 22%, Edwards 12%, Richardson 6%, Biden 2%, Dodd 1%, Kucinich 1%, Undecided 12%
American Research Group	September 15–18, 2007	Clinton 47%, Obama 19%, Edwards 9%, Biden 5%, Richardson 3%, Dodd 1%, Kucinich 1%, Gravel -%, Undecided 15%
Rasmussen	September 16, 2007	Clinton 47%, Obama 22%, Edwards 11%, Others 5%, Undecided 15%
Insider Advantage	September 6–10, 2007	Clinton 36%, Obama 18%, Biden 9%, Edwards 8%, Gravel 2%, Kucinich 2%, Richardson 1%, Dodd 1%, Undecided 21%
Quinnipiac	September 3–9, 2007	Clinton 42%, Obama 13%, Al Gore 12%, Edwards 9%, Biden 1%, Richardson 1%, Kucinich 1%, Dodd 1%, Gravel -%, Other 3%, undecided 15%
Rasmussen	August 13, 2007	Clinton 43%, Obama 24%, Edwards 11%, Other 6%, undecided 16%
Strategic Vision	August 10–12, 2007	Clinton 40%, Obama 20%, Edwards 16%, Richardson 9%, Biden 3%, Dodd 1%, Kucinich 1%, undecided 10%
Quinnipiac	July 30–6 August 2007	Clinton 43%, Obama 13%, Al Gore 11%, Edwards 8%, Biden 2%, Richardson 2%, Kucinich 1%, Dodd 0%, Gravel 0%, Other 4%, undecided 15%
Mason-Dixon	July 23–26, 2007	Clinton 31%, Obama 17%, Edwards 12%, Richardson 4%, Biden 3%, Kucinich 2%, Dodd -, Gravel -, undecided 30%
Rasmussen	July 18–19, 2007	Clinton 46%, Obama 15%, Edwards 13%, Other 4%, undecided 21%
Quinnipiac	July 12–16, 2007	Clinton 36%, Al Gore 14%, Obama 14%, Edwards 9%
IVR Polls	July 16, 2007	Clinton 42%, Obama 24%, Edwards 12%, Undecided 13%, Others <4%. 19% would switch to Gore if he entered.
American Research Group	July 12–15, 2007	Clinton 45%, Obama 25%, Edwards 9%, Richardson 3%, Biden 2%, Clark 2%, Kucinich 2%, Dodd 1%, Gravel -, undecided 11%
Quinnipiac (without Gore)	June 18–25, 2007	Clinton 43%, Obama 16%, Edwards 11%, Biden 2%, Richardson 2%, Dodd 1%, Kucinich 1%, Gravel -, Other 3%, undecided 18%
Quinnipiac (with Gore)	June 18–25, 2007	Clinton 38%, Obama 15%, Al Gore 13%, Edwards 8%, Biden 2%, Richardson 2%, Dodd 1%, Kucinich 1%, Gravel -, Other 3%, undecided 15%
Strategic Vision	June 15–17, 2007	Clinton 37%, Obama 21%, Edwards 20%, Richardson 4%, Biden 3%, Dodd 2%, Kucinich 1%, undecided 12%
Zogby Poll	June 4–6, 2007	Clinton 36%, Obama 16%, Edwards 11%, Richardson 6%, Biden 2%, Kucinich 1%, Dodd 0%, Other 6%, undecided 22%
Quinnipiac University	May 24 – June 4, 2007	Clinton 34%, Obama 16%, Al Gore 13%, Edwards 11%, Richardson 5%, Biden 2%, Dodd 1%, Kucinich 1%, Clark -, Gravel -, Other 2%, Don't Know 14%
IVR Polls	May 31, 2007	Clinton 45%, Obama 18%, Edwards 14%, Richardson 7%, undecided 11%, Others <3%. 20% would switch to Gore if he entered.
Strategic Vision (R)	May 11–13, 2007	Clinton 37%, Obama 20%, Edwards 19%, Biden 5%, Richardson 4%, Dodd 2%, Kucinich 1%, undecided 12%
St. Petersburg Times	May 6–9, 2007	Clinton 42%, Obama 19%, Edwards 12%, Biden 4%, Richardson 2%, Gravel -, Dodd -, Kucinich -, undecided 17%
American Research Group	May 4–8, 2007	Clinton 45%, Obama 17%, Edwards 15%, Biden 3%, Richardson 3%, Clark 1%, Dodd 1%, Kucinich 1%, Gravel -, undecided 14%
Insider Advantage/Florida Chamber of Commerce	30 March 2007	Clinton 26%, Edwards 15%, Obama 14%, Al Gore 14%, Richardson 7%, Biden 2%
Quinnipiac University	21–27 March 2007	Clinton 36%, Al Gore 16%, Obama 13%, Edwards 11%, Richardson 2%, Clark 1%, Biden 1%, Kucinich 1%, Dodd 0%, Gravel 0%, Someone Else 1%, undecided 14%
Strategic Vision	9–11 March 2007	Clinton 32%, Obama 22%, Edwards 17%, Richardson 5%, Biden 4%, Clark 2%, Kucinich 1%, Dodd 1%, undecided 16%
Quinnipiac University	25 February – March 4	Clinton 38%, Al Gore 13%, Obama 13%, Edwards 6%, Biden 4%, Richardson 2%, Clark 1%, Kucinich 1%, Dodd 0%, undecided 18%
American Research Group	February 23–27, 2007	Clinton 36%, Edwards 20%, Obama 14%, Biden 5%, Clark 2%, Dodd 1%, Kucinich 1%, Richardson 1%
Quinnipiac University	29 January – 4 February 2007	Clinton 49%, Obama 13%, Edwards 7%, Al Gore 7%, Richardson 3%, Biden 2%, Clark 1%, Vilsack 0%, Dodd 0%, Kucinich 0%, undecided 13%
American Research Group	4–7 January 2007	Clinton 30%, Obama 15%, Edwards 14%, Biden 6%, John Kerry 3%, Clark 2%, Vilsack 2%, Dodd 1%, Kucinich 1%, Richardson 1%, undecided 26%
