= AH =

AH and variants may refer to:

== Music ==
- "Ah", song by Charles Aznavour written by Charles Aznavour and José Lucchesi 1954
- "Ah" (song), a Japanese song by Superfly
- "Ah", a song by the Turkish band Duman 2002

== Games and literature ==
- Achievement Hunter, a Texas-based online video gaming community
- Adam Hughes, a comic artist who signs his work "AH!"
- Alternate history, a subgenre of speculative fiction
- Arcana Heart, a video game series
- Avalon Hill, makers of military-themed board games

== Places ==
- Afghanistan, World Meteorological Organization country code
- Anhui, a province of China (Guobiao abbreviation AH)
- Austria-Hungary, a former European empire

== Aviation ==
- Air Algérie IATA designator
- Artificial Horizon, an attitude indicator, an aircraft cockpit instrument
- US military designation of an attack helicopter

== Computing ==
- AH register, the high byte of an X86 16-bit AX register
- Authentication Header (AH), a part of the IPsec protocol suite

== Disease, ventilation and electricity ==
- Adenomatous hyperplasia; see endometrial adenomatous hyperplasia and atypical adenomatous hyperplasia
- Air handler, or air handling unit (AHU), a device used to condition and circulate air
- Ampere hour, a unit of electric charge

== Other fields ==
- Aegyptiaca Helvetica, an archaeological journal published by Schwabe (publisher)
- Ah (digraph), used in Taa language orthography
- Albert Heijn, a Dutch supermarket chain owned by Ahold
- Alkotmányvédelmi Hivatal, the Constitution Protection Office, a Hungarian intelligence agency
- Asian Highway Network, a project among countries in Asia and Europe to improve the highway systems in Asia
- Adolf Hitler, leader of Nazi Germany from 1933-1945
- Hospital ship (US Navy hull classification symbol AH)
- Ahal (vehicle registration suffix AH)

== Other uses ==
- AH (Anno Hegirae), Latin for Islamic "in the year of the Hijra" similar to the Latin for the Christian year Anno Domini

== See also ==
- AAH (disambiguation)
- AHH (disambiguation)
- A-ha, a New Wave/Synthpop band from Norway
- Aa! Japanese band
- Ah Ah Ah (disambiguation)
