= AAH =

AAH, Aah, Aaah, or Aaaah may refer to:

== Organizations ==
- Action Against Hunger, an international aid effort aimed at alleviating malnutrition in children
- Aloha Airlines of the US (ICAO code AAH)
- Arlington Academy of Hope, a non-profit organization operating in Uganda
- Asa'ib Ahl al-Haq, an Iraqi Shi'a insurgent group
- Association of Ancient Historians, learned society and publisher for ancient history
- Association of Art Historians, learned society for art historical study in the UK
- Australian Academy of the Humanities, an institution dedicated towards advancing Australian scholarship in the humanities
- Huron High School (Ann Arbor, Michigan)
- African Americans for Humanism, a program of the Council for Secular Humanism

== Science and technology ==
- Advanced Attack Helicopter, a 1970s US Army program to develop a new attack helicopter
- Atypical adenomatous hyperplasia
- Aquatic ape hypothesis, the idea that human ancestors at some point lived partially in water

== Other uses ==
- Aah (film), a 1953 Hindi film starring Raj Kapoor and Nargis
- Aaaah (film), a 2014 Tamil horror film
- Abu’ Arapesh language, a language of Papua New Guinea
- Aah (god), Egyptian god also known as Iah
- Aachen Merzbrück Airfield in North Rhine-Westphalia, Germany (IATA airport code AAH)
- Adopt-a-Highway, a common name for highway litter control programs
