= AHH =

AHH or Ahh may refer to:

- Aghu language, a Papuan language
- "Ahh", a song by Indonesian boy band SM*SH from their 2011 self-titled debut album
- AllHipHop, a website
- Arthur Hallam (1811–1833), English poet, the subject of Alfred Tennyson's poem In Memoriam A.H.H.
- Cytochrome P450, family 1, member A1
- Screaming

== See also ==
- AH-2 (disambiguation)
- AH (disambiguation)
