= Ark, South Khorasan =

Ark ارك
- Village
- Location within Iran
- Coordinates: 33°01′14″N 58°41′27″E
- Country: Iran
- Province: South Khorasan
- County: Khusf
- Bakhsh: Central District
- Rural District: Khusf

Population (2006)
  - Total: 140
- Time zone: UTC+3:30 (IRST)
  - Summer (DST): UTC+4:30 (IRDT)

Ark (Persian: ارك, also Romanized as Ārk and Arg) is a village in Khusf Rural District, Central District, Khusf County, South Khorasan Province, Iran. At the 2006 census, its population was 140, in 50 families.
