= REACH for Uganda =

REACH for Uganda, formerly the Arlington Academy of Hope (AAH), is a nonprofit 501(c)(3) organization based in Bududa, Eastern Uganda, in the East Africa. The organization seeks to help children in Uganda by providing access to education within their village communities. It also aims to foster cultural understanding and interaction between the people of the United States and Uganda.

AAH began as an informal scholarship program run by Ugandan emigres John Wanda and Joyce Wanda. Donations went to students in rural eastern Uganda to help support their education. AAH built a primary school called Arlington Academy of Hope in Bumwalukani village, which was opened on February 2, 2004. It is the only school in the region which utilizes American models of education, serves lunch, and emphasizes the development of the child as an individual. Many of the children of Arlington Academy of Hope receive sponsorship from Americans.
