= Association of Ancient Historians =

American academic organization

The Association of Ancient Historians (AAH) is the oldest and largest academic organization in the US for scholars of the history of the Ancient Mediterranean World.

== History ==
The Association of Ancient Historians had its origins in 1969, when a number of ancient historians from universities in southern Ontario as well as from the State University of New York at Buffalo gathered at McMaster University for a meeting convened by George Paul, to present papers and discuss topics of mutual interest. Over the next four years, annual meetings were organized at SUNY-Buffalo, the University of Michigan, Penn State University, and the University of North Carolina and Duke University. During this period the annual meetings were enlarged and transformed to conferences of an international character. The success of this transformation, and the recognition that ancient historians needed and were capable of supporting a major professional society, prompted at the meeting at Harvard in May 1974 the forming of the Association of Ancient Historians and the adoption of a constitution.

== Current activities ==
The Association holds an annual 3-day meeting in April or May of each year. Meetings are sponsored by various universities and colleges and have been held in over 30 US venues and 6 Canadian sites. These meetings are designed to foster not only academic research but also informal social interaction among ancient historians, many of whom are the only ones in their fields at their institutions.

The Association also supports academic and personal growth through their mentorship program (pairing younger academics with more senior faculty), a Committee on Teaching, a Diversity Committee, and a program to provide grants to help cover meeting expenses for graduate students and junior faculty.

The Association publishes a Newsletter three times a year, a monograph series, and sponsors paper presentations on ancient history topics at the American Historical Association annual meeting.

== Membership ==
Membership in the AAH is open to all persons with an interest in ancient history. Current membership is between 750 and 800 and includes most of the ancient historians in the US and Canada. The Association also includes members from the UK, Australia, Iraq, Israel, and many European countries.
