= American Research Group =

US polling research firm

- Industry: Marketing research
- Founded: 1985
- Headquarters: Manchester, New Hampshire
- Area served: United States
- Key people: Lafell Dickinson Bennett (president)
- Services: opinion polling

American Research Group, Incorporated is a U.S. opinion polling and marketing research company based in Manchester, New Hampshire, and founded in 1985. The president is Lafell Dickinson Bennett, known as Dick Bennett, who was the pollster for presidential candidate John B. Anderson in 1980.

== Methodology ==
Pollster Mark Blumenthal reported that "what ARG does ... is very different from the way other pollsters ask about party ID. ARG asks about party registration in some states, party identification in others and then combines the two results into a single variable. Whatever the merits of this approach, the results will not be comparable to those of other polling organizations."

In 2004, Gallup interviewed ARG about a poor prediction (22 points adrift) in the Maryland Democratic primary and found their "likely voter" model was "based on just the one question, [which] is a relatively simple approach to classifying voters."

ARG was criticised in 2007 for only using landline respondents, which they justified by arguing that cellular phone users, who are mostly younger people, mostly "don't vote".

== Reception ==
As of November 2019, ARG received a B rating from FiveThirtyEight. FiveThirtyEight's Nate Silver has long critiqued ARG. In 2008, he wrote in Daily Kos about their poor track record and later challenged Bennett to a polling contest that the latter did not take up. ARG was noted by Silver as performing particularly poorly in the 2012 US presidential election: "Polls by American Research Group ... largely missed the mark ... American Research Group has long been unreliable." In 2016, Washington Monthly noted of ARG, based on FiveThirtyEight's analysis, that they have a slight Republican bias but more importantly, "They do not appear to be good at their jobs."

In the 2008 US presidential primaries, ARG were "dead last among the nine organizations that polled in 10 or more contests" for accuracy.

The Washington Post noted that in 2000 ARG's "tracking poll ended up buried deepest in the snowbank: They had Bush winning by two points the day before the primary -- merely 20 off the mark." Salon found in 2004 that ARG did not reveal the funding sources of their polls. Mother Jones observed in 2007 that ARG "may not be the bellwether for accurate polling." The New Republic found in 2008 that "ARG is a black sheep of the polling world; I repeatedly heard it singled out for scorn by other pollsters."
