= Mike Gravel presidential campaign =

Mike Gravel unsuccessfully ran for president twice:

- Mike Gravel 2008 presidential campaign
- Mike Gravel 2020 presidential campaign
