= Statewide opinion polling for Hillary Clinton for the 2008 United States presidential election =

Many scientific, state-wide public opinion polls have been conducted relating to the United States of America (U.S.) presidential election, 2008, matching up Hillary Clinton against John McCain.

One survey group concluded that Hillary Clinton lost some support because of her gender, pointing out that in "head-to-head match-ups, Clinton bests Senator John McCain 48%-43% and Obama wins by the same five-point margin, 47%-42%" but that "given a choice between all three candidates, Obama gets 35% and McCain 37%, both running well ahead of Clinton (28%)" and that "three-way results... reflect an enormous gender gap: Clinton is narrowly the top choice of women with 36%, but only 18% of men pick her first."

== Map of the polling data ==
Clinton vs. McCain
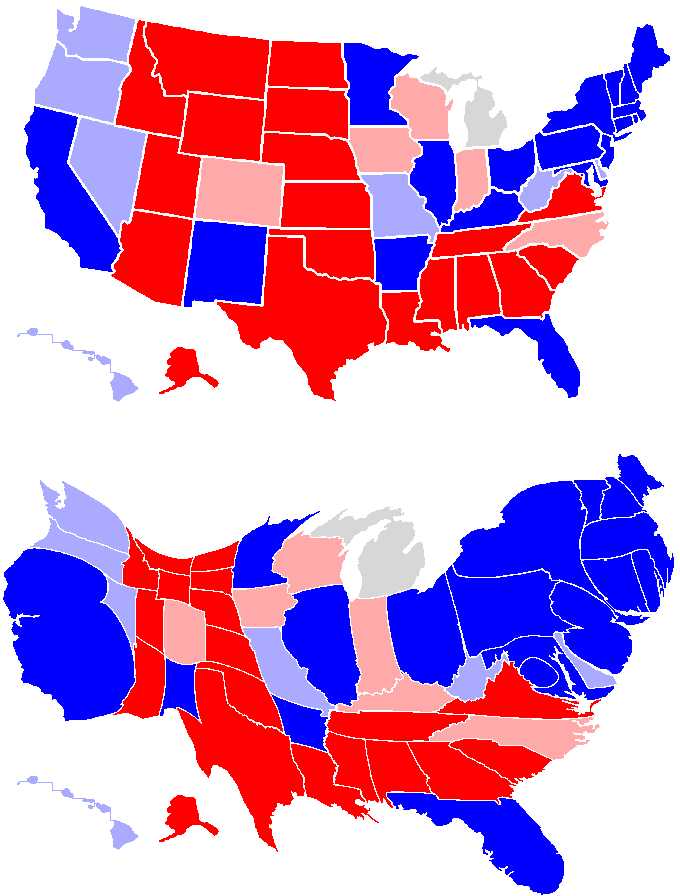
Clinton leads by over 5% (266)
Clinton leads by 1% to 5% (46)
Within 1% (17)
McCain leads by 1% to 5% (52)
McCain leads by over 5% (157)
Totals
McCain leads: 209 electoral votes

Clinton leads: 312 electoral votes

The lower map has been adjusted so that state size represents electoral strength. For details see here. Map and totals updated on June 3, 2008.

== Opinion polling ==
=== Alabama ===
9 electoral votes

Poll Source	Date administered	Democrat	%	Republican	%
Rasmussen Reports	May 27, 2008	Hillary Clinton	34%	John McCain	54%
Capital Survey Research Center/ Alabama Education Association	April 16-April 24, 2008	Hillary Clinton	36.2%	John McCain	55.2%
Survey USA	April 11-April 13, 2008	Hillary Clinton	34%	John McCain	60%
Rasmussen Reports	April 2, 2008	Hillary Clinton	40%	John McCain	51%
University of South Alabama	March 24-March 27, 2008	Hillary Clinton	30%	John McCain	52%
Survey USA	March 14-March 16, 2008	Hillary Clinton	38%	John McCain	56%
Survey USA	February 26-February 28, 2008	Hillary Clinton	41%	John McCain	51%
Survey USA	February 15-February 17, 2008	Hillary Clinton	37%	John McCain	57%
Survey USA	January 16-January 17, 2008	Hillary Clinton	37%	John McCain	58%

=== Alaska ===
3 electoral votes

Poll Source	Date administered	Democrat	%	Republican	%
Rasmussen Reports	May 14, 2008	Hillary Clinton	36%	John McCain	53%
Rasmussen Reports	April 7, 2008	Hillary Clinton	32%	John McCain	57%
Survey USA	February 26-February 29, 2008	Hillary Clinton	34%	John McCain	56%

=== Arizona ===
10 electoral votes

Poll Source	Date administered	Democrat	%	Republican	%
Behavior Research Center	May 12-May 20, 2008	Hillary Clinton	36%	John McCain	51%
Arizona State University/KAET	April 24-April 27, 2008	Hillary Clinton	37%	John McCain	53%
Rasmussen Reports	April 15, 2008	Hillary Clinton	32%	John McCain	60%
Northern Arizona University	March 30-April 8, 2008	Hillary Clinton	34%	John McCain	56%
Survey USA	February 26-February 28, 2008	Hillary Clinton	39%	John McCain	54%
Arizona State University	February 21-February 24, 2008	Hillary Clinton	33%	John McCain	57%

=== Arkansas ===
6 electoral votes

Poll Source	Date administered	Democrat	%	Republican	%
Rasmussen Reports	May 12, 2008	Hillary Clinton	53%	John McCain	39%
Rasmussen Reports	March 18, 2008	Hillary Clinton	43%	John McCain	50%
Opinion Research	March 6-March 11, 2008	Hillary Clinton	51%	John McCain	36%
Survey USA	February 26-February 28, 2008	Hillary Clinton	51%	John McCain	40%

=== California ===
55 electoral votes

Poll Source	Date administered	Democrat	%	Republican	%
Field Research Corporation	May 16-May 27, 2008	Hillary Clinton	53%	John McCain	36%
Los Angeles Times/KTLA	May 20-May 21, 2008	Hillary Clinton	43%	John McCain	40%
Rasmussen Reports	May 19-May 20, 2008	Hillary Clinton	54%	John McCain	35%
Public Policy Institute of California	May 12-May 18, 2008	Hillary Clinton	51%	John McCain	39%
USA Election Polls	May 14, 2008	Hillary Clinton	51%	John McCain	37%
Rasmussen Reports	April 16, 2008	Hillary Clinton	47%	John McCain	42%
Survey USA	April 11-April 13, 2008	Hillary Clinton	53%	John McCain	40%
Public Policy Institute of California	March 11-March 18, 2008	Hillary Clinton	46%	John McCain	43%
Survey USA	March 14-March 16, 2008	Hillary Clinton	56%	John McCain	38%
Rasmussen Reports	March 12, 2008	Hillary Clinton	46%	John McCain	39%
Survey USA	February 26-February 28, 2008	Hillary Clinton	50%	John McCain	40%
Survey USA	February 15-February 17, 2008	Hillary Clinton	58%	John McCain	35%
Survey USA	January 20-January 21, 2008	Hillary Clinton	57%	John McCain	38%

=== Colorado ===
9 electoral votes

Poll Source	Date administered	Democrat	%	Republican	%
Rasmussen Reports	May 19, 2008	Hillary Clinton	44%	John McCain	47%
Rasmussen Reports	April 16, 2008	Hillary Clinton	36%	John McCain	50%
New Leadership USA/ TargetPoint	March 31-April 7, 2008	Hillary Clinton	40%	John McCain	52%
Rasmussen Reports	March 17, 2008	Hillary Clinton	38%	John McCain	52%
Survey USA	February 26-February 28, 2008	Hillary Clinton	42%	John McCain	48%
Rasmussen Reports	February 11, 2008	Hillary Clinton	35%	John McCain	49%

=== Connecticut ===
7 electoral votes

Poll Source	Date administered	Democrat	%	Republican	%
Rasmussen Reports	May 29, 2008	Hillary Clinton	48%	John McCain	42%
Quinnipiac University	March 19-March 24, 2008	Hillary Clinton	45%	John McCain	42%
Rasmussen Reports	March 11, 2008	Hillary Clinton	47%	John McCain	44%
Survey USA	February 26-February 28, 2008	Hillary Clinton	50%	John McCain	40%

=== Delaware ===
3 electoral votes

Poll Source	Date administered	Democrat	%	Republican	%
Survey USA	February 26-February 28, 2008	Hillary Clinton	46%	John McCain	41%

=== Florida ===
27 electoral votes

Poll Source	Date administered	Democrat	%	Republican	%
Quinnipiac University	May 13-May 20, 2008	Hillary Clinton	48%	John McCain	41%
Rasmussen Reports	May 19, 2008	Hillary Clinton	47%	John McCain	41%
Quinnipiac University	April 23-April 29, 2008	Hillary Clinton	49%	John McCain	41%
Rasmussen Reports	April 10, 2008	Hillary Clinton	45%	John McCain	44%
Quinnipiac University	March 24-March 31, 2008	Hillary Clinton	44%	John McCain	42%
Public Policy Polling	March 15-March 16, 2008	Hillary Clinton	43%	John McCain	47%
Rasmussen Reports	March 12, 2008	Hillary Clinton	40%	John McCain	47%
Survey USA	February 26-February 28, 2008	Hillary Clinton	51%	John McCain	42%
Mason Dixon	February 21-February 24, 2008	Hillary Clinton	40%	John McCain	49%
Rasmussen Reports	February 16, 2008	Hillary Clinton	43%	John McCain	49%
Quinnipiac University	February 6-February 12, 2008	Hillary Clinton	42%	John McCain	44%

=== Georgia ===
15 electoral votes

Poll Source	Date administered	Democrat	%	Republican	%
Rasmussen Reports	May 6, 2008	Hillary Clinton	37%	John McCain	48%
Rasmussen Reports	March 20, 2008	Hillary Clinton	34%	John McCain	54%
Survey USA	February 26-February 28, 2008	Hillary Clinton	35%	John McCain	56%

=== Hawaii ===
4 electoral votes

Poll Source	Date administered	Democrat	%	Republican	%
Survey USA	February 26-February 29, 2008	Hillary Clinton	43%	John McCain	39%

=== Idaho ===
4 electoral votes

Poll Source	Date administered	Democrat	%	Republican	%
Survey USA	February 26-February 28, 2008	Hillary Clinton	27%	John McCain	63%

=== Illinois ===
21 electoral votes

Poll Source	Date administered	Democrat	%	Republican	%
Survey USA	February 26-February 28, 2008	Hillary Clinton	48%	John McCain	37%
Research 2000	January 21-January 24, 2008	Hillary Clinton	54%	John McCain	40%

=== Indiana ===
11 electoral votes

Poll Source	Date administered	Democrat	%	Republican	%
Downs Center/ Survey USA	April 28-April 30, 2008	Hillary Clinton	48%	John McCain	45%
Research 2000/ South Bend Tribune	April 23-April 24, 2008	Hillary Clinton	41%	John McCain	52%
Selzer & Co./WTHR/ Indianapolis Star	April 20-April 23, 2008	Hillary Clinton	46%	John McCain	46%
Downs Center/ Survey USA	April 14-April 16, 2008	Hillary Clinton	42%	John McCain	53%
Survey USA	February 26-February 28, 2008	Hillary Clinton	36%	John McCain	53%
Survey USA	February 3-February 4, 2008	Hillary Clinton	42%	John McCain	51%

=== Iowa ===
7 electoral votes

Poll Source	Date administered	Democrat	%	Republican	%
Rasmussen Reports	May 13, 2008	Hillary Clinton	42%	John McCain	45%
Research2000	April 21-April 23, 2008	Hillary Clinton	43%	John McCain	42%
Survey USA	April 11-April 13, 2008	Hillary Clinton	42%	John McCain	48%
Rasmussen Reports	March 31, 2008	Hillary Clinton	36%	John McCain	51%
Survey USA	March 14-March 16, 2008	Hillary Clinton	44%	John McCain	48%
Survey USA	February 26-February 28, 2008	Hillary Clinton	41%	John McCain	46%
Des Moines Register	February 17-February 20, 2008	Hillary Clinton	40%	John McCain	49%
Rasmussen Reports	February 18, 2008	Hillary Clinton	37%	John McCain	47%
Survey USA	February 15-February 17, 2008	Hillary Clinton	41%	John McCain	52%
Survey USA	January 4-January 6, 2008	Hillary Clinton	44%	John McCain	48%

=== Kansas ===
6 electoral votes

Poll Source	Date administered	Democrat	%	Republican	%
Rasmussen Reports	May 13, 2008	Hillary Clinton	39%	John McCain	53%
Survey USA	April 11-April 13, 2008	Hillary Clinton	36%	John McCain	57%
Survey USA	March 14-March 16, 2008	Hillary Clinton	36%	John McCain	55%
Survey USA	February 26-February 28, 2008	Hillary Clinton	42%	John McCain	51%
Survey USA	February 15-February 17, 2008	Hillary Clinton	35%	John McCain	59%
Survey USA	January 16-January 17, 2008	Hillary Clinton	40%	John McCain	53%

=== Kentucky ===
8 electoral votes

Poll Source	Date administered	Democrat	%	Republican	%
Rasmussen Reports	May 22, 2008	Hillary Clinton	51%	John McCain	42%
Mason Dixon/WKYT/ Lexington Herald-Leader	May 7-May 9, 2008	Hillary Clinton	41%	John McCain	53%
Survey USA	April 11-April 13, 2008	Hillary Clinton	46%	John McCain	48%
Survey USA	March 14-March 16, 2008	Hillary Clinton	43%	John McCain	53%
Survey USA	February 26-February 28, 2008	Hillary Clinton	41%	John McCain	50%
Survey USA	February 3-February 4, 2008	Hillary Clinton	43%	John McCain	53%

=== Louisiana ===
9 electoral votes

Poll Source	Date administered	Democrat	%	Republican	%
Rasmussen Reports	May 28, 2008	Hillary Clinton	40%	John McCain	47%
Rasmussen Reports	April 9, 2008	Hillary Clinton	36%	John McCain	58%
Survey USA	February 26-February 28, 2008	Hillary Clinton	41%	John McCain	51%

=== Maine ===
4 electoral votes

Poll Source	Date administered	Democrat	%	Republican	%
Rasmussen Reports	May 14, 2008	Hillary Clinton	51%	John McCain	38%
Rasmussen Reports	April 1, 2008	Hillary Clinton	47%	John McCain	42%
Survey USA	February 26-February 28, 2008	Hillary Clinton	48%	John McCain	42%

=== Maryland ===
10 electoral votes

Poll Source	Date administered	Democrat	%	Republican	%
Survey USA	February 26-February 28, 2008	Hillary Clinton	49%	John McCain	40%

=== Massachusetts ===
12 electoral votes

Poll Source	Date administered	Democrat	%	Republican	%
Rasmussen Reports	May 28, 2008	Hillary Clinton	60%	John McCain	30%
Rasmussen Reports	April 23, 2008	Hillary Clinton	55%	John McCain	36%
Survey USA	April 11-April 13, 2008	Hillary Clinton	56%	John McCain	41%
Rasmussen Reports	March 18, 2008	Hillary Clinton	54%	John McCain	39%
Survey USA	March 14-March 16, 2008	Hillary Clinton	55%	John McCain	42%
Survey USA	February 26-February 28, 2008	Hillary Clinton	55%	John McCain	37%
Survey USA	February 15-February 17, 2008	Hillary Clinton	52%	John McCain	43%
Survey USA	January 20-January 21, 2008	Hillary Clinton	49%	John McCain	45%

=== Michigan ===
17 electoral votes

Poll Source	Date administered	Democrat	%	Republican	%
Rasmussen Reports	May 7, 2008	Hillary Clinton	44%	John McCain	44%
EPIC-MRA	April 4–9, 2008	Hillary Clinton	37%	John McCain	45%
Rasmussen Reports	March 25, 2008	Hillary Clinton	42%	John McCain	45%
Rasmussen Reports	March 10, 2008	Hillary Clinton	43%	John McCain	46%
Survey USA	February 26-February 28, 2008	Hillary Clinton	44%	John McCain	44%
Rasmussen Reports	February 17, 2008	Hillary Clinton	44%	John McCain	44%

=== Minnesota ===
10 electoral votes

Poll Source	Date administered	Democrat	%	Republican	%
Rasmussen Reports	May 22, 2008	Hillary Clinton	53%	John McCain	38%
Rasmussen Reports	April 22, 2008	Hillary Clinton	47%	John McCain	42%
Survey USA	April 11-April 13, 2008	Hillary Clinton	47%	John McCain	46%
Rasmussen Reports	March 19, 2008	Hillary Clinton	46%	John McCain	47%
Survey USA	March 14-March 16, 2008	Hillary Clinton	49%	John McCain	46%
Survey USA	February 26-February 28, 2008	Hillary Clinton	47%	John McCain	43%
Survey USA	February 15-February 17, 2008	Hillary Clinton	49%	John McCain	45%
Rasmussen Reports	February 16, 2008	Hillary Clinton	42%	John McCain	47%
Survey USA	January 20-January 21, 2008	Hillary Clinton	45%	John McCain	49%

=== Mississippi ===
6 electoral votes

Poll Source	Date administered	Democrat	%	Republican	%
Rasmussen Reports	May 27, 2008	Hillary Clinton	38%	John McCain	48%
Research 2000/Daily Kos	May 19-May 21, 2008	Hillary Clinton	36%	John McCain	55%
Survey USA	February 26-February 28, 2008	Hillary Clinton	42%	John McCain	51%

=== Missouri ===
11 electoral votes

Poll Source	Date administered	Democrat	%	Republican	%
Survey USA	May 16-May 18, 2008	Hillary Clinton	48%	John McCain	46%
Rasmussen Reports	May 6, 2008	Hillary Clinton	43%	John McCain	45%
Survey USA	April 11-April 13, 2008	Hillary Clinton	47%	John McCain	46%
Rasmussen Reports	March 24, 2008	Hillary Clinton	41%	John McCain	50%
Survey USA	March 14-March 16, 2008	Hillary Clinton	46%	John McCain	48%
Survey USA	February 26-February 28, 2008	Hillary Clinton	44%	John McCain	48%
Survey USA	February 15-February 17, 2008	Hillary Clinton	51%	John McCain	44%
Rasmussen Reports	February 12, 2008	Hillary Clinton	42%	John McCain	43%

=== Montana ===
3 electoral votes

Poll Source	Date administered	Democrat	%	Republican	%
Mason Dixon/ Lee Newspapers	May 19-May 21, 2008	Hillary Clinton	40%	John McCain	51%
Rasmussen Reports	April 6, 2008	Hillary Clinton	36%	John McCain	54%
Survey USA	February 26-February 28, 2008	Hillary Clinton	33%	John McCain	53%

=== Nebraska ===
5 electoral votes

Poll Source	Date administered	Democrat	%	Republican	%
Rasmussen Reports	May 15, 2008	Hillary Clinton	34%	John McCain	57%
Survey USA	February 26-February 28, 2008	Hillary Clinton	30%	John McCain	57%

=== Nevada ===
5 electoral votes

Poll Source	Date administered	Democrat	%	Republican	%
Rasmussen Reports	May 20, 2008	Hillary Clinton	46%	John McCain	41%
Rasmussen Reports	April 21, 2008	Hillary Clinton	38%	John McCain	49%
Rasmussen Reports	March 19, 2008	Hillary Clinton	44%	John McCain	43%
Survey USA	February 26-February 28, 2008	Hillary Clinton	41%	John McCain	49%
Rasmussen Reports	February 12, 2008	Hillary Clinton	40%	John McCain	49%

=== New Hampshire ===
4 electoral votes

Poll Source	Date administered	Democrat	%	Republican	%
Rasmussen Reports	May 21, 2008	Hillary Clinton	51%	John McCain	41%
Dartmouth College	April 28-May 2, 2008	Hillary Clinton	36%	John McCain	45%
Rasmussen Reports	April 30, 2008	Hillary Clinton	44%	John McCain	47%
University of New Hampshire	April 25-April 30, 2008	Hillary Clinton	44%	John McCain	47%
Rasmussen Reports	March 16, 2008	Hillary Clinton	41%	John McCain	47%
Survey USA	February 26-February 28, 2008	Hillary Clinton	41%	John McCain	49%
Rasmussen Reports	February 11, 2008	Hillary Clinton	43%	John McCain	41%

=== New Jersey ===
15 electoral votes

Poll Source	Date administered	Democrat	%	Republican	%
Monmouth University/ Gannett New Jersey	April 24-April 28, 2008	Hillary Clinton	52%	John McCain	38%
Fairleigh Dickinson University	March 24-March 30, 2008	Hillary Clinton	48%	John McCain	43%
Rasmussen Reports	March 27, 2008	Hillary Clinton	42%	John McCain	45%
Survey USA	February 26-February 28, 2008	Hillary Clinton	47%	John McCain	42%
Rasmussen Reports	February 27, 2008	Hillary Clinton	50%	John McCain	39%
Fairleigh Dickinson University	February 18-February 24, 2008	Hillary Clinton	43%	John McCain	39%
Quinnipiac University	February 13-February 18, 2008	Hillary Clinton	47%	John McCain	41%

=== New Mexico ===
5 electoral votes

Poll Source	Date administered	Democrat	%	Republican	%
Rasmussen Reports	May 14, 2008	Hillary Clinton	47%	John McCain	41%
Survey USA	April 11-April 13, 2008	Hillary Clinton	46%	John McCain	49%
Rasmussen Reports	April 8, 2008	Hillary Clinton	43%	John McCain	46%
Survey USA	March 14-March 16, 2008	Hillary Clinton	51%	John McCain	45%
Survey USA	February 26-February 28, 2008	Hillary Clinton	47%	John McCain	47%
Rasmussen Reports	February 17-February 18, 2008	Hillary Clinton	38%	John McCain	50%
Survey USA	February 15-February 17, 2008	Hillary Clinton	50%	John McCain	45%
Survey USA	January 20-January 21, 2008	Hillary Clinton	42%	John McCain	51%

=== New York ===
31 electoral votes

Poll Source	Date administered	Democrat	%	Republican	%
Rasmussen Reports	May 28, 2008	Hillary Clinton	59%	John McCain	29%
Siena College	May 12-May 15, 2008	Hillary Clinton	51%	John McCain	39%
Siena College	April 13-April 16, 2008	Hillary Clinton	46%	John McCain	42%
Quinnipiac University	April 14-April 15, 2008	Hillary Clinton	49%	John McCain	37%
Survey USA	April 11-April 13, 2008	Hillary Clinton	55%	John McCain	39%
WNBC/Marist College	April 3-April 4, 2008	Hillary Clinton	48%	John McCain	46%
Quinnipiac University	March 16-March 18, 2008	Hillary Clinton	50%	John McCain	40%
Survey USA	March 14-March 16, 2008	Hillary Clinton	54%	John McCain	41%
Rasmussen Reports	March 11, 2008	Hillary Clinton	50%	John McCain	38%
Survey USA	February 26-February 28, 2008	Hillary Clinton	55%	John McCain	33%
Survey USA	February 15-February 17, 2008	Hillary Clinton	52%	John McCain	41%
Siena College	February 11-February 14, 2008	Hillary Clinton	49%	John McCain	42%
Survey USA	January 20-January 21, 2008	Hillary Clinton	53%	John McCain	40%

=== North Carolina ===
15 electoral votes

Poll Source	Date administered	Democrat	%	Republican	%
Public Policy Polling	May 28-May 29, 2008	Hillary Clinton	34%	John McCain	39%
Survey USA	May 17-May 19, 2008	Hillary Clinton	49%	John McCain	43%
Public Policy Polling	May 8-May 9, 2008	Hillary Clinton	38%	John McCain	46%
Rasmussen Reports	May 8, 2008	Hillary Clinton	40%	John McCain	43%
Rasmussen Reports	April 10, 2008	Hillary Clinton	40%	John McCain	51%
Citivas Institute	April 9-April 10, 2008	Hillary Clinton	37%	John McCain	50%
Rasmussen Reports	March 20, 2008	Hillary Clinton	34%	John McCain	50%
Survey USA	February 26-February 28, 2008	Hillary Clinton	41%	John McCain	49%
Public Policy Polling	February 18, 2008	Hillary Clinton	43%	John McCain	48%

=== North Dakota ===
3 electoral votes

Poll Source	Date administered	Democrat	%	Republican	%
Dakota Wesleyan University	March 24-April 3, 2008	Hillary Clinton	30%	John McCain	59%
Survey USA	February 26-February 28, 2008	Hillary Clinton	35%	John McCain	54%

=== Ohio ===
20 electoral votes

Poll Source	Date administered	Democrat	%	Republican	%
Quinnipiac University	May 13-May 20, 2008	Hillary Clinton	48%	John McCain	41%
Rasmussen Reports	May 15, 2008	Hillary Clinton	50%	John McCain	43%
Quinnipiac University	April 23-April 29, 2008	Hillary Clinton	48%	John McCain	38%
Survey USA	April 11-April 13, 2008	Hillary Clinton	53%	John McCain	42%
Rasmussen Reports	April 8, 2008	Hillary Clinton	42%	John McCain	47%
Quinnipiac University	March 24-March 31, 2008	Hillary Clinton	48%	John McCain	39%
Public Policy Polling	March 15-March 17, 2008	Hillary Clinton	45%	John McCain	44%
Survey USA	March 14-March 16, 2008	Hillary Clinton	50%	John McCain	44%
Rasmussen Reports	March 13, 2008	Hillary Clinton	40%	John McCain	46%
Survey USA	February 26-February 28, 2008	Hillary Clinton	50%	John McCain	40%
Rasmussen Reports	February 17, 2008	Hillary Clinton	43%	John McCain	46%
Survey USA	February 15-February 17, 2008	Hillary Clinton	52%	John McCain	42%
Quinnipiac University	February 6-February 12, 2008	Hillary Clinton	43%	John McCain	44%

=== Oklahoma ===
7 electoral votes

Poll Source	Date administered	Democrat	%	Republican	%
Survey USA	February 26-February 28, 2008	Hillary Clinton	42%	John McCain	50%

=== Oregon ===
7 electoral votes

Poll Source	Date administered	Democrat	%	Republican	%
Rasmussen Reports	May 7, 2008	Hillary Clinton	46%	John McCain	40%
Survey USA	April 11-April 13, 2008	Hillary Clinton	47%	John McCain	46%
Rasmussen Reports	March 26, 2008	Hillary Clinton	40%	John McCain	46%
Survey USA	March 14-March 16, 2008	Hillary Clinton	50%	John McCain	44%
Survey USA	February 26-February 28, 2008	Hillary Clinton	43%	John McCain	48%
Survey USA	February 15-February 17, 2008	Hillary Clinton	41%	John McCain	49%
Rasmussen Reports	February 13, 2008	Hillary Clinton	42%	John McCain	45%
Survey USA	January 11-January 13, 2008	Hillary Clinton	45%	John McCain	49%

=== Pennsylvania ===
21 electoral votes

Poll Source	Date administered	Democrat	%	Republican	%
Rasmussen Reports	May 21, 2008	Hillary Clinton	50%	John McCain	39%
Quinnipiac University	May 13-May 20, 2008	Hillary Clinton	50%	John McCain	37%
Susquehanna; Polling & Research	May 1-May 6, 2008	Hillary Clinton	49%	John McCain	38%
Quinnipiac University	April 23-April 29, 2008	Hillary Clinton	51%	John McCain	37%
Rasmussen Reports	April 24, 2008	Hillary Clinton	47%	John McCain	42%
Strategic Vision	April 18-April 20, 2008	Hillary Clinton	42%	John McCain	46%
Strategic Vision	April 11-April 13, 2008	Hillary Clinton	44%	John McCain	47%
Rasmussen Reports	April 9, 2008	Hillary Clinton	47%	John McCain	38%
Temple University	March 27-April 9, 2008	Hillary Clinton	51%	John McCain	40%
Strategic Vision	April 4-April 6, 2008	Hillary Clinton	45%	John McCain	42%
Quinnipiac University	March 24-March 31, 2008	Hillary Clinton	48%	John McCain	40%
Strategic Vision	March 28-March 30, 2008	Hillary Clinton	47%	John McCain	41%
Rasmussen Reports	March 10, 2008	Hillary Clinton	44%	John McCain	46%
Susquehanna Polling	March 5-March 10, 2008	Hillary Clinton	47%	John McCain	44%
Strategic Vision	March 7-March 9, 2008	Hillary Clinton	42%	John McCain	48%
Survey USA	February 26-February 28, 2008	Hillary Clinton	47%	John McCain	46%
Quinnipiac University	February 21-February 25, 2008	Hillary Clinton	44%	John McCain	42%
Franklin and Marshall College	February 13-February 18, 2008	Hillary Clinton	46%	John McCain	46%
Muhlenberg College	February 9-February 17, 2008	Hillary Clinton	42%	John McCain	43%
Rasmussen Reports	February 14, 2008	Hillary Clinton	42%	John McCain	44%
Quinnipiac University	February 6-February 12, 2008	Hillary Clinton	46%	John McCain	40%

=== Rhode Island ===
4 electoral votes

Poll Source	Date administered	Democrat	%	Republican	%
Survey USA	February 26-February 28, 2008	Hillary Clinton	54%	John McCain	37%
Brown University	February 9-February 10, 2008	Hillary Clinton	43%	John McCain	32%

=== South Carolina ===
8 electoral votes

Poll Source	Date administered	Democrat	%	Republican	%
Survey USA	February 26-February 28, 2008	Hillary Clinton	42%	John McCain	48%

=== South Dakota ===
3 electoral votes

Poll Source	Date administered	Democrat	%	Republican	%
Rasmussen Reports	March 4, 2008	Hillary Clinton	38%	John McCain	50%
Survey USA	February 26-February 28, 2008	Hillary Clinton	40%	John McCain	52%

=== Tennessee ===
11 electoral votes

Poll Source	Date administered	Democrat	%	Republican	%
Rasmussen Reports	April 3, 2008	Hillary Clinton	38%	John McCain	52%
Survey USA	February 26-February 28, 2008	Hillary Clinton	46%	John McCain	46%
Middle Tennessee State University	February 11-February 23, 2008	Hillary Clinton	38%	John McCain	45%

=== Texas ===
34 electoral votes

Poll Source	Date administered	Democrat	%	Republican	%
Baselice & Associates	May 20-May 25, 2008	Hillary Clinton	36%	John McCain	51%
Research 2000/ Daily Kos	May 5-May 7, 2008	Hillary Clinton	38%	John McCain	53%
Rasmussen Reports	May 1, 2008	Hillary Clinton	43%	John McCain	49%
Public Strategies/ WFAA Dallas/BELO	February 28-March 1, 2008	Hillary Clinton	46%	John McCain	50%
Survey USA	February 26-February 28, 2008	Hillary Clinton	42%	John McCain	49%
Survey USA	February 23-February 25, 2008	Hillary Clinton	43%	John McCain	49%

=== Utah ===
5 electoral votes

Poll Source	Date administered	Democrat	%	Republican	%
Deseret News/ Dan Jones & Associates	May 13-May 19, 2008	Hillary Clinton	20%	John McCain	65%
Survey USA	February 26-February 28, 2008	Hillary Clinton	27%	John McCain	65%

=== Vermont ===
3 electoral votes

Poll Source	Date administered	Democrat	%	Republican	%
Survey USA	February 26-February 28, 2008	Hillary Clinton	49%	John McCain	39%

=== Virginia ===
13 electoral votes

Poll Source	Date administered	Democrat	%	Republican	%
Virginia Commonwealth University	May 12-May 18, 2008	Hillary Clinton	38%	John McCain	47%
Rasmussen Reports	May 8, 2008	Hillary Clinton	41%	John McCain	47%
Survey USA	April 11-April 13, 2008	Hillary Clinton	39%	John McCain	55%
Rasmussen Reports	March 27, 2008	Hillary Clinton	36%	John McCain	58%
Survey USA	March 14-March 16, 2008	Hillary Clinton	47%	John McCain	47%
Survey USA	February 26-February 28, 2008	Hillary Clinton	40%	John McCain	50%
Rasmussen Reports	February 19, 2008	Hillary Clinton	41%	John McCain	51%
Survey USA	February 15-February 17, 2008	Hillary Clinton	45%	John McCain	48%
Survey USA	January 16-January 17, 2008	Hillary Clinton	43%	John McCain	52%

=== Washington ===
11 electoral votes

Poll Source	Date administered	Democrat	%	Republican	%
Elway Poll	May 26-May 29, 2008	Hillary Clinton	41%	John McCain	36%
Rasmussen Reports	May 12, 2008	Hillary Clinton	47%	John McCain	42%
Survey USA	May 12, 2008	Hillary Clinton	49%	John McCain	45%
Survey USA	April 14-April 16, 2008	Hillary Clinton	48%	John McCain	45%
Survey USA	April 7, 2008	Hillary Clinton	45%	John McCain	46%
Rasmussen Reports	March 27, 2008	Hillary Clinton	43%	John McCain	46%
Elway Poll	March 18-March 20, 2008	Hillary Clinton	38%	John McCain	41%
Survey USA	March 14-March 16, 2008	Hillary Clinton	50%	John McCain	45%
Rasmussen Reports	February 28, 2008	Hillary Clinton	40%	John McCain	48%
Survey USA	February 26-February 28, 2008	Hillary Clinton	44%	John McCain	46%
Survey USA	February 3-February 4, 2008	Hillary Clinton	46%	John McCain	46%

=== West Virginia ===
5 electoral votes

Poll Source	Date administered	Democrat	%	Republican	%
Survey USA	February 26-February 28, 2008	Hillary Clinton	47%	John McCain	42%

=== Wisconsin ===
10 electoral votes

Poll Source	Date administered	Democrat	%	Republican	%
Rasmussen Reports	May 5, 2008	Hillary Clinton	43%	John McCain	47%
University of Wisconsin	April 15-April 24, 2008	Hillary Clinton	44%	John McCain	47%
Survey USA	April 11-April 13, 2008	Hillary Clinton	46%	John McCain	46%
Wisconsin Public Radio/ St. Norbert College	March 25-April 5, 2008	Hillary Clinton	42%	John McCain	46%
Rasmussen Reports	March 26, 2008	Hillary Clinton	39%	John McCain	50%
Survey USA	February 14-February 16, 2008	Hillary Clinton	46%	John McCain	45%
Survey USA	February 26-February 28, 2008	Hillary Clinton	48%	John McCain	44%
Rasmussen Reports	February 21, 2008	Hillary Clinton	38%	John McCain	50%
Survey USA	February 15-February 17, 2008	Hillary Clinton	42%	John McCain	49%
Survey USA	January 20-January 21, 2008	Hillary Clinton	45%	John McCain	49%

=== Wyoming ===
3 electoral votes

Poll Source	Date administered	Democrat	%	Republican	%
Survey USA	February 26-February 28, 2008	Hillary Clinton	28%	John McCain	61%

== Latest results (using latest polling when available) ==
The numbers in parentheses indicate the number of electoral votes awarded to each state. A simple majority of electoral votes (270 out of 538) is needed to secure the presidency.

=== John McCain vs. Hillary Clinton ===
- President Elect: Hillary Clinton
  26 states and DC (324 electoral votes)
  - Arkansas (6)
  - California (55)§
  - Connecticut (7)§
  - Delaware (3)§
  - D.C. (3)R§
  - Florida (27)
  - Hawaii (4)§
  - Illinois (21)§
  - Indiana (11)§
  - Kentucky (8)§
  - Maine (4)§
  - Maryland (10)§
  - Massachusetts (12)§
  - Minnesota (10)
  - Missouri (11)
  - Nevada (5)
  - New Hampshire (4)
  - New Jersey (15)
  - New Mexico (5)
  - New York (31)§
  - Ohio (20)
  - Oregon (7)
  - Pennsylvania (21)
  - Rhode Island (4)§
  - Vermont (3)§
  - Washington (11)
  - West Virginia (5)§
- Second Place: John McCain
  23 states (198 electoral votes)
  - Alabama (9)§
  - Alaska (3)§
  - Arizona (10)§
  - Colorado (9)
  - Georgia (15)§
  - Idaho (4)§
  - Iowa (7)
  - Kansas (6)§
  - Louisiana (9)§
  - Mississippi (6)§
  - Montana (3)§
  - Nebraska (5)§
  - North Carolina (15)
  - North Dakota (3)§
  - Oklahoma (7)§
  - South Carolina§ (8)
  - South Dakota (3)§
  - Tennessee (11)§
  - Texas (34)§
  - Utah (5)§
  - Virginia (13)
  - Wisconsin (10)
  - Wyoming (3)§
- Too close to call
  1 state (17 electoral votes)
  - Michigan (17)

Notes:

- "R" indicates a state where the only current (2008) data is The Rasmussen Reports Balance of Power Calculator
- "§" indicates a state that is listed as a safe Republican/Democratic state by The Rasmussen Reports Balance of Power Calculator. Red color (§) indicates a state that listed safe but is in the opposite column.

== See also ==
- Statewide opinion polling for the United States presidential election, 2008
- Nationwide opinion polling for the Democratic Party 2008 presidential candidates
- Statewide opinion polling for the Democratic Party presidential primaries, 2008
- Nationwide opinion polling for the Republican Party 2008 presidential candidates
- Statewide opinion polling for the Republican Party presidential primaries, 2008
