= Mike Gravel 2008 presidential campaign =

American campaign for Democratic and Libertarian nominations

Mike Gravel for President 2008
- Campaign: U.S. presidential election, 2008
- Candidate: Mike Gravel; U.S. Senator from Alaska (1969–1981); Speaker of the Alaska House of Representatives (1965–1967)
- Affiliation: Democratic Party; Libertarian Party
- Status: Withdrawn
- Announced: April 17, 2006
- Suspended: March 26, 2008
- Headquarters: Arlington, Virginia
- Key people: Chris Petherick (Chief of Staff); April Shapley (Dep. Chief of Staff); Alex Colvin (Press Secretary); Jon Kraus (New Hampshire State Organizer); J. Skyler McKinley (Deputy Communications Director); Christopher S. Thrasher (National Campaign Coordinator)
- Receipts: (2007-12-31)
- Slogan: Let the People Decide

Website
- www.gravel2008.us (Archived on September 17, 2012)

The 2008 presidential campaign of Mike Gravel, former Speaker of the Alaska House of Representatives and United States Senator from Alaska, began on April 17, 2006, when he declared his candidacy for the Democratic nomination for President of the United States in the 2008 election, in a speech to the National Press Club.

His campaign gained an Internet following and national attention due to outspoken debate appearances during 2007, but consistently showed little support in national polls. In the 2008 Democratic caucuses and primaries, he did not win any delegates. Out of the eight candidates for the Democratic nomination for president, he received the fewest votes - less than one percent.

In March 2008, Gravel announced that he had joined the Libertarian Party and would seek its presidential nomination, instead of further pursuing the Democratic nomination. In May 2008, Gravel finished fourth at the 2008 Libertarian National Convention, leading to his exit from politics until his 2020 presidential campaign.

== Announcement ==
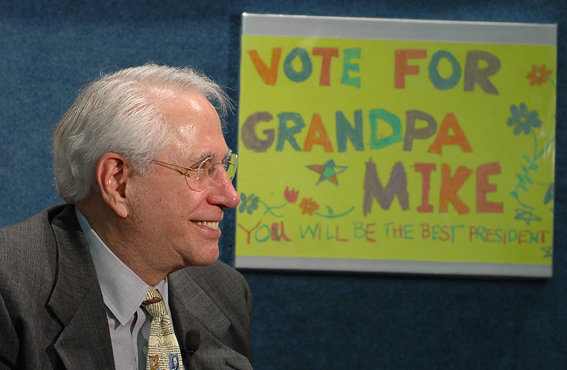
Mike Gravel at the launch of his presidential campaign on April 17, 2006

On April 17, 2006, Gravel became the first candidate for the Democratic nomination for President of the United States in the 2008 election, announcing his run in a speech to the National Press Club in Washington, D.C. Short on campaign cash, he took public transportation to get to his announcement.

Gravel had spoken out against the war in Iraq since before the invasion of that country began in March 2003. In his announcement he called for immediate cessation of US military involvement in Iraq via his own-drafted U.S. Armed Forces Withdrawal From Iraq Act, and offered a strategy he claimed would get it passed. He unequivocally denounced any possible war with Iran. His announced campaign platform was centered on systemic changes to the U.S. system. Foremost among these were:

- The National Initiative for Democracy, a Constitutional amendment and proposed federal statute that would recognize a fourth branch of the US federal government in addition to the judicial, executive and legislative branches, namely the people via direct democracy, enabled to directly initiate and pass legislation and to amend the Constitution of the United States on their own.
- A national sales tax that would replace the income tax and the Internal Revenue Service.

Gravel's initial campaign also emphasized his support for a single-payer national health care system, term limits, nuclear disarmament, and same-sex marriage recognition.

== Campaign developments 2006 ==
Although Gravel's candidacy was little-noticed by the national media, at its outset he campaigned almost full-time in New Hampshire (the first primary state). He garnered broader awareness and interest through his occasional television appearances, netroots campaigning, participation in Party forums (such as the Democratic Presidential Candidates Forum and Democratic National Committee (DNC) Winter Conference), and up until October 30 in Philadelphia, the string of televised debates sponsored by the DNC and others.

Gravel was interviewed for the Blue State Observer weblog on June 27, 2006. On that occasion he expressed his support for constitutional change in aid of citizen-initiated legislation, he declaimed the existence of limitations upon the conduct of stem cell research, and stated he was against the widespread deportation of illegal immigrants then being advocated by conservative talk radio and other elements.

An August 2006 media release draws attention to the candidate's public opposition to the prospect of war in Iraq expressed as long ago as the early months of 2002.

The campaign and/or candidate attracted mainstream coverage in The New York Times, The Reno Gazette-Journal, on CBS News, on ABC News, in The Progressive, and in The American Spectator/

Gravel delivered an address before the New Hampshire Institute of Politics at Saint Anselm College in November 2006 which has been recorded and published on video.

The campaign website included participation forums. A video section of the campaign website linked to videos of some media appearances, his address to the New Hampshire Institute of Politics, a September 2006 appearance at the 'Camp Democracy' activist forum in Washington D.C., as well as the introductory video from his successful 1968 Senate campaign.

The candidate has maintained his own weblog since October 2006, and began blogging at The Huffington Post in June 2007 as well. The Gravel campaign also had its own YouTube channel featuring more than 80 videos of the candidate's past speeches and campaign appearances.

== Campaign developments 2007 ==
=== First quarter ===
Gravel's address before the DNC National Winter Conference in early February 2007 was received – enthusiastically, claimed campaign advocates – and was broadcast on C-SPAN. In speaking he offered harsh judgments against President Bush and the Senate Democratic leadership, and implicitly his presidential rivals Joe Biden, Hillary Clinton, and John Edwards, saying "anyone who voted for the war on October 11 based upon what President Bush presented to them is not qualified to hold the office of President of the United States." Gravel was interviewed on MSNBC at the time. He also appeared as a guest of a video weblog directed from New Jersey answering questions about netroots and the blogosphere.

Senator Gravel was interviewed on Toniq TV where he forthrightly expressed views supporting the lifting of restrictions against the service of identified gays and lesbians in the US military. Calling comparison to President Harry S. Truman's racial desegregation of the US military in 1948, he criticized former President Bill Clinton as 'dead wrong' and 'mousy' for his innovation of the 'don't ask don't tell' policy covering homosexual conduct by military members:

When Clinton got to be President, well, the first he's doing is standing there on two legs waffling back and forth, oh, don't tell us you're gay. What are you talking about? If you had any knowledge of history, ancient history, in Sparta they encouraged homosexuality because they fight for the people they love. And if it's your partner and you love them, you're prepared to die for them, and that's the same ethic you see in the military today. It's not the country. It's my partner. Go see the movies on war, and it's always the person next to me who is in my foxhole with me. Well, I got to tell you, extend that a little further and you'll see why the Spartans trained their people to be homosexuals, because they're better fighters.

On February 11, 2007, the senator addressed the Jefferson County Presidents Day Dinner in Watertown, Wisconsin.

On February 13, 2007, the senator released a statement outlining his views on the possibility of impeachment proceedings against President George W. Bush, regarding it as 'not sufficient' and favoring a congressional inquiry which could ultimately lead to criminal charges being brought against the President.

Senator Gravel participated in the AFSCME Democratic Presidential Forum on February 21, 2007, in Carson City, Nevada, at the Carson City Community Center. He appears toward the end of the video of the broadcast of the event.

In the Carson City Forum, he roundly condemned President Bush's policy of military involvement in Iraq and reminded those present of his statements warning of lies and distortions about Iraq's supposed unlawful weapons of mass destruction as far back as early 2002 (the time of the occurrence of the first signs of the Bush Administration's formulation of an agenda for military action against Iraq). He decried the overall level of military spending as opposed to the funding of education and of what he regarded as the consequent, poor educational outcomes achieved.

Senator Gravel called on congressional Democrats to force a 'constitutional crisis' by denying all further budgetary appropriations in aid of continued American military involvement in Iraq. He further argued that the income tax should be 'wiped out' in favor of the FairTax proposal - which imposes a progressive sales tax on newly manufactured items varying from 19% to 23% while providing 'prebates' to 'untax' families spending on necessities, up to the poverty level. He stated his view that experience showed income taxes were successfully 'gamed' by the wealthy at the expense of the poor and middle income earners. And he voiced his support for the constitutional and legal reform necessary to effect the National Initiative as a means of enabling citizen-initiated national lawmaking.

Senator Gravel also spoke in favor of public financial assistance for campaigning presidential candidates.

On February 26, 2007, Senator Gravel was interviewed about his campaign on the American C-SPAN network's Washington Journal program.

In a February 25, 2007 Washington Post/ABC News nationwide poll of voters who lean Democratic, 0% supported Gravel for the Democratic presidential nomination. Indeed, through February 2007, such opinion polls of contenders for the Democratic nomination all showed Gravel with a 1% or less support level.

At the close of the first quarter 2007 reporting period, the campaign committee had $498 in cash against debts and obligations amounting to $88,515.

=== Second quarter ===
Because of his time in the Senate, Gravel was invited to many of the early Democratic presidential debates. The first Democratic debate of the pre-primary season was in the evening of April 26, 2007, in Orangeburg, South Carolina, at South Carolina State University. State party chairman Joe Erwin said that he chose South Carolina State because it is an historically black college, noting that African Americans have been the "most loyal" Democrats in the state. The debate was 90 minutes with a 60-second time limit for answers, and no opening or closing statements. It was broadcast via cable television and online video streaming by MSNBC. The debate was moderated by Brian Williams of NBC Nightly News.

Gravel appeared with the seven other contenders for the Democratic nomination for president. He stated that the Iraq War had the effect of creating more terrorists and that the "war was lost the day that George Bush invaded Iraq on a fraudulent basis." He maintained that an end to the war could be affected by a bill passed in the House and a Senate filibuster on such a bill defeated by a daily vote on cloture, but that the will to do so was lacking. Further, he suggested a bill requiring the president to withdraw from Iraq on pain of criminal penalties. He said the recent threat of a pre-emptive nuclear strike in the "war on terror" was immoral and would be dropped under a Gravel administration, and that America has no important military enemies and it is the influence of the military-industrial complex that has conditioned Americans to think of the world in terms of enemies. He characterized the CIA overthrow of democracy in Iran in the 1950s lies as the root of U.S. problems with that country. Overall, he said that all American armed forces who died in Vietnam died in vain and American armed forces in Iraq were dying in vain. Regarding his fellow candidates, he said, "I got to tell you, after standing up with them, some of these people frighten me — they frighten me."

Media stories about the debate said that Gravel was responsible for much of whatever "heat" and "flashpoints" had taken place. Gravel gained considerable publicity by shaking up the normally staid multiple-candidate format; The New York Times' media critic said that what Gravel had done was "steal a debate with outrageous, curmudgeonly statements." The Internet was a benefit: a YouTube video of his responses in the debate was viewed more than 225,892 times, ranking seventeenth in most views for week and first among news and politics clips; his name became the fifteenth most searched-for in the blogosphere; and his website garnered more traffic than those of frontrunners Hillary Clinton, Barack Obama, or John Edwards. Gravel appeared on the popular Colbert Report on television on May 2, and his campaign and career were profiled in national publications such as Salon.

All of this did not help his poll ratings: a May 2007 CNN poll showed him with less than 0.5 percent support among Democrats.

Stills from Gravel's "Rock" campaign video of him staring into the camera (left) and throwing a rock into a lake (right)

In late May 2007, two wordless, avant-garde campaign videos, "Rock" and "Fire", created by Otis College of Art and Design staff Matt Mayes and Guston Sondin-Klausner, were released on YouTube and became hits. The first, nearly three minutes long, showed Gravel staring at the camera silently for more than one minute, then throwing a large rock into a lake and slowly walking away, with a sole graphic showing the campaign website. The second, nearly eight minutes long, briefly showed Gravel walking through a forest collecting wood and looking at the resultant campfire, then for the remaining seven minutes just showed the fire burning, with the website graphic superimposed. These videos would eventually gain over 480,000 and 140,000 views respectively. "Rock" was given airtime during an episode of The Daily Show with Jon Stewart.

WMUR-TV, CNN, and the New Hampshire Union Leader hosted both Democratic and Republican debates in Goffstown, New Hampshire, at Saint Anselm College. The Democratic debate was Sunday, June 3, starting at 7 PM EDT and lasting two hours, commercial free. The moderator was Wolf Blitzer, host of Late Edition and The Situation Room. He was joined by Tom Fahey of the Union Leader and Scott Spradling from the local NH television station WMUR. The first half of the debate was a directed question and answer, with candidates at podiums, as in the first debate, responding to questions from Fahey and Spradling.

On March 17, 2007, CNN, the New Hampshire Union Leader and WMUR-TV had formally decided to exclude former Senator Gravel from debates between Democratic presidential candidates they would be sponsoring in New Hampshire. The decision was decried as "censorship, unbecoming a free society", and on May 1 the decision was reversed, and Gravel was invited to be a participant. The venue was Saint Anselm College and the debate was nationally televised on CNN.

Gravel reiterated many of his past foreign policy points during the debate, and emphasized that Biden, Clinton, Dodd, and Edwards voted for the resolution under which the invasion and occupation of Iraq were undertaken and Edwards co-sponsored it. Gravel claimed that the history of Southeast Asia after U.S. withdrawal showed Iraq withdrawal would not necessarily be dire, and that the insurgency in Iraq was successful because it had the support of the Iraqi people. He said that the fact that the other candidates knew, or should have known, that there were "two sets of books" being kept on intelligence from Iraq, and that they voted the resolution that authorized the war in spite of that fact, indicates that morality plays no part in their political decisions and that lack of moral judgment ought to keep them from the presidency.

Two of eight candidates, Hillary Clinton and Barack Obama, were accorded greater talk-time than the moderator. Barack Obama was accorded the greatest talk-time at 16 full minutes, 2.85 times the talk-time accorded Gravel, who was accorded the least talk-time at 5.62 minutes.

On June 28, 2007, in Washington, D.C., PBS held and televised a debate at Howard University, an historically black college. The moderator was Tavis Smiley. All eight candidates discussed various topics including education, poverty, unemployment, racial discrimination, and health in the black community. The debate drew a record crowd of celebrities, such as Harry Belafonte, Al Sharpton, Dorothy Heights, Jesse Jackson, Terry McMillan, Judge Hatchett, and Mark Ridley-Thomas.

Gravel's points in the debate included that the "war on drugs" was a failure. He asserted that the prison population of the US had increased 1285% over the past 35 years and that 70% of that population is African-American. Gravel compared the legal basis for the war on drugs to Prohibition, claimed that it made criminals of people who otherwise were not criminals, and that they were disproportionately African-American. Gravel asserted that the money spent on the war in Iraq could have built 4 million houses thus helping victims of Hurricane Katrina, or financed 21 million four-year college scholarships, or hired 7.6 million new teachers. Gravel said that the income tax code was especially open to corruption. That the tax code was now so complicated and corrupted that no one alive understood it. He said that with his alternative, progressive sales tax proposal everyone would know what everyone else was paying in taxes. Gravel said that equal justice before the law would only be possible if the people were empowered as lawmakers. Gravel asserted that Free Trade Agreements benefited corporate management and shareholders but hurt most people on both sides to the agreement.

This was the first debate during which all the candidates were accorded equal time. The earlier debates were heavily biased toward the 'Top-tier' candidates.

By the second-quarter 2007 close, the committee had $31,141 in cash on hand, and had collected a total of $175,229 in net contributions during the entire 2008 election cycle.

=== Third quarter ===
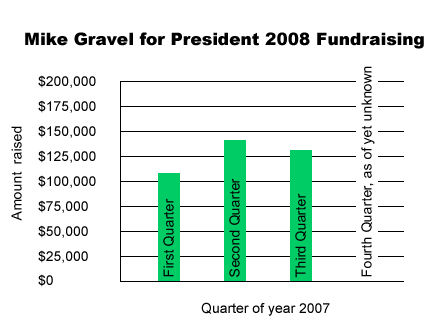
Gravel's fundraising efforts for the first three quarters of 2007.

On July 12, 2007, in Detroit, Michigan, all eight candidates attended a debate held during the NAACP convention. John Edwards and Hillary Clinton were overheard—on stage, over microphones—conferring about weeding those candidates not in the 'Top-tier' out of future debates.

On July 23, 2007, in Charleston, South Carolina, the CNN-YouTube Presidential Debates took place for the Democrats, on the campus of The Citadel. All questions were selected from among, and posed as videos submitted via YouTube by members of the public; the debate was moderated by Anderson Cooper of Anderson Cooper 360. YouTube and Google streamed the event live. It was also simulcast on CNN en Español.

Two of eight candidates, Hillary Clinton and Barack Obama, were accorded greater talk-time than the moderator. Barack Obama was accorded the greatest talk-time at 15.18 minutes, 3.64 times the talk-time accorded Gravel, who was accorded the least talk-time at 4.17 minutes. Gravel responded to audience applause when he had complained of a lack of airtime and said: "Thank you. Has it been fair thus far?" Detractors began to liken Gravel to "the cranky uncle who lives in the attic," or "the angry old guy that just seemed to want to become angrier."

Gravel at the Yearly Kos convention at McCormick Place in Chicago on August 4, 2007

On August 4, 2007, the Yearly Kos Presidential Leadership Forum was held in Chicago, Illinois. This informal discussion was attended by seven of the eight presidential candidates, with Joe Biden not attending due to votes in Congress. New York Times Magazine writer Matt Bai and DailyKos Contributing Editor and Fellow Joan McCarter moderated. The debate was broken down into Domestic Policy, Foreign Policy, and Philosophy and Leadership. Candidates were allotted 90 seconds for each question with 45 second rebuttals, although the time limits were not strictly enforced. After the debate, breakout sessions were held where convention goers could question each candidate individually.

Gravel expounded upon the shortcomings of representational government, concluding with, "So the only answer is for you to realize that the answer is not up here on the dais, the answer is with you, the American people, to acquire lawmaking powers." He reiterated that the U.S. Senate had the power to shut down the Iraq War with a series of forced cloture votes if they so chose. And he talked about the effect of the concentration of the media and of money in politics, saying "You gotta keep in mind that all politicians sort of walk in the mud. You know their head may be up here but they walk in the mud. And you have to understand that, because of the way the system is structured, you have to raise money. We're raising hundreds of millions of dollars on this dais for these people to talk to you, when we all know that money is the corrupting agent of politics, and lo and behold the media, which is now controlled in this country by five corporations, is telling us that these people who raise the most, who technically are the most corrupt, are the ones that should get to be elected."

On August 9, 2007, Gravel participated in an LGBT network Logo hosted debate focusing on LGBT issues, moderated by Human Rights Campaign President Joe Solmonese and singer Melissa Etheridge in Los Angeles, California. Gravel was originally excluded from this debate, the reason given that his campaign had not raised enough money to qualify for participation. Rallying from Gravel's supporters reversed this decision.

On August 19, 2007, in Des Moines, Iowa, ABC News in conjunction with the Iowa Democratic Party held a debate streamed on This Week moderated by George Stephanopoulos.

During the course of the debate Gravel reiterated many of his stances against the Iraq War. Asked if he believed in the efficacy of prayer Gravel replied that he believed in love, that love implements courage, and that courage fosters all the other virtues useful in life. Gravel observed that many of the people who pray are the same ones who want to go to war and thus to kill fellow human beings. Gravel said that more love between individual Americans, individual Iowans, would enable more individual courage, and that more courage would enable Americans to grapple with the problems of governance. Gravel also questioned Americans' view of their country as "Number 1" in the world.

Five of eight candidates, Joe Biden, Bill Richardson, John Edwards, Hillary Clinton and Barack Obama, were accorded greater talk-time than the moderator. Barack Obama was accorded the greatest talk-time at 13.17 minutes, 2.7 times the talk-time accorded Gravel, who was accorded the least talk-time at 4.88 minutes. Berkley political scientist David Terr found that moderator George Stephanopoulos directed roughly five percent of his questions to Gravel; In a poll asking who did the best in the debate, Gravel placed seventh among the eight candidates. National opinion polls of contenders for the Democratic nomination continued to show Gravel with one percent or zero percent numbers.

On September 9, 2007, Univision hosted a forum in Spanish at the University of Miami's Bank United Center in Coral Gables, Florida and moderated by Univision's anchors Jorge Ramos and Maria Elena Salinas. Joe Biden did not participate in the debate. During the course of the forum Gravel stated that it was wrong that the father of (Pfc. 3rd Squadron, 3rd Armored Cavalry Regiment) Armando Soriano (age 20, of Houston), killed in Iraq (Feb 1, 2004, in Haditha), was about to be deported. Along with the other candidates Gravel committed to immigration reform in his first year as president. Gravel then charged that the national immigration issue was in fact a case of scapegoating immigrants for other systemic problems in the US, in education and health care for example. Gravel said he was embarrassed that the US was building a wall on its southern border. Gravel charged that CAFTA and NAFTA were the real causes of many of the problems on both sides of the US borders but confessed that he thought remedying those acts would have to await the enactment of the National Initiative for Democracy and the empowerment of US citizens as legislators. Gravel said that instead he would reach out to Hugo Chávez in Venezuela and to Castro leadership in Cuba as well. Reminded that health problems had forced Gravel into bankruptcy, Gravel was asked how he would apply his personal experience to the problem of health care. Gravel outlined his plan for healthcare vouchers, paid for out of general revenues, to be applied against premiums of up to five private plans and one government plan, each with identical defined benefits, each mandated to allow freedom of choice of provider.

All candidates were accorded equal talk times at the Univision forum.

A September 11, 2007 Los Angeles Times/Bloomberg poll found that, among registered South Carolina voters who plan to vote in the Democratic primary or usually vote for Democrats, 2% would vote for Gravel "if the presidential primary were held today". Candidates Chris Dodd, Dennis Kucinich, and Bill Richardson each got 1% of respondents to that question. Additionally in the same poll of South Carolina voters, in response to the question, "Regardless of your choice for president, who do you think has the best chance of beating the Republican candidate in November…?" Gravel polled 2%, compared to 1% for Joe Biden and Bill Richardson, and 0% for Chris Dodd and Dennis Kucinich.

During mid-September 2007, Yahoo!, in partnership with The Huffington Post, produced a "mashup debate" with Charlie Rose interviewing the candidates. Segments were recorded on September 12, with the "mashups" posted on September 13.

On September 20, 2007, in Davenport, Iowa, PBS held a forum focused on domestic issues, specifically health care and financial security. It was moderated by Judy Woodruff, and was a joint venture between IPTV and the AARP. Barack Obama rejected PBS's invitation. Gravel and Dennis Kucinich were excluded from the debate on the grounds that they did not have at least one paid staff member or office space in Iowa.

On September 26, 2007, in Hanover, New Hampshire, MSNBC held a debate at Dartmouth College in conjunction with New England Cable News and New Hampshire Public Radio. During the course of the debate Gravel reiterated many of his familiar positions on Iraq. When asked his opinion Gravel stated that anyone old enough to fight and die for the nation ought to be able to drink alcohol legally. Asked if he would tax gasoline to reduce national consumption Gravel said that he would tax all carbon based fuels to eliminate the politicians' and bureaucrats' playing favorites in the implementation of such a scheme. As well, he offered that he thought it futile to try to get the Congress to pass such a law, that it would instead require his proposed National Initiative and the empowering of the people to do so. Further he said that the nation could eliminate gasoline as an energy source in 5 years and all carbon based fuels in 10 years if it could just summon the will to do so, substituting wind generated electricity, for instance, for nuclear reactors as a source of power.

None of the eight candidates were accorded greater talk-time than the moderator, who accorded himself 19.42 minutes of talk-time. Hillary Clinton was accorded the second greatest amount of talk-time at 17.62 minutes, 4.1 times the talk-time accorded Gravel, who was accorded the least amount of talk-time at 4.33 minutes.

A September 27–30, 2007 American Research Group Poll showed Gravel with 2%, tied with Joe Biden and ahead of Dennis Kucinich.

By the end of the third-quarter 2007, the committee had $17,526.55 in cash on hand, and had collected a total of $379,794.85 so far during the 2008 election cycle.

=== Fourth quarter ===
On October 1, 2007, Gravel was interviewed on PBS. He described himself as an ordinary guy, and would be more likely to take the train than fly in a private jet. He explained that other leading nations, including Russia, spend just 3%–4% of their budget on defense, while the US defense budget is more than all other nations combined. He then rhetorically asked: "What are we afraid of?" He explained that the defense budget is associated with the military industrial complex. He stated that the US military is internationally competitive, but the US schools and health care system are not. Gravel said that Ralph Nader once referred to him as a "breath of fresh air".

On October 19, it was announced that Gravel was excluded from the next Democratic debate – October 30, 2007, in Philadelphia to be televised on NBC News and MSNBC and held at Drexel University – with the debate sponsors or the Democratic National Committee saying Gravel's campaign had not met fund-raising, polling, or local campaign organizational thresholds. For the Philadelphia exclusion, Gravel blamed corporate censorship on the part of sponsor owner and alleged military-industrial complex member General Electric for his exclusion.

Senator Gravel mounted a counter-gathering and debate against a video screen a short distance away, at Philadelphia's "World Cafe Live" at the same time as, and two blocks from, the Democratic presidential debate from which he was excluded. The debate was shown on a large screen, with Senator Gravel providing a running commentary and later answering audience questions. The event was called "An Alternate October 30th" and initially announced on Gravel's YouTube page.

However, Gravel's exclusion continued for almost all of the subsequent Democratic debates, and he had thus lost his easiest publicity.

At some point, none of the major polls were including Gravel's name in their polling. Despite poor polling numbers, Gravel had positive support among young people and Internet users, however his lowest support came from the constituency. Blind polls suggested that he would garner much more voting support if his positions were more well known.

For the fourth quarter of 2007, Gravel reported no money raised. Following Gravel's exclusion from most of the Democratic debates, and consequent impairment to his monetary turnover, his supporters began organizing "mass donation days" to help the campaign gain momentum and necessary funds, in the manner of Republican presidential candidate Ron Paul. Such planned days included:

- October 30, 2007, in response to the exclusion of Gravel from the debate Philadelphia held a day later;
- December 5, 2007, the anniversary of the Repeal of Prohibition (this day yielded upwards of $10,000 from donations);
- January 1, 2008, using the phrase "Gravel Resolution for Revolution" as a catchphrase and way to publicize; and
- January 27, 2008, the anniversary of the end of U.S. participation in the Vietnam War, in light of Gravel's efforts as a senator.

== Caucuses and primaries 2008 ==
Gravel did not compete in the initial January 3, 2008, vote, the Iowa caucuses, choosing to focus on the New Hampshire primary instead, and received no Iowa state delegates. Nevertheless, he was still subjected to a false report from Keith Olbermann of MSNBC that he had pulled out of the race afterward, as fellow Democratic candidates Chris Dodd and Joe Biden had. Later that night, Gravel's campaign issued a press release and YouTube video denying this, making it clear that Gravel intends to continue his campaign and does not intend to drop out of the race for the presidency. Keith Olbermann later apologized to the Gravel campaign stating that a man named Alex Colvin, Gravel's press secretary, contacted MSNBC news at approximately 11:30 PM. MSNBC double-checked the source and believed the man was who he said he was, and was subsequently read on the air.

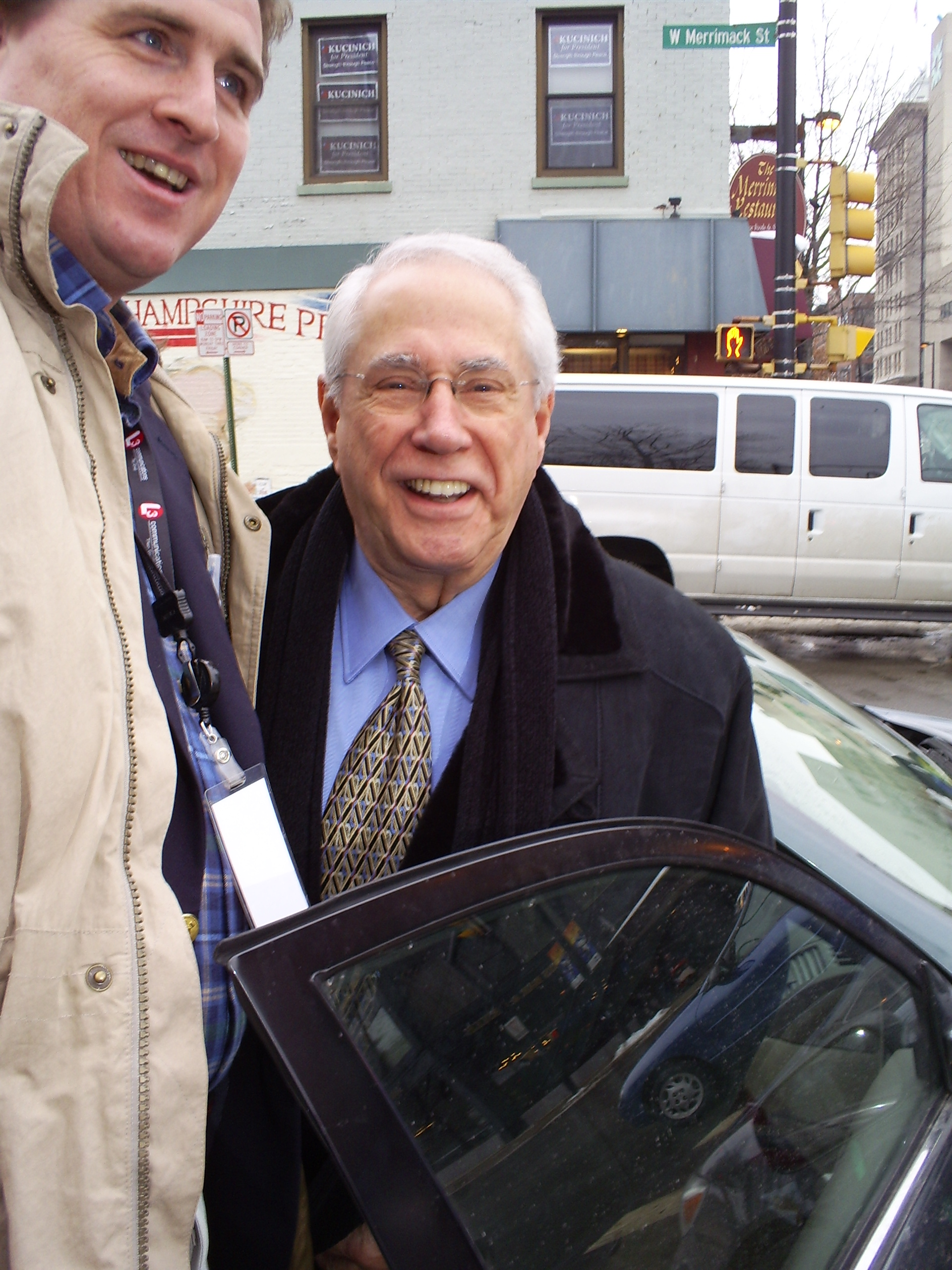
Gravel in Goffstown, New Hampshire, two days before the primary there

Gravel did focus much of his attention on the second 2008 vote, the New Hampshire primary held on January 8, and gained some media attention for a pre-election appearance at Phillips Exeter Academy where he told students that using marijuana was safer than drinking alcohol. In the primary he received 402 votes out of some 280,000 cast, or 0.14 percent. Gravel said he would take some time off from campaigning to deal with a respiratory infection. He subsequently resumed campaigning.

On January 15, 2008, Gravel received 2,363 votes out of 593,837 votes cast in the Michigan primary, or 0.40 percent. Campaigning was light in the Democratic primary due to an intra-party dispute removing several top candidates' names from the ballot.

Gravel did not reach viability in any of the Nevada caucuses in the state on January 19, 2008, and as a result, received no delegates.

On January 26, 2008, Gravel received 214 votes out of 532,468 votes cast in the South Carolina primary, or 0.04 percent.

On January 29, 2008, Gravel finished 8th in the Florida primary, with a little over 5,000 votes. He finished behind 4 candidates who had already withdrawn. This primary too was affected by an intra-party dispute causing several candidates not to campaign.

By the end of January 2008, Hillary Clinton, Barack Obama, and Gravel were the only remaining Democrats from the initial debates still running. Gravel vowed to stay in the presidential campaign until November.

On March 11, 2008, Gravel continued to remain in the Democratic race but additionally endorsed a Green Party candidate for president, Jesse Johnson, saying he wanted to help Johnson prevail against Green Party rivals Cynthia McKinney and Ralph Nader. As March neared a close, Gravel had almost no fundraising and was only on the ballot in one of the next ten Democratic primaries.

== Switch to Libertarian Party 2008 ==
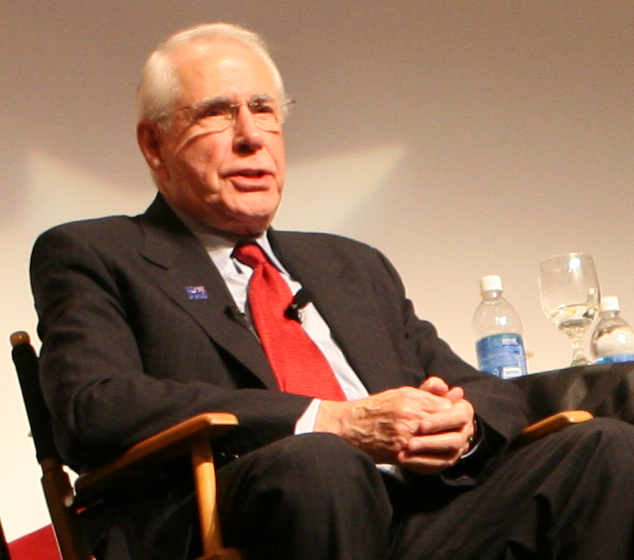
Gravel during a debate at the Libertarian National Convention

On March 26, 2008, Gravel announced that he had abandoned his bid for the Democratic Party nomination and would seek the presidential nomination of the Libertarian Party, stating "I look forward to advancing my presidential candidacy within the Libertarian Party, which is considerably closer to my values, my foreign policy views and my domestic views."

As a Libertarian candidate, Gravel found more support than he had as a Democrat, placing second and third in two April 2008 straw polls.

In the May 25 balloting at the 2008 Libertarian National Convention in Denver, Gravel finished fourth out of eight candidates on the initial ballot, with 71 votes out of 618; he trailed former Congressman and eventual winner Bob Barr, author Mary Ruwart, and businessman Wayne Allyn Root. Gravel's position did not improve subsequently and he was eliminated on the fourth ballot. Afterwards he said, "I just ended my political career. From 15 years old to now, my political career is over, and it's no big deal. I'm a writer, I'm a lecturer, I'm going to push the issues of freedom and liberty. I'm going to push those issues until the day I die."

== Endorsements ==
Gravel had the endorsement of campaign finance reform activist Doris Haddock and received financial contributions from actor Mark Ruffalo.

Noted academic and political dissident Noam Chomsky also endorsed Senator Gravel.
