= Nationwide opinion polling for the 2008 Democratic Party presidential primaries =

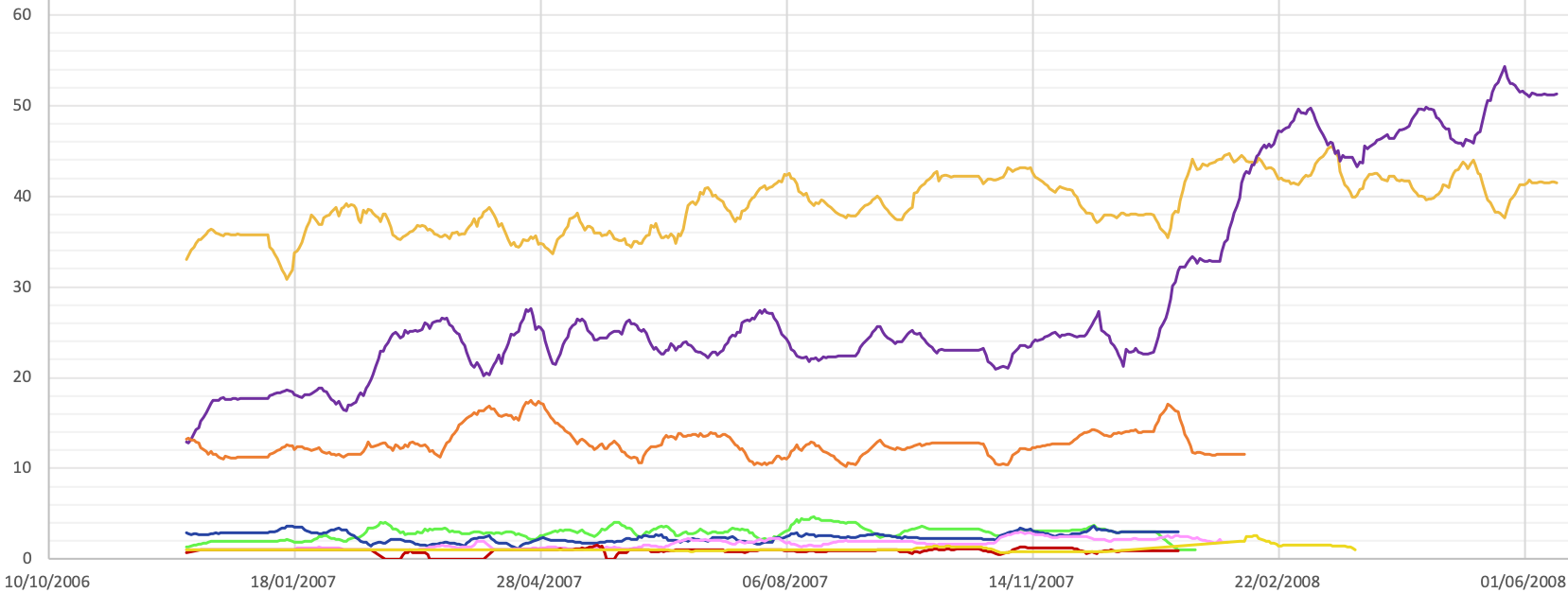
2008 Democratic primary polling

This is a collection of scientific, public nationwide opinion polls that have been conducted relating to the United States Democratic presidential candidates, 2008|2008 Democratic presidential candidates.

== 2008 ==
=== After Jan. ===
Poll source	Sample size	Margin of error	Date(s) administered	Hillary Clinton	Barack Obama	Other	Undecided/None
Gallup	1,279	±3%	May 25–28, 2008	42%	52%	2%	4%
Rasmussen Reports	900	±4%	May 25–28, 2008	44%	47%	–	
Pew Research Center	618	±4.5%	May 21–25, 2008	41%	54%	–	5%
Newsweek	608	±5%	May 21–22, 2008	42%	50%	8%	
Reuters/Zogby	–		May 15–18, 2008	33%	59%	8%	
Quinnipiac University	–		May 8–12, 2008	41%	45%	–	14%
ABC News/Washington Post	620	±4%	May 8–11, 2008	41%	53%	4%	2%
USA Today/Gallup	516		May 1–4, 2008	51%	44%	5%	
Ipsos Public Affairs	514	±4.3%	Apr. 30–May 4, 2008	47%	40%	1%	12%
CBS News/New York Times	283	±5%	May 1–3, 2008	38%	50%	–	9%
Diageo/Hotline	374	±5.1%	Apr. 30–May 3, 2008	37%	48%	5%	8%
CNN/Opinion Research	441	±4.5%	Apr. 28–30, 2008	45%	46%	–	9%
Fox News/Opinion Dynamics	400	±5%	Apr. 28–29, 2008	44%	41%	8%	7%
CBS News/New York Times	402	±5%	Apr. 25–29, 2008	38%	46%	–	14%
NBC News/WSJ	–	±4.2%	Apr. 25–28, 2008	43%	46%	4%	7%
Pew Research Center	651	±4.5%	Apr. 23–27, 2008	45%	47%	–	8%
Associated Press/Ipsos	457	±4.6%	Apr. 23–27, 2008	43%	46%	5%	6%
Newsweek	592	±5%	Apr. 24–25, 2008	41%	48%	11%	
USA Today/Gallup	552	±5%	Apr. 18–20, 2008	40%	50%	2%	8%
Newsweek	588	±5%	Apr. 16–17, 2008	35%	54%	11%	
ABC News/Washington Post	643	±4%	Apr. 10–13, 2008	41%	51%	3%	5%
Reuters/Zogby	532	±4.3%	Apr. 10–12, 2008	38%	51%	–	
Associated Press/Ipsos	489	±4.4%	Apr. 7–9, 2008	43%	46%	3%	8%
CBS News/New York Times	469	–	March 28–Apr. 2, 2008	43%	46%	3%	8%
Diageo/Hotline	342	±5.3%	March 28–31, 2008	38%	50%	6%	6%
NBC News/WSJ	384	–	March 24–25, 2008	45%	45%	2%	8%
Pew Research Center	618	±3%	March 19–22, 2008	39%	49%	–	12%
Fox News/Opinion Dynamics	388	±5%	March 18–19, 2008	30%	31%	24%	14%
CBS News	1,067	±3%	March 15–18, 2008	37%	39%	10%	14%
USA Today/Gallup	530	±5%	March 14–16, 2008	42%	49%	2% (Note: Mike Gravel with 1%, Other with 1%)	8%
CNN/Opinion Research	463	±4.5%	March 14–16, 2008	45%	52%	–	
Reuters/Zogby	525	±4.4%	March 13–14, 2008	44%	47%	–	
NBC News/WSJ	–		March 7–10, 2008	47%	43%	–	
ABC News/Washington Post	629	±4%	Feb. 28 – March 2, 2008	43%	50%	7%	–
Los Angeles Times/Bloomberg	–		Feb. 21–25, 2008	42%	48%	5%	5%
Associated Press/Ipsos	473	±4.6%	Feb. 22–24, 2008	43%	46%	5%	6%
USA Today/Gallup	1,009	±3%	Feb. 21–24, 2008	39%	51%	–	
Pew Research	633	–	Feb. 20–24, 2008	40%	49%	2%	9%
CBS News/New York Times	427	±5%	Feb. 20–24, 2008	38%	54%	1%	7%
Fox News	–	±3%	Feb. 19–20, 2008	44%	44%	2%	9%
Diageo/Hotline	361	±5.1%	Feb. 14–17, 2008	45%	43%	2%	9%
Reuters/Zogby	494	±4.5%	Feb. 13–16, 2008	38%	52%	–	
Associated Press/Ipsos	520	±4.3%	Feb. 7–10, 2008	46%	41%	–	
USA Today/Gallup'''‡'''	525	±5.0%	Feb. 8–9, 2008	44%	47%	4% (Note: Mike Gravel with 3%, Other with 1%)	6%
Newsweek'''†'''	602	±3%	Feb. 6–7, 2008	41%	42%	–	17%
CNN/Opinion Research*	500	±4.5%	Feb. 1–3, 2008	46%	49%	–	
Gallup'''*'''	1,239	±3.0%	Feb. 1–3, 2008	47%	43%	4% (Note: Mike Gravel with 2%, Other with 2%)	6%
Rasmussen Reports'''*'''	900	±4%	Jan. 31 – Feb. 3, 2008	46%	40%	–	
CBS News/New York Times*	491	±3.0%	Jan. 31 – Feb. 2, 2008	41%	41%	–	14%
Cook Political Report/RT Strategies*	376	±3.1%	Jan. 31 – Feb. 2, 2008	37%	43%	3%	17%
USA Today/Gallup*	985	±4.0%	Jan. 30 – Feb. 2, 2008	45%	44%	–	

=== Jan. 2008 ===
Poll source	Date(s) administered	Hillary Clinton	John Edwards	Barack Obama	Other	Undecided/None	"Other" Candidates
ABC/Washington Post Margin of Error: ± 3.0%	Jan. 30 – Feb. 1, 2008	47%	2%	43%	5%	[data missing]	
USA Today/Gallup Margin of Error: ± 3.0%	Jan. 25–27, 2008	44%	14%	33%	2%	8%	Other 2%
NBC News/WSJ Margin of Error: ± 3.1%	Jan. 20–22, 2008	47%	12%	32%	4%	5%	Dennis Kucinich 3%, None 1%
Los Angeles Times/Bloomberg	Jan. 18–22, 2008	42%	11%	33%	2%	12%	Dennis Kucinich 1%, Other 1%
"Diageo/Hotline" (PDF). Archived from the original (PDF) on February 8, 2008. (55.8 KiB)	Jan. 10–12, 2008	38%	13%	35%	2%	[data missing]	Dennis Kucinich 2%
CBS/NYT Poll	Jan. 9–12, 2008	42%	11%	27%	4%	13%	Dennis Kucinich 4%
ABC/Washington Post	Jan. 9–12, 2008	52%	11%	37%	2%	3%	Dennis Kucinich 2%
CNN/Opinion Research	Jan. 9–10, 2008	49%	12%	36%	1%	2%	Dennis Kucinich 1%
USA Today/Gallup	Jan. 4–6, 2008	33%	20%	33%	4%	[data missing]	Dennis Kucinich 3%, Bill Richardson 1%
Rasmussen Reports	Jan. 3–6, 2008	33%	20%	29%	18%	[data missing]	Other Response 18%

== 2007 ==
Poll source	Date(s) administered	Joe Biden	Hillary Clinton	John Edwards	Al Gore	Barack Obama	Bill Richardson	Other/Undecided/None	"Other" Candidates	
Rasmussen Reports	Dec. 17–20, 2007	3%	39%	17%	–	27%	3%	3%	[data missing]	Dennis Kucinich 3%
Reuters/Zogby/ARG	Dec. 12–14, 2007	3%	40%	13%	–	32%	3%	1%	[data missing]	Chris Dodd 1%
Diageo/Hotline	Dec. 10–14, 2007	2%	35%	14%	–	30%	2%	–	[data missing]	
Rasmussen Reports	Dec. 9–12, 2007	–	36%	13%	–	28%	–	–	[data missing]	
CNN/Opinion Research	Dec. 6–9, 2007	4%	40%	14%	–	30%	4%	4%	4%	Dennis Kucinich 2%, Chris Dodd 2%
Rasmussen Reports	Dec. 6–9, 2007	–	38%	13%	–	27%	–	–	[data missing]	
Rasmussen Reports	Dec. 3–6, 2007	–	33%	15%	–	26%	–	–	[data missing]	
Rasmussen Reports	Nov. 30–Dec 3, 2007	–	37%	15%	–	24%	–	–	[data missing]	
USA Today/Gallup	Nov. 30–Dec 2, 2007	4%	39%	15%	–	24%	4%	–	[data missing]	
Rasmussen Reports	Nov. 16–19, 2007	–	42%	13%	–	23%	–	–	[data missing]	
Reuters/Zogby/ARG	Nov. 14–17, 2007,	2%	38%	13%	–	27%	3%	2%	[data missing]	Dennis Kucinich 2%
CNN/Opinion Research	Nov 2–4, 2007	3%	44%	14%	–	25%	4%	5%	[data missing]	Chris Dodd 2%, Dennis Kucinich 2%, Mike Gravel 1%
Newsweek	Oct. 31–Nov. 1, 2007	4%	43%	12%	–	24%	3%	4%	[data missing]	Dennis Kucinich 4%
Reuters/Zogby/ARG	Oct 24–27, 2007	2%	38%	12%	–	24%	2%	5%	18%	Dennis Kucinich 2%, Chris Dodd <1%, Mike Gravel <1%, Someone else 2%
CBS News	Oct 26, 2007	–	45%	7%	–	16%	–	–	[data missing]	
Rasmussen Reports	Sep 28 – Oct 1, 2007	–	37%	13%	32%	22%	–	–	[data missing]	
American Research Group	Sep 27–30, 2007	2%	53%	13%	–	20%	3%	3%	[data missing]	Mike Gravel 2%, Dennis Kucinich 1%
AP-Ipsos	Sep 21–25, 2007	–	40%	12%	–	26%	4%	–	[data missing]	
Rasmussen Reports	Sep 20–23, 2007	–	40%	15%	–	28%	3%	–	[data missing]	
Reuters/Zogby	Sep 13–16, 2007	3%	35%	10%	–	21%	3%	–	[data missing]	
Cook Political Report/RT Strategies	Sep 13–16, 2007	1%	34%	12%	10%	22%	2%	8%	12%	Dennis Kucinich 2%, Chris Dodd 1%, Other 2%
Cook Political Report/RT Strategies	Sep 13–16, 2007	2%	37%	14%	–	24%	3%	11%	15%	Dennis Kucinich 2%, Chris Dodd 1%, Mike Gravel 1%, Other 2%
ABC News/Washington Post	Sep 4–7, 2007	3%	41%	14%	–	27%	2%	4%	10%	Dennis Kucinich 2%, Chris Dodd 1%, Mike Gravel 1%
Fox News	Aug 21–22, 2007	2%	35%	6%	10%	23%	3%	4%	17%	Dennis Kucinich 3%, Chris Dodd 1%
Quinnipiac University	Aug 7–13, 2007	2%	36%	9%	15%	21%	3%	1%	11%	Dennis Kucinich 1%
American Research Group	Aug 9–12, 2007	–	36%	16%	–	21%	7%	–	[data missing]	
Rasmussen Reports	Aug 6–12, 2007	2%	40%	13%	–	25%	4%	4%	[data missing]	Dennis Kucinich 2%, Chris Dodd 1%, Mike Gravel 1%
American Research Group	Aug 6–12, 2007, MoE ± 4	4%	36%	16%	–	21%	7%	3%	[data missing]	Chris Dodd 1%, Mike Gravel 1%, Dennis Kucinich 1%
Rasmussen Reports	July 31 – Aug 6, 2007	3%	43%	14%	–	22%	3%	5%	[data missing]	Dennis Kucinich 3%, Mike Gravel 1%, Chris Dodd 1%
USA Today/Gallup	Aug 3–5, 2007	3%	42%	10%	18%	19%	3%	2%	4%	Dennis Kucinich 1%, Someone else 1%
USA Today/Gallup	Aug 3–5, 2007	3%	48%	12%	–	27%	4%	1%	5%	Dennis Kucinich 1%, Someone else 2%
Cook Political Report/RT Strategie	Aug 2–5, 2007	1%	39%	8%	10%	21%	4%	3%	14%	Dennis Kucinich 1%, Other 2%
Cook Political Report/RT Strategie	Aug 2–5, 2007	2%	43%	10%	–	23%	5%	3%	14%	Dennis Kucinich 1%, Other 2%
Newsweek	Aug 1–2, 2007	3%	44%	14%	–	23%	1%	7%	7%	Dennis Kucinich 2%, Mike Gravel 1%, Chris Dodd 1%, None 4%
NBC News/WSJ	July 27–30, 2007	5%	43%	13%	–	22%	6%	6%	5%	Dennis Kucinich 2%, Chris Dodd 1%, Other (vol.) 1%, None (vol.) 2%
Pew Research Center	July 25–29, 2007	2%	40%	11%	12%	21%	2%	6%	6%	Dennis Kucinich 2%, Chris Dodd 1%, Other (vol.) 1%, None (vol.) 2%
Diageo/Hotline	July 19–22, 2007	2%	39%	11%	–	30%	2%	8%	8%	Dennis Kucinich 3%, All of these (vol.) 1%, None of these (vol.) 4%
ABC News/Washington Post	July 18–21, 2007	2%	39%	9%	14%	28%	2%	5%	2%	Dennis Kucinich 1%, None of these (vol.) 2%, Wouldn't vote (vol.) 2%
ABC News/Washington Post	July 18–21, 2007	2%	45%	12%	–	30%	3%	7%	2%	Dennis Kucinich 1%, Chris Dodd 1%, None of these (vol.) 2%, Other 1%, Wouldn't vote 2%
FOX News/Opinion Dynamics	July 17–18, 2007	1%	39%	9%	9%	23%	2%	6%	11%	Dennis Kucinich 3%, Other (vol.) 1%, Wouldn't vote (vol.) 2%
FOX News/Opinion Dynamics	July 17–18, 2007	1%	41%	12%	–	25%	2%	7%	13%	Dennis Kucinich 4%, Mike Gravel 0%, Other (vol.) 1%, Wouldn't vote (vol.) 2%
USA Today/Gallup	July 12–15, 2007	3%	34%	9%	16%	25%	4%	2%	6%	Christopher Dodd 1%, Dennis Kucinich 1%
USA Today/Gallup	July 12–15, 2007	3%	40%	13%	–	28%	5%	2%	8%	Christopher Dodd 1%, Dennis Kucinich 1%
Zogby America	July 12–14, 2007	1%	37%	11%	–	25%	3%	4%	18%	Dennis Kucinich 2%, Someone else 2%
Harris Interactive	July 6–13, 2007	2%	35%	14%	13%	28%	5%	3%	[data missing]	Dennis Kucinich 2%, Wesley Clark 1%
American Research Group	July 9–12, 2007	2%	38%	16%	–	25%	3%	4%	12%	Wesley Clark 1%, Chris Dodd 1%, Dennis Kucinich 1%, Mike Gravel 1%
Rasmussen Reports	July 9–12, 2007	2%	38%	13%	–	26%	3%	5%	13%	Dennis Kucinich 2%, Chris Dodd 2%, Mike Gravel 1%
Associated Press/Ipsos	July 9–11, 2007	2%	36%	11%	15%	20%	2%	5%	9%	Chris Dodd 1%, None 4%
USA Today/Gallup	July 6–8, 2007	3%	37%	13%	16%	21%	2%	3%	5%	Dennis Kucinich 2%, Mike Gravel 1%
USA Today/Gallup	July 6–8, 2007	4%	42%	16%	–	26%	4%	3%	5%	Dennis Kucinich 2%, Mike Gravel 1%
Rasmussen Reports	June 25–28, 2007	3%	39%	13%	–	26%	5%	4%	9%	Joe Biden 3%, Dennis Kucinich 3%, Chris Dodd 1%
FOX News/Opinion Dynamics	June 26–27, 2007	1%	42%	14%	14%	19%	1%	7%	6%	Dennis Kucinich 2%, Chris Dodd 1%, Mike Gravel 1%, Wouldn't vote (vol.) 3%
FOX News/Opinion Dynamics	June 26–27, 2007	2%	47%	13%	–	21%	3%	8%	7%	Dennis Kucinich 2%, Chris Dodd 1%, Mike Gravel 1%, Other (vol.) 1%, Wouldn't vote (vol.) 3%
CNN/Opinion Research	June 22–24, 2007	2%	35%	13%	16%	23%	4%	1%	[data missing]	Dennis Kucinich 1%
CNN/Opinion Research	June 22–24, 2007	3%	43%	17%	–	25%	5%	2%	[data missing]	Joseph Biden 3%, Dennis Kucinich 2%
Cook Political Report/RT Strategies	June 21–23, 2007	2%	32%	11%	12%	22%	1%	5%	15%	Joe Biden 2%, Dennis Kucinich 2%, Chris Dodd 1%, Other (vol.) 2%
Cook Political Report/RT Strategies	June 21–23, 2007	3%	35%	15%	–	24%	1%	6%	17%	Joe Biden 3%, Dennis Kucinich 2%, Chris Dodd 1%, Other (vol.) 3%
Newsweek	June 20–21, 2007	1%	43%	14%	–	27%	2%	6%	7%	Dennis Kucinich 3%, Michael Bloomberg 1%, Joe Biden 1%, Chris Dodd 1%, Other 1%
Rasmussen Reports	June 18–21, 2007	4%	37%	13%	–	25%	4%	4.5%	13%	Joe Biden 4%, Dennis Kucinich 3%, Chris Dodd 1%, Mike Gravel 0.5%
Cook Political Report/RT Strategies	June 15–17, 2007	–	30%	13%	9%	20%	3%	5%	20%	Chris Dodd 1%, Dennis Kucinich 1%, Mike Gravel 1%, Other (vol.) 2%
Cook Political Report/RT Strategies	June 15–17, 2007	1%	32%	16%	–	22%	4%	4%	21%	Chris Dodd 1%, Dennis Kucinich 1%, Mike Gravel 1%, Other (vol.) 2%
USA Today/Gallup	June 11–14, 2007	3%	33%	11%	18%	21%	5%	3%	7%	Dennis Kucinich 1%, Mike Gravel 1%, Someone else 1%
USA Today/Gallup	June 11–14, 2007	3%	39%	13%	–	26%	5%	3%	8%	Dennis Kucinich 1%, Mike Gravel 1%, Someone else 1%
Rasmussen Reports	June 11–14, 2007	2%	38%	16%	–	27%	3%	3%	[data missing]	Chris Dodd 1%, Dennis Kucinich 1%, Mike Gravel 1%
American Research Group	June 9–12, 2007	3%	39%	13%	–	19%	5%	5%	[data missing]	Wesley Clark 2%, Dennis Kucinich 1%, Chris Dodd 1%, Mike Gravel 1%
NBC News/WSJ	June 8–11, 2007	4%	39%	15%	–	25%	4%	4%	[data missing]	Dennis Kucinich 3%, Chris Dodd 1%
Quinnipiac University	June 5–11, 2007	1%	35%	9%	18%	21%	2%	3%	11%	Joe Biden 1%, Dennis Kucinich 1%, Other (vol.) 1%, Wouldn't vote 1%
Los Angeles Times/Bloomberg	June 7–10, 2007	5%	33%	8%	15%	22%	4%	4%	9%	Dennis Kucinich 2%, Chris Dodd 1%, Other (vol.) 1%
FOX News/Opinion Dynamics	June 5–6, 2007	1%	36%	12%	14%	23%	1%	2%	[data missing]	Dennis Kucinich 1%, Mike Gravel 1%
FOX News/Opinion Dynamics	June 5–6, 2007	2%	41%	15%	–	26%	1%	4%	[data missing]	Dennis Kucinich 2%, Chris Dodd 1%, Mike Gravel 1%
AP/Ipsos	June 4–6, 2007	1%	33%	12%	20%	21%	3%	–	[data missing]	
USA Today/Gallup	June 1–3, 2007	3%	29%	11%	17%	30%	3%	–	[data missing]	
USA Today/Gallup	June 1–3, 2007	4%	37%	13%	–	36%	4%	1%	[data missing]	Mike Gravel 1%
ABC News/Washington Post	May 29–June 1, 2007	2%	35%	8%	17%	23%	2%	2%	[data missing]	Chris Dodd 1%, Dennis Kucinich 1%
Rasmussen Reports	May 21–23, 2007	–	35%	14%	–	26%	5%	–	[data missing]	
Zogby International	May 17–20, 2007	2%	39%	11%	–	24%	2%	4%	17%	Dennis Kucinich 1%, Someone else 3%
Diageo/Hotline	May 16–20, 2007	–	31%	10%	13%	21%	2%	6%	16%	Dennis Kucinich 2%, Any/all of these (vol.) 2%, None of these (vol.) 2%
Rasmussen Reports	May 14–17, 2007	–	35%	18%	–	25%	5%	–	[data missing]	
Cook Political Report/RT Strategies	May 11–13, 2007	1%	35%	11%	10%	24%	2%	4%	12%	Chris Dodd 2%, Dennis Kucinich 1%, Mike Gravel 1%, Other (vol.) 1%
USA Today/Gallup	May 10–13, 2007	2%	35%	12%	16%	26%	2%	4%	4%	Wesley Clark 1%, Al Sharpton 1%, Christopher Dodd 1%, Someone else 1%
USA Today/Gallup	May 10–13, 2007	2%	42%	14%	–	28%	3%	5%	6%	Wesley Clark 1%, Al Sharpton 1%, Christopher Dodd 1%, Dennis Kucinich 1%, Someone else 1%
Rasmussen Reports	May 7–10, 2007	–	35%	14%	–	33%	3%	–	[data missing]	
CNN/Opinion Research	May 4–6, 2007	2%	38%	12%	12%	24%	5%	3%	[data missing]	Chris Dodd 2%, Dennis Kucinich 1%
USA Today/Gallup	May 4–6, 2007	2%	38%	12%	14%	23%	2%	4%	4%	Wesley Clark 1%, Dennis Kucinich 1%, Someone else 1%, None (vol.) 1%
USA Today/Gallup	May 4–6, 2007	2%	45%	14%	–	27%	3%	8%	5%	Wesley Clark 1%, Dennis Kucinich 1%, Someone else 1%, Unsure/None 5%
WNBC/Marist	Apr 26 – May 1, 2007	2%	35%	15%	9%	17%	3%	2%	17%	Dennis Kucinich 1%, Chris Dodd 1%
Quinnipiac University	Apr 25 – May 1, 2007	2%	32%	12%	14%	18%	3%	4%	15%	Dennis Kucinich 2%, Chris Dodd 1%, Other (vol.) 1%
Cook Political Report/RT Strategies	Apr. 27–29, 2007	2%	32%	16%	11%	23%	4%	1%	12%	Chris Dodd 1%
NBC News/WSJ	Apr. 20–23, 2007	3%	36%	20%	–	31%	2%	1%	[data missing]	Dennis Kucinich 1%
Pew Research Center	Apr. 18–22, 2007	1%	34%	18%	14%	24%	1%	1%	7%	Dennis Kucinich 1%
Rasmussen Reports	Apr. 16–19, 2007	1%	32%	17%	–	32%	3%	2%	[data missing]	Chris Dodd 1%, Wesley Clark 1%
Fox News/Opinion Dynamics	Apr. 17–18, 2007	1%	41%	12%	16%	20%	2%	3%	[data missing]	Dennis Kucinich 2%, Chris Dodd 1%
USA Today/Gallup	Apr. 13–15, 2007	1%	31%	16%	15%	26%	3%	7%	3%	Al Sharpton 2%, Wesley Clark 1%, Mike Gravel 1%, Dennis Kucinich 1%, Christopher Dodd 1%, None (vol.) 1%
USA Today/Gallup	Apr. 13–15, 2007	2%	37%	19%	–	29%	4%	7%	3%	Wesley Clark 2%, Al Sharpton 2%, Mike Gravel 1%, Dennis Kucinich 1%, Christopher Dodd 1%, Someone else 1%, None (vol.) 1%
Washington Post/ABC News	Apr. 12–15, 2007	–	37%	14%	17%	20%	–	–	[data missing]	
CNN/Opinion Research	Apr. 10–12, 2007	1%	30%	12%	15%	26%	3%	6%	[data missing]	Wesley Clark 3%, Dennis Kucinich 1%, Chris Dodd 1%, Al Sharpton 1%
LA Times/Bloomberg	Apr. 9–12, 2007	1%	33%	14%	13%	23%	3%	–	[data missing]	
American Research Group	Apr. 9–12, 2007	2%	36%	19%	–	24%	2%	3%	[data missing]	Wes Clark 1%, Chris Dodd 1%, Dennis Kucinich 1%
USA Today/Gallup	Apr. 2–5, 2007	1%	38%	15%	14%	19%	2%	7%	5%	Wes Clark 3%, Mike Gravel 1%, Someone else 2%, None (vol.) 1%
USA Today/Gallup	Apr. 2–5, 2007	2%	43%	18%	–	19%	3%	7%	7%	Wes Clark 3%, Mike Gravel 1%, Someone else 2%, None (vol.) 1%
Rasmussen Reports	Apr. 2–5, 2007	–	34%	15%	–	29%	4%	–	[data missing]	
Cook Political Report	Mar 29 – Apr 1, 2007	4%	41%	19%	–	17%	3%	–	[data missing]	
Rasmussen Reports	March 26–29, 2007	–	33%	17%	–	26%	4%	–	[data missing]	
Fox News/Opinion	March 27–28, 2007	1%	36%	13%	14%	18%	2%	3%	[data missing]	Dennis Kucinich 2%, Joe Biden 1%
Zogby America	Mar. 22–26, 2007	2%	32%	13%	–	22%	2%	3%	[data missing]	Dennis Kucinich 1%
USA Today/Gallup	Mar. 23–25, 2007	1%	35%	14%	17%	22%	3%	4%	4%	Joe Biden 1%, Wesley Clark 1%, None (vol.) 2%
USA Today/Gallup	Mar. 23–25, 2007	2%	42%	17%	–	24%	4%	5%	5%	Joe Biden 2%, Wesley Clark 2%, Dennis Kucinich 1%, None (vol.) 2%
Pew Research Center	Mar. 21–25, 2007	1%	35%	16%	12%	26%	1%	3%	6%	None (vol.) 3%
Rasmussen Reports	Mar. 19–22, 2007	–	37%	17%	–	25%	3%	–	[data missing]	
Rasmussen Reports	Mar. 12–15, 2007	3%	35%	11%	–	30%	5%	3%	[data missing]	
Time	Mar. 9–12, 2007	1%	34%	10%	13%	26%	2%	3%	[data missing]	Dennis Kucinich 2%, Al Sharpton 1%
CNN	Mar. 9–11, 2007	1%	37%	12%	14%	22%	3%	2%	[data missing]	Wesley Clark 1%, Dennis Kucinich 1%
Rasmussen Reports	Mar. 5–8, 2007	–	38%	15%	–	26%	3%	–	[data missing]	
Associated Press-Ipsos	Mar. 5–7, 2007	1%	38%	10%	14%	21%	4%	–	[data missing]	
American Research Group	Mar. 2–5, 2007	1%	34%	15%	–	31%	2%	3%	[data missing]	Wesley Clark 1%, Christopher Dodd 1%, Dennis Kucinich 1%
NBC News/WSJ	Mar. 2–5, 2007	2%	40%	15%	–	28%	5%	3%	[data missing]	Wesley Clark 1%, Christopher Dodd 1%, Dennis Kucinich 1%
USA Today/Gallup	Mar. 2–4, 2007	3%	36%	9%	18%	22%	1%	3%	[data missing]	Wesley Clark 2%, Mike Gravel 1%
Rasmussen Reports	Feb 26 – Mar 1, 2007	3%	34%	15%	–	26%	3%	–	[data missing]	
FOX News/Opinion Dynamics	Feb 27–28, 2007	1%	34%	12%	14%	23%	1%	1%	[data missing]	Dennis Kucinich 1%
Time	Feb 23–26, 2007	2%	36%	11%	13%	24%	3%	2%	[data missing]	Dennis Kucinich 1%, Al Sharpton 1%
ABC News/Washington Post	Feb 22–25, 2007	1%	36%	12%	14%	24%	3%	–	[data missing]	
Zogby Poll	Feb 22–24, 2007	2%	33%	12%	–	25%	5%	1%	[data missing]	Wesley Clark 1%
Rasmussen Reports	Feb 19–22, 2007	3%	37%	13%	–	26%	4%	–	[data missing]	
Quinnipiac University	Feb 13–19, 2007	1%	38%	6%	11%	23%	2%	3%	[data missing]	Wesley Clark 2%, Dennis Kucinich 1%
Cook Political Report/RT Strategies	Feb 15–18, 2007	1%	42%	16%	–	20%	5%	4%	[data missing]	Wesley Clark 1%, Mike Gravel 1%, Dennis Kucinich 1%, Tom Vilsack 1%
Rasmussen Reports	Feb 12–15, 2007	–	28%	11%	10%	24%	–	–	[data missing]	
WNBC/Marist	Feb 12–15, 2007	2%	37%	11%	11%	17%	2%	3%	[data missing]	Wesley Clark 1%, Mike Gravel 1%, Al Sharpton 1%
USA Today/Gallup	Feb 9–11, 2007	1%	40%	13%	14%	21%	4%	2%	[data missing]	Wesley Clark 1%, Christopher Dodd 1%
Times Union/Siena College Poll	Feb 6–9, 2007	1%	45%	10%	10%	12%	2%	1%	[data missing]	Dennis Kucinich 1%
Rasmussen Reports	Feb 5–8, 2007	–	28%	13%	8%	23%	–	–	[data missing]	
Rasmussen Reports	Jan 29 – Feb 3, 2007	3%	34%	10%	10%	18%	–	3%	[data missing]	Wesley Clark 3%
FOX News/Opinion Dynamics	Jan 30–31, 2007	4%	43%	12%	11%	15%	2%	–	[data missing]	
Time	Jan 22–23, 2007	2%	40%	11%	9%	21%	4%	7%	[data missing]	John Kerry 4%, Christopher Dodd 1%, Dennis Kucinich 1%, Al Sharpton 1%
CNN/Opinion Research	Jan 19–21, 2007	3%	34%	15%	10%	18%	2%	12%	[data missing]	John Kerry 5%, Wesley Clark 2%, Dennis Kucinich 2%, Christopher Dodd 1%, Al Sharpton 1%, Tom Vilsack 1%
ABC News/Washington Post	Jan 16–19, 2007	3%	41%	11%	10%	17%	1%	10%	[data missing]	John Kerry 8%, Wesley Clark 1%, Dennis Kucinich 1%
Gallup	Jan 12–14, 2007	5%	29%	13%	11%	18%	3%	12%	[data missing]	John Kerry 8%, Wesley Clark 2%, Christopher Dodd 1%, Al Sharpton 1%
Rasmussen Reports	Jan 8–11, 2007	4%	22%	15%	7%	21%	–	4%	[data missing]	John Kerry 4%

== Before 2007 ==
Poll source	Date(s) administered	Joe Biden	Hillary Clinton	John Edwards	Al Gore	John Kerry	Barack Obama	Other	Undecided	"Other" Candidates
USA Today/Gallup	Dec 11–14, 2006	3%	33%	8%	12%	6%	20%	7%	[data missing]	Wesley Clark 2%, Bill Richardson 2%, Evan Bayh 1%, Christopher Dodd 1%, Tom Vilsack 1%
NBC News/WSJ	Dec 8–11, 2006	4%	37%	14%	–	11%	18%	5%	[data missing]	Evan Bayh 3%, Bill Richardson 2%
ABC News/Washington Post	Dec 7–11, 2006	2%	39%	12%	10%	7%	17%	5%	[data missing]	Bill Richardson 2%, Evan Bayh 1%, Wesley Clark 1%, Tom Vilsack 1%
CNN/Opinion Research	Dec 5–7, 2006	2%	37%	14%	14%	7%	15%	6%	10%	Bill Richardson 2%, Wesley Clark 2%, Tom Vilsack 1%, Evan Bayh 1%
FOX News/Opinion Dynamics	Dec 5–6, 2006	2%	33%	8%	11%	6%	12%	6%	[data missing]	Evan Bayh 2%, Tom Vilsack 2%, Wesley Clark 1%, Bill Richardson 1%
WNBC/Marist	Nov 27 – Dec 3, 2006	3%	33%	14%	13%	5%	12%	4%	[data missing]	Evan Bayh 1%, Wesley Clark 1%, Bill Richardson 1%, Tom Vilsack 1%
CNN/Opinion Research	Nov 17–19, 2006	3%	33%	14%	14%	7%	15%	9%	[data missing]	Wesley Clark 4%, Bill Richardson 3%, Evan Bayh 2%
USA Today/Gallup	Nov 9–12, 2006	4%	31%	10%	9%	7%	19%	11%	[data missing]	Wesley Clark 3%, Evan Bayh 2%, Bill Richardson 2%, Tom Daschle 1%, Christopher Dodd 1%, Russ Feingold 1%, Tom Vilsack 1%
Pew Research Center	Nov 9–12, 2006	2%	39%	10%	9%	7%	23%	2%	[data missing]	Russ Feingold 1%, Bill Richardson 1%
Cook Political Report/RT Strategies	Nov 9–12, 2006	4%	39%	11%	–	6%	21%	7%	[data missing]	Wesley Clark 2%, Bill Richardson 2%, Evan Bayh 1%, Russ Feingold 1%, Tom Vilsack 1%
McLaughlin & Associates (R)	Nov 7, 2006	2%	31%	6%	10%	10%	19%	5%	[data missing]	Evan Bayh 1%, Russ Feingold 1%, Bill Richardson 1%
Rasmussen Reports	Nov 4–7, 2006	–	29%	10%	13%	4%	22%	–	[data missing]	
CNN/Opinion Research	Oct 27–29, 2006	2%	28%	13%	13%	12%	17%	7%	[data missing]	Evan Bayh 2%, Russ Feingold 2%, Bill Richardson 2%, Tom Vilsack 1%
WNBC/Marist	Sep 18–20, 2006	5%	35%	10%	16%	9%	–	10%	[data missing]	Tom Daschle 2%, Mark Warner 2%, Evan Bayh 1%, Wesley Clark 1%, Christopher Dodd 1%, Russ Feingold 1%, Bill Richardson 1%, Tom Vilsack 1%
CNN/Opinion Research	Aug 30 – Sep 2, 2006	2%	37%	11%	20%	11%	–	12%	[data missing]	Russ Feingold 3%, Bill Richardson 3%, Mark Warner 3%, Evan Bayh 2%, Tom Vilsack 1%
FOX News/Opinion Dynamics	Aug 29–30, 2006	4%	32%	9%	15%	13%	–	8%	[data missing]	Wesley Clark 4%, Evan Bayh 2%, Mark Warner 2%
Cook Political Report/RT Strategies	Aug 25–27, 2006	5%	32%	11%	19%	9%	–	12%	[data missing]	Russ Feingold 3%, Evan Bayh 2%, Bill Richardson 2%, Mark Warner 2%, Wesley Clark 1%, Christopher Dodd 1%, Tom Vilsack 1%
Pew Research Center	Aug 9–13, 2006	6%	40%	11%	18%	11%	–	8%	[data missing]	Bill Richardson 4%, Russ Feingold 2%, Mark Warner 2%
Cook Political Report/RT Strategies	Jun 1–4, 2006	4%	31%	14%	18%	14%	–		[data missing]	Wesley Clark 3%, Mark Warner 3%, Evan Bayh 2%, Russ Feingold 2%, Bill Richardson 2%, Christopher Dodd 1%, Tom Vilsack 0%
Gallup	Jun 1–4, 2006	4%	36%	12%	16%	11%	–		[data missing]	Wesley Clark 4%, Russ Feingold 3%, Mark Warner 2%
Diageo/Hotline	Apr 19–23, 2006	5%	38%	13%	–	14%	–		[data missing]	Wesley Clark 3%, Russ Feingold 3%, Bill Richardson 2%, Mark Warner 2%, Evan Bayh 1%
FOX News/Opinion Dynamics	Mar 14–15, 2006	4%	43%	11%	12%	10%	–		[data missing]	Wesley Clark 4%, Mark Warner 3%, Evan Bayh 2%
WNBC/Marist	Feb 13–15, 2006	4%	33%	16%	17%	11%	–		[data missing]	Evan Bayh 3%, Wesley Clark 3%, Bill Richardson 3%, Mark Warner 2%
CNN/USA Today/Gallup	Feb 9–12, 2006	5%	39%	12%	13%	15%	–		[data missing]	Mark Warner 5%, Russ Feingold (vol.) 1%
CNN/USA Today/Gallup	Dec 9–11, 2005	8%	43%	14%	–	14%	–		[data missing]	Bill Richardson 3%, Mark Warner 3%, Evan Bayh 1%, Tom Vilsack 1%
Cook Political Report/RT Strategies	Dec 8–11, 2005	7%	33%	15%	–	17%	–		[data missing]	Russ Feingold 4%, Bill Richardson 4%, Mark Warner 4%, Evan Bayh 3%, Wesley Clark 3%, Tom Vilsack 0%
NBC News/WSJ	Dec 6–8, 2005	3%	26%	12%	–	9%	7%	19%	[data missing]	Joe Lieberman 10%, Wesley Clark 3%, Bill Richardson 3%, Evan Bayh 1%, Tim Kaine 1%, Mark Warner 1%
NBC News/WSJ	Nov 4–7, 2005	5%	41%	14%	12%	10%	–	12%	[data missing]	Wesley Clark 4%, Bill Richardson 3%
FOX News/Opinion Dynamics	Oct 12–13, 17, 2005	5%	41%	14%	–	17%	–	7%	[data missing]	Wesley Clark 3%, Evan Bayh 2%, Tom Vilsack 1%, Mark Warner 1%
FOX News/Opinion Dynamics	Sep 27–28, 2005	5%	42%	14%	11%	14%	–	2%	[data missing]	Wesley Clark 1%, Mark Warner 1%
Gallup	Aug 5–7, 2005	8%	41%	15%	–	16%	–	13%	[data missing]	Wesley Clark 5%, Evan Bayh 3%, Bill Richardson 3%, Mark Warner 2%
Zogby Poll	Jun 20–22, 2005	5%	39%	12%	6%	13%	–	17%	[data missing]	Howard Dean 6%, Evan Bayh 4%, Wesley Clark 4%, Bill Richardson 3%
FOX News/Opinion Dynamics	Jun 14–15, 2005	6%	44%	13%	–	17%	–	4%	[data missing]	Wesley Clark 2%, Evan Bayh 1%, Mark Warner 1%
Marist College Poll	Apr 18–21, 2005	7%	40%	16%	–	18%	–	7%	[data missing]	Wesley Clark 4%, Russ Feingold 2%, Bill Richardson 1%
Marist College Poll	Feb 14–16, 2005	5%	39%	15%	–	21%	–	10%	[data missing]	Wesley Clark 4%, Russ Feingold 2%, Bill Richardson 2%, Evan Bayh 1%, Mark Warner 1%
Ipsos-Public Affairs Poll	Dec 17–19, 2004	–	33%	15%	–	19%	–	11%	[data missing]	Wesley Clark 11%

== Three-way contest ==
Poll Source	Date	Hillary Clinton	John Edwards	John Kerry	Barack Obama	Tom Vilsack
Rasmussen Reports	July 16–22, 2007	38%	14%	–	25%	–
CBS News/New York Times Poll	July 9–17, 2007	43%	16%	–	24%	–
Rasmussen Reports	July 9–15, 2007	38%	13%	–	26%	–
CBS News/New York Times Poll	June 26–28, 2007	48%	11%	–	24%	–
Rasmussen Reports	June 4–7, 2007	37%	11%	–	25%	–
Rasmussen Reports	May 29–31, 2007	34%	15%	–	26%	–
CBS/New York Times Poll	May 18–23, 2007	46%	14%	–	24%	–
Rasmussen Reports	Apr 30 – May 3, 2007	34%	16%	–	26%	–
Rasmussen Reports	Apr 23–26, 2007	30%	17%	–	32%	–
USA Today/Gallup	Apr 13–15, 2007	37%	19%	–	29%	–
Rasmussen Reports	Apr 9–12, 2007	32%	16%	–	30%	–
CBS News/New York Times Poll	Apr 9–12, 2007	39%	21%	–	24%	–
Time	Apr 5–9, 2007	33%	25%	–	26%	–
CBS News/New York Times Poll	Mar 26–27, 2007	36%	18%	–	28%	–
Time	Feb 23–26, 2007	42%	22%	–	30%	–
Rasmussen Reports	Nov 28 – Dec 4, 2006	34%	–	–	17%	1%
Cook Political Report/RT Strategies	Feb 23–26, 2006	44%	14%	16%	–	–
CNN/USA Today/Gallup	Feb 10, 2005	40%	18%	25%	–	–
CNN/USA Today/Gallup	Feb 4–6, 2005	40%	17%	25%	–	–
USA Today/Gallup	Nov 7–10, 2004	25%	7%	15%	–	–

== Head-to-head polling ==
Poll Source	Date	Hillary Clinton	John Edwards	Al Gore	John Kerry	Barack Obama	Mark Warner
USA Today/Gallup	July 12–15, 2007	54%	–	–	–	42%	–
Newsweek	July 2–3, 2007	56%	–	–	–	33%	–
USA Today/Gallup	June 11–14, 2007	53%	–	–	–	42%	–
USA Today/Gallup	June 1–3, 2007	49%	–	–	–	46%	–
USA Today/Gallup	May 10–13, 2007	54%	–	–	–	40%	–
USA Today/Gallup	May 4–6, 2007	56%	–	–	–	37%	–
Newsweek	May 2–3, 2007	51%	–	–	–	39%	–
USA Today/Gallup	Apr. 13–15, 2007	53%	–	–	–	41%	–
USA Today/Gallup	Apr. 2–5, 2007	61%	–	–	–	33%	–
USA Today/Gallup	March 23–25, 2007	56%	–	–	–	37%	–
NBC News/WSJ	March 2–4, 2007	47%	–	–	–	39%	–
USA Today/Gallup	March 2–4, 2007	56%	–	–	–	36%	–
Newsweek	Feb 28 – Mar 1, 2007	52%	–	–	–	38%	–
FOX News/Opinion Dynamics	Feb 13–14, 2007	49%	–	–	–	32%	–
USA Today/Gallup	Feb 9–11, 2007	62%	–	–	–	33%	–
Newsweek	Jan 24–25, 2007	55%	–	–	–	35%	–
Time	Jan 22–23, 2007	55%	–	–	–	32%	–
CBS News Poll	Jan 18–21, 2007	45%	–	–	–	28%	–
USA Today/Gallup	Jan 12–14, 2007	53%	–	–	–	39%	–
Newsweek	Dec 5–6, 2006	50%	–	–	–	32%	–
FOX News/Opinion Dynamics	Dec 5–6, 2006	52%	–	–	–	30%	–
Newsweek	May 2–3, 2007	57%	38%	–	–	–	–
Newsweek	May 2–3, 2007	–	41%	–	–	49%	–
Newsweek	Feb 28 – Mar 1, 2007	63%	32%	–	–	–	–
Newsweek	Feb 28 – Mar 1, 2007	–	42%	–	–	49%	–
Newsweek	Jan 24–25, 2007	62%	29%	–	–	–	–
Newsweek	Jan 24–25, 2007	–	39%	–	–	46%	–
FOX News/Opinion Dynamics	Dec 5–6, 2006	53%	–	36%	–	–	–
FOX News/Opinion Dynamics	Aug 29–30, 2006	53%	–	34%	–	–	–
Diageo/Hotline	Apr 19–23, 2006	52%	33%	–	–	–	–
Diageo/Hotline	Apr 19–23, 2006	57%	–	–	30%	–	–
Diageo/Hotline	Apr 19–23, 2006	57%	–	29%	–	–	–
Diageo/Hotline	Apr 19–23, 2006	66%	–	–	–	–	15%
USA Today/Gallup	Nov 7–10, 2004	55%	39%	–	–	–	–
Fabrizio, McLaughlin & Associates (R)	Nov 14–16, 2004	46%	28%	–	–	–	–

== Acceptability ==
Poll Source	Date	Democrat	Acceptable	Unacceptable	Unsure/Other
Gallup	Jun 26–29, 2006	John Edwards	71%	25%	4%
Gallup	Jun 26–29, 2006	Hillary Clinton	69%	29%	1%
Gallup	Jun 26–29, 2006	Al Gore	68%	31%	1%
Gallup	Jun 26–29, 2006	John Kerry	59%	40%	1%
Gallup	Jun 26–29, 2006	Joe Biden	44%	37%	19%
Gallup	Dec 8–10, 2006	Barack Obama	42%	11%	47%
Gallup	Jun 26–29, 2006	Wesley Clark	42%	49%	10%
Gallup	Jun 26–29, 2006	Howard Dean	40%	54%	6%
Gallup	Jun 26–29, 2006	Bill Richardson	36%	38%	26%
Gallup	Jun 26–29, 2006	Tom Daschle	35%	50%	15%
Gallup	Jun 26–29, 2006	Russ Feingold	29%	41%	30%
Gallup	Jun 26–29, 2006	Mark Warner	29%	42%	29%
Gallup	Jun 26–29, 2006	Dennis Kucinich	21%	51%	27%
Gallup	Jun 26–29, 2006	Tom Vilsack	19%	47%	35%

== See also ==
- Democratic Party (United States)
- 2008 United States presidential election
- Nationwide opinion polling for the United States presidential election, 2008
