= Statewide opinion polling for the 2024 United States presidential election =

2024 United States presidential election polling
- As of November 4, 2024

Leading presidential candidate by state or district, based on opinion polls. This map only represents polling data. It is not a prediction for the election.
Kamala Harris ▼ Donald Trump
191 3 32 93 77 27 115
Legend
Lead
>12%
8–12%
4–8%
<4%
Leads are based on the average of aggregate polls if available, otherwise on the most recent individual poll if available, otherwise on the result of the previous election.
President before election
Joe Biden
Democratic
Elected President
Donald Trump
Republican

This article is a collection of statewide opinion polls conducted for the 2024 United States presidential election. The people named in the polls were declared candidates or had received media speculation about their possible candidacy.

According to NPR's analysis, the states considered to be not strongly leaning in either direction were Arizona, Georgia, Michigan, Nevada, North Carolina, Pennsylvania, and Wisconsin.

== Limitations ==
Poll results can be affected by methodology, especially in how they predict who will vote in the next election, and re-weighting answers to compensate for slightly non-random samples. One technique, "weighting on recalled vote" is an attempt to compensate for previous underestimates of votes for Donald Trump by rebalancing the sample based on last vote. This can introduce new errors if voters misstate their previous votes. When used for the 2024 presidential election it had produced results closer to the 2020 presidential election than the 2022 mid-term election.

== Forecasts ==
Elections analysts and political pundits issue probabilistic forecasts to give readers a sense of how probable various electoral outcomes are. These forecasts use a variety of factors to determine the likelihood of each candidate winning each state. Most election predictors use the following ratings:

- "tossup": no advantage
- "tilt" (used by some predictors): advantage that is not quite as strong as "lean"
- "lean" or "leans": slight advantage
- "likely": significant, but surmountable, advantage
- "safe" or "solid": near-certain chance of victory

Below is a list of states considered by one or more forecast to be competitive; states that are deemed to be "safe" or "solid" by all forecasters are omitted for brevity.

State	EVs	Last poll closing time (UTC−05:00)	PVI	2020 result	2020 margin	IE November 3, 2024	Cook November 4, 2024	Sabato November 4, 2024	CNN November 4, 2024	DDHQ November 5, 2024	538 November 5, 2024	Economist November 5, 2024
Alaska	3	Nov 6 01:00 am	R+8	52.8% R	10.06%	Solid R	Solid R	Safe R	Solid R	Safe R	Likely R	Safe R
Arizona	11	Nov 5 09:00 pm	R+2	49.4% D	0.31%	Tossup	Tossup	Lean R (flip)	Tossup	Tossup	Lean R (flip)	Lean R (flip)
Colorado	10	Nov 5 09:00 pm	D+4	55.4% D	13.50%	Solid D	Solid D	Solid D	Lean D	Likely D	Solid D	Safe D
Florida	30	Nov 5 08:00 pm	R+3	51.2% R	3.36%	Lean R	Likely R	Likely R	Lean R	Likely R	Likely R	Likely R
Georgia	16	Nov 5 07:00 pm	R+3	49.5% D	0.24%	Tossup	Tossup	Lean R (flip)	Tossup	Tossup	Tossup	Tossup
Iowa	6	Nov 5 09:00 pm	R+6	53.1% R	8.20%	Tilt R	Likely R	Likely R	Solid R	Likely R	Likely R	Likely R
Kansas	6	Nov 5 09:00 pm	R+10	56.1% R	14.63%	Solid R	Solid R	Safe R	Solid R	Safe R	Solid R	Safe R
Maine (Note: Unlike the other 48 states and Washington, D.C., which award all of their electors to the candidate who receives the most votes in that state, Maine and Nebraska award two electors to the winner of the statewide vote and one each to the candidate who receives the most votes in each congressional district.)	2	Nov 5 08:00 pm	D+2	53.1% D	9.07%	Likely D	Likely D	Likely D	Solid D	Safe D	Likely D	Likely D
ME–02	1	Nov 5 08:00 pm	R+6 (Note: District boundaries have changed since the 2020 election.)	52.3% R	7.44%	Lean R	Likely R	Likely R	Lean R	Likely R	Likely R	Likely R
Michigan	15	Nov 5 09:00 pm	R+1	50.6% D	2.78%	Tossup	Tossup	Lean D	Tossup	Tossup	Lean D	Likely D
Minnesota	10	Nov 5 09:00 pm	D+1	52.4% D	7.11%	Lean D	Likely D	Likely D	Lean D	Lean D	Likely D	Likely D
NE–01	1	Nov 5 09:00 pm	R+9	56.0% R	14.92%	Solid R	Solid R	Likely R	Solid R	Safe R	Solid R	Safe R
NE–02	1	Nov 5 09:00 pm	EVEN	52.0% D	6.50%	Lean D	Likely D	Likely D	Lean D	Likely D	Likely D	Likely D
Nevada	6	Nov 5 10:00 pm	R+1	50.1% D	2.39%	Tossup	Tossup	Lean D	Tossup	Tossup	Tossup	Tossup
New Hampshire	4	Nov 5 08:00 pm	D+1	52.7% D	7.35%	Lean D	Likely D	Likely D	Lean D	Likely D	Likely D	Likely D
New Mexico	5	Nov 5 09:00 pm	D+3	54.3% D	10.79%	Solid D	Likely D	Likely D	Lean D	Likely D	Likely D	Likely D
North Carolina	16	Nov 5 07:30 pm	R+3	49.9% R	1.35%	Tossup	Tossup	Lean R	Tossup	Tossup	Tossup	Tossup
Ohio	17	Nov 5 07:30 pm	R+6	53.3% R	8.03%	Likely R	Solid R	Safe R	Solid R	Likely R	Likely R	Safe R
Oregon	8	Nov 5 11:00 pm	D+6	56.4% D	16.08%	Solid D	Solid D	Safe D	Lean D	Safe D	Solid D	Safe D
Pennsylvania	19	Nov 5 08:00 pm	R+2	50.0% D	1.16%	Tossup	Tossup	Lean D	Tossup	Tossup	Tossup	Tossup
Texas	40	Nov 5 09:00 pm	R+5	52.1% R	5.58%	Likely R	Likely R	Likely R	Solid R	Likely R	Likely R	Likely R
Virginia	13	Nov 5 07:00 pm	D+3	54.1% D	10.11%	Likely D	Likely D	Likely D	Lean D	Likely D	Likely D	Likely D
Wisconsin	10	Nov 5 09:00 pm	R+2	49.5% D	0.63%	Tossup	Tossup	Lean D	Tossup	Tossup	Tossup	Tossup
Overall						D – 226; R – 219; 93 tossups	D – 226; R – 219; 93 tossups	D – 276; R – 262; 0 tossups	D – 226; R – 219; 93 tossups	D – 226; R – 219; 93 tossups	D – 241; R – 230; 67 tossups	D – 241; R – 230; 67 tossups

== Alaska ==
Donald Trump vs. Kamala Harris

Poll source	Date(s) administered	Sample size (Note: Key: A – all adults RV – registered voters LV – likely voters V – unclear)	Margin of error	Donald Trump Republican	Kamala Harris Democratic	Other / Undecided
Alaska Survey Research	October 20–22, 2024	1,703 (LV)	± 2.4%	55%	45%	–
Alaska Survey Research	October 8–9, 2024	1,254 (LV)	± 2.9%	54%	46%	–
Cygnal (R) (Note: Poll sponsored by Nick Begich's campaign for U.S. House and the National Republican Congressional Committee)	August 30 – September 1, 2024	400 (LV)	± 4.9%	53%	43%	4%

Donald Trump vs. Kamala Harris vs. Robert F. Kennedy Jr.

Poll source	Date(s) administered	Sample size	Margin of error	Donald Trump Republican	Kamala Harris Democratic	Robert F. Kennedy Jr. Independent	Other / Undecided
Alaska Survey Research	October 20–22, 2024	1,703 (LV)	± 2.4%	51%	43%	7%	–
Alaska Survey Research	October 8–9, 2024	1,254 (LV)	± 2.9%	50%	43%	7%	–
Alaska Survey Research	September 27–29, 2024	1,182 (LV)	± 2.9%	52%	43%	6%	–
Alaska Survey Research	September 11–12, 2024	1,254 (LV)	–	47%	42%	5%	6%

== Arizona ==
Kamala Harris vs. Donald Trump

Aggregate polls

Source of poll aggregation	Dates administered	Dates updated	Kamala Harris Democratic	Donald Trump Republican	Other / Undecided (Note: Calculated by taking the difference of 100% and all other candidates combined.)	Margin
270ToWin	October 22 – November 4, 2024	November 5, 2024	46.8%	48.4%	4.8%	Trump +1.6%
538	through November 4, 2024	November 5, 2024	46.8%	48.9%	4.3%	Trump +2.1%
Silver Bulletin	through November 4, 2024	November 5, 2024	46.9%	49.3%	3.8%	Trump +2.4%
The Hill/DDHQ	through November 4, 2024	November 5, 2024	47.3%	49.9%	2.8%	Trump +2.6%
Average			47.0%	49.1%	3.9%	Trump +2.1%

Poll source	Date(s) administered	Sample size	Margin of error	Kamala Harris Democratic	Donald Trump Republican	Other / Undecided
HarrisX	November 3–5, 2024	1,636 (RV)	± 2.4%	46%	47%	7%
HarrisX	November 3–5, 2024	1,636 (RV)	± 2.4%	49% (Note: With voters who lean towards a given candidate)	51%	–
HarrisX	November 3–5, 2024	1,468 (LV)	± 2.4%	47%	49%	4%
HarrisX	November 3–5, 2024	1,468 (LV)	± 2.4%	49%	51%	–
AtlasIntel	November 3–4, 2024	875 (LV)	± 3.0%	47%	52%	1%
Victory Insights	November 2–3, 2024	750 (LV)	–	48%	49%	3% (Note: "Other" with 2%)
Trafalgar Group (R)	November 1–3, 2024	1,090 (LV)	± 2.9%	47%	49%	4% (Note: "Other" with 1%)
Patriot Polling	November 1–3, 2024	801 (RV)	± 3.0%	48%	51%	1%
InsiderAdvantage (R)	November 1–2, 2024	800 (LV)	± 3.0%	46%	49%	5%
AtlasIntel	November 1–2, 2024	967 (LV)	± 3.0%	46%	52%	2%
Emerson College	October 30 – November 2, 2024	900 (LV)	± 3.3%	48%	50%	2% (Note: "Someone else" with 1%)
Emerson College	October 30 – November 2, 2024	900 (LV)	± 3.3%	48%	51%	1%
The New York Times/Siena College	October 25 – November 2, 2024	1,025 (RV)	± 3.5%	44%	48%	8%
The New York Times/Siena College	October 25 – November 2, 2024	1,025 (LV)	± 3.5%	45%	49%	6%
ActiVote	October 8 – November 1, 2024	400 (LV)	± 4.9%	49%	51%	–
SoCal Strategies (R) (Note: Poll sponsored by On Point Politics & Red Eagle Politics)	October 30–31, 2024	750 (LV)	± 4.0%	49%	50%	1%
AtlasIntel	October 30–31, 2024	1,005 (LV)	± 3.0%	47%	51%	2%
OnMessage Inc. (R)	October 29–31, 2024	800 (LV)	–	47%	50%	3%
YouGov (Note: Poll conducted for The Times, Stanford University, Arizona State University, and Yale University)	October 25–31, 2024	880 (RV)	± 4.4%	49%	50%	1%
YouGov	October 25–31, 2024	856 (LV)	± 4.4%	49%	50%	1%
Morning Consult	October 21−30, 2024	666 (LV)	± 4.0%	48%	48%	4%
Rasmussen Reports (R) (Note: Poll sponsored by American Thinker)	October 25–29, 2024	803 (LV)	± 3.0%	46%	48%	6%
AtlasIntel	October 25–29, 2024	1,458 (LV)	± 3.0%	47%	51%	2%
Mitchell Research & Communications	October 28, 2024	610 (LV)	± 4.0%	48%	50%	2%
RABA Research	October 25–27, 2024	589 (RV)	± 4.0%	45%	43%	12% (Note: "Someone else" with 7%)
Trafalgar Group (R)	October 24–26, 2024	1,094 (LV)	± 2.9%	46%	48%	6%
CES/YouGov	October 1–25, 2024	2,077 (A)	–	49%	49%	2%
CES/YouGov	October 1–25, 2024	2,066 (LV)	–	47%	51%	2%
Marist College	October 17–22, 2024	1,329 (RV)	± 3.5%	49%	49%	2% (Note: "Another party's candidates" with 1%)
Marist College	October 17–22, 2024	1,193 (LV)	± 3.7%	49%	50%	1%
InsiderAdvantage (R)	October 20–21, 2024	800 (LV)	± 3.0%	47%	50%	3%
HighGround	October 19–20, 2024	400 (LV)	± 4.9%	46%	47%	7%
Bloomberg/Morning Consult	October 16–20, 2024	915 (RV)	± 3.0%	49%	49%	2%
Bloomberg/Morning Consult	October 16–20, 2024	861 (LV)	± 3.0%	49%	49%	2%
University of Arizona/Truedot	October 12–20, 2024	846 (RV)	± 3.4%	46%	45%	9% (Note: "Someone else" with 3%)
AtlasIntel	October 12–17, 2024	1,440 (LV)	± 3.0%	49%	49%	2%
CBS News/YouGov	October 11−16, 2024	1,435 (LV)	± 3.3%	48%	51%	1%
Morning Consult	October 6−15, 2024	653 (LV)	± 3.0%	49%	48%	3%
The Washington Post/Schar School	September 30 – October 15, 2024	580 (RV)	± 5.0%	44%	50%	6%
The Washington Post/Schar School	September 30 – October 15, 2024	580 (LV)	± 5.0%	46%	49%	5%
Trafalgar Group (R)	October 10–13, 2024	1,090 (LV)	± 2.9%	46%	48%	6% (Note: "Other" with 3%)
The New York Times/Siena College	October 7–10, 2024	808 (RV)	± 4.0%	45%	51%	4%
The New York Times/Siena College	October 7–10, 2024	808 (LV)	± 4.0%	46%	51%	3%
Fabrizio, Lee & Associates (R)/McLaughlin & Associates (R) (Note: Poll sponsored by Trump's campaign)	October 6–9, 2024	800 (LV)	± 3.5%	46%	49%	5%
Emerson College	October 5–8, 2024	1,000 (LV)	± 3.0%	47%	49%	4%
Emerson College	October 5–8, 2024	1,000 (LV)	± 3.0%	48%	51%	1%
The Wall Street Journal	September 28 – October 8, 2024	600 (RV)	± 5.0%	48%	46%	6%
ActiVote	September 6 – October 8, 2024	400 (LV)	± 4.9%	49%	51%	–
SoCal Strategies (R)	October 5–7, 2024	735 (LV)	–	49%	48%	3%
RMG Research (Note: Poll sponsored by the Napolitan Institute)	September 30 – October 2, 2024	783 (LV)	± 3.5%	46%	50%	4% (Note: "Some other candidate" with 2%)
RMG Research	September 30 – October 2, 2024	783 (LV)	± 3.5%	46%	50%	4%
OnMessage Inc. (R) (Note: Poll conducted for the Article III Project)	September 24 – October 2, 2024	500 (LV)	± 4.4%	45%	47%	8%
Fabrizio Ward (R)/Impact Research (D) (Note: Poll commissioned by AARP)	September 24 – October 1, 2024	600 (LV)	± 4.0%	48%	50%	2%
InsiderAdvantage (R)	September 29–30, 2024	800 (LV)	± 3.0%	48%	49%	1%
HighGround (Note: Poll sponsored by Arizona's Family)	September 26–29, 2024	500 (LV)	± 4.4%	48%	46%	6%
National Research (Note: Poll sponsored by the Democracy Defense Project and Echo Canyon Consulting)	September 25–29, 2024	600 (LV)	± 4.0%	48%	47%	5%
Global Strategy Group (D)/North Star Opinion Research (R) (Note: Poll sponsored by the Peter G. Peterson Foundation)	September 23–29, 2024	400 (LV)	± 4.9%	48%	47%	5%
Emerson College (Note: Poll sponsored by RealClearWorld)	September 27–28, 2024	920 (LV)	± 3.2%	48%	50%	3%
Emerson College	September 27–28, 2024	920 (LV)	± 3.2%	48%	52%	–
AtlasIntel	September 20–25, 2024	946 (LV)	± 3.0%	49%	50%	1%
Cook Political Report/BSG (R)/GS Strategy Group (D)	September 19–25, 2024	409 (LV)	–	50%	48%	2%
Bloomberg/Morning Consult	September 19–25, 2024	977 (RV)	± 3.0%	50%	47%	3%
Bloomberg/Morning Consult	September 19–25, 2024	926 (LV)	± 3.0%	50%	47%	3%
Fox News	September 20−24, 2024	1,021 (RV)	± 3.0%	48%	50%	2%
Fox News	September 20−24, 2024	764 (LV)	± 3.5%	48%	51%	1%
Marist College	September 19−24, 2024	1,416 (RV)	± 3.6%	48%	50%	2%
Marist College	September 19−24, 2024	1,264 (LV)	± 3.8%	49%	50%	1%
Rasmussen Reports (R)	September 19–22, 2024	1,030 (LV)	± 3.0%	47%	49%	4%
The New York Times/Siena College	September 17–21, 2024	713 (RV)	± 4.4%	45%	49%	6%
The New York Times/Siena College	September 17–21, 2024	713 (LV)	± 4.4%	45%	50%	5%
Emerson College	September 15–18, 2024	868 (LV)	± 3.3%	48%	49%	3% (Note: "Someone else" with 2%)
Emerson College	September 15–18, 2024	868 (LV)	± 3.3%	49%	50%	1%
Morning Consult	September 9−18, 2024	862 (LV)	± 3.0%	48%	47%	5%
Trafalgar Group (R)	September 11–12, 2024	1,088 (LV)	± 2.9%	46%	47%	7%
Data Orbital (Note: Poll sponsored by AZ Free News)	September 7–9, 2024	550 (LV)	± 2.9%	46%	46%	8%
Morning Consult	August 30 – September 8, 2024	901 (LV)	± 3.0%	47%	49%	4%
TIPP Insights (Note: Poll sponsored by American Greatness)	September 3–5, 2024	1,015 (RV)	± 3.2%	46%	46%	8%
TIPP Insights	September 3–5, 2024	949 (LV)	± 3.2%	47%	47%	6%
Patriot Polling	September 1–3, 2024	804 (RV)	–	47%	49%	4%
InsiderAdvantage (R)	August 29–31, 2024	800 (LV)	± 3.0%	48%	49%	3%
University of Arizona/Truedot	August 28–31, 2024	1,155 (RV)	–	42%	46%	12% (Note: "Someone else" with 5%)
Emerson College	August 25–28, 2024	720 (LV)	± 3.6%	47%	50%	7%
Emerson College	August 25–28, 2024	720 (LV)	± 3.6%	48%	51%	1%
Bloomberg/Morning Consult	August 23–26, 2024	776 (LV)	± 4.0%	48%	48%	4%
Bloomberg/Morning Consult	August 23–26, 2024	758 (RV)	± 3.0%	48%	48%	4%
Fox News	August 23–26, 2024	1,014 (RV)	± 3.0%	50%	49%	1%
Spry Strategies (R) (Note: Poll sponsored by the American Principles Project)	August 14–20, 2024	600 (LV)	± 4.0%	48%	49%	3%
Rasmussen Reports (R) (Note: Poll sponsored by NumbersUSA)	August 13–17, 2024	1,187 (LV)	± 3.0%	45%	47%	8%
Noble Predictive Insights	August 12–16, 2024	1,003 (RV)	± 3.0%	44%	47%	9%
Focaldata	August 6–16, 2024	702 (LV)	± 3.7%	49%	51%	–
Strategies 360	August 7–14, 2024	400 (RV)	± 4.9%	47%	46%	7%
The New York Times/Siena College	August 8–15, 2024	677 (RV)	± 4.4%	49%	45%	7%
The New York Times/Siena College	August 8–15, 2024	677 (LV)	± 4.4%	50%	45%	5%
Trafalgar Group (R)	August 6–8, 2024	1,092 (LV)	± 2.9%	47%	48%	5%
Navigator Research (D)	July 31 – August 8, 2024	600 (LV)	± 4.0%	46%	49%	5%
Cook Political Report/BSG (R)/GS Strategy Group (D)	July 26 – August 8, 2024	435 (LV)	–	48%	46%	6%
HighGround	July 30 – August 5, 2024	500 (LV)	± 4.4%	44%	42%	14% (Note: "Some other candidate" with 5%)
Public Policy Polling (D) (Note: Poll conducted for Progress Action Fund, which supports Democratic candidates)	July 29–30, 2024	618 (RV)	± 3.9%	47%	49%	4%
Public Opinion Strategies (R) (Note: Poll conducted for Competitiveness Coalition)	July 23–29, 2024	400 (LV)	± 4.9%	43%	48%	9%
Bloomberg/Morning Consult	July 24–28, 2024	804 (RV)	± 3.0%	49%	47%	4%
Emerson College	July 22–23, 2024	800 (RV)	± 3.4%	44%	49%	7%
Emerson College	July 22–23, 2024	800 (RV)	± 3.4%	47%	53%	–
	July 21, 2024	Kamala Harris declares her candidacy.				
InsiderAdvantage (R)	July 15–16, 2024	800 (LV)	± 3.5%	42%	48%	10%
Public Policy Polling (D)	July 10–11, 2024	596 (RV)	–	44%	52%	4%
Bloomberg/Morning Consult	May 7–13, 2024	795 (RV)	± 3.0%	42%	51%	7%
Emerson College	February 16–19, 2024	1,000 (RV)	± 3.0%	40%	48%	12%
The New York Times/Siena College	October 22 – November 3, 2023	603 (RV)	± 4.4%	43%	48%	9%
The New York Times/Siena College	October 22 – November 3, 2023	603 (LV)	± 4.4%	43%	48%	9%

Kamala Harris vs. Donald Trump vs. Cornel West vs. Jill Stein vs. Chase Oliver

Aggregate polls

Source of poll aggregation	Dates administered	Dates updated	Kamala Harris Democratic	Donald Trump Republican	Jill Stein Green	Cornel West Independent	Chase Oliver Libertarian	Others/ Undecided (Note: Calculated by taking the difference of 100% and all other candidates combined.)	Margin
Race to the WH	through October 10, 2024	October 15, 2024	46.4%	48.8%	1.0%	—N/a	0.8%	3.0%	Trump +2.4%
270toWin	October 2 – 12, 2024	October 12, 2024	47.4%	47.6%	1.0%	0.0%	0.5%	3.5%	Trump +0.2%
Average			46.9%	48.1%	1.0%	0.0%	0.8%	3.2%	Trump +1.2%

Poll source	Date(s) administered	Sample size	Margin of error	Kamala Harris Democratic	Donald Trump Republican	Cornel West Independent	Jill Stein Green	Chase Oliver Libertarian	Other / Undecided
HarrisX	November 3–5, 2024	1,636 (RV)	± 2.4%	44%	47%	1%	1%	–	7%
HarrisX	November 3–5, 2024	1,636 (RV)	± 2.4%	46%	50%	2%	2%	–	–
HarrisX	November 3–5, 2024	1,468 (LV)	± 2.4%	46%	49%	1%	1%	–	3%
HarrisX	November 3–5, 2024	1,468 (LV)	± 2.4%	47%	50%	2%	1%	–	–
AtlasIntel	November 3–4, 2024	875 (LV)	± 3.0%	46%	51%	–	1%	0%	2%
AtlasIntel	November 1–2, 2024	967 (LV)	± 3.0%	45%	52%	–	1%	1%	1%
The New York Times/Siena College	October 25 – November 2, 2024	1,025 (RV)	± 3.5%	42%	47%	–	3%	2%	6%
The New York Times/Siena College	October 25 – November 2, 2024	1,025 (LV)	± 3.5%	44%	48%	–	2%	1%	5%
Focaldata	October 3 – November 1, 2024	1,779 (LV)	–	48%	49%	–	1%	1%	1%
Focaldata	October 3 – November 1, 2024	1,603 (RV)	± 2.3%	49%	47%	–	2%	1%	1%
Focaldata	October 3 – November 1, 2024	1,779 (A)	–	49%	47%	–	2%	1%	1%
AtlasIntel	October 30–31, 2024	1,005 (LV)	± 3.0%	46%	51%	–	1%	1%	1%
Redfield & Wilton Strategies	October 28–31, 2024	652 (LV)	–	47%	48%	–	1%	1%	3%
YouGov	October 25–31, 2024	880 (RV)	± 4.4%	47%	48%	0%	1%	–	4%
YouGov	October 25–31, 2024	856 (LV)	± 4.4%	48%	48%	0%	0%	–	4%
Noble Predictive Insights	October 28–30, 2024	775 (LV)	± 3.5%	47%	48%	–	2%	0%	3%
Data for Progress (D)	October 25–30, 2024	1,079 (LV)	± 3.0%	47%	48%	–	1%	0%	4%
AtlasIntel	October 25–29, 2024	1,458 (LV)	± 3.0%	46%	51%	–	1%	0%	2%
Mitchell Research & Communications	October 28, 2024	610 (LV)	± 4.0%	48%	50%	–	0%	1%	1%
Data Orbital	October 26–28, 2024	550 (LV)	± 4.3%	42%	50%	–	1%	1%	6%
Redfield & Wilton Strategies	October 25–27, 2024	901 (LV)	–	47%	49%	–	1%	1%	2%
J.L. Partners	October 24–26, 2024	500 (LV)	± 4.4%	48%	49%	–	0%	1%	2%
CNN/SSRS	October 21–26, 2024	781 (LV)	± 4.4%	48%	47%	–	1%	2%	2%
Redfield & Wilton Strategies	October 20–22, 2024	710 (LV)	–	46%	48%	–	1%	1%	4%
Bloomberg/Morning Consult	October 16–20, 2024	915 (RV)	± 3.0%	48%	48%	–	1%	2%	1%
Bloomberg/Morning Consult	October 16–20, 2024	861 (LV)	± 3.0%	48%	48%	–	1%	2%	1%
Redfield & Wilton Strategies	October 16–18, 2024	691 (LV)	–	46%	49%	–	1%	1%	3%
AtlasIntel	October 12–17, 2024	1,440 (LV)	± 3.0%	49%	49%	–	1%	0%	1%
Redfield & Wilton Strategies	October 12–14, 2024	1,141 (LV)	–	46%	48%	–	1%	1%	4%
The New York Times/Siena College	October 7–10, 2024	808 (RV)	± 4.0%	44%	49%	–	2%	1%	4%
The New York Times/Siena College	October 7–10, 2024	808 (LV)	± 4.0%	45%	50%	–	1%	0%	4%
Redfield & Wilton Strategies	September 27 – October 2, 2024	555 (LV)	–	47%	48%	–	1%	1%	3%
Fabrizio Ward (R)/Impact Research (D) (Note: Poll commissioned by AARP)	September 24 – October 1, 2024	600 (LV)	± 4.0%	47%	49%	–	1%	0%	3%
AtlasIntel	September 20–25, 2024	946 (LV)	± 3.0%	49%	50%	–	0%	–	1%
Cook Political Report/BSG (R)/GS Strategy Group (D)	September 19–25, 2024	409 (LV)	–	50%	47%	–	1%	–	2%
Bloomberg/Morning Consult	September 19–25, 2024	977 (RV)	± 3.0%	49%	46%	–	1%	2%	2%
Bloomberg/Morning Consult	September 19–25, 2024	926 (LV)	± 3.0%	49%	46%	–	1%	2%	2%
Fox News	September 20−24, 2024	1,021 (RV)	± 3.0%	47%	49%	1%	1%	2%	−
Fox News	September 20−24, 2024	764 (LV)	± 3.5%	47%	50%	0%	1%	2%	−
Suffolk University/USA Today	September 19−24, 2024	500 (LV)	± 4.4%	42%	48%	–	1%	1%	8%
The New York Times/Siena College	September 17–21, 2024	713 (RV)	± 4.4%	42%	47%	–	2%	3%	6%
The New York Times/Siena College	September 17–21, 2024	713 (LV)	± 4.4%	43%	48%	–	2%	2%	5%
Redfield & Wilton Strategies	September 16–19, 2024	789 (LV)	–	47%	47%	–	1%	1%	4%
Redfield & Wilton Strategies	September 6–9, 2024	765 (LV)	–	46%	47%	–	1%	1%	5%
TIPP Insights	September 3–5, 2024	1,015 (RV)	± 3.2%	46%	46%	1%	1%	–	6%
TIPP Insights	September 3–5, 2024	949 (LV)	± 3.2%	48%	48%	1%	1%	–	2%
YouGov	August 23 – September 3, 2024	900 (RV)	± 4.2%	45%	47%	1%	1%	–	6%
CNN/SSRS	August 23–29, 2024	682 (LV)	± 4.7%	44%	49%	–	2%	1%	4%
Redfield & Wilton Strategies	August 25–28, 2024	530 (LV)	–	45%	46%	–	1%	1%	7%
Bloomberg/Morning Consult	August 23–26, 2024	776 (LV)	± 4.0%	49%	47%	–	0%	2%	2%
Bloomberg/Morning Consult	August 23–26, 2024	758 (RV)	± 3.0%	49%	47%	–	0%	2%	2%
Fox News	August 23–26, 2024	1,014 (RV)	± 3.0%	48%	47%	1%	1%	2%	1%

== Arkansas ==
Donald J. Trump vs. Kamala Harris vs. Robert F. Kennedy Jr. vs. Cornel West vs. Jill Stein vs. Chase Oliver

Poll source	Date(s) administered	Sample size	Margin of error	Donald J. Trump Republican	Kamala Harris Democratic	Robert F. Kennedy Jr. Independent	Cornel West Independent	Jill Stein Green	Chase Oliver Libertarian	Other / Undecided
Hendrix College (Note: Poll sponsored by Talk Business & Politics)	September 5–6, 2024	696 (RV)	± 4.6 points	55%	40%	1%	–	0%	1%	1%

== California ==
Kamala Harris vs. Donald Trump

Poll source	Date(s) administered	Sample size	Margin of error	Kamala Harris Democratic	Donald Trump Republican	Other / Undecided
Research Co.	November 2–3, 2024	450 (LV)	± 4.6%	64%	32%	4%
Competitive Edge Research	October 28–30, 2024	517 (RV)	± 4.3%	53%	38%	8% (Note: "Someone else" with 4%)
UC Berkeley IGS	October 22–28, 2024	4,341 (LV)	± 2.0%	57%	35%	8%
ActiVote	October 7–27, 2024	400 (LV)	± 4.9%	63%	37%	–
Rose Institute/YouGov	October 7–17, 2024	1,139 (RV)	± 3.4%	60%	33%	7% (Note: "Other" with 7%)
Rose Institute/YouGov	October 7–17, 2024	1,139 (RV)	± 3.4%	63%	34%	3%
Rose Institute/YouGov	October 7–17, 2024	1,139 (LV)	± 3.4%	63%	34%	3%
Emerson College (Note: Poll sponsored by Inside CA Politics and The Hill)	October 12–14, 2024	1,000 (LV)	± 3.0%	59%	35%	6%
Emerson College	October 12–14, 2024	1,000 (LV)	± 3.0%	61%	37%	2%
ActiVote	September 22 – October 10, 2024	400 (LV)	± 4.9%	63.5%	36.5%	–
ActiVote	August 22 – September 21, 2024	400 (LV)	± 4.9%	64%	36%	–
Emerson College	September 3–5, 2024	815 (LV)	± 3.4%	60%	36%	4%
Emerson College	September 3–5, 2024	815 (LV)	± 3.4%	61%	38%	1% (Note: "Someone else" with 1%)
ActiVote	August 2–19, 2024	400 (LV)	± 4.9%	65%	35%	–
UC Berkeley IGS	July 31 – August 11, 2024	3,765 (LV)	± 2.0%	59%	34%	7%
	July 21, 2024	Kamala Harris declares her candidacy.				
Emerson College/Inside California Elections (Note: Poll sponsored by Nexstar Media Group)	November 11–14, 2023	1,000 (RV)	± 3.0%	47%	38%	15%

== Colorado ==
Kamala Harris vs. Donald Trump

Poll source	Date(s) administered	Sample size	Margin of error	Kamala Harris Democratic	Donald Trump Republican	Other / Undecided
Keating Research	October 28−30, 2024	600 (LV)	± 4.0%	53%	41%	7% (Note: "Someone else" with 2%)
YouGov	October 18−30, 2024	754 (LV)	± 4.54%	55%	41%	4%
ActiVote	October 1−30, 2024	400 (LV)	± 4.9%	57%	43%	–
ActiVote	September 15 − October 19, 2024	400 (LV)	± 4.9%	59%	41%	–
Morning Consult	September 9−18, 2024	512 (LV)	± 4.0%	53%	42%	5%
Keating Research	September 11–14, 2024	500 (LV)	± 4.4%	53%	42%	5%
Morning Consult	August 30 – September 8, 2024	498 (LV)	± 4.0%	55%	40%	5%

== Connecticut ==
Kamala Harris vs. Donald Trump vs. Robert F. Kennedy Jr.

Poll source	Date(s) administered	Sample size	Margin of error	Kamala Harris Democratic	Donald Trump Republican	Robert Kennedy Jr. Independent	Other / Undecided
MassINC Polling Group (Note: Poll sponsored by The Connecticut Mirror)	September 12–18, 2024	800 (LV)	± 3.7%	52%	37%	3%	8%

== Delaware ==
Kamala Harris vs. Donald Trump

Poll source	Date(s) administered	Sample size	Margin of error	Kamala Harris Democratic	Donald Trump Republican	Other / Undecided
Slingshot Strategies (D) (Note: Poll sponsored by Citizens for Judicial Fairness)	September 19–21, 2024	500 (RV)	± 4.4%	54%	37%	9%

Kamala Harris vs. Donald Trump vs. Robert F. Kennedy Jr. vs. Cornel West vs. Jill Stein vs. Chase Oliver

Poll source	Date(s) administered	Sample size	Margin of error	Kamala Harris Democratic	Donald Trump Republican	Robert F. Kennedy Jr. Independent	Cornel West Independent	Jill Stein Green	Chase Oliver Libertarian	Other / Undecided
University of Delaware	September 11–19, 2024	383 (LV)	± 5.8%	56%	36%	3%	–	–	1%	4%

== Florida ==
Donald Trump vs. Kamala Harris

Aggregate polls

Source of poll aggregation	Dates administered	Dates updated	Kamala Harris Democratic	Donald Trump Republican	Undecided (Note: Calculated by taking the difference of 100% and all other candidates combined.)	Margin
270ToWin	October 23 – November 4, 2024	November 4, 2024	44.6%	51.1%	4.3%	Trump +6.5%
538	through November 4, 2024	November 4, 2024	44.6%	51.2%	4.2%	Trump +6.6%
Silver Bulletin	through November 3, 2024	November 3, 2024	44.8%	51.3%	3.9%	Trump +6.5%
The Hill/DDHQ	through November 3, 2024	November 3, 2024	44.9%	51.6%	3.2%	Trump +6.7%
Average			44.7%	51.3%	4.0%	Trump +6.6%

Poll source	Date(s) administered	Sample size	Margin of error	Donald Trump Republican	Kamala Harris Democratic	Other / Undecided
Research Co.	November 2–3, 2024	450 (LV)	± 4.6%	51%	44%	5%
Victory Insights	November 1–2, 2024	400 (LV)	–	51%	47%	2%
Stetson University	October 25 – November 1, 2024	452 (LV)	± 5.0%	53%	46%	1%
Morning Consult	October 23 − November 1, 2024	2,022 (LV)	± 2.0%	51%	46%	3%
Mainstreet Research/Florida Atlantic University	October 19–27, 2024	913 (RV)	± 3.2%	53%	44%	3% (Note: "Another candidate" with 1%)
Mainstreet Research/Florida Atlantic University	October 19–27, 2024	897 (LV)	± 3.2%	53%	44%	3%
ActiVote	October 11–27, 2024	400 (LV)	± 4.9%	56%	44%	–
St. Pete Polls (Note: Poll conducted for Florida Politics)	October 23–25, 2024	1,227 (LV)	± 2.8%	50%	45%	5%
CES/YouGov	October 1–25, 2024	5,952 (A)	–	51%	47%	2%
CES/YouGov	October 1–25, 2024	5,916 (LV)	–	52%	46%	2%
Hunt Research (Note: Poll conducted for Florida State University)	October 16–22, 2024	1,234 (LV)	± 2.8%	50%	45%	5%
Emerson College	October 18–20, 2024	860 (LV)	± 3.3%	52%	44%	4%
Emerson College	October 18–20, 2024	860 (LV)	± 3.3%	54%	46%	–
Cherry Communications (R) (Note: Poll sponsored by Florida Chamber of Commerce)	October 10–20, 2024	614 (LV)	± 4.0%	51%	45%	4%
ActiVote	October 7–20, 2024	400 (LV)	± 4.9%	55%	45%	–
University of North Florida	October 7–18, 2024	977 (LV)	± 3.5%	53%	43%	4% (Note: "Someone else" with 2%)
RMG Research	October 14–17, 2024	788 (LV)	± 3.5%	52%	45%	3% (Note: "Some other candidate" with 1%)
RMG Research	October 14–17, 2024	788 (LV)	± 3.5%	52%	47%	1%
Rose Institute/YouGov	October 7–17, 2024	1,094 (RV)	± 3.5%	50%	45%	7% (Note: "Other" with 5%)
Rose Institute/YouGov	October 7–17, 2024	1,094 (RV)	± 3.5%	51%	46%	3%
Rose Institute/YouGov	October 7–17, 2024	1,076 (LV)	± 3.5%	51%	46%	3%
The Terrance Group (R) (Note: Poll sponsored by the Republican Party of Florida)	October 5–8, 2024	818 (RV)	± 3.5%	51%	44%	5%
Marist College	October 3–7, 2024	1,410 (RV)	± 3.3%	51%	47%	2%
Marist College	October 3–7, 2024	1,257 (LV)	± 3.6%	51%	47%	2%
New York Times/Siena College	September 29 – October 6, 2024	622 (LV)	± 5.0%	55%	41%	4%
ActiVote	September 17 – October 6, 2024	400 (LV)	± 4.9%	53%	47%	–
Mason-Dixon (Note: Poll conducted for WTVJ & WSCV)	October 1–4, 2024	625 (RV)	± 4.0%	49%	43%	8% (Note: "One of the other party tickets" with 2%)
RMG Research	September 25–27, 2024	774 (LV)	± 3.5%	50%	47%	3%
RMG Research	September 25–27, 2024	774 (LV)	± 3.5%	50%	48%	2%
Public Policy Polling (D) (Note: Poll commissioned by Clean and Prosperous America PAC)	September 25–26, 2024	800 (RV)	± 3.5%	50%	46%	4%
McLaughlin & Associates (R) (Note: Poll sponsored by Associated Industries of Florida)	September 23–25, 2024	1,200 (LV)	± 2.8%	51%	46%	3%
Victory Insights	September 22–25, 2024	600 (LV)	± 4.4%	47%	45%	8%
The Bullfinch Group (Note: Poll conducted for The Independent Center)	September 20–23, 2024	600 (RV)	± 4.0%	48%	47%	5%
Morning Consult	September 9−18, 2024	2,948 (LV)	± 2.0%	50%	47%	3%
Morning Consult	August 30 – September 8, 2024	3,182 (LV)	± 2.0%	49%	47%	4%
Emerson College	September 3–5, 2024	815 (LV)	± 3.4%	50%	45%	5%
Emerson College	September 3–5, 2024	815 (LV)	± 3.4%	51%	48%	1%
ActiVote	August 16–31, 2024	400 (LV)	± 4.9%	53%	47%	–
Cherry Communications (R)	August 15–26, 2024	600 (LV)	± 4.0%	52%	45%	3%
Public Policy Polling (D)	August 21–22, 2024	837 (RV)	± 3.4%	51%	47%	2%
ActiVote	August 5–15, 2024	400 (LV)	± 4.9%	54%	46%	–
Mainstreet Research/Florida Atlantic University	August 10–11, 2024	1,055 (RV)	± 3.0%	49%	46%	5% (Note: "Another candidate" with 2%)
Mainstreet Research/Florida Atlantic University	August 10–11, 2024	1,040 (LV)	± 3.0%	50%	47%	3%
University of North Florida	July 24–27, 2024	774 (LV)	± 4.6%	49%	42%	9% (Note: "Another candidate" with 4%)
	July 21, 2024	Kamala Harris declares her candidacy.				
InsiderAdvantage (R) (Note: Poll conducted for WTVT)	July 15–16, 2024	800 (LV)	± 4.0%	49%	39%	12% (Note: "Another candidate" with 7%)
Suffolk University/USA Today	September 15–18, 2022	500 (LV)	–	46%	44%	10%
Victory Insights	September 16–18, 2021	450 (LV)	± 4.6%	49%	51%	–

Donald Trump vs. Kamala Harris vs. Cornel West vs. Jill Stein vs. Chase Oliver

Poll source	Date(s) administered	Sample size	Margin of error	Donald Trump Republican	Kamala Harris Democratic	Cornel West Independent	Jill Stein Green	Chase Oliver Libertarian	Other / Undecided
Focaldata	October 3 – November 1, 2024	1,250 (LV)	–	52%	45%	–	0%	0%	3%
Focaldata	October 3 – November 1, 2024	1,099 (RV)	± 2.8%	50%	46%	–	1%	0%	3%
Focaldata	October 3 – November 1, 2024	1,250 (A)	–	49%	47%	–	1%	0%	3%
Cygnal (R)	October 26–28, 2024	600 (LV)	± 4.0%	48%	43%	–	1%	1%	7% (Note: Claudia De la Cruz (PSL) & Peter Sonski (ASP) with 1% each; Randall Terry (C) with 0%)
Hunt Research	October 16–22, 2024	1,234 (LV)	± 2.8%	50%	44%	–	0%	0%	6%
Redfield & Wilton Strategies	October 16–18, 2024	1,275 (LV)	–	49%	45%	–	0%	1%	6%
Redfield & Wilton Strategies	October 12–14, 2024	1,009 (LV)	–	50%	44%	–	1%	0%	5%
New York Times/Siena College	September 29 – October 6, 2024	622 (LV)	± 5.0%	53%	40%	–	0%	1%	6%
Redfield & Wilton Strategies	September 27 – October 2, 2024	2,946 (LV)	–	49%	45%	–	1%	1%	4%
Public Policy Polling (D)	September 25–26, 2024	800 (RV)	± 3.5%	49%	45%	0%	1%	–	5%
Redfield & Wilton Strategies	September 16–19, 2024	1,602 (LV)	–	50%	45%	–	0%	1%	4%
Redfield & Wilton Strategies	September 6–9, 2024	1,465 (LV)	–	50%	44%	–	0%	0%	6%
Redfield & Wilton Strategies	August 25–28, 2024	980 (LV)	± 3.1%	48%	43%	–	0%	1%	8% (Note: "Other (another third party/write-in)" with 1%)

== Georgia ==
Kamala Harris vs. Donald Trump

Aggregate polls

Source of poll aggregation	Dates administered	Dates updated	Kamala Harris Democratic	Donald Trump Republican	Other / Undecided	Margin
270ToWin	October 22 – November 4, 2024	November 5, 2024	47.5%	48.7%	3.8%	Trump +1.2%
538	through November 4, 2024	November 5, 2024	47.5%	48.2%	4.3%	Trump +0.7%
Silver Bulletin	through November 4, 2024	November 5, 2024	47.9%	48.9%	3.2%	Trump +1.0%
The Hill/DDHQ	through November 4, 2024	November 5, 2024	47.9%	49.6%	2.5%	Trump +1.7%
Average			47.7%	48.9%	3.4%	Trump +1.2%

Poll source	Date(s) administered	Sample size	Margin of error	Kamala Harris Democratic	Donald Trump Republican	Other / Undecided
HarrisX	November 3–5, 2024	1,880 (RV)	± 2.3%	45%	48%	7%
HarrisX	November 3–5, 2024	1,880 (RV)	± 2.3%	49%	51%	–
HarrisX	November 3–5, 2024	1,659 (LV)	± 2.3%	47%	49%	4%
HarrisX	November 3–5, 2024	1,659 (LV)	± 2.3%	48%	52%	–
AtlasIntel	November 3–4, 2024	1,112 (LV)	± 3.0%	48%	50%	2%
InsiderAdvantage (R)	November 2–3, 2024	800 (LV)	± 3.7%	48%	49%	3%
Patriot Polling	November 1–3, 2024	818 (RV)	± 3.0%	49%	50%	1%
AtlasIntel	November 1–2, 2024	1,174 (LV)	± 3.0%	48%	50%	2%
Emerson College	October 30 – November 2, 2024	800 (LV)	± 3.4%	49%	50%	1%
Emerson College	October 30 – November 2, 2024	800 (LV)	± 3.4%	49%	50%	1%
The New York Times/Siena College	October 24 – November 2, 2024	1,004 (RV)	± 3.5%	46%	46%	8%
The New York Times/Siena College	October 24 – November 2, 2024	1,004 (LV)	± 3.5%	48%	47%	5%
ActiVote	October 15 – November 2, 2024	400 (LV)	± 4.9%	49%	51%	–
AtlasIntel	October 30–31, 2024	1,212 (LV)	± 3.0%	48%	50%	2%
YouGov	October 25–31, 2024	984 (RV)	± 3.9%	48%	50%	2%
YouGov	October 25–31, 2024	939 (LV)	± 3.9%	48%	50%	2%
Morning Consult	October 21–30, 2024	1,009 (LV)	± 3.0%	48%	50%	2%
AtlasIntel	October 25–29, 2024	1,429 (LV)	± 3.0%	48%	51%	1%
Rasmussen Reports (R)	October 25–28, 2024	910 (LV)	± 3.0%	46%	51%	3%
SoCal Strategies (R)	October 26–27, 2024	658 (LV)	± 3.8%	49%	50%	1%
Trafalgar Group (R)	October 24–26, 2024	1,087 (LV)	± 2.9%	46%	48%	6%
CES/YouGov	October 1–25, 2024	2,682 (A)	–	48%	49%	3%
CES/YouGov	October 1–25, 2024	2,663 (LV)	–	46%	51%	3%
National Public Affairs	October 21–24, 2024	829 (LV)	± 3.4%	47%	49%	4%
Marist College	October 17–22, 2024	1,356 (RV)	± 3.5%	49%	48%	3%
Marist College	October 17–22, 2024	1,193 (LV)	± 3.9%	49%	49%	2%
Bloomberg/Morning Consult	October 16–20, 2024	914 (RV)	± 3.0%	48%	49%	3%
Bloomberg/Morning Consult	October 16–20, 2024	855 (LV)	± 3.0%	48%	50%	2%
AtlasIntel	October 12–17, 2024	1,411 (LV)	± 3.0%	48%	50%	2%
ActiVote	October 1–17, 2024	400 (LV)	± 4.9%	49%	51%	–
TIPP Insights	October 14–16, 2024	1,029 (RV)	± 3.5%	49%	46%	5%
TIPP Insights	October 14–16, 2024	813 (LV)	± 3.5%	48%	49%	3%
InsiderAdvantage (R)	October 14–15, 2024	800 (LV)	± 3.7%	47%	49%	4%
Morning Consult	October 6–15, 2024	1,002 (LV)	± 3.0%	48%	49%	3%
The Washington Post/Schar School	September 30 – October 15, 2024	730 (RV)	± 4.5%	50%	44%	6%
The Washington Post/Schar School	September 30 – October 15, 2024	730 (LV)	± 4.5%	51%	46%	3%
Quinnipiac University	October 10–14, 2024	1,328 (LV)	± 2.7%	46%	52%	2%
RMG Research	October 7–10, 2024	731 (LV)	± 3.6%	47%	49%	4% (Note: "Some other candidate" with 2%)
RMG Research	October 7–10, 2024	731 (LV)	± 3.6%	47%	50%	3%
Fabrizio, Lee & Associates (R)/McLaughlin & Associates (R)	October 6–9, 2024	800 (LV)	± 3.5%	45%	50%	5%
Trafalgar Group (R)	October 7–8, 2024	1,089 (LV)	± 2.9%	45%	46%	9% (Note: "Other" with 4%)
Emerson College	October 5–8, 2024	1,000 (LV)	± 3.0%	48%	49%	3%
Emerson College	October 5–8, 2024	1,000 (LV)	± 3.0%	50%	50%	–
The Wall Street Journal	September 28 – October 8, 2024	600 (RV)	± 5.0%	48%	46%	6%
OnMessage Inc. (R)	September 24 – October 2, 2024	500 (LV)	± 4.4%	44%	47%	9%
InsiderAdvantage (R)	September 29–30, 2024	800 (LV)	± 3.7%	48%	48%	4%
Quinnipiac University	September 25–29, 2024	942 (LV)	± 3.2%	45%	50%	5%
Global Strategy Group (D)/North Star Opinion Research (R)	September 23–29, 2024	400 (LV)	± 4.9%	47%	47%	6%
AtlasIntel	September 20–25, 2024	1,200 (LV)	± 3.0%	49%	50%	1%
Cook Political Report/BSG (R)/GS Strategy Group (D)	September 19–25, 2024	411 (LV)	–	47%	49%	4%
Bloomberg/Morning Consult	September 19–25, 2024	989 (RV)	± 3.0%	48%	47%	5%
Bloomberg/Morning Consult	September 19–25, 2024	913 (LV)	± 3.0%	49%	49%	2%
Fox News	September 20−24, 2024	1,006 (RV)	± 3.0%	51%	48%	1%
Fox News	September 20−24, 2024	707 (LV)	± 3.5%	51%	48%	1%
CBS News/YouGov	September 20–24, 2024	1,441 (RV)	± 3.5%	49%	51%	–
Marist College	September 19−24, 2024	1,420 (RV)	± 3.6%	49%	48%	3%
Marist College	September 19−24, 2024	1,220 (LV)	± 3.9%	49%	50%	1%
The Bullfinch Group	September 20–23, 2024	600 (RV)	± 4.0%	49%	47%	4%
Rasmussen Reports (R)	September 19–22, 2024	1,152 (LV)	± 3.0%	47%	50%	3%
Rasmussen Reports (R)	September 19–22, 2024	1,152 (LV)	± 3.0%	47%	51%	2%
The New York Times/Siena College	September 17–21, 2024	682 (RV)	± 4.6%	44%	48%	8%
The New York Times/Siena College	September 17–21, 2024	682 (LV)	± 4.6%	45%	49%	6%
TIPP Insights	September 16–18, 2024	1,046 (RV)	± 3.5%	48%	45%	7%
TIPP Insights	September 16–18, 2024	835 (LV)	± 3.5%	48%	48%	9%
Emerson College	September 15–18, 2024	975 (LV)	± 3.1%	47%	50%	3%
Emerson College	September 15–18, 2024	975 (LV)	± 3.1%	48%	50%	2%
Morning Consult	September 9−18, 2024	1,347 (LV)	± 3.0%	48%	49%	3%
Trafalgar Group (R)	September 11–13, 2024	1,098 (LV)	± 2.9%	45%	46%	9%
ActiVote	August 8 – September 10, 2024	400 (LV)	± 4.9%	50%	50%	–
Quinnipiac University	September 4–8, 2024	969 (LV)	± 3.2%	46%	49%	5%
Morning Consult	August 30 – September 8, 2024	1,405 (LV)	± 3.0%	48%	48%	4%
Mainstreet Research/Florida Atlantic University	September 5–6, 2024	647 (RV)	± 3.9%	44%	47%	9% (Note: "Another candidate" with 4%)
Mainstreet Research/Florida Atlantic University	September 5–6, 2024	567 (LV)	± 3.9%	45%	47%	8% (Note: "Another candidate" with 2%)
Patriot Polling	September 1–3, 2024	814 (RV)	–	48%	49%	3%
InsiderAdvantage (R)	August 29–31, 2024	800 (LV)	± 3.7%	48%	48%	4%
Emerson College	August 25–28, 2024	800 (LV)	± 3.4%	49%	48%	3%
Emerson College	August 25–28, 2024	800 (LV)	± 3.4%	50%	49%	1%
Bloomberg/Morning Consult	August 23–26, 2024	737 (LV)	± 4.0%	50%	47%	3%
Bloomberg/Morning Consult	August 23–26, 2024	801 (RV)	± 3.0%	49%	47%	4%
Fox News	August 23–26, 2024	1,014 (RV)	± 3.0%	50%	48%	2%
Institute for Global Affairs/YouGov	August 15–22, 2024	350 (A)	± 6.6%	43%	42%	15% (Note: "I am eligible to vote but would not" with 6%; "I am not eligible to vote" with 5%; "Other" with 4%)
Spry Strategies (R)	August 14–20, 2024	600 (LV)	± 4.0%	49%	49%	2%
Focaldata	August 6–16, 2024	651 (LV)	± 3.8%	48%	52%	–
The New York Times/Siena College	August 9–14, 2024	661 (RV)	± 4.4%	44%	51%	5%
The New York Times/Siena College	August 9–14, 2024	661 (LV)	± 4.4%	46%	50%	4%
Cook Political Report/BSG (R)/GS Strategy Group (D)	July 26 – August 8, 2024	405 (LV)	–	48%	48%	4%
Fabrizio Ward (R)/Impact Research (D) (Note: Poll commissioned by AARP)	July 24–31, 2024	600 (LV)	± 4.0%	48%	48%	4%
Trafalgar Group (R)/InsiderAdvantage (R)	July 29–30, 2024	– (LV)	± 3.5%	47%	49%	4%
Public Policy Polling (D)	July 29–30, 2024	662 (RV)	± 3.8%	48%	47%	5%
Bloomberg/Morning Consult	July 24–28, 2024	799 (RV)	± 3.0%	47%	47%	5%
SoCal Strategies (R) (Note: Poll sponsored by On Point Politics)	July 25–26, 2024	505 (RV)	± 4.4%	46%	50%	4%
Emerson College	July 22–23, 2024	800 (RV)	± 3.4%	46%	48%	6%
Emerson College	July 22–23, 2024	800 (RV)	± 3.4%	49%	51%	–
Landmark Communications	July 22, 2024	400 (LV)	± 5.0%	47%	48%	5%
	July 21, 2024	Kamala Harris declares her candidacy.				
University of Georgia School of Public and International Affairs (Note: Poll sponsored by The Atlanta Journal-Constitution)	July 9–18, 2024	1,000 (LV)	± 3.1%	46%	51%	3%
InsiderAdvantage (R) (Note: Poll conducted for WAGA-TV)	July 15–16, 2024	800 (LV)	± 4.1%	37%	47%	16%
Mainstreet Research/Florida Atlantic University	July 12–15, 2024	640 (RV)	± 3.6%	42%	46%	12%
Mainstreet Research/Florida Atlantic University	July 12–15, 2024	549 (LV)	± 3.6%	43%	49%	8%
Bloomberg/Morning Consult	May 7–13, 2024	795 (RV)	± 3.0%	41%	49%	10%
Emerson College	February 14–16, 2024	1,000 (RV)	± 3.0%	41%	51%	8%
The New York Times/Siena College	October 22 – November 3, 2023	629 (RV)	± 4.5%	44%	45%	11%
The New York Times/Siena College	October 22 – November 3, 2023	629 (LV)	± 4.5%	44%	47%	9%

Kamala Harris vs. Donald Trump vs. Cornel West vs. Jill Stein vs. Chase Oliver

Aggregate polls

Source of poll aggregation	Dates administered	Dates updated	Kamala Harris Democratic	Donald Trump Republican	Jill Stein Green	Cornel West Independent	Chase Oliver Libertarian	Other/ Undecided	Margin
Race to the WH	through October 22, 2024	October 22, 2024	47.4%	48.7%	0.8%	—N/a	0.9%	2.2%	Trump +1.3%
270ToWin	October 16–22, 2024	October 22, 2024	45.8%	49.2%	0.6%	0.0%	0.6%	3.8%	Trump +3.4%
Average			46.6%	49.0%	0.7%	0.0%	0.8%	2.9%	Trump +2.4%

Poll source	Date(s) administered	Sample size	Margin of error	Kamala Harris Democratic	Donald Trump Republican	Cornel West Independent	Jill Stein Green	Chase Oliver Libertarian	Other / Undecided
HarrisX	November 3–5, 2024	1,880 (RV)	± 2.3%	45%	47%	1%	1%	–	6%
HarrisX	November 3–5, 2024	1,880 (RV)	± 2.3%	48%	49%	2%	1%	–	–
HarrisX	November 3–5, 2024	1,659 (LV)	± 2.3%	47%	48%	1%	1%	–	3%
HarrisX	November 3–5, 2024	1,659 (LV)	± 2.3%	48%	50%	1%	1%	–	–
AtlasIntel	November 3–4, 2024	1,112 (LV)	± 3.0%	48%	48%	–	1%	1%	2%
AtlasIntel	November 1–2, 2024	1,174 (LV)	± 3.0%	47%	49%	–	2%	1%	1%
The New York Times/Siena College	October 24 – November 2, 2024	1,004 (RV)	± 3.5%	44%	43%	2%	0%	3%	8%
The New York Times/Siena College	October 24 – November 2, 2024	1,004 (LV)	± 3.5%	46%	46%	0%	0%	2%	6%
Focaldata	October 3 – November 1, 2024	1,850 (LV)	–	48%	49%	–	1%	1%	1%
Focaldata	October 3 – November 1, 2024	1,627 (RV)	± 2.3%	50%	47%	–	1%	1%	1%
Focaldata	October 3 – November 1, 2024	1,850 (A)	–	49%	47%	–	1%	2%	1%
AtlasIntel	October 30–31, 2024	1,212 (LV)	± 3.0%	47%	49%	–	2%	1%	1%
East Carolina University	October 28–31, 2024	902 (LV)	± 3.0%	49%	50%	–	0%	1%	–
Redfield & Wilton Strategies	October 28–31, 2024	1,779 (LV)	–	47%	48%	–	0%	1%	4%
Data for Progress (D)	October 25–31, 2024	792 (LV)	± 3.0%	49%	48%	0%	0%	1%	2%
YouGov	October 25–31, 2024	984 (RV)	± 3.9%	46%	48%	1%	1%	–	4%
YouGov	October 25–31, 2024	939 (LV)	± 3.9%	47%	48%	0%	0%	–	5%
AtlasIntel	October 25–29, 2024	1,429 (LV)	± 3.0%	47%	50%	–	1%	1%	1%
CNN/SSRS	October 23–28, 2024	732 (LV)	± 4.7%	47%	48%	–	1%	1%	3%
Redfield & Wilton Strategies	October 25–27, 2024	1,112 (LV)	–	47%	48%	–	0%	1%	4%
The Citadel	October 17–25, 2024	1,218 (RV)	± 3.8%	47%	48%	1%	1%	0%	3%
The Citadel	October 17–25, 2024	1,126 (LV)	± 3.8%	47%	49%	0%	1%	0%	3%
Redfield & Wilton Strategies	October 20–22, 2024	1,168 (LV)	–	47%	48%	–	0%	1%	4%
Bloomberg/Morning Consult	October 16–20, 2024	914 (RV)	± 3.0%	48%	47%	–	0%	2%	3%
Bloomberg/Morning Consult	October 16–20, 2024	855 (LV)	± 3.0%	48%	49%	–	0%	1%	2%
University of Georgia School of Public and International Affairs	October 7–16, 2024	1,000 (LV)	± 3.1%	43%	47%	–	0%	0%	10% (Note: "Other candidate" with 1%)
Redfield & Wilton Strategies	October 16–18, 2024	1,019 (LV)	–	47%	48%	–	1%	1%	3%
AtlasIntel	October 12–17, 2024	1,411 (LV)	± 3.0%	48%	50%	0%	0%	1%	1%
Redfield & Wilton Strategies	October 12–14, 2024	637 (LV)	–	47%	47%	–	2%	1%	3%
Quinnipiac University	October 10–14, 2024	1,328 (LV)	± 2.7%	45%	52%	–	1%	1%	1%
East Carolina University	October 9–14, 2024	701 (LV)	± 4.0%	46%	49%	–	1%	0%	4%
Redfield & Wilton Strategies	October 8–9, 2024	608 (LV)	–	47%	48%	–	1%	1%	3%
Redfield & Wilton Strategies	September 27 – October 2, 2024	3,783 (LV)	–	47%	47%	–	1%	1%	4%
Quinnipiac University	September 25–29, 2024	942 (LV)	± 3.2%	44%	50%	1%	0%	1%	4% (Note: Claudia De la Cruz (PSL) with 1%)
AtlasIntel	September 20–25, 2024	1,200 (LV)	± 3.0%	49%	49%	0%	–	0%	2%
Cook Political Report/BSG (R)/GS Strategy Group (D)	September 19–25, 2024	411 (LV)	–	47%	48%	–	0%	–	5%
Bloomberg/Morning Consult	September 19–25, 2024	989 (RV)	± 3.0%	48%	47%	–	0%	3%	2%
Bloomberg/Morning Consult	September 19–25, 2024	913 (LV)	± 3.0%	48%	48%	–	0%	2%	2%
Fox News	September 20−24, 2024	1,006 (RV)	± 3.0%	49%	47%	1%	1%	1%	1%
Fox News	September 20−24, 2024	707 (LV)	± 3.5%	50%	48%	1%	1%	1%	−
The New York Times/Siena College	September 17–21, 2024	682 (RV)	± 4.6%	43%	46%	–	2%	2%	7%
The New York Times/Siena College	September 17–21, 2024	682 (LV)	± 4.6%	44%	47%	–	1%	2%	6%
Redfield & Wilton Strategies	September 16–19, 2024	1,043 (LV)	–	46%	48%	–	1%	1%	4%
TIPP Insights	September 16–18, 2024	1,046 (RV)	± 3.5%	46%	44%	2%	1%	–	7%
TIPP Insights	September 16–18, 2024	835 (LV)	± 3.5%	48%	48%	1%	1%	–	2%
University of Georgia School of Public and International Affairs	September 9–15, 2024	1,000 (LV)	± 3.1%	44%	47%	1%	0%	0%	7% (Note: Claudia De la Cruz (PSL) with 0%)
Redfield & Wilton Strategies	September 6–9, 2024	562 (LV)	–	47%	49%	–	1%	0%	3%
Quinnipiac University	September 4–8, 2024	969 (LV)	± 3.2%	45%	49%	1%	0%	0%	6%
YouGov	August 23 – September 3, 2024	1,000 (RV)	± 3.8%	45%	47%	0%	0%	–	8%
CNN/SSRS	August 23–29, 2024	617 (LV)	± 4.7%	48%	47%	1%	1%	1%	2%
Redfield & Wilton Strategies	August 25–28, 2024	699 (LV)	–	42%	44%	–	1%	0%	13%
Bloomberg/Morning Consult	August 23–26, 2024	737 (LV)	± 4.0%	48%	46%	–	1%	3%	2%
Bloomberg/Morning Consult	August 23–26, 2024	801 (RV)	± 3.0%	47%	46%	–	1%	4%	2%
Fox News	August 23–26, 2024	1,014 (RV)	± 3.0%	48%	46%	1%	2%	2%	1%

== Illinois ==
Kamala Harris vs. Donald Trump

Poll source	Date(s) administered	Sample size	Margin of error	Kamala Harris Democratic	Donald Trump Republican	Other / Undecided
ActiVote	October 4–28, 2024	400 (LV)	± 4.9%	58%	42%	–
ActiVote	September 3 – October 5, 2024	400 (LV)	± 4.9%	59%	41%	–
ActiVote	August 6–29, 2024	400 (LV)	± 4.9%	58%	42%	–

== Indiana ==
Donald Trump vs. Kamala Harris

Poll source	Date(s) administered	Sample size (Note: Key: A – all adults RV – registered voters LV – likely voters V – unclear)	Margin of error	Donald Trump Republican	Kamala Harris Democratic	Other / Undecided
ActiVote	October 3–28, 2024	400 (LV)	± 4.9%	58%	42%	–
ActiVote	August 28 – September 30, 2024	400 (LV)	± 4.9%	57%	43%	–
ARW Strategies (Note: Poll sponsored by Indy Politics)	September 23–25, 2024	600 (LV)	–	55%	39%	6%
Emerson College	September 12–13, 2024	1,000 (LV)	± 3.0%	57%	40%	3%
Emerson College	September 12–13, 2024	1,000 (LV)	± 3.0%	58%	41%	1%
Lake Research Partners (D) (Note: Poll sponsored by the campaign of Destiny Wells, 2024 Democratic nominee for attorney general)	August 26 – September 2, 2024	600 (LV)	± 4.0%	52%	42%	6%

== Iowa ==
Donald Trump vs. Kamala Harris

Aggregate polls

Source of poll aggregation	Dates administered	Dates updated	Kamala Harris Democratic	Donald Trump Republican	Other / Undecided	Margin
270ToWin	October 2 – November 4, 2024	November 4, 2024	45.3%	50.0%	4.7%	Trump +4.7%
Silver Bulletin	through November 3, 2024	November 4, 2024	45.4%	49.8%	4.8%	Trump +4.4%
Average			45.4%	49.9%	4.7%	Trump +4.5%

Poll source	Date(s) administered	Sample size	Margin of error	Donald Trump Republican	Kamala Harris Democratic	Other / Undecided
InsiderAdvantage (R)	November 2–3, 2024	800 (LV)	± 3.5%	52%	46%	2% (Note: "Other" with 1%)
SoCal Strategies (R) (Note: Poll sponsored by On Point Politics & Red Eagle Politics)	November 2–3, 2024	501 (RV)	± 4.4%	50%	43%	7%
SoCal Strategies (R)	November 2–3, 2024	435 (LV)	± 4.4%	52%	44%	4%
Emerson College (Note: Poll sponsored by RealClearDefense)	November 1–2, 2024	800 (LV)	± 3.4%	53%	43%	4%
Emerson College	November 1–2, 2024	800 (LV)	± 3.4%	54%	45%	1%
Cygnal (R) (Note: Poll sponsored by the Iowans for Tax Relief Foundation)	September 27–28, 2024	600 (LV)	± 4.0%	51%	45%	4%

Donald Trump vs. Kamala Harris vs. Robert F. Kennedy Jr. vs. Chase Oliver

Poll source	Date(s) administered	Sample size	Margin of error	Donald Trump Republican	Kamala Harris Democratic	Robert F. Kennedy Jr. Independent	Chase Oliver Libertarian	Other / Undecided
Selzer & Co. (Note: Poll sponsored by the Des Moines Register & Mediacom Iowa)	October 28–31, 2024	808 (LV)	± 3.4%	44%	47%	3%	0%	6% (Note: "Not sure" with 3%; "Don't want to say" with 2%; "Someone else" with 1%; "Would not vote" with 0%)
Selzer & Co.	September 8–11, 2024	656 (LV)	± 3.8%	47%	43%	6%	1%	3%

== Kansas ==
Donald Trump vs. Kamala Harris

Poll source	Date(s) administered	Sample size	Margin of error	Donald Trump Republican	Kamala Harris Democratic	Other / Undecided
Fort Hays State University	September 26 – October 16, 2024	656 (A)	–	46%	37%	17% (Note: "I do not plan on voting/cannot vote" & "Neither of the top two candidates" with 7% each)
Fort Hays State University	September 26 – October 16, 2024	608 (A)	–	50%	39%	11% (Note: "Neither of the top two candidates" with 7%)
Fort Hays State University	September 26 – October 16, 2024	517 (RV)	–	48%	43%	9% (Note: "Neither of the top two candidates" with 6%)

== Maine ==
==== Statewide ====
Kamala Harris vs. Donald Trump

Poll source	Date(s) administered	Sample size	Margin of error	Kamala Harris Democratic	Donald Trump Republican	Other / Undecided
University of New Hampshire	August 15–19, 2024	951 (LV)	± 3.2%	58%	41%	1%
University of New Hampshire	July 23–25, 2024	1,445 (LV)	± 2.6%	54%	45%	1%

Kamala Harris vs. Donald Trump vs. Cornel West vs. Jill Stein vs. Chase Oliver

Poll source	Date(s) administered	Sample size	Margin of error	Kamala Harris Democratic	Donald Trump Republican	Cornel West Independent	Jill Stein Green	Chase Oliver Libertarian	Other / Undecided
University of New Hampshire	October 29 – November 2, 2024	1,485 (LV)	± 2.4%	52%	41%	1%	1%	1%	4%
SurveyUSA (Note: Poll sponsored by Bangor Daily News & FairVote)	October 24–29, 2024	1,079 (LV)	± 3.6%	51%	43%	1%	1%	1%	3%
Pan Atlantic Research	September 5–15, 2024	812 (LV)	± 3.5%	50%	41%	1%	1%	1%	6%

==== Maine's 1st congressional district ====
Kamala Harris vs. Donald Trump

Poll source	Date(s) administered	Sample size	Margin of error	Kamala Harris Democratic	Donald Trump Republican	Other / Undecided
Pan Atlantic Research	September 5–15, 2024	414 (LV)	–	58%	32%	10%
University of New Hampshire	August 15–19, 2024	476 (LV)	–	64%	36%	–

Kamala Harris vs. Donald Trump vs. Cornel West vs. Jill Stein vs. Chase Oliver

Poll source	Date(s) administered	Sample size	Margin of error	Kamala Harris Democratic	Donald Trump Republican	Cornel West Independent	Jill Stein Green	Chase Oliver Libertarian	Other / Undecided
University of New Hampshire	October 29 – November 2, 2024	801 (LV)	± 3.5%	60%	36%	0%	1%	1%	2%
SurveyUSA	October 24–29, 2024	482 (LV)	–	58%	37%	1%	1%	0%	3%

==== Maine's 2nd congressional district ====
Donald Trump vs. Kamala Harris

Poll source	Date(s) administered	Sample size	Margin of error	Donald Trump Republican	Kamala Harris Democratic	Other / Undecided
Axis Research (Note: Poll sponsored by the NRCC)	October 17–20, 2024	411 (LV)	± 4.8%	50%	41%	8% (Note: "Third-party candidate" with 3%)
Pan Atlantic Research	September 5–15, 2024	398 (LV)	–	49%	42%	9%
University of New Hampshire	August 15–19, 2024	432 (LV)	–	47%	52%	1%

Donald Trump vs. Kamala Harris vs. Cornel West vs. Jill Stein vs. Chase Oliver

Poll source	Date(s) administered	Sample size	Margin of error	Donald Trump Republican	Kamala Harris Democratic	Cornel West Independent	Jill Stein Green	Chase Oliver Libertarian	Other / Undecided
University of New Hampshire	October 29 – November 2, 2024	683 (LV)	± 3.7%	48%	44%	1%	1%	1%	5%
SurveyUSA	October 24–29, 2024	484 (LV)	–	49%	44%	1%	1%	1%	4%

== Maryland ==
Kamala Harris vs. Donald Trump

Poll source	Date(s) administered	Sample size	Margin of error	Kamala Harris Democratic	Donald Trump Republican	Other / Undecided
Morning Consult	October 22–31, 2024	490 (LV)	± 5.0%	64%	31%	5%
ActiVote	October 6–30, 2024	400 (LV)	± 4.9%	64%	37%	–
Braun Research (Note: Poll sponsored by The Washington Post and the University of Maryland, College Park)	October 17–22, 2024	1,000 (LV)	± 3.6%	61%	33%	7% (Note: "No opinion/Skipped" with 4%; "Would not vote" with 1%; "Someone else" with 2%)
Braun Research	October 17–22, 2024	1,000 (RV)	± 3.6%	59%	34%	7% (Note: "No opinion/Skipped" with 4%; "Would not vote" with 1%; "Someone else" with 2%)
Emerson College	October 19–21, 2024	865 (LV)	± 3.2%	64%	34%	2%
Emerson College	October 19–21, 2024	865 (LV)	± 3.2%	63%	33%	4% (Note: "Someone else" with 2%; "Undecided" with 2%)
Morning Consult	October 10–15, 2024	490 (LV)	± 4.0%	64%	31%	4%
ActiVote	September 8 – October 14, 2024	400 (LV)	± 4.9%	63%	37%	–
Braun Research	September 19–23, 2024	1,012 (LV)	± 3.5%	64%	32%	5% (Note: "No opinion/Skipped" with 4%; "Would not vote" with 1%; "Other" with <0.5%)
Braun Research	September 19–23, 2024	1,012 (RV)	± 3.5%	62%	32%	6% (Note: "No opinion/Skipped" with 5%; "Would not vote" with 1%; "Other" with <0.5%)
Morning Consult	September 9–18, 2024	516 (LV)	± 4.0%	61%	33%	6%
Public Policy Polling (D)	September 16–17, 2024	543 (RV)	± 4.2%	64%	33%	3%
Emerson College	September 12–13, 2024	890 (LV)	± 3.2%	65%	33%	2%
Emerson College	September 12–13, 2024	890 (LV)	± 3.2%	63%	32%	5%
Morning Consult	August 30 – September 8, 2024	516 (LV)	± 4.0%	62%	34%	4%
Gonzales Research	August 24–30, 2024	820 (RV)	± 3.5%	56%	35%	10%
Fabrizio Ward (R)/Impact Research (D)	August 14–20, 2024	700 (LV)	± 4.0%	64%	32%	4%

Kamala Harris vs. Donald Trump vs. Robert F. Kennedy Jr. vs. Jill Stein vs. Chase Oliver

Poll source	Date(s) administered	Sample size	Margin of error	Kamala Harris Democratic	Donald Trump Republican	Robert F. Kennedy Jr. Independent	Chase Oliver Libertarian	Jill Stein Green	Undecided
Chism Strategies	October 28–30, 2024	510 (LV)	± 4.34%	56%	33%	0%	0%	1%	10% (Note: "Someone else" with 4%)
YouGov (Note: Poll sponsored by the University of Maryland, College Park.)	October 23–27, 2024	500 (LV)	± 5.2%	61%	34%	–	0%	2%	5%
University of Maryland, Baltimore County	September 23–28, 2024	863 (LV)	± 3.3%	57%	35%	2%	0%	1%	5% (Note: "Some other candidate" with 2%)
Braun Research	September 19–23, 2024	1,012 (LV)	± 3.5%	63%	31%	–	1%	1%	5% (Note: "No opinion/Skipped" with 4%; "Would not vote" with 1%; "Other" with <0.5%)
Braun Research	September 19–23, 2024	1,012 (RV)	± 3.5%	61%	31%	–	1%	1%	6% (Note: "No opinion/Skipped" with 5%; "Would not vote" with 1%; "Other" with <0.5%)
Fabrizio Ward (R)/Impact Research (D)	August 14–20, 2024	700 (LV)	± 4.0%	59%	29%	5%	1%	1%	5%

== Massachusetts ==
Kamala Harris vs. Donald Trump

Poll source	Date(s) administered	Sample size	Margin of error	Kamala Harris Democratic	Donald Trump Republican	Other / Undecided
ActiVote	October 2–30, 2024	400 (LV)	± 4.9%	66%	34%	–
Emerson College (Note: Poll sponsored by WHDH)	October 24–26, 2024	1,000 (LV)	± 3.0%	59%	36%	5%
Emerson College	October 24–26, 2024	1,000 (LV)	± 3.0%	60%	37%	3%
ActiVote	September 6 – October 16, 2024	400 (LV)	± 4.9%	67%	33%	–
MassINC Polling Group (Note: Poll sponsored by CommonWealth Beacon and WBUR)	September 12–18, 2024	800 (LV)	± 4.1%	63%	35%	2% (Note: "Would not vote" with 1%)

Kamala Harris vs. Donald Trump vs. Cornel West vs. Jill Stein vs. Chase Oliver

Poll source	Date(s) administered	Sample size	Margin of error	Kamala Harris Democratic	Donald Trump Republican	Cornel West Independent	Jill Stein Green	Chase Oliver Libertarian	Other / Undecided
University of New Hampshire	October 29 – November 2, 2024	744 (LV)	± 3.6%	60%	34%	–	2%	1%	3% (Note: Claudia De la Cruz (PSL) & "Another Candidate" with 1% each)
YouGov (Note: Poll sponsored by the University of Massachusetts Amherst Department of Political Science & WCVB-TV)	October 3–10, 2024	700 (A)	± 4.8%	56%	30%	–	2%	1%	11% (Note: Claudia De la Cruz (PSL) & Shiva Ayyadurai (I) with 1% each)
Suffolk University (Note: Poll sponsored by The Boston Globe)	October 1–4, 2024	500 (LV)	± 4.4%	61%	32%	–	1%	0%	6%
University of New Hampshire	September 12–16, 2024	546 (LV)	± 4.1%	62%	31%	–	2%	0%	5%

== Michigan ==
Kamala Harris vs. Donald Trump Aggregate polls

Source of poll aggregation	Dates administered	Dates updated	Kamala Harris Democratic	Donald Trump Republican	Other / Undecided (Note: Calculated by taking the difference of 100% and all other candidates combined.)	Margin
270ToWin	October 23 – November 4, 2024	November 4, 2024	48.6%	46.8%	4.6%	Harris +1.8%
538	through November 4, 2024	November 4, 2024	48.0%	47.0%	5.0%	Harris +1.0%
Silver Bulletin	through November 4, 2024	November 4, 2024	48.4%	47.2%	4.4%	Harris +1.2%
The Hill/DDHQ	through November 4, 2024	November 4, 2024	48.7%	48.3%	3.0%	Harris +0.4%
Average			48.4%	47.3%	4.3%	Harris 1.1%

Poll source	Date(s) administered	Sample size	Margin of error	Kamala Harris Democratic	Donald Trump Republican	Other / Undecided
HarrisX	November 3–5, 2024	1,864 (RV)	± 2.3%	47%	46%	7%
HarrisX	November 3–5, 2024	1,864 (RV)	± 2.3%	50.1%	49.9%	–
HarrisX	November 3–5, 2024	1,668 (LV)	± 2.3%	48%	48%	4%
HarrisX	November 3–5, 2024	1,668 (LV)	± 2.3%	50.3%	49.7%	–
AtlasIntel	November 3–4, 2024	1,113 (LV)	± 3.0%	48%	50%	2%
Research Co.	November 2–3, 2024	450 (LV)	± 4.6%	49%	47%	4%
Trafalgar Group (R)	November 1–3, 2024	1,079 (LV)	± 2.9%	47%	48%	5%
Patriot Polling	November 1–3, 2024	858 (RV)	± 3.0%	49%	49%	2%
InsiderAdvantage (R)	November 1–2, 2024	800 (LV)	± 3.7%	47%	47%	6% (Note: "Other" with 4%)
AtlasIntel	November 1–2, 2024	1,198 (LV)	± 3.0%	48%	50%	2%
Emerson College	October 30 – November 2, 2024	790 (LV)	± 3.4%	50%	48%	2%
Emerson College	October 30 – November 2, 2024	790 (LV)	± 3.4%	51%	49%	–
Mitchell Research (Note: Poll commissioned by MIRS)	October 29 – November 2, 2024	585 (LV)	± 4.0%	50%	48%	2%
The New York Times/Siena College	October 29 – November 2, 2024	998 (RV)	± 3.5%	45%	45%	9%
The New York Times/Siena College	October 29 – November 2, 2024	998 (LV)	± 3.5%	47%	47%	6%
Mainstreet Research/Florida Atlantic University	October 25 – November 2, 2024	733 (RV)	± 3.6%	48%	46%	6% (Note: "Another Candidate" with 3%)
Mainstreet Research/Florida Atlantic University	October 25 – November 2, 2024	714 (LV)	± 3.6%	49%	47%	4% (Note: "Another Candidate" with 2%)
ActiVote	October 8 – November 2, 2024	400 (LV)	± 4.9%	50%	50%	–
Rasmussen Reports (R)	October 24 – November 1, 2024	908 (LV)	± 3.0%	49%	48%	3%
AtlasIntel	October 30–31, 2024	1,136 (LV)	± 3.0%	48.7%	49.3%	2%
OnMessage Inc. (R)	October 29–31, 2024	800 (LV)	–	48%	48%	4%
YouGov	October 25–31, 2024	985 (RV)	± 3.9%	50%	46%	4%
YouGov	October 25–31, 2024	942 (LV)	± 3.9%	50%	47%	3%
Morning Consult	October 22−31, 2024	1,108 (LV)	± 3.0%	49%	48%	3%
Marist College	October 27–30, 2024	1,356 (RV)	± 3.3%	51%	48%	1% (Note: Another Party's Candidate with 1%)
Marist College	October 27–30, 2024	1,214 (LV)	± 3.5%	51%	48%	1%
Echelon Insights	October 27–30, 2024	600 (LV)	± 4.4%	48%	48%	4%
Mitchell Research	October 28–29, 2024	– (LV)	± 2.5%	47%	48%	5%
AtlasIntel	October 25–29, 2024	938 (LV)	± 3.0%	48%	49%	3%
Quantus Insights (R) (Note: Poll sponsored by TrendingPolitics)	October 26–28, 2024	844 (LV)	± 3.4%	49%	49%	2%
The Washington Post	October 24–28, 2024	1,003 (RV)	± 3.7%	45%	47%	8%
The Washington Post	October 24–28, 2024	1,003 (LV)	± 3.7%	47%	46%	7%
Fox News	October 24–28, 2024	1,275 (RV)	± 2.5%	50%	48%	2%
Fox News	October 24–28, 2024	988 (LV)	± 3.0%	49%	49%	2%
InsiderAdvantage (R)	October 26–27, 2024	800 (LV)	± 3.7%	47%	48%	5%
Emerson College (Note: Poll sponsored by RealClearWorld)	October 25–27, 2024	1,000 (LV)	± 3.0%	48%	49%	3%
Emerson College	October 25–27, 2024	1,000 (LV)	± 3.0%	49%	50%	1%
Susquehanna Polling & Research	October 23–27, 2024	400 (LV)	± 4.9%	52%	47%	1%
Patriot Polling	October 24–26, 2024	796 (RV)	± 3.0%	49%	50%	1%
CES/YouGov	October 1–25, 2024	2,347 (A)	–	52%	45%	3%
CES/YouGov	October 1–25, 2024	2,336 (LV)	–	51%	46%	3%
Quinnipiac University	October 17–21, 2024	1,136 (LV)	± 2.9%	50%	46%	4%
Trafalgar Group (R)	October 18−20, 2024	1,090 (LV)	± 2.9%	44%	46%	10%
Bloomberg/Morning Consult	October 16–20, 2024	756 (RV)	± 4.0%	48%	46%	6%
Bloomberg/Morning Consult	October 16–20, 2024	705 (LV)	± 4.0%	50%	46%	4%
The Bullfinch Group	October 11−18, 2024	600 (LV)	± 4.0%	53%	45%	2%
The Bullfinch Group	October 11−18, 2024	600 (LV)	± 4.0%	51%	43%	6% (Note: "A third party / Independent candidate" with 3%)
AtlasIntel	October 12–17, 2024	1,529 (LV)	± 3.0%	47%	50%	3%
RMG Research	October 10–16, 2024	789 (LV)	± 3.5%	48%	48%	4% (Note: "Some other candidate" with 2%)
RMG Research	October 10–16, 2024	789 (LV)	± 3.5%	49%	49%	2%
Morning Consult	October 6−15, 2024	1,065 (LV)	± 3.0%	49%	47%	4%
The Washington Post/Schar School	September 30 – October 15, 2024	687 (RV)	± 4.6%	46%	47%	7%
The Washington Post/Schar School	September 30 – October 15, 2024	687 (LV)	± 4.6%	49%	47%	4%
Mitchell Research	October 14, 2024	589 (LV)	± 4.0%	47%	48%	5%
Rasmussen Reports (R)	October 9–14, 2024	1,058 (LV)	± 3.0%	48%	48%	4%
SoCal Strategies (R)	October 10–13, 2024	692 (LV)	± 3.7%	49%	48%	3%
Michigan State University/YouGov	September 23 – October 10, 2024	845 (LV)	–	52%	48%	–
InsiderAdvantage (R)	October 8–9, 2024	800 (LV)	± 3.7%	46%	48%	6%
Fabrizio, Lee & Associates (R)/McLaughlin & Associates (R)	October 6–9, 2024	800 (LV)	± 3.5%	48%	49%	3%
Fabrizio Ward (R)/Impact Research (D)	October 2–8, 2024	600 (LV)	± 4.0%	48%	49%	3%
ActiVote	September 15 – October 9, 2024	400 (LV)	± 4.9%	51%	49%	–
Emerson College	October 5–8, 2024	950 (LV)	± 3.1%	49%	49%	2%
Emerson College	October 5–8, 2024	950 (LV)	± 3.1%	50%	50%	–
The Wall Street Journal	September 28 – October 8, 2024	600 (RV)	± 5.0%	49%	47%	4%
Research Co.	October 5–7, 2024	450 (LV)	± 4.6%	46%	44%	10% (Note: "Some other candidate" with 1%)
Research Co.	October 5–7, 2024	450 (LV)	± 4.6%	51%	48%	1%
Quinnipiac University	October 3–7, 2024	1,007 (LV)	± 3.1%	47%	51%	2%
OnMessage Inc. (R)	September 24 – October 2, 2024	500 (LV)	± 4.4%	48%	46%	6%
Mitchell Research	September 30, 2024	709 (LV)	± 3.7%	48%	49%	3%
Trafalgar Group (R)	September 28–30, 2024	1,086 (LV)	± 2.9%	44%	47%	9%
Global Strategy Group (D)/North Star Opinion Research (R)	September 23–29, 2024	404 (LV)	± 4.9%	47%	49%	4%
RMG Research	September 24–27, 2024	789 (LV)	± 3.5%	50%	46%	4%
RMG Research	September 24–27, 2024	789 (LV)	± 3.5%	50%	47%	3%
The New York Times/Siena College	September 21–26, 2024	688 (RV)	± 4.0%	45%	47%	8%
The New York Times/Siena College	September 21–26, 2024	688 (LV)	± 4.0%	48%	47%	5%
AtlasIntel	September 20–25, 2024	918 (LV)	± 3.0%	47%	51%	2%
Cook Political Report/BSG (R)/GS Strategy Group (D)	September 19–25, 2024	416 (LV)	–	51%	48%	1%
Bloomberg/Morning Consult	September 19–25, 2024	894 (RV)	± 3.0%	49%	47%	4%
Bloomberg/Morning Consult	September 19–25, 2024	800 (LV)	± 3.0%	50%	47%	3%
Rodriguez Gudelunas Strategies (Note: Poll sponsored by Focus on Rural America)	September 19–23, 2024	400 (LV)	–	51%	45%	4%
Rasmussen Reports (R)	September 19−22, 2024	1,086 (LV)	± 3.0%	48%	48%	4%
Emerson College	September 15–18, 2024	875 (LV)	± 3.2%	49%	47%	4%
Emerson College	September 15–18, 2024	875 (LV)	± 3.2%	50%	49%	1%
Morning Consult	September 9−18, 2024	1,297 (LV)	± 3.0%	52%	44%	4%
Marist College	September 12−17, 2024	1,282 (RV)	± 3.2%	50%	47%	3%
Marist College	September 12−17, 2024	1,138 (LV)	± 3.4%	52%	47%	1%
Quinnipiac University	September 12–16, 2024	905 (LV)	± 3.3%	51%	46%	3%
InsiderAdvantage (R)	September 11–12, 2024	800 (LV)	± 3.7%	48%	49%	3%
Mitchell Research	September 11, 2024	580 (LV)	± 4.0%	48%	48%	4%
Morning Consult	August 30 – September 8, 2024	1,368 (LV)	± 3.0%	49%	46%	5%
co/efficient (R)	September 4–6, 2024	931 (LV)	± 3.2%	47%	47%	6%
CBS News/YouGov	September 3–6, 2024	1,077 (LV)	± 3.7%	50%	49%	1%
Patriot Polling	September 1–3, 2024	822 (RV)	–	48%	48%	4%
Cygnal (R)	August 28 – September 1, 2024	600 (LV)	± 4.0%	47%	46%	7%
Trafalgar Group (R)	August 28–30, 2024	1,089 (LV)	± 2.9%	47%	47%	6%
Emerson College	August 25–28, 2024	800 (LV)	± 3.4%	50%	47%	3%
Emerson College	August 25–28, 2024	800 (LV)	± 3.4%	51%	48%	1%
ActiVote	July 28 – August 28, 2024	400 (LV)	± 4.9%	50%	50%	–
EPIC-MRA	August 23–26, 2024	600 (LV)	± 4.0%	46%	47%	7%
Bloomberg/Morning Consult	August 23–26, 2024	651 (LV)	± 4.0%	49%	47%	4%
Bloomberg/Morning Consult	August 23–26, 2024	702 (RV)	± 4.0%	49%	46%	5%
	August 23, 2024	Robert F. Kennedy Jr. suspends his presidential campaign and endorses Donald Trump.				
YouGov (Note: Poll conducted for the Cato Institute)	August 15–23, 2024	500 (A)	± 5.0%	44%	44%	12% (Note: "Will not vote" with 4%)
YouGov	August 15–23, 2024	– (LV)	± 6.0%	47%	48%	5%
TIPP Insights	August 20–22, 2024	741 (LV)	± 3.7%	48%	46%	6%
	August 19–22, 2024	Democratic National Convention				
Fabrizio Ward (R) (Note: Poll conducted for the Pinpoint Policy Institute)	August 19–21, 2024	400 (LV)	± 4.9%	46%	48%	6%
Rasmussen Reports (R)	August 13–19, 2024	1,093 (LV)	± 3.0%	48%	47%	5%
Focaldata	August 6–16, 2024	702 (LV)	± 3.7%	53%	47%	–
The Bullfinch Group	August 8–11, 2024	500 (RV)	± 4.4%	48%	43%	9%
Fabrizio Ward (R)/Impact Research (D)	August 7–11, 2024	600 (LV)	± 4.0%	48%	48%	4%
InsiderAdvantage (R)	August 6–8, 2024	800 (LV)	–	49%	47%	4%
The New York Times/Siena College	August 5–8, 2024	619 (RV)	± 4.8%	45%	48%	7%
The New York Times/Siena College	August 5–8, 2024	619 (LV)	± 4.8%	50%	46%	5%
Navigator Research (D)	July 31 – August 8, 2024	600 (LV)	± 4.0%	47%	46%	7%
Cook Political Report/BSG (R)/GS Strategy Group (D)	July 26 – August 8, 2024	406 (LV)	–	49%	46%	6%
Public Opinion Strategies (R)	July 23–29, 2024	400 (LV)	± 4.9%	45%	45%	10%
Bloomberg/Morning Consult	July 24–28, 2024	706 (RV)	± 4.0%	53%	42%	4%
SoCal Strategies (R) (Note: Poll sponsored by Red Eagle Politics)	July 25–26, 2024	500 (RV)	± 4.4%	46%	49%	5%
Fox News	July 22–24, 2024	1,012 (RV)	± 3.0%	49%	49%	2%
Emerson College	July 22–23, 2024	800 (RV)	± 3.4%	45%	46%	9%
Emerson College	July 22–23, 2024	800 (RV)	± 3.4%	49%	51%	–
	July 21, 2024	Joe Biden announces his withdrawal; Kamala Harris declares her candidacy.				
	July 19, 2024	Republican National Convention concludes				
	July 13, 2024	Attempted assassination of Donald Trump				
Public Policy Polling (D)	July 11–12, 2024	568 (RV)	–	46%	48%	6%
Bloomberg/Morning Consult	May 7–13, 2024	704 (RV)	± 4.0%	44%	47%	9%
The New York Times/Siena College	October 22 – November 3, 2023	616 (RV)	± 4.4%	45%	47%	8%
The New York Times/Siena College	October 22 – November 3, 2023	616 (LV)	± 4.4%	48%	46%	6%

Kamala Harris vs. Donald Trump vs. Cornel West vs. Jill Stein vs. Chase Oliver

Poll source	Date(s) administered	Sample size	Margin of error	Kamala Harris Democratic	Donald Trump Republican	Cornel West Independent	Jill Stein Green	Chase Oliver Libertarian	Other / Undecided
HarrisX	November 3–5, 2024	1,864 (RV)	± 2.3%	46%	45%	1%	0%	–	8%
HarrisX	November 3–5, 2024	1,864 (RV)	± 2.3%	48.6%	48.3%	2.1%	1.0%	–	–
HarrisX	November 3–5, 2024	1,668 (LV)	± 2.3%	48%	48%	1%	1%	–	2%
HarrisX	November 3–5, 2024	1,668 (LV)	± 2.3%	49.5%	48.8%	1.1%	0.7%	–	–
AtlasIntel	November 3–4, 2024	1,113 (LV)	± 3.0%	48%	50%	–	2%	0%	–
AtlasIntel	November 1–2, 2024	1,198 (LV)	± 3.0%	48%	49%	–	2%	0%	1%
The New York Times/Siena College	October 29 – November 2, 2024	998 (RV)	± 3.5%	42%	44%	1%	2%	2%	9%
The New York Times/Siena College	October 29 – November 2, 2024	998 (LV)	± 3.5%	45%	45%	0%	2%	1%	7%
Focaldata	October 3 – November 1, 2024	2,092 (LV)	–	50%	45%	–	1%	1%	3%
Focaldata	October 3 – November 1, 2024	1,941 (RV)	± 2.1%	51%	44%	–	1%	1%	3%
Focaldata	October 3 – November 1, 2024	2,092 (A)	–	50%	44%	–	1%	1%	4%
AtlasIntel	October 30–31, 2024	1,136 (LV)	± 3.0%	48%	49%	–	2%	0%	1%
Redfield & Wilton Strategies	October 28–31, 2024	1,731 (LV)	–	47%	47%	–	1%	1%	4%
YouGov	October 25–31, 2024	985 (RV)	± 3.9%	47%	45%	0%	2%	–	6%
YouGov	October 25–31, 2024	942 (LV)	± 3.9%	48%	45%	0%	2%	–	5%
AtlasIntel	October 25–29, 2024	938 (LV)	± 3.0%	48%	49%	–	2%	0%	1%
Redfield & Wilton Strategies	October 25–27, 2024	728 (LV)	–	49%	48%	–	1%	0%	2%
Redfield & Wilton Strategies	October 20–22, 2024	1,115 (LV)	–	47%	47%	–	1%	0%	5%
Quinnipiac University	October 17–21, 2024	1,136 (LV)	± 2.9%	49%	46%	1%	1%	0%	3% (Note: Randall Terry (C) with 0%)
Bloomberg/Morning Consult	October 16–20, 2024	756 (RV)	± 4.0%	47%	45%	–	1%	2%	5%
Bloomberg/Morning Consult	October 16–20, 2024	705 (LV)	± 4.0%	49%	46%	–	1%	2%	2%
Redfield & Wilton Strategies	October 16–18, 2024	1,008 (LV)	–	47%	47%	–	0%	1%	5%
Redfield & Wilton Strategies	October 12–14, 2024	682 (LV)	–	47%	47%	–	0%	1%	5%
Quinnipiac University	October 3–7, 2024	1,007 (LV)	± 3.1%	47%	50%	1%	0%	1%	1%
Redfield & Wilton Strategies	September 27 – October 2, 2024	839 (LV)	–	48%	46%	–	0%	1%	5%
The New York Times/Siena College	September 21–26, 2024	688 (RV)	± 4.0%	43%	46%	–	2%	2%	7%
The New York Times/Siena College	September 21–26, 2024	688 (LV)	± 4.0%	46%	46%	–	2%	1%	5%
Bloomberg/Morning Consult	September 19–25, 2024	894 (RV)	± 3.0%	49%	45%	–	1%	2%	3%
Bloomberg/Morning Consult	September 19–25, 2024	800 (LV)	± 3.0%	50%	46%	–	1%	1%	2%
Remington Research Group (R) (Note: Poll sponsored by American Fuel & Petrochemical Manufacturers, a group that supports Republican candidates)	September 16–20, 2024	800 (LV)	± 3.5%	49%	47%	0%	1%	–	3%
Redfield & Wilton Strategies	September 16–19, 2024	993 (LV)	–	46%	45%	–	0%	1%	8%
Quinnipiac University	September 12–16, 2024	905 (LV)	± 3.3%	50%	45%	0%	2%	0%	3%
Redfield & Wilton Strategies	September 6–9, 2024	556 (LV)	–	48%	45%	–	1%	1%	5%
YouGov	August 23 – September 3, 2024	1,000 (RV)	± 3.6%	48%	43%	1%	1%	–	7%
Redfield & Wilton Strategies	August 25–28, 2024	1,071 (LV)	–	47%	44%	–	1%	1%	7%
Bloomberg/Morning Consult	August 23–26, 2024	651 (LV)	± 4.0%	49%	47%	–	0%	2%	2%
Bloomberg/Morning Consult	August 23–26, 2024	702 (RV)	± 4.0%	48%	46%	–	1%	2%	3%

Kamala Harris vs. Donald Trump vs. Robert F. Kennedy Jr. vs. Cornel West vs. Jill Stein vs. Chase Oliver

Aggregate polls

Source of poll aggregation	Dates administered	Dates updated	Kamala Harris Democratic	Donald Trump Republican	Robert F. Kennedy Jr. (Note: Kennedy suspended his campaign, but he remains on the ballot in Michigan.) Natural Law	Jill Stein Green	Cornel West Independent	Chase Oliver Libertarian	Others/ Undecided	Margin
Race to the WH	through October 7, 2024	October 13, 2024	47.0%	46.9%	1.9%	0.9%	0.6%	—N/a	2.7%	Harris +0.1%
270toWin	October 7 – 11, 2024	October 11, 2024	47.0%	46.6%	2.3%	0.3%	1.0%	0.8%	2.0%	Harris +0.4%
Average			47.0%	46.8%	2.1%	0.6%	0.8%	0.8%	1.9%	Harris +0.2%

Poll source	Date(s) administered	Sample size	Margin of error	Kamala Harris Democratic	Donald Trump Republican	Robert Kennedy Jr Natural Law	Cornel West Independent	Jill Stein Green	Chase Oliver Libertarian	Other / Undecided
Mitchell Research	October 29 – November 2, 2024	585 (LV)	± 4.0%	49%	48%	0%	1%	1%	1%	–
Echelon Insights	October 27–30, 2024	600 (LV)	± 4.4%	47%	47%	1%	0%	0%	0%	5%
EPIC-MRA (Note: Poll sponsored by The Detroit Free Press)	October 24–28, 2024	600 (LV)	± 4.0%	48%	45%	3%	1%	3%	–	–
Fox News	October 24–28, 2024	1,275 (RV)	± 2.5%	49%	45%	3%	1%	0%	1%	1%
Fox News	October 24–28, 2024	988 (LV)	± 3.0%	48%	46%	3%	1%	0%	1%	1%
CNN/SSRS	October 23–28, 2024	726 (LV)	± 4.7%	48%	43%	3%	1%	2%	0%	3%
Suffolk University/USA Today	October 24–27, 2024	500 (LV)	± 4.4%	47%	47%	1%	1%	1%	0%	3% (Note: Joseph Kishore (SEP) & Randall Terry (C) with 0% each)
Glengariff Group (Note: Poll commissioned by The Detroit News & WDIV-TV)	October 22–24, 2024	600 (LV)	± 4.0%	47%	44%	4%	–	2%	1%	2%
University of Massachusetts Lowell/YouGov	October 16–24, 2024	600 (LV)	± 4.5%	49%	45%	1%	0%	0%	1%	4%
AtlasIntel	October 12–17, 2024	1,529 (LV)	± 3.0%	47%	50%	1%	0%	1%	0%	1%
Mitchell Research	October 14, 2024	589 (LV)	± 4.0%	47%	47%	0%	0%	1%	1%	4%
Marketing Resource Group	October 7–11, 2024	600 (LV)	± 4.0%	45%	44%	3%	–	2%	–	6% (Note: "Other" with 2%; "Refused" with 1%)
Fabrizio Ward (R)/Impact Research (D)	October 2–8, 2024	600 (LV)	± 4.0%	46%	46%	3%	0%	1%	0%	4%
The Wall Street Journal	September 28 – October 8, 2024	600 (RV)	± 5.0%	47%	45%	2%	1%	1%	1%	3%
Glengariff Group	October 1–4, 2024	600 (LV)	± 4.0%	47%	44%	5%	1%	1%	1%	1%
Mitchell Research	September 30, 2024	709 (LV)	± 3.7%	47%	47%	2%	0%	1%	1%	2%
Global Strategy Group (D)/North Star Opinion Research (R)	September 23–29, 2024	404 (LV)	± 4.9%	46%	48%	2%	1%	0%	0%	3%
AtlasIntel	September 20–25, 2024	918 (LV)	± 3.0%	47%	50%	0%	–	2%	0%	1%
Cook Political Report/BSG (R)/GS Strategy Group (D)	September 19–25, 2024	416 (LV)	–	49%	46%	0%	1%	2%	–	2%
University of Massachusetts Lowell/YouGov	September 11–19, 2024	650 (LV)	± 4.4%	48%	43%	2%	–	2%	2%	3% (Note: Randall Terry (C), Joseph Kishore (SEP), & Shiva Ayyadurai (I) with 0% each)
Suffolk University/USA Today	September 16–18, 2024	500 (LV)	± 4.4%	48%	45%	1%	0%	0%	0%	6%
Mitchell Research	September 11, 2024	580 (LV)	± 4.0%	47%	46%	2%	0%	1%	–	4%
CNN/SSRS	August 23–29, 2024	708 (LV)	± 4.9%	48%	43%	4%	–	1%	1%	3%
Z to A Research (D) (Note: Poll conducted for Rust Belt Rising, which supports Democratic candidates)	August 23–26, 2024	518 (LV)	–	47%	47%	3%	–	1%	1%	1%
YouGov	August 15–23, 2024	500 (A)	± 5.0%	44%	42%	5%	1%	0%	1%	7% (Note: "Will not vote" with 4%)
YouGov	August 15–23, 2024	– (LV)	± 6.0%	47%	46%	4%	0%	0%	0%	3%
TIPP Insights	August 20–22, 2024	741 (LV)	± 3.7%	46%	45%	5%	1%	1%	–	2%
Rasmussen Reports (R)	August 13–17, 2024	1,093 (LV)	–	47%	44%	4%	1%	1%	–	3%
Focaldata	August 6–16, 2024	702 (LV)	± 3.7%	51%	44%	4%	–	1%	0%	–
Focaldata	August 6–16, 2024	702 (RV)	± 3.7%	50%	44%	4%	–	1%	0%	1%
Focaldata	August 6–16, 2024	702 (A)	± 3.7%	50%	42%	5%	–	1%	0%	2%
Redfield & Wilton Strategies	August 12–15, 2024	530 (LV)	–	44%	45%	5%	–	1%	0%	5%
The Bullfinch Group	August 8–11, 2024	500 (RV)	± 4.4%	46%	40%	7%	1%	1%	–	5%
Fabrizio Ward (R)/Impact Research (D)	August 7–11, 2024	600 (LV)	± 4.0%	43%	45%	6%	1%	1%	0%	4%
The New York Times/Siena College	August 5–8, 2024	619 (RV)	± 4.8%	44%	43%	5%	0%	1%	0%	6%
The New York Times/Siena College	August 5–8, 2024	619 (LV)	± 4.8%	48%	43%	4%	0%	1%	0%	3%
Navigator Research (D)	July 31 – August 8, 2024	600 (LV)	± 4.0%	44%	44%	5%	1%	0%	0%	6%
Cook Political Report/BSG (R)/GS Strategy Group (D)	July 26 – August 8, 2024	406 (LV)	–	46%	44%	6%	1%	0%	–	3%
Redfield & Wilton Strategies	July 31 – August 3, 2024	771 (LV)	–	41%	42%	5%	–	1%	0%	11%
Bloomberg/Morning Consult	July 24–28, 2024	706 (RV)	± 4.0%	51%	39%	5%	–	1%	2%	2%
Fox News	July 22–24, 2024	1,012 (RV)	± 3.0%	43%	45%	7%	1%	1%	0%	3%
Redfield & Wilton Strategies	July 22–24, 2024	512 (LV)	–	41%	44%	7%	–	0%	0%	8%
Glengariff Group	July 22–24, 2024	600 (LV)	± 4.0%	42%	41%	10%	–	1%	1%	5%
Emerson College	July 22–23, 2024	800 (RV)	± 3.4%	44%	44%	5%	1%	1%	0%	5%

Kamala Harris vs. Donald Trump vs. Robert F. Kennedy Jr. vs. Jill Stein

Poll source	Date(s) administered	Sample size	Margin of error	Kamala Harris Democratic	Donald Trump Republican	Robert F. Kennedy Jr. Independent	Jill Stein Green	Other / Undecided
Glengariff Group	August 26–28, 2024	600 (LV)	± 4.0%	44%	45%	5%	1%	5%
EPIC-MRA	August 23–26, 2024	600 (LV)	± 4.0%	45%	46%	3%	1%	5%
Public Policy Polling (D) (Note: Poll conducted for Clean and Prosperous America PAC)	July 17–18, 2024	650 (RV)	± 3.9%	41%	46%	5%	1%	7%

Kamala Harris vs. Donald Trump vs. Robert F. Kennedy Jr.

Poll source	Date(s) administered	Sample size	Margin of error	Kamala Harris Democratic	Donald Trump Republican	Robert F. Kennedy Jr. Independent	Other / Undecided
Fabrizio Ward (R)	August 19–21, 2024	400 (LV)	± 4.9%	44%	43%	5%	8%
Civiqs	July 13–16, 2024	532 (RV)	± 5.3%	46%	46%	5%	3%

== Minnesota ==
Kamala Harris vs. Donald Trump

Aggregate polls

Source of poll aggregation	Dates administered	Dates updated	Kamala Harris Democratic	Donald Trump Republican	Undecided (Note: Calculated by taking the difference of 100% and all other candidates combined.)	Margin
270ToWin	October 16 – November 4, 2024	November 4, 2024	49.8%	43.6%	6.6%	Harris +6.2%
538	through November 4, 2024	November 4, 2024	50.0%	44.2%	5.8%	Harris +5.8%
Silver Bulletin	through November 3, 2024	November 3, 2024	50.4%	43.9%	5.7%	Harris +6.5%
The Hill/DDHQ	through November 3, 2024	November 3, 2024	49.9%	45.5%	4.6%	Harris +4.4%
Average			50.0%	44.3%	5.7%	Harris +5.7%

Poll source	Date(s) administered	Sample size	Margin of error	Kamala Harris Democratic	Donald Trump Republican	Other / Undecided
AtlasIntel	November 3–4, 2024	2,065 (LV)	± 2.0%	49%	47%	4%
Research Co.	November 2–3, 2024	450 (LV)	± 4.6%	51%	44%	5%
ActiVote	October 9 – November 1, 2024	400 (LV)	± 4.9%	52%	48%	–
SurveyUSA (Note: Poll sponsored by KSTP-TV, WDIO-TV, & KAAL-TV)	October 24–28, 2024	728 (LV)	± 4.0%	51%	43%	5%
Rasmussen Reports (R)	October 24–26, 2024	959 (LV)	± 3.0%	50%	47%	3%
CES/YouGov	October 1–25, 2024	1,278 (A)	–	52%	44%	4%
CES/YouGov	October 1–25, 2024	1,275 (LV)	–	53%	43%	4%
Embold Research/MinnPost	October 16–22, 2024	1,734 (LV)	± 2.4%	48%	45%	7%
ActiVote	September 10 – October 9, 2024	400 (LV)	± 4.9%	53%	47%	–
SurveyUSA	September 23–26, 2024	646 (LV)	± 4.3%	50%	44%	6%
Rasmussen Reports (R)	September 19–22, 2024	993 (LV)	± 3.0%	49%	46%	5%
Mason-Dixon (Note: Poll commissioned by Split Ticket)	September 16–18, 2024	800 (LV)	± 3.5%	48%	43%	9%
Morning Consult	September 9–18, 2024	517 (LV)	± 4.0%	50%	43%	7%
Embold Research/MinnPost	September 4–8, 2024	1,616 (LV)	± 2.8%	49%	45%	6% (Note: "Another candidate" with 4%)
Morning Consult	August 30 – September 8, 2024	501 (LV)	± 4.0%	51%	44%	5%
SurveyUSA	August 27–29, 2024	635 (LV)	± 4.5%	48%	43%	9%
	August 23, 2024	Robert F. Kennedy Jr. suspends his presidential campaign and endorses Donald Trump.				
	August 19–22, 2024	Democratic National Convention				
SurveyUSA	July 23–25, 2024	656 (LV)	± 4.4%	50%	40%	10% (Note: "Other" with 4%)
Fox News	July 22–24, 2024	1,071 (RV)	± 3.0%	52%	46%	2%

Kamala Harris vs. Donald Trump vs. Cornel West vs. Jill Stein vs. Chase Oliver

Poll source	Date(s) administered	Sample size	Margin of error	Kamala Harris Democratic	Donald Trump Republican	Cornel West Independent	Jill Stein Green	Chase Oliver Libertarian	Other / Undecided
AtlasIntel	November 3–4, 2024	2,065 (LV)	± 2.0%	49%	47%	–	2%	1%	1%
Redfield & Wilton Strategies	October 12–14, 2024	544 (LV)	–	51%	43%	–	1%	0%	5%
Redfield & Wilton Strategies	September 27 – October 2, 2024	551 (LV)	–	51%	43%	–	0%	1%	5%
Redfield & Wilton Strategies	September 16–19, 2024	703 (LV)	–	50%	44%	–	1%	0%	5%
Redfield & Wilton Strategies	September 6–9, 2024	617 (LV)	–	51%	44%	–	0%	0%	5%

Kamala Harris vs. Donald Trump vs. Robert F. Kennedy Jr. vs. Cornel West vs. Jill Stein vs. Chase Oliver

Poll source	Date(s) administered	Sample size	Margin of error	Kamala Harris Democratic	Donald Trump Republican	Robert Kennedy Jr Independent	Cornel West Independent	Jill Stein Green	Chase Oliver Libertarian	Other / Undecided
Chism Strategies	October 28–30, 2024	534 (LV)	± 4.2%	48%	43%	1%	–	1%	0%	7% (Note: "Someone else" with 2%)
Redfield & Wilton Strategies	August 12–15, 2024	592 (LV)	–	47%	40%	3%	–	0%	0%	10%
Redfield & Wilton Strategies	July 31 – August 3, 2024	538 (LV)	–	46%	41%	3%	–	0%	0%	10%
Redfield & Wilton Strategies	July 22–24, 2024	475 (LV)	–	44%	41%	6%	–	1%	0%	8%
Fox News	July 22–24, 2024	1,071 (RV)	± 3.0%	47%	41%	7%	1%	1%	–	3%

== Missouri ==
Donald J. Trump vs. Kamala Harris

Poll source	Date(s) administered	Sample size	Margin of error	Donald J. Trump Republican	Kamala Harris Democratic	Other / Undecided
Research Co.	November 2–3, 2024	450 (LV)	± 4.6%	54%	39%	7%
ActiVote	October 6–27, 2024	400 (LV)	± 4.9%	58%	42%	–
ActiVote	September 8 – October 10, 2024	400 (LV)	± 4.9%	57%	43%	–
Emerson College	September 12–13, 2024	850 (LV)	± 3.3%	53%	43%	4%
Emerson College	September 12–13, 2024	850 (LV)	± 3.3%	55%	43%	2%
Change Research (D)	September 11–13, 2024	1,237 (RV)	± 3.1%	50%	41%	9%
GQR (D)	September 6–12, 2024	645 (LV)	± 3.9%	55%	44%	1%
	August 23, 2024	Robert F. Kennedy Jr. suspends his presidential campaign and endorses Donald J. Trump.				
	August 19–22, 2024	Democratic National Convention				
ActiVote	July 25 – August 22, 2024	400 (LV)	± 4.9%	59%	41%	–
YouGov/Saint Louis University	August 8–16, 2024	900 (LV)	± 3.8%	54%	41%	5% (Note: "Other" with 3%)

Donald J. Trump vs. Kamala Harris vs. Cornel West vs. Jill Stein vs. Chase Oliver

Poll source	Date(s) administered	Sample size	Margin of error	Donald J. Trump Republican	Kamala Harris Democratic	Cornel West Independent	Jill Stein Green	Chase Oliver Libertarian	Other / Undecided
Remington Research Group (R)/Missouri Scout	October 28–29, 2024	721 (LV)	± 3.6%	54%	40%	–	1%	1%	4%

== Montana ==
Donald Trump vs. Kamala Harris

Poll source	Date(s) administered	Sample size	Margin of error	Donald Trump Republican	Kamala Harris Democratic	Other / Undecided
AtlasIntel	November 3–4, 2024	752 (LV)	± 4.0%	59%	39%	2%
Emerson College (Note: Poll sponsored by Nexstar Media Group)	October 23–25, 2024	1,000 (LV)	± 3.0%	58%	39%	3%
Emerson College	October 23–25, 2024	1,000 (LV)	± 3.0%	59%	40%	1%
New York Times/Siena College	October 5–8, 2024	656 (RV)	± 4.0%	57%	39%	4%
New York Times/Siena College	October 5–8, 2024	656 (LV)	± 4.0%	57%	40%	3%
RMG Research	September 12–19, 2024	491 (LV)	± 4.4%	59%	38%	3% (Note: "Some other candidate" with 1%)
Fabrizio Ward (R)/ David Binder Research (D)	August 25–29, 2024	600 (LV)	± 4.0%	56%	41%	3%
	August 23, 2024	Robert F. Kennedy Jr. suspends his presidential campaign and endorses Donald Trump.				
	August 22, 2024	Democratic National Convention concludes				
Rasmussen Reports (R)	August 13–20, 2024	835 (LV)	± 3.0%	58%	35%	7%
	August 19, 2024	Democratic National Convention begins				
Emerson College	August 5–6, 2024	1,000 (RV)	3.0%	55%	40%	5%
Emerson College	August 5–6, 2024	1,000 (RV)	3.0%	58%	43%	–

Donald Trump vs. Kamala Harris vs. Cornel West vs. Jill Stein vs. Chase Oliver

Poll source	Date(s) administered	Sample size	Margin of error	Donald Trump Republican	Kamala Harris Democratic	Cornel West Independent	Jill Stein Green	Chase Oliver Libertarian	Other / Undecided
AtlasIntel	November 3–4, 2024	752 (LV)	± 4.0%	57%	37%	–	2%	0%	4%
New York Times/Siena College	October 5–8, 2024	656 (RV)	± 4.0%	56%	38%	–	0%	0%	6%
New York Times/Siena College	October 5–8, 2024	656 (LV)	± 4.0%	56%	39%	–	0%	0%	5%
Remington Research Group (R)	September 16–20, 2024	800 (LV)	± 3.5%	56%	39%	–	2%	–	3%

Donald Trump vs. Kamala Harris vs. Robert F. Kennedy Jr. vs. Cornel West vs. Jill Stein vs. Chase Oliver

Poll source	Date(s) administered	Sample size	Margin of error	Donald Trump Republican	Kamala Harris Democratic	Robert F. Kennedy Jr. Independent	Cornel West Independent	Jill Stein Green	Chase Oliver Libertarian	Other / Undecided
Montana State University Billings	September 30 – October 16, 2024	760 (A)	± 3.6%	52%	34%	3%	–	1%	2%	8%
Rasmussen Reports (R)	August 13–20, 2024	835 (LV)	± 3.0%	58%	31%	7%	0%	0%	0%	4%
American Pulse Research & Polling (Note: Poll sponsored by KULR-TV)	August 10–12, 2024	538 (LV)	± 4.2%	52%	38%	6%	0%	0%	2%	8%
Emerson College	August 5–6, 2024	1,000 (RV)	± 3.0%	54%	39%	5%	0%	0%	0%	2%

Donald Trump vs. Kamala Harris vs. Robert F. Kennedy Jr.

Poll source	Date(s) administered	Sample size	Margin of error	Donald Trump Republican	Kamala Harris Democratic	Robert F. Kennedy Jr. Independent	Other / Undecided
RMG Research	August 6–14, 2024	540 (RV)	± 4.2%	57%	39%	2%	2%

== Nebraska ==
Statewide

Poll source	Date(s) administered	Sample size	Margin of error	Donald Trump Republican	Kamala Harris Democratic	Other / Undecided
Change Research (D) (Note: Poll sponsored by the campaign of Dan Osborn, an independent candidate for Nebraska's Class 1 Senate seat)	October 30–31, 2024	600 (LV)	± 4.3%	57%	39%	4%
Torchlight Strategies (R) (Note: Poll sponsored by the campaign of U.S. Senator Deb Fischer, who has endorsed Trump)	October 25–28, 2024	605 (LV)	± 3.9%	56%	39%	5%
New York Times/Siena College	October 23−26, 2024	1,194 (RV)	± 3.2%	55%	40%	5%
New York Times/Siena College	October 23−26, 2024	1,194 (LV)	± 3.2%	55%	40%	5%
Change Research (D)	October 18–21, 2024	815 (LV)	–	55%	41%	4%
Torchlight Strategies (R)	October 5–8, 2024	600 (LV)	± 4.9%	57%	37%	6%
Change Research (D)	October 3–8, 2024	895 (LV)	± 3.5%	58%	38%	4%
Impact Research (D)	October 1–3, 2024	600 (LV)	± 4.0%	58%	38%	4%
The Bullfinch Group	September 27 – October 1, 2024	400 (LV)	± 4.9%	53%	42%	5%
The Bullfinch Group	September 27 – October 1, 2024	400 (LV)	± 4.9%	48%	38%	14% (Note: "A third party / Independent candidate" with 7%)
SurveyUSA	September 20–23, 2024	558 (LV)	± 4.8%	56%	40%	5% (Note: "Other" with 3%; "Undecided" with 2%)
Global Strategy Group (D) (Note: Poll sponsored by Retire Career Politicians PAC)	August 26–29, 2024	600 (LV)	–	54%	37%	9%
SurveyUSA	August 23–27, 2024	1,293 (RV)	± 3.5%	54%	37%	9% (Note: "Other" with 4%)

Poll source	Date(s) administered	Sample size	Margin of error	Donald Trump Republican	Kamala Harris Democratic	Cornel West Independent	Jill Stein Green	Chase Oliver Libertarian	Other / Undecided
The Economist/YouGov	October 21–28, 2024	1,206 (LV)	± 3.5%	55%	40%	0%	0%	1%	4%
New York Times/Siena College	October 23−26, 2024	1,194 (RV)	± 3.2%	53%	38%	0%	0%	1%	8%
New York Times/Siena College	October 23−26, 2024	1,194 (LV)	± 3.2%	53%	39%	0%	0%	1%	7%

1st congressional district

Donald Trump vs. Kamala Harris vs.Cornel West vs. Jill Stein vs. Chase Oliver

Poll source	Date(s) administered	Sample size	Margin of error	Donald Trump Republican	Kamala Harris Democratic	Cornel West Independent	Jill Stein Green	Chase Oliver Libertarian	Other / Undecided
The Economist/YouGov	October 21–28, 2024	408 (LV)	–	51%	43%	0%	0%	3%	3%

2nd congressional district

Poll source	Date(s) administered	Sample size	Margin of error	Kamala Harris Democratic	Donald Trump Republican	Other / Undecided
New York Times/Siena College	October 23−26, 2024	500 (LV)	± 4.8%	54%	42%	4%
New York Times/Siena College	September 24–26, 2024	680 (RV)	± 4.0%	51%	42%	7%
New York Times/Siena College	September 24–26, 2024	680 (LV)	± 4.0%	52%	43%	5%
SurveyUSA	August 23–27, 2024	507 (RV)	± 5.6%	47%	42%	11% (Note: "Other" with 5%)

Poll source	Date(s) administered	Sample size	Margin of error	Kamala Harris Democratic	Donald Trump Republican	Cornel West Independent	Jill Stein Green	Chase Oliver Libertarian	Other / Undecided
The Economist/YouGov	October 21–28, 2024	393 (LV)	–	52%	44%	0%	1%	1%	2%
New York Times/Siena College	October 23−26, 2024	500 (LV)	± 4.8%	53%	41%	0%	0%	1%	5%
New York Times/Siena College	September 24–26, 2024	680 (RV)	± 4.0%	49%	41%	–	2%	2%	6%
New York Times/Siena College	September 24–26, 2024	680 (LV)	± 4.0%	51%	42%	–	2%	1%	4%
CNN/SSRS	September 20–25, 2024	794 (LV)	± 4.0%	53%	42%	1%	1%	1%	2%

3rd congressional district

Donald Trump vs. Kamala Harris vs.Cornel West vs. Jill Stein vs. Chase Oliver

Poll source	Date(s) administered	Sample size	Margin of error	Donald Trump Republican	Kamala Harris Democratic	Cornel West Independent	Jill Stein Green	Chase Oliver Libertarian	Other / Undecided
The Economist/YouGov	October 21–28, 2024	404 (LV)	–	70%	25%	0%	0%	0%	5%

== Nevada ==
Kamala Harris vs. Donald Trump

Aggregate polls

Source of poll aggregation	Dates administered	Dates updated	Kamala Harris Democratic	Donald Trump Republican	Other / Undecided	Margin
270ToWin	October 22 – November 4, 2024	November 4, 2024	47.6%	48.2%	4.2%	Trump +0.6%
538	through November 4, 2024	November 4, 2024	47.4%	47.7%	4.8%	Trump +0.3%
Silver Bulletin	through November 4, 2024	November 5, 2024	47.9%	48.5%	3.6%	Trump +0.6%
The Hill/DDHQ	through November 4, 2024	November 5, 2024	47.5%	49.2%	3.3%	Trump +1.7%
Average			47.6%	48.3%	4.1%	Trump +0.7%

Poll source	Date(s) administered	Sample size	Margin of error	Kamala Harris Democratic	Donald Trump Republican	Other / Undecided
HarrisX	November 3–5, 2024	1,260 (RV)	± 2.8%	47%	46%	7%
HarrisX	November 3–5, 2024	1,260 (RV)	± 2.8%	51.6%	48.5%	–
HarrisX	November 3–5, 2024	1,125 (LV)	± 2.8%	48%	48%	4%
HarrisX	November 3–5, 2024	1,125 (LV)	± 2.8%	50.5%	49.5%	–
AtlasIntel	November 3–4, 2024	707 (LV)	± 4.0%	47%	50%	3%
AtlasIntel	November 3–4, 2024	707 (LV)	± 4.0%	47%	50%	3% (Note: "Blank / null / won't vote" with 1%)
Patriot Polling	November 1–3, 2024	792 (RV)	± 3.0%	49%	50%	1%
AtlasIntel	November 1–2, 2024	782 (LV)	± 4.0%	46%	52%	2%
AtlasIntel	November 1–2, 2024	782 (LV)	± 4.0%	46%	51%	3%
Emerson College	October 30 – November 2, 2024	840 (LV)	± 3.3%	48%	48%	4% (Note: "Someone else" & None of these candidates with 1% each)
Emerson College	October 30 – November 2, 2024	840 (LV)	± 3.3%	49%	49%	1%
The New York Times/Siena College	October 24 – November 2, 2024	1,010 (RV)	± 3.5%	48%	46%	6%
The New York Times/Siena College	October 24 – November 2, 2024	1,010 (LV)	± 3.5%	49%	46%	5%
AtlasIntel	October 30–31, 2024	845 (LV)	± 3.0%	47%	51%	2%
AtlasIntel	October 30–31, 2024	845 (LV)	± 3.0%	47%	51%	2%
Emerson College (Note: Poll sponsored by RealClearWorld)	October 29–31, 2024	700 (LV)	± 3.6%	48%	47%	5% (Note: "Someone else" with 2%; None of these candidates with 1%)
Emerson College	October 29–31, 2024	700 (LV)	± 3.6%	49%	48%	3%
Noble Predictive Insights	October 28–31, 2024	593 (LV)	± 4.0%	49%	48%	3%
Susquehanna Polling & Research	October 28–31, 2024	400 (LV)	± 4.9%	44%	50%	6%
YouGov	October 25–31, 2024	790 (RV)	± 4.6%	50%	49%	1%
YouGov	October 25–31, 2024	773 (LV)	± 4.6%	50%	49%	1%
Data for Progress (D)	October 25–30, 2024	721 (LV)	± 4.0%	49%	47%	4%
Rasmussen Reports (R)	October 25–30, 2024	767 (LV)	± 3.0%	47%	49%	4%
AtlasIntel	October 25–29, 2024	1,083 (LV)	± 3.0%	48%	49%	3%
AtlasIntel	October 25–29, 2024	1,083 (LV)	± 3.0%	48%	48%	4%
Trafalgar Group (R)	October 25–28, 2024	1,082 (LV)	± 2.9%	48%	48%	4%
CES/YouGov	October 1–25, 2024	940 (A)	–	53%	44%	3%
CES/YouGov	October 1–25, 2024	933 (LV)	–	51%	47%	2%
InsiderAdvantage (R)	October 20–21, 2024	800 (LV)	± 3.5%	48%	48%	4%
Bloomberg/Morning Consult	October 16–20, 2024	449 (RV)	± 5.0%	49%	48%	3%
Bloomberg/Morning Consult	October 16–20, 2024	420 (LV)	± 5.0%	49%	48%	3%
AtlasIntel	October 12–17, 2024	1,171 (LV)	± 3.0%	48%	48%	4%
Fabrizio Ward (R)/Impact Research (D)	October 8−15, 2024	600 (LV)	± 4.0%	47%	49%	4% (Note: None of these candidates with 2%)
Morning Consult	October 6−15, 2024	496 (LV)	± 4.0%	49%	45%	6%
Revere Solutions/Providence	October 22–23, 2024	538 (LV)	± 4.0%	46.8%	50.6%	2.6%
The Washington Post/Schar School	September 30 – October 15, 2024	652 (RV)	± 4.8%	47%	44%	9%
The Washington Post/Schar School	September 30 – October 15, 2024	652 (LV)	± 4.8%	48%	48%	4%
Rasmussen Reports (R)	October 9–14, 2024	748 (LV)	± 3.0%	47%	49%	4%
Trafalgar Group (R)	October 10–13, 2024	1,088 (LV)	± 2.9%	46%	45%	9% (Note: "Other" with 4%)
Fabrizio, Lee & Associates (R)/McLaughlin & Associates (R)	October 6–9, 2024	800 (LV)	± 3.5%	47%	50%	3%
Emerson College	October 5–8, 2024	900 (LV)	± 3.2%	48%	47%	5% (Note: None of these candidates & "Someone else" with 1% each)
Emerson College	October 5–8, 2024	900 (LV)	± 3.2%	49%	48%	3% (Note: None of these candidates with 2%; "Someone else" with 1%)
The Wall Street Journal	September 28 – October 8, 2024	600 (RV)	± 5.0%	43%	49%	8%
RMG Research	September 30 – October 3, 2024	782 (LV)	± 3.5%	49%	47%	4% (Note: "Some other candidate" with 1%)
RMG Research	September 30 – October 3, 2024	782 (LV)	± 3.5%	49%	49%	2% (Note: "Would not vote" with 2%)
OnMessage Inc. (R)	September 24 – October 2, 2024	500 (LV)	± 4.4%	45%	47%	8%
InsiderAdvantage (R)	September 29–30, 2024	800 (LV)	± 3.0%	48%	49%	1%
Global Strategy Group (D)/North Star Opinion Research (R)	September 23–29, 2024	407 (LV)	± 4.9%	48%	47%	5%
TIPP Insights	September 23−25, 2024	1,044 (RV)	± 3.7%	48%	44%	8%
TIPP Insights	September 23−25, 2024	736 (LV)	± 3.7%	49%	48%	3%
Quantus Insights (R)	September 23−25, 2024	628 (LV)	± 4.0%	48%	49%	3% (Note: "Some other candidate" with 4%)
AtlasIntel	September 20–25, 2024	858 (LV)	± 3.0%	51%	48%	1%
Cook Political Report/BSG (R)/GS Strategy Group (D)	September 19–25, 2024	409 (LV)	–	48%	47%	5%
Bloomberg/Morning Consult	September 19–25, 2024	574 (RV)	± 4.0%	49%	45%	6%
Bloomberg/Morning Consult	September 19–25, 2024	516 (LV)	± 4.0%	52%	45%	3%
Rasmussen Reports (R)	September 19−22, 2024	738 (LV)	± 3.0%	48%	49%	3%
Remington Research Group (R)	September 16–20, 2024	800 (LV)	± 3.5%	48%	49%	3%
The Tarrance Group (R) (Note: Poll conducted for the Democracy Defense Project)	September 16–19, 2024	600 (LV)	± 4.1%	47%	44%	9% (Note: "None of the above" with 4%; "Others" with 1%)
Emerson College	September 15–18, 2024	895 (LV)	± 3.2%	48%	48%	4%
Emerson College	September 15–18, 2024	895 (LV)	± 3.2%	49%	49%	2%
Morning Consult	September 9−18, 2024	474 (LV)	± 5.0%	51%	47%	2%
Noble Predictive Insights	September 9−16, 2024	812 (RV)	± 3.4%	48%	45%	7%
Noble Predictive Insights	September 9−16, 2024	692 (LV)	± 3.7%	48%	47%	5%
Trafalgar Group (R)	September 11–13, 2024	1,079 (LV)	± 2.9%	45%	44%	11% (Note: "Other" with 8%)
Morning Consult	August 30 – September 8, 2024	516 (LV)	± 4.0%	48%	48%	4%
Patriot Polling	September 1–3, 2024	788 (RV)	–	47%	47%	6%
InsiderAdvantage (R)	August 29–31, 2024	800 (LV)	± 3.5%	47%	48%	5% (Note: "Another candidate" with 2%)
Emerson College	August 25–28, 2024	1,168 (LV)	± 2.8%	49%	48%	3% (Note: "Someone else" with 1%)
Emerson College	August 25–28, 2024	1,168 (LV)	± 2.8%	49%	49%	1% (Note: "Someone else" with 1%; None of these candidates with 1%)
Bloomberg/Morning Consult	August 23–26, 2024	416 (LV)	± 5.0%	50%	46%	4%
Bloomberg/Morning Consult	August 23–26, 2024	450 (RV)	± 5.0%	49%	45%	6%
Fox News	August 23–26, 2024	1,026 (RV)	± 3.0%	50%	48%	2%
	August 23, 2024	Robert F. Kennedy Jr. suspends his presidential campaign and endorses Donald Trump.				
	August 19–22, 2024	Democratic National Convention				
Rasmussen Reports (R)	August 13–18, 2024	980 (LV)	± 3.0%	46%	48%	6%
Focaldata	August 6–16, 2024	678 (LV)	± 3.8%	54%	46%	–
The New York Times/Siena College	August 12–15, 2024	677 (RV)	± 4.4%	46%	48%	6%
The New York Times/Siena College	August 12–15, 2024	677 (LV)	± 4.4%	47%	48%	5%
Cook Political Report/BSG (R)/GS Strategy Group (D)	July 26 – August 8, 2024	403 (LV)	–	45%	48%	7%
	August 6, 2024	Kamala Harris selects Gov. Tim Walz as her running mate.				
Public Opinion Strategies (R)	July 23–29, 2024	400 (LV)	± 4.9%	45%	46%	9%
Bloomberg/Morning Consult	July 24–28, 2024	454 (RV)	± 5.0%	47%	45%	7%
	July 21, 2024	Joe Biden announces his withdrawal; Kamala Harris declares her candidacy for president.				
	July 18, 2024	Republican National Convention concludes				
InsiderAdvantage (R)	July 15–16, 2024	800 (LV)	± 3.5%	40%	50%	10%
	July 15, 2024	Republican National Convention begins				
	July 13, 2024	attempted assassination of Donald Trump				
Bloomberg/Morning Consult	May 7–13, 2024	459 (RV)	± 5.0%	44%	47%	9%
Emerson College	February 16–19, 2024	1,000 (RV)	± 3.0%	39%	48%	13%
The New York Times/Siena College	October 22 – November 3, 2023	611 (RV)	± 4.4%	42%	48%	10%
The New York Times/Siena College	October 22 – November 3, 2023	611 (LV)	± 4.4%	42%	50%	8%

Kamala Harris vs. Donald Trump vs. Cornel West vs. Jill Stein vs. Chase Oliver

Aggregate polls

Source of poll aggregation	Dates administered	Dates updated	Kamala Harris Democratic	Donald Trump Republican	Jill Stein (Note: Not on the ballot.) Green	Cornel West Independent	Chase Oliver Libertarian	Other/ Undecided	Margin
Race to the WH	through November 2, 2024	November 3, 2024	47.9%	47.3%	—N/a	—N/a	1.2%	3.6%	Harris +0.6%
270toWin	October 22 – November 3, 2024	November 3, 2024	47.8%	47.4%	0.0%	0.0%	1.0%	3.8%	Harris +0.4%
Average			47.9%	47.4%	0.0%	0.0%	1.1%	3.7%	Harris +0.5%

Poll source	Date(s) administered	Sample size	Margin of error	Kamala Harris Democratic	Donald Trump Republican	Cornel West Independent	Jill Stein Green	Chase Oliver Libertarian	Other / Undecided
HarrisX	November 3–5, 2024	1,260 (RV)	± 2.8%	46%	45%	2%	1%	–	6%
HarrisX	November 3–5, 2024	1,260 (RV)	± 2.8%	50%	46%	3%	1%	–	–
HarrisX	November 3–5, 2024	1,125 (LV)	± 2.8%	48%	47%	2%	1%	–	2%
HarrisX	November 3–5, 2024	1,125 (LV)	± 2.8%	49%	48%	2%	1%	–	–
The New York Times/Siena College	October 24 – November 2, 2024	1,010 (RV)	± 3.5%	47%	44%	–	–	3%	6%
The New York Times/Siena College	October 24 – November 2, 2024	1,010 (LV)	± 3.5%	48%	46%	–	–	2%	4%
Focaldata	October 3 – November 1, 2024	1,324 (LV)	–	48%	47%	–	0%	1%	4%
Focaldata	October 3 – November 1, 2024	1,197 (RV)	± 2.7%	49%	45%	–	0%	2%	4%
Focaldata	October 3 – November 1, 2024	1,324 (A)	–	48%	44%	–	0%	2%	1%
Noble Predictive Insights	October 28–31, 2024	593 (LV)	± 4.0%	49%	48%	–	–	0%	3% (Note: Joel Skousen (C) with 0%)
Redfield & Wilton Strategies	October 28–31, 2024	690 (LV)	–	47%	48%	–	0%	1%	4%
YouGov	October 25–31, 2024	790 (RV)	± 4.6%	48%	47%	0%	0%	–	5%
YouGov	October 25–31, 2024	773 (LV)	± 4.6%	48%	47%	0%	0%	–	5%
Data for Progress (D)	October 25–30, 2024	721 (LV)	± 4.0%	49%	47%	–	–	1%	3%
Redfield & Wilton Strategies	October 25–27, 2024	531 (LV)	–	47%	47%	–	–	1%	6%
CNN/SSRS	October 21–26, 2024	683 (LV)	± 4.6%	47%	48%	–	–	1%	4%
Redfield & Wilton Strategies	October 20–22, 2024	540 (LV)	–	46%	47%	–	0%	0%	7%
OnMessage Inc. (R) (Note: Poll sponsored by the Senate Opportunity Fund)	October 19–22, 2024	600 (LV)	± 4.0%	47%	50%	–	–	0%	3%
Bloomberg/Morning Consult	October 16–20, 2024	449 (RV)	± 5.0%	48%	47%	–	0%	2%	3%
Bloomberg/Morning Consult	October 16–20, 2024	420 (LV)	± 5.0%	48%	48%	–	0%	1%	3%
Redfield & Wilton Strategies	October 16–18, 2024	529 (LV)	–	46%	47%	–	1%	1%	5%
AtlasIntel	October 12–17, 2024	1,171 (LV)	± 3.0%	48%	48%	–	2%	0%	2%
Fabrizio Ward (R)/Impact Research (D)	October 8−15, 2024	600 (LV)	± 4.0%	46%	47%	–	–	1%	6%
Redfield & Wilton Strategies	October 12–14, 2024	838 (LV)	–	47%	47%	–	0%	1%	5%
Redfield & Wilton Strategies	September 27 – October 2, 2024	514 (LV)	–	48%	47%	–	1%	1%	3%
TIPP Insights	September 23−25, 2024	1,044 (RV)	± 3.7%	48%	43%	1%	0%	−	9%
TIPP Insights	September 23−25, 2024	736 (LV)	± 3.7%	50%	49%	0%	0%	−	1%
AtlasIntel	September 20–25, 2024	858 (LV)	± 3.0%	51%	48%	–	1%	–	–
Bloomberg/Morning Consult	September 19–25, 2024	574 (RV)	± 4.0%	46%	44%	–	3%	4%	3%
Bloomberg/Morning Consult	September 19–25, 2024	516 (LV)	± 4.0%	50%	44%	–	2%	2%	2%
Redfield & Wilton Strategies	September 16–19, 2024	652 (LV)	–	45%	45%	–	0%	1%	9%
Noble Predictive Insights	September 9−16, 2024	812 (RV)	± 3.4%	46%	43%	–	0%	1%	10% (Note: None of these candidates with 3%)
Noble Predictive Insights	September 9−16, 2024	692 (LV)	± 3.7%	47%	47%	–	0%	1%	5% (Note: None of these candidates with 1%)
Redfield & Wilton Strategies	September 6–9, 2024	698 (LV)	–	45%	46%	–	1%	1%	7%
YouGov	August 23 – September 3, 2024	800 (RV)	± 4.7%	49%	46%	0%	1%	–	4%
CNN/SSRS	August 23–29, 2024	976 (LV)	± 4.4%	48%	47%	–	1%	1%	3%
Redfield & Wilton Strategies	August 25–28, 2024	490 (LV)	–	47%	47%	–	1%	0%	5%
Bloomberg/Morning Consult	August 23–26, 2024	416 (LV)	± 5.0%	48%	46%	–	2%	3%	1%
Bloomberg/Morning Consult	August 23–26, 2024	450 (RV)	± 5.0%	48%	45%	–	2%	4%	1%
Fox News	August 23–26, 2024	1,026 (RV)	± 3.0%	48%	46%	2%	1%	1%	2%

== New Hampshire ==
Kamala Harris vs. Donald Trump

Aggregate polls

Source of poll aggregation	Dates administered	Dates updated	Kamala Harris Democratic	Donald Trump Republican	Undecided (Note: Calculated by taking the difference of 100% and all other candidates combined.)	Margin
270ToWin	October 24 – November 3, 2024	November 3, 2024	50.5%	45.5%	4.0%	Harris +5.0%
538	through November 4, 2024	November 4, 2024	50.3%	45.4%	4.3%	Harris +4.9%
Silver Bulletin	through November 4, 2024	November 4, 2024	50.9%	46.3%	2.8%	Harris +4.6%
The Hill/DDHQ	through November 4, 2024	November 4, 2024	53.3%	42.5%	4.2%	Harris +10.8%
Average			51.3%	44.9%	3.8%	Harris +6.4%

Poll source	Date(s) administered	Sample size	Margin of error	Kamala Harris Democratic	Donald Trump Republican	Other / Undecided
Dartmouth College	November 1–3, 2024	587 (LV)	± 4.0%	62%	34%	4%
Rasmussen Reports (R)	October 24–28, 2024	901 (LV)	± 3.0%	48%	47%	5%
Praecones Analytica/NHJournal	October 24–26, 2024	622 (RV)	–	50%	50%	–
CES/YouGov	October 1–25, 2024	380 (A)	–	52%	45%	3%
CES/YouGov	October 1–25, 2024	375 (LV)	–	52%	45%	3%
Emerson College	October 21–23, 2024	915 (LV)	± 3.2%	50%	47%	3%
Emerson College	October 21–23, 2024	915 (LV)	± 3.2%	51%	47%	2%
Dartmouth College	October 5–18, 2024	2,211 (RV)	± 2.1%	59%	38%	3%
	August 23, 2024	Robert F. Kennedy Jr. suspends his presidential campaign and endorses Donald Trump.				
	August 22, 2024	Democratic National Convention concludes				
University of New Hampshire	August 15–19, 2024	2,048 (LV)	± 2.2%	52%	47%	1%
	August 19, 2024	Democratic National Convention begins				
	August 6, 2024	Kamala Harris selects Gov. Tim Walz as her running mate.				
Emerson College	July 26–28, 2024	1,000 (RV)	± 3.0%	50%	46%	4%
Emerson College	July 26–28, 2024	1,000 (RV)	± 3.0%	52%	48%	–
University of New Hampshire	July 23–25, 2024	2,875 (LV)	± 1.8%	53%	46%	1%
	July 21, 2024	Joe Biden announces his official withdrawal from the race; Kamala Harris declares her candidacy for president.				
	July 15–19, 2024	Republican National Convention				
	July 13, 2024	attempted assassination of Donald Trump				
Trafalgar Group (R)	December 10–12, 2021	1,041 (LV)	± 3.0%	46%	48%	6%

Kamala Harris vs. Donald Trump vs. Cornel West vs. Jill Stein vs. Chase Oliver

Poll source	Date(s) administered	Sample size	Margin of error	Kamala Harris Democratic	Donald Trump Republican	Cornel West Independent	Jill Stein Green	Chase Oliver Libertarian	Other / Undecided
University of New Hampshire	October 29 – November 2, 2024	2,814 (LV)	± 1.9%	51%	46%	–	0%	1%	2%
Saint Anselm College	October 28–29, 2024	2,791 (LV)	± 2.6%	51%	46%	0%	0%	1%	2%
University of Massachusetts Lowell/YouGov	October 10–23, 2024	600 (LV)	± 4.4%	50%	43%	–	1%	1%	5%
University of Massachusetts Lowell/YouGov	October 2–10, 2024	600 (LV)	± 4.8%	50%	41%	–	1%	1%	7%
Saint Anselm College	October 1–2, 2024	2,104 (LV)	± 2.1%	51%	44%	0%	1%	1%	3%
University of New Hampshire	September 12–16, 2024	1,695 (LV)	± 2.4%	54%	43%	–	0%	1%	2%
Saint Anselm College	September 11–12, 2024	2,241 (LV)	± 2.1%	51%	43%	0%	1%	1%	4%

== New Jersey ==
Kamala Harris vs. Donald Trump

Poll source	Date(s) administered	Sample size	Margin of error	Kamala Harris Democratic	Donald Trump Republican	Other / Undecided
Research Co.	November 2–3, 2024	450 (LV)	± 4.6%	57%	40%	3%
Rutgers-Eagleton	October 15–22, 2024	451 (RV)	–	55%	35%	10% (Note: "Neither/Someone else" with 6%)
Rutgers-Eagleton	October 15–22, 2024	478 (RV)	–	51% (Note: With each candidate's party affiliation excluded)	37%	12% (Note: "Neither/Someone else" with 7%)
ActiVote	October 2–28, 2024	400 (LV)	± 4.9%	57%	43%	–
Cygnal (R)	October 23–24, 2024	600 (LV)	± 4.0%	52%	40%	8% (Note: "A third-party candidate" with 4%)
ActiVote	September 4 – October 2, 2024	400 (LV)	± 4.9%	56%	44%	–

== New Mexico ==
Kamala Harris vs. Donald Trump

Poll source	Date(s) administered	Sample size	Margin of error	Kamala Harris Democratic	Donald Trump Republican	Other / Undecided
Victory Insights	November 1–3, 2024	600 (LV)	–	49.6%	44.7%	5.7% (Note: "Other" with 5.7%)
SurveyUSA (Note: Poll sponsored by KOB-TV)	October 28–31, 2024	632 (LV)	± 5.5%	50%	44%	6%
Rasmussen Reports (R)	October 24–26, 2024	749 (LV)	± 3.0%	49%	44%	7%
Rasmussen Reports (R)	September 19−22, 2024	708 (LV)	± 3.0%	50%	44%	6%
SurveyUSA	September 12–18, 2024	619 (LV)	± 5.4%	50%	42%	8%
	September 10, 2024	The presidential debate between Harris and Trump hosted by ABC				
	August 23, 2024	Robert F. Kennedy Jr. suspends his presidential campaign and endorses Donald Trump.				
	August 22, 2024	Democratic National Convention concludes				
Emerson College	August 20–22, 2024	956 (RV)	± 3.1%	52%	42%	6%
Emerson College	August 20–22, 2024	956 (RV)	± 3.1%	54%	46%	–
	August 19, 2024	Democratic National Convention begins				

Kamala Harris vs. Donald Trump vs. Cornel West vs. Jill Stein vs. Chase Oliver

Poll source	Date(s) administered	Sample size	Margin of error	Kamala Harris Democratic	Donald Trump Republican	Cornel West Independent	Jill Stein Green	Chase Oliver Libertarian	Other / Undecided
Redfield & Wilton Strategies	October 12–14, 2024	382 (LV)	–	49%	45%	–	2%	1%	3%
Redfield & Wilton Strategies	September 6–9, 2024	521 (LV)	–	49%	44%	–	1%	1%	5%

Kamala Harris vs. Donald Trump vs. Robert F. Kennedy Jr. vs. Cornel West vs. Jill Stein vs. Chase Oliver

Poll source	Date(s) administered	Sample size	Margin of error	Kamala Harris Democratic	Donald Trump Republican	Robert F. Kennedy Jr. Independent	Cornel West Independent	Jill Stein Green	Chase Oliver Libertarian	Other / Undecided
Emerson College	August 20–22, 2024	956 (RV)	± 3.1%	51%	40%	3%	0%	0%	0%	6%
Redfield & Wilton Strategies	August 12–15, 2024	592 (LV)	–	47%	41%	6%	–	0%	0%	6%
Redfield & Wilton Strategies	July 31 – August 3, 2024	493 (LV)	–	44%	37%	8%	–	0%	0%	11%

Kamala Harris vs. Donald Trump vs. Robert F. Kennedy Jr.

Poll source	Date(s) administered	Sample size	Margin of error	Kamala Harris Democratic	Donald Trump Republican	Robert F. Kennedy Jr. Independent	Other / Undecided
Research & Polling Inc. (Note: Poll conducted for the Albuquerque Journal)	October 10–18, 2024	1,024 (LV)	± 3.1%	50%	41%	3%	6%
Research & Polling Inc.	September 6–13, 2024	532 (LV)	± 4.2%	49%	39%	3%	9%

== New York ==
Kamala Harris vs. Donald Trump

Poll source	Date(s) administered	Sample size	Margin of error	Kamala Harris Democratic	Donald Trump Republican	Other / Undecided
Research Co.	November 2–3, 2024	450 (LV)	± 4.6%	57%	41%	2%
ActiVote	October 7–27, 2024	400 (LV)	± 4.9%	59%	41%	–
Siena College	October 13–17, 2024	872 (LV)	± 4.1%	58%	39%	3%
ActiVote	September 4–30, 2024	400 (LV)	± 4.9%	61%	39%	–
Emerson College (Note: Poll sponsored by WPIX-TV)	September 23–25, 2024	1,000 (RV)	± 3.0%	54%	40%	6% (Note: "Someone else" with 3%)
Siena College	September 11–16, 2024	1,003 (LV)	± 4.3%	55%	42%	3%
	August 23, 2024	Robert F. Kennedy Jr. suspends his presidential campaign and endorses Donald Trump.				
	August 22, 2024	Democratic National Convention concludes				
ActiVote	August 1–21, 2024	400 (LV)	± 4.9%	58%	42%	–
	August 19, 2024	Democratic National Convention begins				
	August 6, 2024	Kamala Harris selects Gov. Tim Walz as her running mate.				
Siena College	July 28 – August 1, 2024	1,199 (LV)	± 4.0%	53%	39%	8%
	July 21, 2024	Joe Biden announces his official withdrawal from the race; Kamala Harris declares her candidacy for president.				
SoCal Strategies (R)	July 18–19, 2024	500 (LV)	± 4.4%	52%	41%	7%

Kamala Harris vs. Donald Trump vs. Cornel West vs. Jill Stein vs. Chase Oliver

Poll source	Date(s) administered	Sample size	Margin of error	Kamala Harris Democratic	Donald Trump Republican	Cornel West Independent	Jill Stein Green	Chase Oliver Libertarian	Other / Undecided
Siena College	September 11–16, 2024	1,003 (LV)	± 4.3%	52%	40%	1%	2%	0%	5%

== North Carolina ==
Donald Trump vs. Kamala Harris

Aggregate polls

Source of poll aggregation	Dates administered	Dates updated	Kamala Harris Democratic	Donald Trump Republican	Other / Undecided (Note: Calculated by taking the difference of 100% and all other candidates combined.)	Margin
270ToWin	October 23 – November 4, 2024	November 5, 2024	47.3%	48.6%	4.1%	Trump +1.3%
538	through November 4, 2024	November 5, 2024	47.4%	48.3%	4.3%	Trump +0.9%
Silver Bulletin	through November 4, 2024	November 5, 2024	47.7%	48.8%	3.5%	Trump +1.1%
The Hill/DDHQ	through November 4, 2024	November 5, 2024	47.9%	49.4%	2.7%	Trump +1.5%
Average			47.6%	48.8%	3.6%	Trump +1.2%

Poll source	Date(s) administered	Sample size	Margin of error	Donald Trump Republican	Kamala Harris Democratic	Other / Undecided
HarrisX	November 3–5, 2024	1,815 (RV)	± 2.3%	48%	47%	5%
HarrisX	November 3–5, 2024	1,815 (RV)	± 2.3%	50.5%	49.5%	–
HarrisX	November 3–5, 2024	1,600 (LV)	± 2.3%	49%	48%	3%
HarrisX	November 3–5, 2024	1,600 (LV)	± 2.3%	50.2%	49.8%	–
AtlasIntel	November 3–4, 2024	1,219 (LV)	± 3.0%	50%	48%	2%
Patriot Polling	November 1–3, 2024	799 (RV)	± 3.0%	51%	49%	–
InsiderAdvantage (R)	November 1–2, 2024	800 (LV)	± 3.4%	49%	47%	4%
AtlasIntel	November 1–2, 2024	1,310 (LV)	± 3.0%	51%	47%	2%
Emerson College	October 30 – November 2, 2024	860 (LV)	± 3.3%	49%	48%	3%
Emerson College	October 30 – November 2, 2024	860 (LV)	± 3.3%	50%	49%	1%
The New York Times/Siena College	October 28 – November 2, 2024	1,010 (RV)	± 3.5%	44%	48%	8%
The New York Times/Siena College	October 28 – November 2, 2024	1,010 (LV)	± 3.5%	46%	48%	6%
ActiVote	October 17 – November 2, 2024	400 (LV)	± 4.9%	51%	49%	–
Morning Consult	October 23 − November 1, 2024	1,056 (LV)	± 3.0%	49%	47%	4%
AtlasIntel	October 30–31, 2024	1,373 (LV)	± 3.0%	51%	47%	2%
YouGov	October 25–31, 2024	987 (RV)	± 4.2%	49%	49%	2%
YouGov	October 25–31, 2024	949 (LV)	± 4.2%	50%	49%	1%
Rasmussen Reports (R)	October 25–30, 2024	751 (LV)	± 3.0%	50%	47%	3%
AtlasIntel	October 25–29, 2024	1,665 (LV)	± 3.0%	48%	49%	3%
Trafalgar Group (R)	October 25–28, 2024	1,091 (LV)	± 2.9%	49%	46%	5%
Fox News	October 24–28, 2024	1,113 (RV)	± 3.0%	49%	50%	1%
Fox News	October 24–28, 2024	872 (LV)	± 3.0%	50%	49%	1%
SurveyUSA (Note: Poll sponsored by WRAL-TV)	October 23–26, 2024	853 (LV)	± 4.1%	47%	47%	6%
CES/YouGov	October 1–25, 2024	2,330 (A)	–	48%	49%	3%
CES/YouGov	October 1–25, 2024	2,308 (LV)	–	50%	48%	2%
Emerson College	October 21–22, 2024	950 (LV)	± 3.1%	50%	48%	2%
Emerson College	October 21–22, 2024	950 (LV)	± 3.1%	50%	48%	2%
Marist College	October 17–22, 2024	1,410 (RV)	± 3.3%	49%	48%	3% (Note: "Another party's candidates" with 2%)
Marist College	October 17–22, 2024	1,226 (LV)	± 3.6%	50%	48%	2% (Note: "Another party's candidates" with 1%)
SoCal Strategies (R)	October 20–21, 2024	702 (LV)	± 3.7%	49%	46%	5%
InsiderAdvantage (R)	October 19–20, 2024	800 (LV)	± 3.5%	49%	47%	4%
High Point University/SurveyUSA	October 17–20, 2024	1,164 (RV)	± 3.5%	46%	47%	7%
Bloomberg/Morning Consult	October 16–20, 2024	755 (RV)	± 4.0%	50%	47%	3%
Bloomberg/Morning Consult	October 16–20, 2024	702 (LV)	± 4.0%	50%	48%	2%
AtlasIntel	October 12–17, 2024	1,674 (LV)	± 2.0%	49%	51%	–
Elon University	October 10–17, 2024	800 (RV)	± 4.0%	46%	46%	8% (Note: "Another candidate" with 4%)
Morning Consult	October 6−15, 2024	1,072 (LV)	± 3.0%	49%	48%	3%
The Washington Post/Schar School	September 30 – October 15, 2024	965 (RV)	± 3.9%	49%	45%	6%
The Washington Post/Schar School	September 30 – October 15, 2024	965 (LV)	± 3.9%	50%	47%	3%
Quinnipiac University	October 10–14, 2024	1,031 (LV)	± 3.1%	47%	50%	3%
Rasmussen Reports (R)	October 9–14, 2024	1,042 (LV)	± 3.0%	51%	46%	3%
Trafalgar Group (R)	October 10–13, 2024	1,085 (LV)	± 2.9%	47%	45%	6%
Fabrizio, Lee & Associates (R)/McLaughlin & Associates (R)	October 6–9, 2024	800 (LV)	± 3.5%	48%	47%	5%
Emerson College	October 5–8, 2024	1,000 (LV)	± 3.0%	49%	48%	3%
Emerson College	October 5–8, 2024	1,000 (LV)	± 3.0%	50%	49%	1%
The Wall Street Journal	September 28 – October 8, 2024	600 (RV)	± 5.0%	47%	47%	6%
ActiVote	September 7 – October 6, 2024	400 (LV)	± 4.9%	49%	51%	–
InsiderAdvantage (R)	September 29–30, 2024	800 (LV)	± 3.5%	50%	49%	1%
Quinnipiac University	September 25–29, 2024	953 (LV)	± 3.2%	49%	48%	3%
The Washington Post	September 25–29, 2024	1,001 (RV)	± 3.5%	50%	47%	3%
The Washington Post	September 25–29, 2024	1,001 (LV)	± 3.5%	50%	48%	2%
Global Strategy Group (D)/North Star Opinion Research (R)	September 23–29, 2024	401 (LV)	± 4.9%	48%	47%	5%
High Point University	September 20–29, 2024	814 (RV)	± 3.6%	46%	48%	6%
High Point University	September 20–29, 2024	589 (LV)	± 4.9%	48%	48%	4%
Emerson College (Note: Poll sponsored by RealClearWorld)	September 27–28, 2024	850 (LV)	± 3.3%	49%	48%	3%
Emerson College	September 27–28, 2024	850 (LV)	± 3.3%	50%	49%	1%
RMG Research	September 25–27, 2024	780 (LV)	± 3.5%	49%	46%	5% (Note: "Some other candidate" with 2%)
RMG Research	September 25–27, 2024	780 (LV)	± 3.5%	51%	47%	2% (Note: "Some other candidate" with 1%)
AtlasIntel	September 20–25, 2024	1,173 (LV)	± 3.0%	48%	51%	1%
Cook Political Report/BSG (R)/GS Strategy Group (D)	September 19–25, 2024	411 (LV)	–	49%	49%	2%
Bloomberg/Morning Consult	September 19–25, 2024	889 (RV)	± 3.0%	47%	50%	3%
Bloomberg/Morning Consult	September 19–25, 2024	828 (LV)	± 3.0%	48%	50%	2%
Fox News	September 20−24, 2024	991 (RV)	± 3.0%	48%	50%	2%
Fox News	September 20−24, 2024	787 (LV)	± 3.5%	50%	49%	1%
Marist College	September 19−24, 2024	1,507 (RV)	± 3.5%	48%	49%	3%
Marist College	September 19−24, 2024	1,348 (LV)	± 3.7%	49%	49%	2%
The Bullfinch Group	September 20–23, 2024	600 (RV)	± 4.0%	48%	49%	3%
Rasmussen Reports (R)	September 19−22, 2024	1,078 (LV)	± 3.0%	49%	46%	5%
The New York Times/Siena College	September 17–21, 2024	682 (RV)	± 4.2%	48%	47%	5%
The New York Times/Siena College	September 17–21, 2024	682 (LV)	± 4.2%	49%	47%	4%
Meredith College	September 18−20, 2024	802 (LV)	± 3.5%	48%	48%	4% (Note: "Third party candidates" & "Undecided" with 2%)
Victory Insights	September 16−18, 2024	600 (LV)	± 4.0%	49%	45%	6%
Emerson College	September 15–18, 2024	1,000 (LV)	± 3.0%	48%	49%	3%
Emerson College	September 15–18, 2024	1,000 (LV)	± 3.0%	49%	50%	1%
Morning Consult	September 9−18, 2024	1,314 (LV)	± 3.0%	47%	49%	4%
Fabrizio Ward (R)/Impact Research (D)	September 11–17, 2024	600 (LV)	± 4.0%	50%	47%	3%
TIPP Insights	September 11–13, 2024	973 (LV)	± 3.2%	49%	46%	5%
Elon University	September 4−13, 2024	800 (RV)	± 3.8%	45%	46%	9% (Note: "Another candidate" with 3%)
Trafalgar Group (R)	September 11–12, 2024	1,094 (LV)	± 2.9%	48%	46%	6%
Quantus Insights (R)	September 11–12, 2024	815 (LV)	± 3.4%	48%	47%	5% (Note: "Some other candidate" with 3%)
Quantus Insights (R)	September 11–12, 2024	815 (LV)	± 3.4%	50%	48%	2% (Note: "Would not vote" with 2%)
Quinnipiac University	September 4–8, 2024	940 (LV)	± 3.2%	47%	50%	3%
Morning Consult	August 30 – September 8, 2024	1,369 (LV)	± 3.0%	48%	48%	4%
SurveyUSA	September 4–7, 2024	900 (LV)	± 4.9%	46%	49%	5%
Mainstreet Research/Florida Atlantic University	September 5–6, 2024	692 (RV)	± 3.7%	47%	46%	7%
Mainstreet Research/Florida Atlantic University	September 5–6, 2024	619 (LV)	± 3.7%	48%	47%	5%
Patriot Polling	September 1–3, 2024	804 (RV)	–	50%	48%	2%
InsiderAdvantage (R)	August 29–31, 2024	800 (LV)	± 3.5%	49%	48%	3%
ActiVote	August 6–31, 2024	400 (LV)	± 4.9%	50%	50%	–
Emerson College	August 25–28, 2024	775 (LV)	± 3.5%	49%	48%	3%
Emerson College	August 25–28, 2024	775 (LV)	± 3.5%	50%	49%	1%
SoCal Strategies (R)	August 26–27, 2024	612 (LV)	–	50%	46%	4%
Bloomberg/Morning Consult	August 23–26, 2024	645 (LV)	± 4.0%	49%	49%	2%
Bloomberg/Morning Consult	August 23–26, 2024	700 (RV)	± 4.0%	47%	49%	4%
Fox News	August 23–26, 2024	999 (RV)	± 3.0%	50%	49%	1%
	August 23, 2024	Robert F. Kennedy Jr. suspends his presidential campaign and endorses Donald Trump.				
	August 22, 2024	Democratic National Convention concludes				
High Point University/SurveyUSA	August 19–21, 2024	1,053 (RV)	± 4.0%	45%	46%	9%
High Point University/SurveyUSA	August 19–21, 2024	941 (LV)	± 4.0%	47%	47%	6%
Spry Strategies (R)	August 14–20, 2024	600 (LV)	± 4.0%	47%	47%	6%
	August 19, 2024	Democratic National Convention begins				
Focaldata	August 6–16, 2024	702 (LV)	± 3.7%	50%	50%	–
The New York Times/Siena College	August 9–14, 2024	655 (RV)	± 4.2%	46%	49%	5%
The New York Times/Siena College	August 9–14, 2024	655 (LV)	± 4.2%	47%	49%	4%
Trafalgar Group (R)	August 6–8, 2024	1,082 (LV)	± 2.9%	49%	45%	6%
Navigator Research (D)	July 31 – August 8, 2024	600 (LV)	± 4.0%	48%	46%	6%
Cook Political Report/BSG (R)/GS Strategy Group (D)	July 26 – August 8, 2024	403 (LV)	–	47%	48%	5%
	August 6, 2024	Kamala Harris selects Gov. Tim Walz as her running mate.				
Bloomberg/Morning Consult	July 24–28, 2024	706 (RV)	± 4.0%	48%	46%	6%
	July 21, 2024	Joe Biden announces his official withdrawal from the race; Kamala Harris declares her candidacy for president.				
	July 15–19, 2024	Republican National Convention				
	July 13, 2024	Attempted assassination of Donald Trump				
Bloomberg/Morning Consult	May 7–13, 2024	704 (RV)	± 4.0%	50%	40%	10%
Emerson College	February 14–16, 2024	1,000 (RV)	± 3.0%	50%	41%	9%

Donald Trump vs. Kamala Harris vs. Cornel West vs. Jill Stein vs. Chase Oliver

Aggregate polls

Source of poll aggregation	Dates administered	Dates updated	Kamala Harris Democratic	Donald Trump Republican	Jill Stein Green	Cornel West Independent	Chase Oliver Libertarian	Others/ Undecided	Margin
Race to the WH	through October 2, 2024	October 15, 2024	47.1%	47.8%	1.0%	0.8%	—N/a	3.3%	Trump +0.8%
270toWin	October 1 – 11, 2024	October 11, 2024	46.6%	47.0%	0.8%	1.0%	0.5%	4.1%	Trump +0.4%
Average			47.0%	47.5%	0.8%	0.8%	0.6%	3.3%	Trump +0.5%

Poll source	Date(s) administered	Sample size	Margin of error	Donald Trump Republican	Kamala Harris Democratic	Cornel West Independent	Jill Stein Green	Chase Oliver Libertarian	Other / Undecided
HarrisX	November 3–5, 2024	1,815 (RV)	± 2.3%	48%	46%	1%	1%	–	4%
HarrisX	November 3–5, 2024	1,815 (RV)	± 2.3%	49.0%	48.5%	1.6%	0.9%	–	–
HarrisX	November 3–5, 2024	1,600 (LV)	± 2.3%	49%	48%	1%	0%	–	2%
HarrisX	November 3–5, 2024	1,600 (LV)	± 2.3%	49.2%	49.0%	1.2%	0.6%	–	–
AtlasIntel	November 3–4, 2024	1,219 (LV)	± 3.0%	50%	48%	–	1%	0%	1%
AtlasIntel	November 1–2, 2024	1,310 (LV)	± 3.0%	50%	47%	–	1%	0%	2%
The New York Times/Siena College	October 28 – November 2, 2024	1,010 (RV)	± 3.5%	43%	47%	0%	0%	1%	9%
The New York Times/Siena College	October 28 – November 2, 2024	1,010 (LV)	± 3.5%	45%	48%	0%	0%	0%	7%
Focaldata	October 3 – November 1, 2024	1,787 (LV)	–	48%	48%	–	1%	1%	2%
Focaldata	October 3 – November 1, 2024	1,785 (RV)	± 2.2%	46%	50%	–	1%	1%	2%
Focaldata	October 3 – November 1, 2024	1,987 (A)	–	46%	48%	–	2%	1%	4%
AtlasIntel	October 30–31, 2024	1,373 (LV)	± 3.0%	51%	47%	–	1%	0%	1%
Redfield & Wilton Strategies	October 28–31, 2024	1,123 (LV)	–	48%	47%	–	1%	1%	3%
YouGov	October 25–31, 2024	987 (RV)	± 4.2%	48%	47%	0%	1%	–	4%
YouGov	October 25–31, 2024	949 (LV)	± 4.2%	49%	48%	0%	1%	–	2%
AtlasIntel	October 25–29, 2024	1,665 (LV)	± 3.0%	48%	48%	–	1%	0%	3%
East Carolina University	October 24–29, 2024	1,250 (LV)	± 3.0%	50%	48%	0%	0%	0%	2%
CNN/SSRS	October 23–28, 2024	750 (LV)	± 4.5%	47%	48%	1%	1%	1%	2%
Redfield & Wilton Strategies	October 25–27, 2024	770 (LV)	–	48%	46%	–	1%	1%	4%
University of Massachusetts Lowell/YouGov	October 16–23, 2024	650 (LV)	± 4.2%	47%	45%	1%	1%	0%	6%
Redfield & Wilton Strategies	October 20–22, 2024	679 (LV)	–	48%	47%	–	1%	0%	4%
Bloomberg/Morning Consult	October 16–20, 2024	755 (RV)	± 4.0%	49%	46%	–	1%	3%	1%
Bloomberg/Morning Consult	October 16–20, 2024	702 (LV)	± 4.0%	49%	48%	–	1%	1%	1%
Redfield & Wilton Strategies	October 16–18, 2024	843 (LV)	–	48%	45%	–	1%	0%	6%
AtlasIntel	October 12–17, 2024	1,674 (LV)	± 2.0%	49%	50%	0%	1%	0%	–
Cygnal (R) (Note: Poll sponsored by The Carolina Journal)	October 6–15, 2024	600 (LV)	± 4.0%	47%	47%	1%	0%	1%	4%
Redfield & Wilton Strategies	October 12–14, 2024	620 (LV)	–	48%	46%	–	0%	1%	5%
Quinnipiac University	October 10–14, 2024	1,031 (LV)	± 3.1%	47%	49%	0%	0%	1%	3%
Redfield & Wilton Strategies	September 27 – October 2, 2024	753 (LV)	–	47%	45%	–	1%	0%	7%
Quinnipiac University	September 25–29, 2024	953 (LV)	± 3.2%	49%	47%	1%	1%	0%	2%
East Carolina University	September 23–26, 2024	1,005 (LV)	± 3.0%	49%	47%	0%	0%	1%	3%
AtlasIntel	September 20–25, 2024	1,173 (LV)	± 3.0%	47%	51%	1%	1%	0%	–
CNN/SSRS	September 20–25, 2024	931 (LV)	± 3.9%	48%	48%	1%	0%	1%	2%
Cook Political Report/BSG (R)/GS Strategy Group (D)	September 19–25, 2024	411 (LV)	–	46%	49%	1%	2%	–	2%
Bloomberg/Morning Consult	September 19–25, 2024	889 (RV)	± 3.0%	46%	48%	–	1%	3%	2%
Bloomberg/Morning Consult	September 19–25, 2024	828 (LV)	± 3.0%	47%	49%	–	0%	2%	2%
Fox News	September 20−24, 2024	991 (RV)	± 3.0%	47%	48%	1%	1%	1%	2%
Fox News	September 20−24, 2024	787 (LV)	± 3.5%	49%	47%	1%	1%	1%	1%
The New York Times/Siena College	September 17–21, 2024	682 (RV)	± 4.2%	46%	46%	–	0%	1%	7%
The New York Times/Siena College	September 17–21, 2024	682 (LV)	± 4.2%	47%	45%	–	0%	1%	7%
Meredith College	September 18–20, 2024	802 (LV)	± 3.5%	48%	48%	0%	1%	1%	2%
Redfield & Wilton Strategies	September 16–19, 2024	868 (LV)	–	48%	47%	–	0%	0%	5%
Fabrizio Ward (R)/Impact Research (D)	September 11–17, 2024	600 (LV)	± 4.0%	48%	46%	1%	1%	1%	3%
Cygnal (R)	September 15–16, 2024	600 (LV)	± 4.0%	46%	45%	2%	0%	1%	6%
Redfield & Wilton Strategies	September 6–9, 2024	495 (LV)	–	44%	45%	–	0%	0%	11%
Quinnipiac University	September 4–8, 2024	940 (LV)	± 3.2%	46%	49%	0%	1%	0%	4%
YouGov	August 23 – September 3, 2024	1,000 (RV)	± 3.9%	47%	46%	0%	1%	–	6%
East Carolina University	August 26–28, 2024	920 (LV)	± 3.0%	48%	47%	0%	0%	1%	4%
Redfield & Wilton Strategies	August 25–28, 2024	1,071 (LV)	–	45%	44%	–	1%	1%	9%
Bloomberg/Morning Consult	August 23–26, 2024	700 (RV)	± 4.0%	47%	48%	–	1%	2%	2%
Bloomberg/Morning Consult	August 23–26, 2024	645 (LV)	± 4.0%	48%	48%	–	1%	2%	1%
Fox News	August 23–26, 2024	999 (RV)	± 3.0%	48%	47%	2%	1%	1%	1%

Donald Trump vs. Kamala Harris vs. Robert F. Kennedy Jr. vs. Cornel West vs. Jill Stein vs. Chase Oliver

Poll source	Date(s) administered	Sample size	Margin of error	Donald Trump Republican	Kamala Harris Democratic	Robert F. Kennedy Jr Independent	Cornel West Independent	Jill Stein Green	Chase Oliver Libertarian	Other / Undecided
Fox News	October 24–28, 2024	1,113 (RV)	± 3.0%	47%	48%	1%	1%	1%	1%	1%
Fox News	October 24–28, 2024	872 (LV)	± 3.0%	49%	47%	1%	1%	1%	1%	–
The Wall Street Journal	September 28 – October 8, 2024	600 (RV)	± 5.0%	46%	45%	0%	1%	1%	2%	5%
Global Strategy Group (D)/North Star Opinion Research (R)	September 23–29, 2024	401 (LV)	± 4.9%	47%	47%	0%	0%	0%	0%	6%
Spry Strategies (R)	August 14–20, 2024	600 (LV)	± 4.0%	45%	47%	3%	–	1%	–	4%
Focaldata	August 6–16, 2024	702 (LV)	± 3.7%	46%	47%	5%	–	1%	0%	1%
Focaldata	August 6–16, 2024	702 (RV)	± 3.7%	44%	47%	6%	–	1%	0%	2%
Focaldata	August 6–16, 2024	702 (A)	± 3.7%	43%	47%	7%	–	1%	0%	2%
Redfield & Wilton Strategies	August 12–15, 2024	601 (LV)	–	47%	44%	2%	–	0%	1%	6%
The New York Times/Siena College	August 9–14, 2024	655 (RV)	± 4.2%	42%	45%	5%	0%	2%	1%	4%
The New York Times/Siena College	August 9–14, 2024	655 (LV)	± 4.2%	44%	46%	4%	0%	1%	1%	4%
YouGov Blue (D) (Note: Poll sponsored by Carolina Forward)	August 5–9, 2024	802 (RV)	± 3.9%	46%	46%	2%	0%	0%	0%	5%
Navigator Research (D)	July 31 – August 8, 2024	600 (LV)	± 4.0%	46%	46%	3%	0%	1%	0%	4%
Cook Political Report/BSG (R)/GS Strategy Group (D)	July 26 – August 8, 2024	403 (LV)	–	44%	46%	4%	0%	1%	–	5%
Cygnal (R)	August 4–5, 2024	600 (LV)	± 4.0%	47%	44%	4%	–	0%	1%	4%
Redfield & Wilton Strategies	July 31 – August 3, 2024	714 (LV)	–	44%	41%	4%	–	0%	1%	10%
Bloomberg/Morning Consult	July 24–28, 2024	706 (RV)	± 4.0%	45%	44%	5%	–	0%	4%	2%
Redfield & Wilton Strategies	July 22–24, 2024	586 (LV)	–	46%	43%	4%	–	0%	0%	7%

Donald Trump vs. Kamala Harris vs. Robert F. Kennedy Jr. vs. Jill Stein

Poll source	Date(s) administered	Sample size	Margin of error	Donald Trump Republican	Kamala Harris Democratic	Robert F. Kennedy Jr. Independent	Jill Stein Green	Other / Undecided
Public Policy Polling (D)	July 17–20, 2024	573 (RV)	± 4.1%	48%	44%	2%	2%	4%

== North Dakota ==
Donald Trump vs. Kamala Harris

Poll source	Date(s) administered	Sample size	Margin of error	Donald Trump Republican	Kamala Harris Democratic–NPL	Other / Undecided
Lake Research Partners (D) (Note: Poll sponsored by the campaign of Katrina Christiansen, the Democratic nominee for North Dakota's Class 1 Senate seat)	September 23–26, 2024	500 (LV)	–	50%	40%	10%

Donald Trump vs. Kamala Harris vs. Chase Oliver

Poll source	Date(s) administered	Sample size	Margin of error	Donald Trump Republican	Kamala Harris Democratic–NPL	Chase Oliver Libertarian	Other / Undecided
WPA Intelligence (R) (Note: Poll sponsored by North Dakota News Cooperative)	September 28–30, 2024	500 (LV)	± 4.4%	59%	32%	1%	8%

== Ohio ==
Donald Trump vs. Kamala Harris

Aggregate polls

Source of poll aggregation	Dates administered	Dates updated	Kamala Harris Democratic	Donald Trump Republican	Other / Undecided (Note: Calculated by taking the difference of 100% and all other candidates combined.)	Margin
270ToWin	October 22 – November 4, 2024	November 4, 2024	44.3%	52.0%	3.7%	Trump +7.7%
538	through November 4, 2024	November 4, 2024	43.4%	52.3%	4.3%	Trump +8.8%
The Hill/DDHQ	through November 3, 2024	November 3, 2024	44.6%	52.2%	3.2%	Trump +7.6%
Average			44.1%	52.2%	3.7%	Trump +8.1%

Poll source	Date(s) administered	Sample size	Margin of error	Donald Trump Republican	Kamala Harris Democratic	Other / Undecided
AtlasIntel	November 3–4, 2024	1,022 (LV)	± 3.0%	54%	45%	1%
Trafalgar Group (R)	November 2–4, 2024	1,095 (LV)	± 2.9%	52%	45%	3%
Emerson College (Note: Poll sponsored by The Hill)	October 30 − November 2, 2024	900 (LV)	± 3.2%	54%	42%	4% (Note: "Someone else" with 2%)
Emerson College	October 30 − November 2, 2024	900 (LV)	± 3.2%	54.7% (Note: With voters who lean towards a given candidate)	43.5%	1.9%
Morning Consult	October 23 − November 1, 2024	1,254 (LV)	± 3.0%	53%	44%	3%
Trafalgar Group (R) (Note: Poll sponsored by Ohio Press Network)	October 25–28, 2024	1,127 (LV)	± 2.9%	52%	46%	2%
ActiVote	October 5−28, 2024	400 (LV)	± 4.9%	54%	46%	–
CES/YouGov	October 1–25, 2024	3,120 (A)	–	52%	45%	3%
CES/YouGov	October 1–25, 2024	3,091 (LV)	–	52%	45%	3%
J.L. Partners	October 22−24, 2024	997 (LV)	± 3.1%	53%	44%	3%
University of Akron	September 12 – October 24, 2024	1,241 (RV)	± 2.8%	51%	44%	5%
Bowling Green State University/YouGov	October 10−21, 2024	1,000 (LV)	± 3.6%	50%	43%	5% (Note: "Some other candidate" with 2%)
Morning Consult	October 6−15, 2024	1,243 (LV)	± 3.0%	52%	45%	3%
Rasmussen Reports (R)	October 9−14, 2024	1,051 (LV)	± 3.0%	51%	44%	5%
Washington Post	October 3–7, 2024	1,002 (RV)	± 3.5%	51%	44%	5% (Note: "Someone else" & "Would not vote" with 1% each)
Washington Post	October 3–7, 2024	1,002 (LV)	± 3.5%	51%	45%	4%
Marist College	October 3–7, 2024	1,511 (RV)	± 3.0%	52%	46%	2% (Note: "Another party's candidates" with 1%)
Marist College	October 3–7, 2024	1,327 (LV)	± 3.2%	52%	46%	2%
ActiVote	August 28 – September 30, 2024	400 (LV)	± 4.9%	54%	46%	–
Bowling Green State University/YouGov	September 18–27, 2024	1,000 (LV)	± 3.6%	51%	44%	5% (Note: "Some other candidate" with 1%)
New York Times/Siena College	September 21–26, 2024	687 (RV)	± 4.0%	49%	45%	6%
New York Times/Siena College	September 21–26, 2024	687 (LV)	± 4.0%	50%	44%	6%
RMG Research	September 18−20, 2024	757 (LV)	± 3.5%	54%	43%	3% (Note: "Some other candidate" with 2%; "Would not vote" with 1%)
Morning Consult	September 9−18, 2024	1,488 (LV)	± 3.0%	52%	43%	5%
Morning Consult	August 30 – September 8, 2024	1,558 (LV)	± 3.0%	52%	44%	4%
Emerson College	September 3–5, 2024	945 (LV)	± 3.1%	53%	43%	4%
Emerson College	September 3–5, 2024	945 (LV)	± 3.1%	54%	45%	1%
SoCal Strategies (R)	August 31 – September 1, 2024	600 (LV)	–	52%	43%	5%
	August 23, 2024	Robert F. Kennedy Jr. suspends his presidential campaign and endorses Donald Trump.				
ActiVote	August 2–22, 2024	400 (LV)	± 4.9%	56%	44%	–
	August 19–22, 2024	Democratic National Convention				
Rasmussen Reports (R)	August 13–17, 2024	1,267 (LV)	–	51%	44%	5%
	August 6, 2024	Kamala Harris selects Gov. Tim Walz as her running mate.				
Fabrizio Ward (R)/Impact Research (D)	July 23–28, 2024	600 (LV)	± 4.0%	52%	42%	6%
	July 21, 2024	Joe Biden announces his withdrawal from the race; Kamala Harris declares her candidacy for president.				
	July 15–19, 2024	Republican National Convention				
	July 13, 2024	attempted assassination of Donald Trump				
Ohio Northern University	March 6–11, 2024	1,241 (LV)	± 3.3%	51%	38%	11%

Donald Trump vs. Kamala Harris vs. Cornel West vs. Jill Stein vs. Chase Oliver

Poll source	Date(s) administered	Sample size	Margin of error	Donald Trump Republican	Kamala Harris Democratic	Cornel West Independent	Jill Stein Green	Chase Oliver Libertarian	Other / Undecided
AtlasIntel	November 3–4, 2024	1,022 (LV)	± 3.0%	54%	45%	–	1%	0%	–
Focaldata	October 3 – November 1, 2024	2,161 (LV)	–	53%	44%	–	0%	1%	2%
Focaldata	October 3 – November 1, 2024	1,867 (RV)	± 2.1%	52%	45%	–	0%	2%	1%
Focaldata	October 3 – November 1, 2024	2,161 (A)	–	53%	42%	–	0%	2%	3%
OnMessage Inc. (R)	October 19–22, 2024	600 (LV)	± 4.0%	52%	44%	–	1%	1%	2%
New York Times/Siena College	September 21–26, 2024	687 (RV)	± 4.0%	47%	44%	–	2%	2%	5%
New York Times/Siena College	September 21–26, 2024	687 (LV)	± 4.0%	49%	43%	–	2%	2%	4%

== Oklahoma ==
Donald Trump vs. Kamala Harris

Poll source	Date(s) administered	Sample size	Margin of error	Donald Trump Republican	Kamala Harris Democratic	Other / Undecided
ActiVote	October 3–29, 2024	400 (LV)	± 4.9%	67%	33%	–
ActiVote	September 13 – October 19, 2024	400 (LV)	± 4.9%	66%	34%	–
SoonerPoll	August 24–31, 2024	323 (LV)	± 5.5%	56%	40%	4%

== Oregon ==
Kamala Harris vs. Donald Trump

Poll source	Date(s) administered	Sample size	Margin of error	Kamala Harris Democratic	Donald Trump Republican	Other / Undecided
Public Policy Polling (D) (Note: This poll was sponsored by the Northwest Progressive Institute)	October 16–17, 2024	716 (LV)	± 3.7%	53%	41%	6%
Hoffman Research	July 24–26, 2024	700 (LV)	± 3.7%	49%	44%	7%

== Pennsylvania ==
Kamala Harris vs. Donald Trump

Aggregate polls

Source of poll aggregation	Dates administered	Dates updated	Kamala Harris Democratic	Donald Trump Republican	Other / Undecided (Note: Calculated by taking the difference of 100% and all other candidates combined.)	Margin
270ToWin	October 23 – November 4, 2024	November 4, 2024	48.2%	48.2%	3.6%	Tie
538	through November 4, 2024	November 4, 2024	47.9%	47.7%	4.4%	Harris +0.2%
Silver Bulletin	through November 4, 2024	November 4, 2024	48.0%	48.1%	3.9%	Trump +0.1%
Real Clear Politics	through November 4, 2024	November 4, 2024	48.5%	48.9%	2.6%	Trump +0.4%
The Hill/DDHQ	through November 4, 2024	November 4, 2024	48.0%	48.8%	3.2%	Trump +0.8%
Average			48.12%	48.34%	3.8%	Trump +0.22%

Poll source	Date(s) administered	Sample size	Margin of error	Kamala Harris Democratic	Donald Trump Republican	Other / Undecided
HarrisX	November 3–5, 2024	2,333 (RV)	± 2.3%	49%	45%	6%
HarrisX	November 3–5, 2024	2,333 (RV)	± 2.3%	52%	48%	–
HarrisX	November 3–5, 2024	2,103 (LV)	± 2.3%	51%	46%	3%
HarrisX	November 3–5, 2024	2,103 (LV)	± 2.3%	52%	48%	–
AtlasIntel	November 3–4, 2024	1,840 (LV)	± 2.0%	49%	50%	1%
Research Co.	November 2–3, 2024	450 (LV)	± 4.6%	48%	47%	5%
Trafalgar Group (R)	November 1–3, 2024	1,089 (LV)	± 2.9%	47%	48%	5%
Patriot Polling	November 1–3, 2024	903 (RV)	± 3.0%	49%	50%	1%
InsiderAdvantage (R)	November 1–2, 2024	800 (LV)	± 3.5%	48%	49%	3%
AtlasIntel	November 1–2, 2024	2,049 (LV)	± 2.0%	48%	50%	2%
Emerson College	October 30 – November 2, 2024	1,000 (LV)	± 3.0%	48%	49%	3%
Emerson College	October 30 – November 2, 2024	1,000 (LV)	± 3.0%	49%	50%	1%
The New York Times/Siena College/The Philadelphia Inquirer	October 29 – November 2, 2024	1,527 (RV)	± 3.5%	47%	47%	5%
The New York Times/Siena College/The Philadelphia Inquirer	October 29 – November 2, 2024	1,527 (LV)	± 3.5%	48%	48%	4%
Mainstreet Research/Florida Atlantic University	October 25 – November 2, 2024	798 (RV)	± 3.1%	48%	46%	6% (Note: "Another Candidate" with 2%)
Mainstreet Research/Florida Atlantic University	October 25 – November 2, 2024	699 (LV)	± 3.1%	49%	47%	4% (Note: "Another Candidate" with 1%)
ActiVote	October 10 – November 2, 2024	400 (LV)	± 4.9%	50.5%	49.5%	–
SoCal Strategies (R)	October 30–31, 2024	850 (LV)	± 3.6%	50%	48%	2%
AtlasIntel	October 30–31, 2024	1,738 (LV)	± 2.0%	48%	49%	3%
OnMessage Inc. (R)	October 29–31, 2024	800 (LV)	–	47%	49%	4%
YouGov	October 25–31, 2024	982 (RV)	± 3.5%	50%	48%	2%
YouGov	October 25–31, 2024	956 (LV)	± 3.5%	51%	48%	1%
Morning Consult	October 22−31, 2024	1,395 (LV)	± 3.0%	48%	48%	4%
Muhlenberg College/Morning Call	October 27–30, 2024	460 (RV)	± 6.0%	49%	47%	4% (Note: "Neither/Other" with 2%)
Marist College	October 27–30, 2024	1,558 (RV)	± 3.2%	51%	47%	2% (Note: "Another Party's Candidate" with 1%)
Marist College	October 27–30, 2024	1,400 (LV)	± 3.4%	50%	48%	2%
Echelon Insights	October 27–30, 2024	600 (LV)	± 4.5%	46%	52%	2%
The Washington Post	October 26–30, 2024	1,204 (LV)	± 3.1%	48%	47%	5%
AtlasIntel	October 25–29, 2024	1,299 (LV)	± 3.0%	47%	50%	3%
Rasmussen Reports (R)	October 25–28, 2024	849 (LV)	± 3.0%	47%	49%	4%
Fox News	October 24–28, 2024	1,310 (RV)	± 2.5%	50%	48%	2%
Fox News	October 24–28, 2024	1,057 (LV)	± 3.0%	49%	50%	1%
Quinnipiac University	October 24–28, 2024	2,186 (LV)	± 2.1%	47%	49%	4%
CBS News/YouGov	October 22–28, 2024	1,273 (LV)	± 3.5%	49%	49%	1% (Note: "Someone else/third party" with 1%)
InsiderAdvantage (R)	October 26–27, 2024	800 (LV)	± 3.5%	47%	48%	5%
Redfield & Wilton Strategies	October 25–27, 2024	1,116 (LV)	± 2.8%	48%	48%	4%
North Star Opinion Research (R) (Note: Poll sponsored by American Greatness)	October 22–26, 2024	600 (LV)	± 4.0%	47%	47%	6%
CES/YouGov	October 1–25, 2024	3,708 (A)	–	50%	47%	3%
CES/YouGov	October 1–25, 2024	3,685 (LV)	–	49%	48%	3%
Emerson College (Note: Poll sponsored by RealClearPennsylvania)	October 21–22, 2024	860 (LV)	± 3.4%	48%	49%	3%
Emerson College	October 21–22, 2024	860 (LV)	± 3.4%	49%	51%	–
Redfield & Wilton Strategies	October 20–22, 2024	1,586 (LV)	± 2.3%	48%	47%	5%
Susquehanna Polling and Research (R) (Note: Poll sponsored by La Torre Live)	October 18−22, 2024	500 (LV)	± 4.4%	46%	46%	8%
Quantus Insights (R) (Note: Poll sponsored by TrendingPolitics)	October 17−20, 2024	840 (LV)	± 3.0%	48%	50%	2%
Bloomberg/Morning Consult	October 16–20, 2024	866 (RV)	± 3.0%	48%	48%	4%
Bloomberg/Morning Consult	October 16–20, 2024	812 (LV)	± 3.0%	50%	48%	2%
Franklin & Marshall College	October 9−20, 2024	890 (RV)	± 4.3%	48%	44%	8%
Franklin & Marshall College	October 9−20, 2024	583 (LV)	± 5.0%	49%	50%	1%
Trafalgar Group (R)	October 17−19, 2024	1,084 (LV)	± 2.9%	43%	46%	11% (Note: "Other" with 5%)
The Bullfinch Group	October 11−18, 2024	600 (LV)	± 4.0%	49%	49%	2%
The Bullfinch Group	October 11−18, 2024	600 (LV)	± 4.0%	49%	48%	3% (Note: "A third party / Independent candidate" with 2%)
AtlasIntel	October 12–17, 2024	2,048 (LV)	± 2.0%	47%	50%	3%
Rose Institute/YouGov	October 7–17, 2024	1,062 (RV)	± 3.4%	48%	46%	6% (Note: "Other" with 6%)
Rose Institute/YouGov	October 7–17, 2024	1,043 (LV)	± 3.4%	50%	48%	2%
Morning Consult	October 6−15, 2024	1,395 (LV)	± 3.0%	49%	48%	3%
The Washington Post/Schar School	September 30 – October 15, 2024	707 (RV)	± 4.6%	49%	46%	5%
The Washington Post/Schar School	September 30 – October 15, 2024	707 (LV)	± 4.6%	49%	47%	4%
Rasmussen Reports (R)	October 9–13, 2024	1,072 (LV)	± 3.0%	47%	50%	3%
The New York Times/Siena College/The Philadelphia Inquirer	October 7–10, 2024	857 (RV)	± 4.0%	50%	47%	4%
The New York Times/Siena College/The Philadelphia Inquirer	October 7–10, 2024	857 (LV)	± 4.0%	50%	47%	3%
American Pulse Research & Polling	October 2–10, 2024	1,193 (LV)	± 2.8%	49.5%	50.5%	–
TIPP Insights	October 7–9, 2024	1,079 (RV)	± 3.5%	49%	45%	6%
TIPP Insights	October 7–9, 2024	803 (LV)	± 3.5%	48%	49%	3%
Fabrizio, Lee & Associates (R)/McLaughlin & Associates (R)	October 6–9, 2024	800 (LV)	± 3.5%	48%	49%	3%
InsiderAdvantage (R)	October 7–8, 2024	800 (LV)	± 3.5%	47%	49%	4%
Emerson College	October 5–8, 2024	1,000 (LV)	± 3.0%	48%	49%	3%
Emerson College	October 5–8, 2024	1,000 (LV)	± 3.0%	49%	50%	1%
The Wall Street Journal	September 28 – October 8, 2024	600 (RV)	± 5.0%	46%	47%	7%
Research Co.	October 5–7, 2024	450 (LV)	± 4.6%	48%	47%	5%
Research Co.	October 5–7, 2024	450 (LV)	± 4.6%	50%	49%	1%
Quinnipiac University	October 3–7, 2024	1,412 (LV)	± 2.6%	49%	47%	4%
Hunt Research (Note: Poll conducted for the University of Austin)	October 2–7, 2024	1,037 (LV)	± 3.0%	47%	48%	5%
Center for Working Class Politics/YouGov (Note: Poll sponsored by Jacobin)	September 24 – October 2, 2024	1,000 (RV)	± 4.2%	47%	45%	8% (Note: "Another Candidate" with 3%)
OnMessage Inc. (R)	September 24 – October 2, 2024	500 (LV)	± 4.4%	46%	46%	8%
OnMessage Inc. (R) (Note: Poll conducted for the Sentinel Action Fund PAC)	September 28–29, 2024	800 (LV)	± 3.5%	47%	47%	6%
Patriot Polling	September 27–29, 2024	816 (RV)	–	49%	50%	1%
The Bullfinch Group (Note: Poll sponsored by Commonwealth Foundation)	September 26–29, 2024	800 (RV)	± 3.5%	50%	46%	4%
Trafalgar Group (R)	September 26–29, 2024	1,090 (LV)	± 2.9%	45%	48%	7%
Global Strategy Group (D)/North Star Opinion Research (R)	September 23–29, 2024	408 (LV)	± 4.9%	48%	48%	4%
Emerson College	September 27–28, 2024	1,000 (LV)	± 3.0%	48%	48%	4%
Emerson College	September 27–28, 2024	1,000 (LV)	± 3.0%	49%	49%	2%
AtlasIntel	September 20–25, 2024	1,775 (LV)	± 2.0%	48%	51%	1%
Cook Political Report/BSG (R)/GS Strategy Group (D)	September 19–25, 2024	474 (LV)	–	50%	49%	1%
Bloomberg/Morning Consult	September 19–25, 2024	993 (RV)	± 3.0%	49%	46%	5%
Bloomberg/Morning Consult	September 19–25, 2024	924 (LV)	± 3.0%	51%	46%	3%
ActiVote	September 1–25, 2024	400 (LV)	± 4.9%	52%	48%	–
Fox News	September 20−24, 2024	1,021 (RV)	± 3.0%	50%	48%	2%
Fox News	September 20−24, 2024	775 (LV)	± 3.5%	49%	49%	2%
Fabrizio Ward (R)/Impact Research (D)	September 17–24, 2024	600 (LV)	± 4.0%	50%	47%	3%
Rodriguez Gudelunas Strategies (Note: Poll sponsored by Focus on Rural America)	September 19–23, 2024	400 (LV)	–	48%	48%	4%
Rasmussen Reports (R)	September 19–22, 2024	1,202 (LV)	± 3.0%	48%	48%	4%
Rasmussen Reports (R)	September 19–22, 2024	1,202 (LV)	± 3.0%	50%	49%	1%
Susquehanna Polling and Research (R)	September 16–22, 2024	700 (LV)	± 3.7%	46%	46%	8%
RMG Research	September 18–20, 2024	783 (LV)	± 3.5%	48%	47%	5% (Note: "Some other candidate" with 3%)
RMG Research	September 18–20, 2024	783 (LV)	± 3.5%	49%	49%	3% (Note: "Would not vote" with 1%)
Muhlenberg College/Morning Call	September 16–19, 2024	450 (RV)	± 6.0%	48%	48%	4% (Note: "Neither/Other" with 4%)
Emerson College	September 15–18, 2024	880 (LV)	± 3.2%	47%	48%	5%
Emerson College	September 15–18, 2024	880 (LV)	± 3.2%	50%	49%	1%
MassINC Polling Group (Note: Poll sponsored by Spotlight PA)	September 12−18, 2024	800 (LV)	± 4.0%	52%	47%	1%
Morning Consult	September 9−18, 2024	1,756 (LV)	± 2.0%	49%	47%	4%
Marist College	September 12−17, 2024	1,663 (RV)	± 3.0%	49%	48%	3% (Note: "Another Party's Candidate" with 2%)
Marist College	September 12−17, 2024	1,476 (LV)	± 3.2%	49%	49%	2%
The Washington Post	September 12−16, 2024	1,003 (RV)	± 3.6%	48%	47%	5%
The Washington Post	September 12−16, 2024	1,003 (LV)	± 3.6%	48%	48%	4%
Quinnipiac University	September 12−16, 2024	1,331 (LV)	± 2.7%	51%	46%	2%
The New York Times/Siena College/The Philadelphia Inquirer	September 11−16, 2024	1,082 (RV)	± 3.8%	50%	46%	4%
The New York Times/Siena College/The Philadelphia Inquirer	September 11−16, 2024	1,082 (LV)	± 3.8%	50%	46%	4%
Suffolk University/USA Today	September 11−16, 2024	500 (LV)	± 4.4%	49%	46%	5%
InsiderAdvantage (R)	September 14−15, 2024	800 (LV)	± 3.5%	48%	50%	2%
	September 10, 2024	The presidential debate between Harris and Trump hosted by ABC				
Morning Consult	August 30 – September 8, 2024	1,910 (LV)	± 2.0%	49%	46%	5%
co/efficient (R)	September 4–6, 2024	889 (LV)	± 3.3%	46%	48%	6%
CBS News/YouGov	September 3–6, 2024	1,078 (LV)	± 3.5%	50%	50%	–
Patriot Polling	September 1–3, 2024	857 (RV)	–	48%	49%	3%
Trafalgar Group (R)	August 28–30, 2024	1,082 (LV)	± 2.9%	45%	47%	8%
Wick Insights (Note: Poll sponsored by 2WAY)	August 27–29, 2024	1,607 (LV)	–	49%	49%	2%
Emerson College	August 25–28, 2024	950 (LV)	± 3.1%	48%	48%	4%
Emerson College	August 25–28, 2024	950 (LV)	± 3.1%	49%	49%	1%
Bloomberg/Morning Consult	August 23–26, 2024	803 (LV)	± 4.0%	51%	47%	2%
Bloomberg/Morning Consult	August 23–26, 2024	758 (RV)	± 3.0%	51%	48%	1%
SoCal Strategies (R)	August 23, 2024	713 (LV)	–	47%	48%	5%
SoCal Strategies (R)	August 23, 2024	800 (RV)	–	47%	47%	6%
	August 23, 2024	Robert F. Kennedy Jr. suspends his presidential campaign and endorses Donald Trump.				
YouGov	August 15–23, 2024	500 (A)	± 5.1%	43%	43%	14% (Note: "Will not vote" with 6%)
YouGov	August 15–23, 2024	– (LV)	± 6.0%	47%	47%	6% (Note: "Will not vote" with 1%)
	August 22, 2024	Democratic National Convention concludes				
Institute for Global Affairs/YouGov	August 15–22, 2024	350 (A)	± 6.0%	40%	44%	16% (Note: "I am eligible to vote but would not" with 8%; "Other" with 7%; "I am not eligible to vote" with 1%)
ActiVote	August 5–22, 2024	400 (LV)	± 4.9%	51%	49%	–
Fabrizio Ward (R)	August 19–21, 2024	400 (LV)	± 4.9%	46%	47%	7%
Spry Strategies (R)	August 14–20, 2024	600 (LV)	± 4.0%	48%	47%	5%
InsiderAdvantage (R)	August 18–19, 2024	800 (LV)	± 3.5%	46%	47%	7%
Rasmussen Reports (R)	August 13–17, 2024	1,312 (LV)	± 3.0%	46%	47%	7%
Focaldata	August 6–16, 2024	719 (LV)	± 3.7%	50%	50%	–
Cygnal (R)	August 14–15, 2024	800 (LV)	± 3.4%	48%	47%	5%
Emerson College	August 13–14, 2024	1,000 (RV)	± 3.0%	48%	49%	3%
Emerson College	August 13–14, 2024	1,000 (RV)	± 3.0%	49%	51%	–
Quinnipiac University	August 8–12, 2024	1,738 (LV)	± 2.4%	50%	47%	3%
The Bullfinch Group	August 8–11, 2024	500 (RV)	± 4.4%	49%	45%	6%
The New York Times/Siena College	August 6–9, 2024	693 (RV)	± 4.2%	49%	46%	5%
The New York Times/Siena College	August 6–9, 2024	693 (LV)	± 4.2%	50%	46%	4%
Trafalgar Group (R)	August 6–8, 2024	1,078 (LV)	± 2.9%	44%	46%	10%
Navigator Research (D)	July 31 – August 8, 2024	600 (LV)	± 4.0%	46%	48%	6%
Cook Political Report/BSG (R)/GS Strategy Group (D)	July 26 – August 8, 2024	411 (LV)	–	49%	48%	3%
Fabrizio, Lee & Associates (R) (Note: Poll commissioned by Early Vote Action PAC)	July 29 – August 1, 2024	600 (LV)	–	48%	48%	4%
Public Policy Polling (D)	July 29–30, 2024	627 (RV)	± 3.9%	47%	48%	5%
GQR Research (D)	July 26–30, 2024	500 (LV)	± 4.4%	50%	46%	4% (Note: Chase Oliver (L) with 2%)
Public Opinion Strategies (R)	July 23–29, 2024	400 (LV)	± 4.9%	48%	45%	7%
Quantus Insights (R)	July 27–28, 2024	500 (RV)	± 4.4%	46%	48%	6%
Bloomberg/Morning Consult	July 24–28, 2024	804 (RV)	± 4.0%	46%	50%	4%
The Bullfinch Group	July 23–25, 2024	800 (RV)	± 3.5%	48%	47%	5%
Fox News	July 22–24, 2024	1,034 (RV)	± 3.0%	49%	49%	2%
Emerson College	July 22–23, 2024	850 (RV)	± 3.3%	46%	48%	6%
Emerson College	July 22–23, 2024	850 (RV)	± 3.3%	49%	51%	–
	July 21, 2024	Joe Biden announces his withdrawal from the race; Kamala Harris declares her candidacy for president.				
North Star Opinion Research (R)	July 20–23, 2024	600 (LV)	± 4.0%	45%	47%	9%
SoCal Strategies (R)	July 20–21, 2024	500 (LV)	± 4.4%	46%	50%	4%
	July 19, 2024	Republican National Convention concludes				
InsiderAdvantage (R)	July 15–16, 2024	800 (LV)	± 3.5%	40%	47%	13%
	July 15, 2024	Republican National Convention begins				
	July 13, 2024	Attempted assassination of Donald Trump				
Public Policy Polling (D)	July 11–12, 2024	537 (RV)	–	45%	51%	4%
The New York Times/Siena College	July 9–11, 2024	872 (RV)	± 3.7%	46%	48%	6%
The New York Times/Siena College	July 9–11, 2024	872 (LV)	± 3.7%	47%	48%	5%
Bloomberg/Morning Consult	May 7–13, 2024	812 (RV)	± 3.0%	43%	50%	7%
Emerson College	February 14–16, 2024	1,000 (RV)	± 3.0%	40%	49%	11%
The New York Times/Siena College	October 22 – November 3, 2023	600 (RV)	± 4.6%	44%	47%	9%
The New York Times/Siena College	October 22 – November 3, 2023	600 (LV)	± 4.6%	44%	48%	8%

Kamala Harris vs. Donald Trump vs. Cornel West vs. Jill Stein vs. Chase Oliver

Aggregate polls

Source of poll aggregation	Dates administered	Dates updated	Kamala Harris Democratic	Donald Trump Republican	Jill Stein Green	Cornel West Independent	Chase Oliver Libertarian	Others/ Undecided	Margin
Race to the WH	through October 28, 2024	November 2, 2024	48.0%	47.5%	1.0%	—N/a	0.6%	2.9%	Harris +0.5%
270toWin	October 17 – 28, 2024	November 2, 2024	47.9%	47.9%	0.8%	—N/a	0.7%	2.7%	Tie
Average			47.95%	47.7%	0.9%	—N/a	0.65%	2.8%	Harris +0.25%

Poll source	Date(s) administered	Sample size	Margin of error	Kamala Harris Democratic	Donald Trump Republican	Cornel West Independent	Jill Stein Green	Chase Oliver Libertarian	Other / Undecided
HarrisX	November 3–5, 2024	2,333 (RV)	± 2.3%	48%	45%	1%	1%	–	5%
HarrisX	November 3–5, 2024	2,333 (RV)	± 2.3%	50%	47%	2%	1%	–	–
HarrisX	November 3–5, 2024	2,103 (LV)	± 2.3%	50%	46%	1%	0%	–	3%
HarrisX	November 3–5, 2024	2,103 (LV)	± 2.3%	51.0%	47.5%	1.0%	0.5%	–	–
AtlasIntel	November 3–4, 2024	1,840 (LV)	± 2.0%	48%	49%	–	1%	0%	2%
Survation	November 1–4, 2024	941 (LV)	± 3.9%	49%	47%	–	1%	1%	2%
Survation	November 1–4, 2024	915 (LV)	± 3.9%	50.6%	47.8%	–	0.9%	0.7%	–
AtlasIntel	November 1–2, 2024	2,049 (LV)	± 2.0%	47%	49%	–	1%	1%	2%
The New York Times/Siena College/The Philadelphia Inquirer	October 29 – November 2, 2024	1,527 (RV)	± 3.5%	46%	47%	–	1%	1%	5%
The New York Times/Siena College/The Philadelphia Inquirer	October 29 – November 2, 2024	1,527 (LV)	± 3.5%	47%	47%	–	1%	0%	5%
Focaldata	October 3 – November 1, 2024	2,373 (LV)	–	50%	48%	–	1%	1%	–
Focaldata	October 3 – November 1, 2024	2,119 (RV)	± 2.0%	51%	47%	–	1%	1%	–
Focaldata	October 3 – November 1, 2024	2,373 (A)	–	49%	47%	–	1%	2%	1%
AtlasIntel	October 30–31, 2024	1,738 (LV)	± 2.0%	47%	49%	–	1%	1%	2%
Data for Progress (D)	October 25–31, 2024	908 (LV)	± 3.0%	50%	48%	–	1%	0%	2%
YouGov	October 25–31, 2024	982 (RV)	± 3.5%	48%	46%	0%	1%	–	5%
YouGov	October 25–31, 2024	956 (LV)	± 3.5%	49%	46%	0%	0%	–	5%
Redfield & Wilton Strategies	October 28–31, 2024	1,596 (LV)	–	48%	48%	–	0%	1%	3%
Suffolk University/USA Today	October 27–30, 2024	500 (LV)	± 4.4%	49%	49%	–	0%	1%	1%
Echelon Insights	October 27–30, 2024	600 (LV)	± 4.5%	46%	51%	–	1%	0%	2%
The Washington Post	October 26–30, 2024	1,204 (RV)	± 3.1%	48%	47%	–	1%	1%	3%
The Washington Post	October 26–30, 2024	1,204 (LV)	± 3.1%	48%	47%	–	1%	1%	3%
AtlasIntel	October 25–29, 2024	1,299 (LV)	± 3.0%	47%	49%	–	1%	1%	2%
Quinnipiac University	October 24–28, 2024	2,186 (LV)	± 2.1%	46%	47%	–	2%	1%	4%
CNN/SSRS	October 23–28, 2024	819 (LV)	± 4.7%	48%	48%	–	1%	1%	2%
Redfield & Wilton Strategies	October 25–27, 2024	1,116 (LV)	–	48%	48%	–	0%	1%	3%
North Star Opinion Research (R)	October 22–26, 2024	600 (LV)	± 4.0%	47%	47%	–	1%	1%	4%
University of Massachusetts Lowell/YouGov	October 16–23, 2024	800 (LV)	± 4.0%	48%	47%	–	1%	1%	3%
Redfield & Wilton Strategies	October 20–22, 2024	1,586 (LV)	–	48%	47%	–	0%	1%	4%
Bloomberg/Morning Consult	October 16–20, 2024	866 (RV)	± 3.0%	48%	48%	–	0%	2%	2%
Bloomberg/Morning Consult	October 16–20, 2024	812 (LV)	± 3.0%	50%	48%	–	0%	1%	1%
Franklin & Marshall College	October 9–20, 2024	890 (RV)	± 4.3%	49%	45%	–	2%	1%	3%
Redfield & Wilton Strategies	October 16–18, 2024	1,256 (LV)	–	48%	48%	–	0%	1%	3%
AtlasIntel	October 12–17, 2024	2,048 (LV)	± 2.0%	47%	50%	–	2%	0%	1%
Redfield & Wilton Strategies	October 12–14, 2024	1,649 (LV)	–	48%	48%	–	0%	1%	3%
The New York Times/Siena College/The Philadelphia Inquirer	October 7–10, 2024	857 (RV)	± 4.0%	49%	45%	–	2%	1%	3%
The New York Times/Siena College/The Philadelphia Inquirer	October 7–10, 2024	857 (LV)	± 4.0%	49%	45%	–	1%	0%	5%
American Pulse Research & Polling	October 2–10, 2024	1,193 (LV)	–	48%	49%	–	2%	0%	1%
Redfield & Wilton Strategies	October 8–9, 2024	707 (LV)	–	46%	48%	–	0%	1%	5%
TIPP Insights	October 7–9, 2024	1,079 (RV)	± 3.5%	49%	45%	1%	1%	–	4%
TIPP Insights	October 7–9, 2024	803 (LV)	± 3.5%	48%	49%	1%	0%	–	2%
University of Massachusetts Lowell/YouGov	October 2–9, 2024	800 (LV)	± 4.0%	46%	45%	–	1%	0%	8%
J.L. Partners (Note: Poll sponsored by The Daily Mail)	October 5–8, 2024	800 (LV)	± 3.5%	47%	47%	–	1%	1%	4%
Quinnipiac University	October 3–7, 2024	1,412 (LV)	± 2.6%	49%	46%	–	1%	1%	3%
Hunt Research	October 2–7, 2024	1,037 (LV)	± 3.0%	47%	47%	–	1%	1%	4%
Redfield & Wilton Strategies	September 27 – October 2, 2024	5,686 (LV)	–	48%	47%	–	0%	1%	4%
The Bullfinch Group	September 26–29, 2024	800 (RV)	± 3.5%	50%	46%	–	1%	0%	3%
AtlasIntel	September 20–25, 2024	1,775 (LV)	± 2.0%	48%	51%	–	0%	0%	1%
Bloomberg/Morning Consult	September 19–25, 2024	993 (RV)	± 3.0%	50%	44%	–	0%	4%	2%
Bloomberg/Morning Consult	September 19–25, 2024	924 (LV)	± 3.0%	51%	45%	–	0%	3%	1%
Fox News	September 20−24, 2024	1,021 (RV)	± 3.0%	48%	46%	–	1%	2%	3%
Fox News	September 20−24, 2024	775 (LV)	± 3.5%	47%	48%	–	2%	2%	1%
Fabrizio Ward (R)/Impact Research (D)	September 17–24, 2024	600 (LV)	± 4.0%	49%	47%	–	1%	0%	3%
Redfield & Wilton Strategies	September 16–19, 2024	1,086 (LV)	–	47%	47%	–	0%	1%	5%
University of Massachusetts Lowell/YouGov	September 11–19, 2024	800 (LV)	± 4.0%	48%	46%	–	1%	1%	4%
MassINC Polling Group	September 12−18, 2024	800 (LV)	± 4.0%	50%	46%	−	1%	0%	3%
Quinnipiac University	September 12−16, 2024	1,331 (LV)	± 2.7%	51%	45%	−	1%	0%	3%
Franklin & Marshall College	September 4–15, 2024	890 (RV)	± 4.1%	49%	46%	–	1%	1%	3%
Redfield & Wilton Strategies	September 6–9, 2024	801 (LV)	–	45%	45%	–	0%	1%	9%
YouGov	August 23 – September 3, 2024	1,000 (RV)	± 3.6%	46%	45%	0%	1%	–	8%
Wick Insights	August 27–29, 2024	1,607 (LV)	–	47%	48%	–	1%	1%	3%
CNN/SSRS	August 23–29, 2024	789 (LV)	± 4.7%	47%	47%	–	1%	1%	4%
Redfield & Wilton Strategies	August 25–28, 2024	1,071 (LV)	–	46%	45%	–	1%	0%	8%
Bloomberg/Morning Consult	August 23–26, 2024	803 (LV)	± 4.0%	51%	46%	–	1%	1%	1%
Bloomberg/Morning Consult	August 23–26, 2024	758 (RV)	± 3.0%	51%	45%	–	2%	1%	1%

Kamala Harris vs. Donald Trump vs. Jill Stein

Poll source	Date(s) administered	Sample size	Margin of error	Kamala Harris Democratic	Donald Trump Republican	Jill Stein Green	Other / Undecided
Cook Political Report/BSG (R)/GS Strategy Group (D)	September 19–25, 2024	474 (LV)	–	49%	47%	1%	3%
Remington Research Group (R)	September 16–20, 2024	800 (LV)	± 3.5%	47%	48%	1%	4%
The Washington Post	September 12−16, 2024	1,003 (RV)	± 3.6%	48%	47%	1%	4%
The Washington Post	September 12−16, 2024	1,003 (LV)	± 3.6%	48%	47%	1%	4%

== Rhode Island ==
Kamala Harris vs. Donald Trump

Poll source	Date(s) administered	Sample size	Margin of error	Kamala Harris Democratic	Donald Trump Republican	Other / Undecided
MassINC Polling Group (Note: Poll sponsored by Rhode Island Current)	September 12–18, 2024	800 (LV)	± 3.9%	56%	43%	1%

Kamala Harris vs. Donald Trump vs. Cornel West vs. Jill Stein vs. Chase Oliver

Poll source	Date(s) administered	Sample size	Margin of error	Kamala Harris Democratic	Donald Trump Republican	Cornel West Independent	Jill Stein Green	Chase Oliver Libertarian	Other / Undecided
University of New Hampshire	September 12–16, 2024	683 (LV)	± 3.7%	58%	38%	–	2%	0%	2% (Note: "Another candidate" with 1%; "Don't know/Not sure" with 1%)

Kamala Harris vs. Donald Trump vs. Robert F. Kennedy Jr. vs. Cornel West vs. Jill Stein vs. Chase Oliver

Poll source	Date(s) administered	Sample size	Margin of error	Kamala Harris Democratic	Donald Trump Republican	Robert F. Kennedy Jr. Independent	Cornel West Independent	Jill Stein Green	Chase Oliver Libertarian	Other / Undecided
MassINC Polling Group	September 12–18, 2024	800 (LV)	± 3.9%	53%	40%	2%	0%	1%	–	4%

Kamala Harris vs. Donald Trump vs. Robert F. Kennedy Jr.

Poll source	Date(s) administered	Sample size	Margin of error	Kamala Harris Democratic	Donald Trump Republican	Robert F. Kennedy Jr. Independent	Other / Undecided
University of Rhode Island/YouGov	August 15 – September 8, 2024	500 (A)	± 6.0%	53%	27%	9%	11% (Note: "Another candidate" with 1%)

== South Carolina ==
Donald J. Trump vs. Kamala Harris

Poll source	Date(s) administered	Sample size	Margin of error	Donald Trump Republican	Kamala Harris Democratic	Other / Undecided
ActiVote	October 5–29, 2024	400 (LV)	± 4.9%	58.5%	41.5%	–
ActiVote	September 9 – October 17, 2024	400 (LV)	± 4.9%	58%	42%	–
Winthrop University	September 21–29, 2024	1,068 (LV)	± 3.0%	52%	42%	6% (Note: "Some other candidate" with 2%)

Donald J. Trump vs. Kamala Harris vs. Cornel West vs. Jill Stein vs. Chase Oliver

Poll source	Date(s) administered	Sample size	Margin of error	Donald J. Trump Republican	Kamala Harris Democratic	Cornel West Independent	Jill Stein Green	Chase Oliver Libertarian	Other / Undecided
The Citadel	October 17–25, 2024	1,241 (RV)	± 3.6%	53%	41%	0%	0%	0%	6%
The Citadel	October 17–25, 2024	1,136 (LV)	± 3.6%	54%	42%	0%	0%	0%	4%
East Carolina University	October 18–22, 2024	950 (LV)	± 3.0%	55%	42%	–	–	1%	2%

== South Dakota ==
Donald Trump vs. Kamala Harris

Poll source	Date(s) administered	Sample size	Margin of error	Donald Trump Republican	Kamala Harris Democratic	Other / Undecided
Emerson College	October 19–22, 2024	825 (LV)	± 3.3%	62%	35%	3%
Emerson College	October 19–22, 2024	825 (LV)	± 3.3%	62%	37%	1%

== Tennessee ==
Donald Trump vs. Kamala Harris

Poll source	Date(s) administered	Sample size	Margin of error	Donald Trump Republican	Kamala Harris Democratic	Other / Undecided
ActiVote	October 5−28, 2024	400 (LV)	± 4.9%	62%	38%	–
ActiVote	September 24 – October 16, 2024	400 (LV)	± 4.9%	62%	38%	–
ActiVote	July 26 – August 29, 2024	400 (LV)	± 4.9%	63%	37%	–

Donald Trump vs. Kamala Harris vs. Robert F. Kennedy Jr. vs. Cornel West vs. Jill Stein vs. Chase Oliver

Poll source	Date(s) administered	Sample size	Margin of error	Donald Trump Republican	Kamala Harris Democratic	Robert F. Kennedy Jr. Independent	Cornel West Independent	Jill Stein Green	Chase Oliver Libertarian	Other / Undecided
Targoz Market Research (Note: Poll sponsored by the Beacon Center of Tennessee)	September 27 – October 8, 2024	1,200 (RV)	± 2.8%	54%	35%	5%	–	1%	1%	4%
Targoz Market Research	September 27 – October 8, 2024	971 (LV)	± 2.8%	56%	35%	5%	–	0%	1%	3%

== Texas ==
Kamala Harris vs. Donald Trump Aggregate polls

Source of poll aggregation	Dates administered	Dates updated	Kamala Harris Democratic	Donald Trump Republican	Undecided (Note: Calculated by taking the difference of 100% and all other candidates combined.)	Margin
270ToWin	October 18 – November 3, 2024	November 3, 2024	44.4%	51.8%	3.8%	Trump +7.4%
538	through November 3, 2024	November 3, 2024	43.8%	51.7%	4.5%	Trump +7.9%
Silver Bulletin	through November 3, 2024	November 3, 2024	44.3%	51.4%	4.3%	Trump +7.1%
The Hill/DDHQ	through October 29, 2024	November 3, 2024	44.2%	51.8%	4.0%	Trump +7.6%
Average			44.2%	51.7%	4.1%	Trump +7.5%

Poll source	Date(s) administered	Sample size	Margin of error	Donald Trump Republican	Kamala Harris Democratic	Other / undecided
AtlasIntel	November 3–4, 2024	2,434 (LV)	± 2.0%	55%	44%	1%
Morning Consult	October 22−31, 2024	2,120 (LV)	± 2.0%	52%	45%	3%
ActiVote	October 21−27, 2024	400 (LV)	± 4.9%	55%	45%	–
New York Times/Siena College	October 23−26, 2024	1,180 (RV)	± 3.3%	52%	41%	7%
New York Times/Siena College	October 23−26, 2024	1,180 (LV)	± 3.3%	52%	42%	6%
Rasmussen Reports (R)	October 24–25, 2024	1,002 (LV)	± 3.0%	50%	44%	6%
CES/YouGov	October 1–25, 2024	6,526 (A)	–	51%	47%	2%
CES/YouGov	October 1–25, 2024	6,473 (LV)	–	51%	47%	2%
Emerson College	October 18−21, 2024	815 (LV)	± 3.4%	53%	46%	1%
Emerson College	October 18−21, 2024	815 (LV)	± 3.4%	53%	46%	1%
Rose Institute/YouGov	October 7–17, 2024	1,108 (RV)	± 3.5%	49%	44%	7%
Rose Institute/YouGov	October 7–17, 2024	1,108 (RV)	± 3.5%	50%	45%	5%
Rose Institute/YouGov	October 7–17, 2024	1,075 (LV)	± 3.5%	51%	46%	3%
ActiVote	September 26 − October 16, 2024	400 (LV)	± 4.9%	56%	44%	–
Morning Consult	October 6−15, 2024	2,048 (LV)	± 2.0%	50%	46%	4%
Marist College	October 3–7, 2024	1,365 (RV)	± 3.3%	52%	46%	2% (Note: "Another party's candidate" with 1%)
Marist College	October 3–7, 2024	1,186 (LV)	± 3.6%	53%	46%	1%
Mainstreet Research/Florida Atlantic University	October 2–6, 2024	811 (RV)	± 3.4%	50%	45%	5%
Mainstreet Research/Florida Atlantic University	October 2–6, 2024	775 (LV)	± 3.4%	50%	45%	5%
New York Times/Siena College	September 29 – October 6, 2024	617 (LV)	± 5.0%	50%	44%	6%
RMG Research	September 25–27, 2024	779 (LV)	± 3.5%	51%	45%	3% (Note: "Some other candidate" with 2%)
RMG Research	September 25–27, 2024	779 (LV)	± 3.5%	53%	46%	1%
Public Policy Polling (D)	September 25–26, 2024	759 (RV)	± 3.5%	51%	46%	3%
Emerson College	September 22−24, 2024	950 (LV)	± 3.1%	51%	46%	3%
Emerson College	September 22−24, 2024	950 (LV)	± 3.1%	52%	47%	1%
ActiVote	September 7−24, 2024	400 (LV)	± 4.9%	54%	46%	–
Morning Consult	September 9−18, 2024	2,716 (LV)	± 2.0%	50%	46%	4%
Morning Consult	August 30 – September 8, 2024	2,940 (LV)	± 2.0%	52%	43%	5%
Emerson College	September 3–5, 2024	845 (LV)	± 3.3%	50%	46%	4%
Emerson College	September 3–5, 2024	845 (LV)	± 3.3%	51%	48%	1% (Note: "Someone else")
YouGov (Note: Poll sponsored by the Texas Politics Project at the University of Texas)	August 23–31, 2024	1,200 (RV)	± 2.8%	49%	44%	7% (Note: "Someone else" with 3%)
ActiVote	August 14–31, 2024	400 (LV)	± 4.9%	54.5%	45.5%	–
Quantus Insights (R)	August 29–30, 2024	1,000 (RV)	± 3.1%	49%	42%	9% (Note: "Other candidate" with 3%)
Quantus Insights (R)	August 29–30, 2024	1,000 (RV)	± 3.1%	52%	44%	4% (Note: "Would not vote" with 4%)
	August 23, 2024	Robert F. Kennedy Jr. suspends his presidential campaign and endorses Donald Trump.				
Public Policy Polling (D)	August 21–22, 2024	725 (RV)	± 3.6%	49%	44%	6%
	August 19–22, 2024	Democratic National Convention				
ActiVote	July 31 – August 13, 2024	400 (LV)	± 4.9%	53%	47%	–
	August 6, 2024	Kamala Harris selects Gov. Tim Walz as her running mate.				
	July 21, 2024	Joe Biden announces his official withdrawal from the race; Kamala Harris declares her candidacy for president.				
	July 15–19, 2024	Republican National Convention				
	July 13, 2024	Attempted assassination of Donald Trump				
YouGov (Note: Poll sponsored by the Hobby School of Public Affairs at the University of Houston)	January 11–24, 2024	1,500 (RV)	± 2.5%	52%	39%	9%
Texas Hispanic Policy Foundation	May 8–17, 2023	1,000 (RV)	± 2.9%	46%	39%	15% (Note: "Don't know" with 9%; "Libertarian candidate" with 4%"; "Green Party candidate" with 2%")

Donald Trump vs. Kamala Harris vs. Cornel West vs. Jill Stein vs. Chase Oliver

Poll source	Date(s) administered	Sample size	Margin of error	Donald Trump Republican	Kamala Harris Democratic	Cornel West Independent	Jill Stein Green	Chase Oliver Libertarian	Other / undecided
AtlasIntel	November 3–4, 2024	2,434 (LV)	± 2.0%	54%	44%	−	1%	0%	1%
Cygnal (R)	October 26−28, 2024	600 (LV)	± 4.0%	51%	43%	−	2%	2%	2%
New York Times/Siena College	October 23−26, 2024	1,180 (RV)	± 3.3%	50%	40%	−	2%	2%	6%
New York Times/Siena College	October 23−26, 2024	1,180 (LV)	± 3.3%	51%	40%	−	1%	1%	7%
UT Tyler	October 14–21, 2024	1,129 (RV)	± 3.0%	51%	45%	–	1%	2%	1%
UT Tyler	October 14–21, 2024	956 (LV)	± 3.0%	51%	46%	–	1%	1%	1%
YouGov	October 2–10, 2024	1,091 (LV)	± 3.0%	51%	46%	–	2%	1%	–
CWS Research (R) (Note: Poll sponsored by Texans for Fiscal Responsibility)	October 1–4, 2024	533 (LV)	± 4.2%	48%	43%	–	2%	1%	6%
University of Houston	September 26 – October 10, 2024	1,329 (LV)	± 2.7%	51%	46%	–	1%	0%	2%
Public Policy Polling (D)	September 25–26, 2024	759 (RV)	± 3.5%	49%	44%	0%	1%	–	6%
Texas Hispanic Policy Foundation	September 13–18, 2024	1,200 (LV)	± 2.9%	50%	44%	–	1%	1%	4%
CWS Research (R) (Note: Poll sponsored by Texas Gun Rights)	September 4–9, 2024	504 (LV)	± 4.4%	51%	41%	–	0%	2%	6%
Texas Public Opinion Research/Lake Research Partners (D)	August 24–29, 2024	800 (RV)	± 3.5%	51%	43%	–	2%	2%	2%
YouGov	August 23–31, 2024	1,200 (RV)	± 2.8%	49%	44%	–	2%	0%	5%

== Utah ==
Donald Trump vs. Kamala Harris

Poll source	Date(s) administered	Sample size	Margin of error	Donald Trump Republican	Kamala Harris Democratic	Other / Undecided
ActiVote	October 7–30, 2024	400 (LV)	± 4.9%	60%	40%	–
Noble Predictive Insights	October 2–7, 2024	600 (RV)	± 4.0%	52%	39%	9%
Noble Predictive Insights	October 2–7, 2024	539 (LV)	± 4.2%	54%	38%	8%
Public Policy Polling (D) (Note: Poll sponsored by the campaign of Brian King, the Democratic nominee for Utah's gubernatorial election)	September 27–28, 2024	612 (LV)	± 4.0%	54%	39%	7%

Donald Trump vs. Kamala Harris vs. Cornel West vs. Jill Stein vs. Chase Oliver

Poll source	Date(s) administered	Sample size	Margin of error	Donald Trump Republican	Kamala Harris Democratic	Cornel West Independent	Jill Stein Green	Chase Oliver Libertarian	Other / Undecided
Noble Predictive Insights	October 25–28, 2024	695 (LV)	± 3.7%	54%	34%	0%	0%	1%	11% (Note: Joel Skousen (C) and Claudia De la Cruz (PSL) with 1% each)
Deseret News/Hinckley Institute of Politics	October 15–19, 2024	813 (RV)	± 3.4%	61%	30%	2%	1%	–	6%
Deseret News/Hinckley Institute of Politics	October 15–19, 2024	813 (RV)	± 3.4%	63%	31%	4%	2%	–	–
Noble Predictive Insights	October 2–7, 2024	600 (RV)	± 4.0%	51%	37%	2%	1%	1%	8%
Noble Predictive Insights	October 2–7, 2024	539 (LV)	± 4.2%	54%	36%	2%	0%	2%	6%

== Vermont ==
Kamala Harris vs. Donald Trump

Poll source	Date(s) administered	Sample size	Margin of error	Kamala Harris Democratic	Donald Trump Republican	Other / Undecided
	August 23, 2024	Robert F. Kennedy Jr. suspends his presidential campaign and endorses Donald Trump.				
	August 22, 2024	Democratic National Convention concludes				
University of New Hampshire	August 15–19, 2024	924 (LV)	± 3.2%	70%	29%	1%
	August 19, 2024	Democratic National Convention begins				

Kamala Harris vs. Donald Trump vs. Robert F. Kennedy Jr. vs Cornel West vs. Jill Stein vs. Chase Oliver

Poll source	Date(s) administered	Sample size	Margin of error	Kamala Harris Democratic	Donald Trump Republican	Robert Kennedy Jr Independent	Cornel West Independent	Jill Stein Green	Chase Oliver Libertarian	Other / Undecided
University of New Hampshire	October 29 – November 2, 2024	1,167 (LV)	± 2.9%	63%	31%	2%	0%	–	0%	4% (Note: Claudia De la Cruz (PSL) with 2%; "Another Candidate" with 1%)
University of New Hampshire	August 15–19, 2024	924 (LV)	± 3.2%	67%	27%	3%	0%	–	0%	3% (Note: "Another candidate" with 1%)

== Virginia ==
Kamala Harris vs. Donald Trump

Aggregate polls

Source of poll aggregation	Dates administered	Dates updated	Kamala Harris Democratic	Donald Trump Republican	Undecided (Note: Calculated by taking the difference of 100% and all other candidates combined.)	Margin
270ToWin	October 2 - November 1, 2024	November 4, 2024	49.8%	41.0%	9.2%	Harris +8.8%
538	through November 4, 2024	November 4, 2024	49.9%	43.7%	6.4%	Harris +6.2%
Silver Bulletin	through November 3, 2024	November 3, 2024	49.5%	43.2%	7.3%	Harris +6.3%
The Hill/DDHQ	through November 4, 2024	November 4, 2024	50.1%	45.1%	4.8%	Harris +5.0%
Average			49.8%	43.3%	6.9%	Harris +6.5%

Poll source	Date(s) administered	Sample size	Margin of error	Kamala Harris Democratic	Donald Trump Republican	Other / Undecided
AtlasIntel	November 3–4, 2024	2,202 (LV)	± 2.0%	51%	46%	3%
Research Co.	November 2–3, 2024	450 (LV)	± 4.6%	51%	45%	4%
ActiVote	October 2–28, 2024	400 (LV)	± 4.9%	54%	46%	–
Rasmussen Reports (R)	October 24–25, 2024	1,014 (LV)	± 3.0%	48%	46%	6%
CES/YouGov	October 1–25, 2024	2,027 (A)	–	53%	44%	3%
CES/YouGov	October 1–25, 2024	2,015 (LV)	–	53%	44%	3%
Quantus Insights (R)	October 22−24, 2024	725 (LV)	± 3.6%	49%	48%	3%
Braun Research (Note: Poll sponsored by The Washington Post & the Schar School of Policy and Government)	October 19−23, 2024	1,004 (RV)	± 3.5%	48%	42%	9%
Braun Research	October 19−23, 2024	1,004 (LV)	± 3.5%	49%	43%	8%
Christopher Newport University	September 28 − October 4, 2024	800 (LV)	± 4.4%	52%	41%	7%
Emerson College (Note: Poll sponsored by WAVY-TV, WRIC-TV, WFXR-TV, & WDCW-TV)	September 22−24, 2024	860 (LV)	± 3.3%	52%	44%	4%
Emerson College	September 22−24, 2024	860 (LV)	± 3.3%	53%	46%	1%
Morning Consult	September 9−18, 2024	899 (LV)	± 3.0%	51%	44%	5%
Rasmussen Reports (R)	September 19−22, 2024	1,144 (LV)	± 3.0%	49%	46%	5%
ActiVote	August 19 – September 17, 2024	400 (LV)	± 4.9%	55%	45%	–
Research America Inc. (Note: Poll sponsored by the Center for Leadership and Media Studies at the University of Mary Washington)	September 3−9, 2024	1,000 (A)	± 3.1%	45%	45%	10% (Note: "Other candidate" with 3%; "None/Would not vote" with 2%; "Refused" with 1%)
Research America Inc.	September 3−9, 2024	756 (LV)	± 4.1%	48%	46%	6% (Note: "Other candidate" with 3%; "Refused" with 1%)
Washington Post/Schar School	September 4–8, 2024	1,005 (RV)	± 3.5%	51%	43%	6%
Washington Post/Schar School	September 4–8, 2024	1,005 (LV)	± 3.5%	51%	43%	6%
Morning Consult	August 30 – September 8, 2024	873 (LV)	± 3.0%	52%	42%	6%
	August 23, 2024	Robert F. Kennedy Jr. suspends his presidential campaign and endorses Donald Trump.				
Quantus Insights (R)	August 20–22, 2024	629 (RV)	± 4.0%	47%	44%	9%
	August 19–22, 2024	Democratic National Convention				
Roanoke College	August 12–16, 2024	691 (LV)	± 4.5%	47%	44%	10% (Note: "Someone else" with 8%. "Refused" and "Undecided" with 1% each)
	August 6, 2024	Kamala Harris selects Gov. Tim Walz as her running mate.				
	July 21, 2024	Joe Biden announces his official withdrawal from the race; Kamala Harris declares her candidacy for president.				
	July 15–19, 2024	Republican National Convention				
Emerson College	July 14–15, 2024	1,000 (RV)	± 3.0%	45%	47%	8%
Mainstreet Research/Florida Atlantic University	July 14–15, 2024	301 (RV)	–	43%	44%	13% (Note: "Another candidate" with 5%)
Mainstreet Research/Florida Atlantic University	July 14–15, 2024	265 (LV)	–	43%	47%	10%
	July 13, 2024	attempted assassination of Donald Trump				
Mainstreet Research/Florida Atlantic University	July 12–13, 2024	617 (RV)	± 3.9%	45%	41%	14%
Mainstreet Research/Florida Atlantic University	July 12–13, 2024	544 (LV)	± 3.9%	46%	42%	12%
New York Times/Siena College	July 9–12, 2024	661 (RV)	± 4.2%	48%	44%	8%
New York Times/Siena College	July 9–12, 2024	661 (LV)	± 4.4%	49%	44%	7%
SoCal Strategies (R)	July 6–11, 2024	1,000 (RV)	± 2.1%	47%	47%	6%

Kamala Harris vs. Donald Trump vs Cornel West vs. Jill Stein vs. Chase Oliver

Poll source	Date(s) administered	Sample size	Margin of error	Kamala Harris Democratic	Donald Trump Republican	Cornel West Independent	Jill Stein Green	Chase Oliver Libertarian	Other / Undecided
AtlasIntel	November 3–4, 2024	2,202 (LV)	± 2.0%	51%	45%	–	2%	1%	1%
Chism Strategies	October 28–30, 2024	520 (LV)	± 4.3%	45.2%	44.5%	–	1.3%	0.6%	8.4% (Note: "Someone else" with 1.6%)
Cygnal (R)	October 27–29, 2024	400 (LV)	± 4.0%	50%	43%	1%	1%	0%	5% (Note: Claudia De La Cruz (PSL) with 0%)
Roanoke College	October 25–29, 2024	851 (LV)	± 4.6%	51%	41%	2%	1%	2%	3% (Note: "Some other candidate" with 2%)
Virginia Commonwealth University	September 16–25, 2024	832 (A)	± 4.6%	43%	37%	3%	1%	–	16% (Note: "Wouldn't vote" with 4%; "Refused" with 3%; "Someone else" with 1%)
Virginia Commonwealth University	September 16–25, 2024	762 (RV)	± 4.6%	47%	37%	2%	1%	–	13% (Note: "Refused" with 3%; "Wouldn't vote" with 2%; "Someone else" with 1%)
Washington Post/Schar School	September 4–8, 2024	1,005 (RV)	± 3.5%	49%	42%	0%	1%	1%	7% (Note: Claudia De la Cruz (PSL) with 1%; "Would not vote" with 1%)
Washington Post/Schar School	September 4–8, 2024	1,005 (LV)	± 3.5%	50%	42%	0%	1%	1%	6%
Virginia Commonwealth University	August 26 – September 6, 2024	809 (A)	± 5.0%	46%	36%	2%	1%	–	15% (Note: "Wouldn't vote" with 6%; "Refused" with 2%; "Someone else" with 1%)
Virginia Commonwealth University	August 26 – September 6, 2024	749 (RV)	± 5.0%	49%	36%	1%	1%	–	13% (Note: "Wouldn't vote" with 3%; "Refused" with 2%; "Someone else" with 1%)

== Washington ==
Kamala Harris vs. Donald Trump

Poll source	Date(s) administered	Sample size	Margin of error	Kamala Harris Democratic	Donald Trump Republican	Other / Undecided
Research Co.	November 2–3, 2024	450 (LV)	± 4.6%	54%	39%	7%
ActiVote	October 3–29, 2024	400 (LV)	± 4.9%	59%	41%	–
Public Policy Polling (D)	October 16–17, 2024	571 (LV)	± 4.1%	55%	40%	6%
Strategies 360 (Note: Poll sponsored by KOMO-TV)	October 11–16, 2024	600 (RV)	± 4.0%	55%	39%	6%
SurveyUSA (Note: Poll sponsored by The Seattle Times, KING-TV, & University of Washington Information School)	October 9–14, 2024	703 (LV)	± 4.9%	57%	35%	8%
ActiVote	September 7 – October 13, 2024	400 (LV)	± 4.9%	60%	40%	–
Elway Research (Note: Poll sponsored by Crosscut.com)	October 8–12, 2024	401 (RV)	± 5.0%	57%	32%	11%
Elway Research	September 3–6, 2024	403 (RV)	± 5.0%	53%	32%	11%
	July 21, 2024	Joe Biden announces his withdrawal from the race; Kamala Harris declares her candidacy for president.				
DHM Research	July 12–17, 2024	500 (RV)	± 4.4%	45%	40%	14% (Note: "Someone else" with 9%)
SurveyUSA	July 10–13, 2024	708 (LV)	± 5.0%	51%	36%	13%

Kamala Harris vs. Donald Trump vs Robert F. Kennedy Jr.

Poll source	Date(s) administered	Sample size	Margin of error	Kamala Harris Democratic	Donald Trump Republican	Robert F. Kennedy Jr. Independent	Other / Undecided
Public Policy Polling (D)	July 24–25, 2024	581 (LV)	± 4.0%	52%	38%	6%	4%

== West Virginia ==
Donald Trump vs. Kamala Harris

Poll source	Date(s) administered	Sample size	Margin of error	Donald Trump Republican	Kamala Harris Democratic	Other / Undecided
Research America (Note: Poll sponsored by West Virginia MetroNews)	August 21–27, 2024	400 (RV)	± 4.9%	61%	34%	5%

== Wisconsin ==
Kamala Harris vs. Donald Trump

Aggregate polls

Source of poll aggregation	Dates administered	Dates updated	Kamala Harris Democratic	Donald Trump Republican	Other / Undecided (Note: Calculated by taking the difference of 100% and all other candidates combined.)	Margin
270ToWin	October 23 – November 4, 2024	November 4, 2024	48.8%	47.7%	3.5%	Harris +1.1%
538	through November 4, 2024	November 4, 2024	48.3%	47.3%	4.4%	Harris +1.0%
Silver Bulletin	through November 4, 2024	November 4, 2024	48.7%	47.7%	3.6%	Harris +1.0%
The Hill/DDHQ	through November 4, 2024	November 4, 2024	48.4%	48.7%	2.9%	Trump +0.3%
Average			48.6%	47.9%	3.5%	Harris +0.7%

Poll source	Date(s) administered	Sample size	Margin of error	Kamala Harris Democratic	Donald Trump Republican	Other / Undecided
HarrisX	November 3–5, 2024	1,727 (RV)	± 2.4%	47%	46%	7%
HarrisX	November 3–5, 2024	1,727 (RV)	± 2.4%	51%	49%	–
HarrisX	November 3–5, 2024	1,549 (LV)	± 2.4%	49%	47%	4%
HarrisX	November 3–5, 2024	1,549 (LV)	± 2.4%	51%	49%	–
AtlasIntel	November 3–4, 2024	869 (LV)	± 3.0%	49%	50%	1%
Research Co.	November 2–3, 2024	450 (LV)	± 4.6%	49%	46%	5%
Trafalgar Group (R)	November 1–3, 2024	1,086 (LV)	± 2.9%	48%	47%	5%
Patriot Polling	November 1–3, 2024	835 (RV)	± 3.0%	49%	49%	2%
InsiderAdvantage (R)	November 1–2, 2024	800 (LV)	± 3.4%	48%	49%	3%
AtlasIntel	November 1–2, 2024	728 (LV)	± 4.0%	49%	50%	1%
Emerson College	October 30 – November 2, 2024	800 (LV)	± 3.4%	49%	49%	2%
Emerson College	October 30 – November 2, 2024	800 (LV)	± 3.4%	50%	50%	–
Mainstreet Research/Florida Atlantic University	October 25 – November 2, 2024	798 (RV)	± 3.5%	49%	48%	3% (Note: "Another Candidate" with 1%)
Mainstreet Research/Florida Atlantic University	October 25 – November 2, 2024	786 (LV)	± 3.5%	49%	48%	3%
The New York Times/Siena College	October 25 – November 2, 2024	1,305 (RV)	± 3.5%	49%	47%	4%
The New York Times/Siena College	October 25 – November 2, 2024	1,305 (LV)	± 3.5%	49%	47%	4%
ActiVote	October 10 – November 1, 2024	400 (LV)	± 4.9%	51%	49%	–
AtlasIntel	October 30–31, 2024	673 (LV)	± 4.0%	49%	49%	2%
OnMessage Inc. (R)	October 29–31, 2024	800 (LV)	–	47%	48%	5%
YouGov	October 25–31, 2024	889 (RV)	± 4.5%	51%	47%	2%
YouGov	October 25–31, 2024	876 (LV)	± 4.5%	51%	47%	2%
Morning Consult	October 22−31, 2024	540 (LV)	± 4.0%	48%	49%	3%
TIPP Insights	October 28–30, 2024	1,038 (RV)	± 3.5%	48%	46%	6%
TIPP Insights	October 28–30, 2024	831 (LV)	± 3.5%	48%	48%	4%
Marist College	October 27–30, 2024	1,444 (RV)	± 3.3%	50%	48%	2% (Note: "Another Party's Candidate" with 1%)
Marist College	October 27–30, 2024	1,330 (LV)	± 3.4%	50%	48%	2%
Echelon Insights	October 27–30, 2024	600 (LV)	± 4.5%	49%	49%	2%
Quantus Insights (R) (Note: Poll sponsored by Trending Politics)	October 28–29, 2024	637 (LV)	± 3.8%	49%	49%	2%
SoCal Strategies (R)	October 28–29, 2024	600 (LV)	± 4.0%	49%	49%	2%
Rasmussen Reports (R)	October 25–29, 2024	818 (LV)	± 3.0%	47%	50%	3%
AtlasIntel	October 25–29, 2024	1,470 (LV)	± 3.0%	49%	49%	2%
CNN/SSRS	October 23–28, 2024	736 (LV)	± 4.8%	51%	45%	4%
InsiderAdvantage (R)	October 26–27, 2024	800 (LV)	± 3.5%	48%	49%	3%
CES/YouGov	October 1–25, 2024	1,552 (A)	–	51%	46%	3%
CES/YouGov	October 1–25, 2024	1,542 (LV)	–	50%	47%	3%
Marquette University Law School	October 16–24, 2024	834 (RV)	± 4.4%	48%	46%	6%
Marquette University Law School	October 16–24, 2024	834 (RV)	± 4.4%	51%	49%	–
Marquette University Law School	October 16–24, 2024	753 (LV)	± 4.4%	48%	47%	5%
Marquette University Law School	October 16–24, 2024	753 (LV)	± 4.4%	50%	49%	1%
Emerson College (Note: Poll sponsored by RealClearWorld)	October 21–22, 2024	800 (LV)	± 3.4%	48%	49%	3%
Emerson College	October 21–22, 2024	800 (LV)	± 3.4%	49%	50%	1%
Quinnipiac University	October 17–21, 2024	1,108 (LV)	± 2.9%	48%	48%	4%
Trafalgar Group (R)	October 18−20, 2024	1,083 (LV)	± 2.9%	47%	47%	6%
Bloomberg/Morning Consult	October 16–20, 2024	635 (RV)	± 4.0%	48%	48%	4%
Bloomberg/Morning Consult	October 16–20, 2024	624 (LV)	± 4.0%	48%	48%	4%
The Bullfinch Group	October 11−18, 2024	600 (LV)	± 4.0%	50%	47%	3%
The Bullfinch Group	October 11−18, 2024	600 (LV)	± 4.0%	48%	46%	7% (Note: "A third party / Independent candidate" with 4%)
AtlasIntel	October 12–17, 2024	932 (LV)	± 3.0%	49%	48%	3%
RMG Research	October 10−16, 2024	787 (LV)	± 3.5%	48%	49%	3% (Note: "Some other candidate" with 2%)
RMG Research	October 10−16, 2024	787 (LV)	± 3.5%	49%	50%	1%
Morning Consult	October 6−15, 2024	527 (LV)	± 4.0%	47%	48%	5%
The Washington Post/Schar School	September 30 – October 15, 2024	695 (RV)	± 4.6%	50%	46%	4%
The Washington Post/Schar School	September 30 – October 15, 2024	695 (LV)	± 4.6%	50%	47%	3%
Patriot Polling	October 12–14, 2024	803 (RV)	± 3.0%	49%	50%	1%
Rasmussen Reports (R)	October 9–14, 2024	1,004 (LV)	± 3.0%	47%	49%	4%
InsiderAdvantage (R)	October 8–9, 2024	800 (LV)	± 3.7%	48%	48%	4%
Fabrizio, Lee & Associates (R)/McLaughlin & Associates (R)	October 6–9, 2024	800 (LV)	± 3.5%	48%	49%	3%
Emerson College	October 5–8, 2024	1,000 (LV)	± 3.0%	49%	49%	2%
Emerson College	October 5–8, 2024	1,000 (LV)	± 3.0%	49%	50%	1%
The Wall Street Journal	September 28 – October 8, 2024	600 (RV)	± 5.0%	48%	48%	4%
Research Co.	October 5–7, 2024	450 (LV)	± 4.6%	47%	45%	8%
Research Co.	October 5–7, 2024	450 (LV)	± 4.6%	50%	48%	2%
Quinnipiac University	October 3–7, 2024	1,073 (LV)	± 3.0%	47%	49%	4%
Arc Insights (Note: Poll sponsored by Fields of Freedom Alliance)	October 2–6, 2024	700 (LV)	± 3.7%	47%	48%	5%
OnMessage Inc. (R)	September 24 – October 2, 2024	500 (LV)	± 4.4%	46%	47%	7%
Trafalgar Group (R)	September 28–30, 2024	1,079 (LV)	± 2.9%	46%	47%	7%
Global Strategy Group (D)/North Star Opinion Research (R)	September 23–29, 2024	408 (LV)	± 4.9%	48%	46%	6%
ActiVote	August 29 – September 29, 2024	400 (LV)	± 4.9%	52%	48%	–
The New York Times/Siena College	September 21–26, 2024	680 (RV)	± 4.0%	49%	47%	4%
The New York Times/Siena College	September 21–26, 2024	680 (LV)	± 4.0%	49%	47%	4%
Marquette University Law School	September 18–26, 2024	882 (RV)	± 4.4%	50%	45%	5%
Marquette University Law School	September 18–26, 2024	882 (RV)	± 4.4%	52%	48%	–
Marquette University Law School	September 18–26, 2024	798 (LV)	± 4.4%	50%	45%	5%
Marquette University Law School	September 18–26, 2024	798 (LV)	± 4.4%	52%	48%	–
AtlasIntel	September 20–25, 2024	1,077 (LV)	± 3.0%	48%	50%	2%
Cook Political Report/BSG (R)/GS Strategy Group (D)	September 19–25, 2024	411 (LV)	–	49%	47%	4%
Bloomberg/Morning Consult	September 19–25, 2024	849 (RV)	± 3.0%	50%	48%	2%
Bloomberg/Morning Consult	September 19–25, 2024	785 (LV)	± 3.0%	51%	48%	1%
Rodriguez Gudelunas Strategies (Note: Poll sponsored by Focus on Rural America)	September 19–23, 2024	400 (LV)	–	51%	45%	4%
RMG Research	September 17–23, 2024	788 (LV)	± 3.5%	50%	49%	1%
Rasmussen Reports (R)	September 19−22, 2024	1,071 (LV)	± 3.0%	49%	49%	1%
Emerson College	September 15–18, 2024	1,000 (LV)	± 3.0%	48%	49%	3%
Emerson College	September 15–18, 2024	1,000 (LV)	± 3.0%	49%	50%	1%
MassINC Polling Group (Note: Poll sponsored by Wisconsin Watch)	September 12−18, 2024	800 (LV)	± 3.8%	53%	46%	1%
Morning Consult	September 9−18, 2024	600 (LV)	± 4.0%	50%	44%	6%
Marist College	September 12−17, 2024	1,312 (RV)	± 3.5%	50%	47%	3% (Note: "Another Party's Candidate" with 2%)
Marist College	September 12−17, 2024	1,194 (LV)	± 3.6%	50%	49%	1%
Quinnipiac University	September 12–16, 2024	1,075 (LV)	± 3.0%	49%	48%	3%
Fabrizio Ward (R)/Impact Research (D)	September 11–14, 2024	600 (LV)	± 4.0%	49%	48%	3%
InsiderAdvantage (R)	September 11–12, 2024	800 (LV)	± 3.5%	49%	47%	4%
Morning Consult	August 30 – September 8, 2024	638 (LV)	± 4.0%	49%	46%	5%
co/efficient (R)	September 4–6, 2024	917 (LV)	± 3.2%	47%	47%	6%
CBS News/YouGov	September 3–6, 2024	946 (LV)	± 4.0%	51%	49%	–
Marquette University Law School	August 28 – September 5, 2024	822 (RV)	± 4.6%	49%	45%	6%
Marquette University Law School	August 28 – September 5, 2024	822 (RV)	± 4.6%	52%	48%	–
Marquette University Law School	August 28 – September 5, 2024	738 (LV)	± 4.7%	49%	44%	7%
Marquette University Law School	August 28 – September 5, 2024	738 (LV)	± 4.7%	52%	48%	–
Patriot Polling	September 1–3, 2024	826 (RV)	–	48%	48%	4%
Trafalgar Group (R)	August 28–30, 2024	1,083 (LV)	± 2.9%	46%	47%	7%
Emerson College	August 25–28, 2024	850 (LV)	± 3.3%	48%	49%	3%
Emerson College	August 25–28, 2024	850 (LV)	± 3.3%	49%	50%	1%
Bloomberg/Morning Consult	August 23–26, 2024	648 (LV)	± 4.0%	53%	44%	3%
Bloomberg/Morning Consult	August 23–26, 2024	701 (RV)	± 4.0%	52%	44%	4%
	August 23, 2024	Robert F. Kennedy Jr. suspends his presidential campaign and endorses Donald Trump.				
YouGov	August 15–23, 2024	500 (A)	± 5.3%	48%	42%	10% (Note: "Will not vote" with 4%)
YouGov	August 15–23, 2024	– (LV)	± 5.9%	51%	46%	3%
	August 19–22, 2024	Democratic National Convention				
BK Strategies (Note: Poll sponsored by Platform Communications)	August 19–21, 2024	600 (LV)	–	48%	45%	7%
Fabrizio Ward (R)	August 19–21, 2024	400 (LV)	± 4.9%	49%	45%	6%
Spry Strategies (R)	August 14–20, 2024	600 (LV)	± 4.0%	48%	45%	7%
Rasmussen Reports (R)	August 13–19, 2024	1,099 (LV)	± 3.0%	48%	47%	5%
Focaldata	August 6–16, 2024	700 (LV)	± 3.7%	52%	48%	–
Quantus Insights (R)	August 14–15, 2024	601 (RV)	± 4.0%	46%	45%	9%
TIPP Insights	August 12–14, 2024	1,015 (RV)	± 3.4%	47%	46%	7%
TIPP Insights	August 12–14, 2024	976 (LV)	± 3.4%	47%	47%	6%
The Bullfinch Group	August 8–11, 2024	500 (RV)	± 4.4%	51%	42%	7%
InsiderAdvantage (R)	August 6–8, 2024	800 (LV)	–	48%	49%	3%
Navigator Research (D)	July 31 – August 8, 2024	600 (LV)	± 4.0%	48%	48%	4%
Cook Political Report/BSG (R)/GS Strategy Group (D)	July 26 – August 8, 2024	404 (LV)	–	49%	46%	5%
The New York Times/Siena College	August 5–8, 2024	661 (RV)	± 4.3%	50%	46%	4%
The New York Times/Siena College	August 5–8, 2024	661 (LV)	± 4.3%	50%	46%	3%
	August 6, 2024	Kamala Harris selects Gov. Tim Walz as her running mate.				
RMG Research	July 31 – August 5, 2024	800 (RV)	± 3.5%	48%	45%	7%
Marquette University Law School	July 24 – August 1, 2024	877 (RV)	± 4.6%	47%	44%	9%
Marquette University Law School	July 24 – August 1, 2024	877 (RV)	± 4.6%	49%	50%	1%
Marquette University Law School	July 24 – August 1, 2024	801 (LV)	± 4.8%	49%	45%	6%
Marquette University Law School	July 24 – August 1, 2024	801 (LV)	± 4.8%	50%	49%	1%
Public Opinion Strategies (R)	July 23–29, 2024	400 (LV)	± 4.9%	48%	46%	6%
Bloomberg/Morning Consult	July 24–28, 2024	700 (RV)	± 4.0%	49%	47%	4%
Fox News	July 22–24, 2024	1,046 (RV)	± 3.0%	49%	50%	1%
Emerson College	July 22–23, 2024	845 (RV)	± 3.3%	47%	47%	6%
Emerson College	July 22–23, 2024	845 (RV)	± 3.3%	51%	49%	–
	July 21, 2024	Joe Biden announces his withdrawal from the race; Kamala Harris declares her candidacy for president.				
	July 15–19, 2024	Republican National Convention				
	July 13, 2024	Attempted assassination of Donald Trump				
Public Policy Polling (D)	July 10–11, 2024	548 (RV)	–	48%	49%	3%
North Star Opinion Research (R)	July 6–10, 2024	600 (LV)	± 4.0%	47%	48%	5%
Bloomberg/Morning Consult	May 7–13, 2024	693 (RV)	± 4.0%	41%	49%	10%
Emerson College	February 20–24, 2024	1,000 (RV)	± 3.0%	44%	47%	9%
The New York Times/Siena College	October 22 – November 3, 2023	603 (RV)	± 4.8%	46%	47%	7%
The New York Times/Siena College	October 22 – November 3, 2023	603 (LV)	± 4.8%	46%	48%	6%

Kamala Harris vs. Donald Trump vs. Cornel West vs. Jill Stein vs. Chase Oliver

Poll source	Date(s) administered	Sample size	Margin of error	Kamala Harris Democratic	Donald Trump Republican	Cornel West Independent	Jill Stein Green	Chase Oliver Libertarian	Other / Undecided
HarrisX	November 3–5, 2024	1,727 (RV)	± 2.4%	45%	45%	2%	1%	–	7%
HarrisX	November 3–5, 2024	1,727 (RV)	± 2.4%	48.0%	47.9%	2.6%	1.4%	–	–
HarrisX	November 3–5, 2024	1,549 (LV)	± 2.4%	47%	47%	2%	1%	–	3%
HarrisX	November 3–5, 2024	1,549 (LV)	± 2.4%	48.1%	48.5%	2.1%	1.3%	–	–
AtlasIntel	November 3–4, 2024	869 (LV)	± 3.0%	48%	49%	–	1%	0%	1%
AtlasIntel	November 1–2, 2024	728 (LV)	± 4.0%	48%	49%	–	1%	0%	2%
The New York Times/Siena College	October 25 – November 2, 2024	1,305 (RV)	± 3.5%	48%	45%	0%	2%	0%	5%
The New York Times/Siena College	October 25 – November 2, 2024	1,305 (LV)	± 3.5%	48%	45%	0%	1%	0%	6%
Focaldata	October 3 – November 1, 2024	1,799 (LV)	–	50%	47%	–	0%	1%	2%
Focaldata	October 3 – November 1, 2024	1,613 (RV)	± 2.3%	51%	46%	–	1%	1%	1%
Focaldata	October 3 – November 1, 2024	1,799 (A)	–	49%	46%	–	1%	1%	3%
AtlasIntel	October 30–31, 2024	673 (LV)	± 4.0%	48%	49%	–	1%	0%	2%
Redfield & Wilton Strategies	October 28–31, 2024	932 (LV)	–	48%	47%	–	0%	1%	4%
YouGov	October 25–31, 2024	889 (RV)	± 4.5%	48%	45%	0%	3%	–	4%
YouGov	October 25–31, 2024	876 (LV)	± 4.5%	49%	45%	0%	2%	–	4%
AtlasIntel	October 25–29, 2024	1,470 (LV)	± 3.0%	48%	49%	–	1%	1%	1%
Redfield & Wilton Strategies	October 25–27, 2024	746 (LV)	–	49%	47%	–	0%	1%	3%
Redfield & Wilton Strategies	October 20–22, 2024	557 (LV)	–	49%	47%	–	0%	1%	3%
OnMessage Inc. (R)	October 19–22, 2024	600 (LV)	± 4.0%	47%	48%	–	0%	1%	4%
Quinnipiac University	October 17–21, 2024	1,108 (LV)	± 2.9%	48%	48%	0%	0%	0%	4% (Note: Randall Terry (C) & Claudia De la Cruz (PSL) with 0% each)
Bloomberg/Morning Consult	October 16–20, 2024	635 (RV)	± 4.0%	47%	47%	–	1%	3%	2%
Bloomberg/Morning Consult	October 16–20, 2024	624 (LV)	± 4.0%	47%	47%	–	1%	3%	2%
Redfield & Wilton Strategies	October 16–18, 2024	622 (LV)	–	47%	46%	–	0%	1%	6%
Redfield & Wilton Strategies	October 12–14, 2024	641 (LV)	–	48%	47%	–	1%	1%	3%
Quinnipiac University	October 3–7, 2024	1,073 (LV)	± 3.0%	46%	48%	0%	1%	1%	4%
Redfield & Wilton Strategies	September 27 – October 2, 2024	533 (LV)	–	47%	46%	–	0%	1%	6%
The New York Times/Siena College	September 21–26, 2024	680 (RV)	± 4.0%	48%	45%	–	1%	2%	4%
The New York Times/Siena College	September 21–26, 2024	680 (LV)	± 4.0%	48%	46%	–	1%	2%	3%
Bloomberg/Morning Consult	September 19–25, 2024	849 (RV)	± 3.0%	49%	47%	–	1%	2%	1%
Bloomberg/Morning Consult	September 19–25, 2024	785 (LV)	± 3.0%	50%	47%	–	0%	1%	2%
Remington Research Group (R)	September 16–20, 2024	800 (LV)	± 3.5%	48%	48%	1%	0%	–	3%
Redfield & Wilton Strategies	September 16–19, 2024	600 (LV)	–	47%	47%	–	0%	0%	6%
Quinnipiac University	September 12–16, 2024	1,075 (LV)	± 3.0%	48%	47%	0%	1%	1%	3%
Redfield & Wilton Strategies	September 6–9, 2024	626 (LV)	–	49%	46%	–	0%	1%	4%
YouGov	August 23 – September 3, 2024	900 (RV)	± 4.1%	47%	44%	1%	1%	–	7%
CNN/SSRS	August 23–29, 2024	976 (LV)	± 4.4%	50%	44%	0%	2%	2%	2%
Redfield & Wilton Strategies	August 25–28, 2024	672 (LV)	–	48%	44%	–	0%	0%	8%
Bloomberg/Morning Consult	August 23–26, 2024	648 (LV)	± 4.0%	52%	44%	–	1%	1%	2%
Bloomberg/Morning Consult	August 23–26, 2024	701 (RV)	± 4.0%	51%	44%	–	1%	1%	3%

Kamala Harris vs. Donald Trump vs. Robert F. Kennedy Jr. vs. Cornel West vs. Jill Stein vs. Chase Oliver

Aggregate polls

Source of poll aggregation	Dates administered	Dates updated	Kamala Harris Democratic	Donald Trump Republican	Robert F. Kennedy Jr. (Note: Kennedy suspended his campaign, but he remains on the ballot in Wisconsin.) Independent	Jill Stein Green	Cornel West Independent	Chase Oliver Libertarian	Others/ Undecided	Margin
Race to the WH	through October 7, 2024	October 13, 2024	47.7%	46.3%	1.5%	0.9%	0.2%	1.1%	2.3%	Harris +1.4%
270toWin	October 2 – 11, 2024	October 11, 2024	47.0%	45.7%	2.5%	0.3%	0.6%	0.8%	3.1%	Harris +1.3%
Average			47.4%	46.0%	2.0%	0.6%	0.4%	1.0%	2.6%	Harris +1.4%

Poll source	Date(s) administered	Sample size	Margin of error	Kamala Harris Democratic	Donald Trump Republican	Robert Kennedy Jr Independent	Cornel West Independent	Jill Stein Green	Chase Oliver Libertarian	Other / Undecided
TIPP Insights	October 28–30, 2024	1,038 (RV)	± 3.5%	46%	44%	3%	1%	1%	–	5%
TIPP Insights	October 28–30, 2024	831 (LV)	± 3.5%	48%	47%	3%	1%	1%	–	–
Echelon Insights	October 27–30, 2024	600 (LV)	± 4.5%	48%	48%	0%	0%	1%	0%	3%
CNN/SSRS	October 23–28, 2024	736 (LV)	± 4.8%	51%	45%	1%	0%	1%	0%	2%
Marquette University Law School	October 16–24, 2024	834 (RV)	± 4.4%	46%	43%	5%	1%	1%	2%	2%
Marquette University Law School	October 16–24, 2024	753 (LV)	± 4.4%	46%	44%	5%	1%	1%	2%	1%
USA Today/Suffolk University	October 20–23, 2024	500 (LV)	± 4.4%	47%	48%	1%	0%	1%	0%	3%
AtlasIntel	October 12–17, 2024	932 (LV)	± 3.0%	49%	48%	1%	–	0%	1%	1%
The Wall Street Journal	September 28 – October 8, 2024	600 (RV)	± 5.0%	46%	45%	3%	1%	0%	0%	5%
Global Strategy Group (D)/North Star Opinion Research (R)	September 23–29, 2024	408 (LV)	± 4.9%	46%	45%	2%	1%	0%	1%	5%
Marquette University Law School	September 18–26, 2024	882 (RV)	± 4.4%	48%	44%	3%	0%	1%	1%	3% (Note: Randall Terry (C) with 1%; Claudia De la Cruz (PSL) with 0%)
Marquette University Law School	September 18–26, 2024	798 (LV)	± 4.4%	49%	44%	3%	0%	1%	1%	2%
AtlasIntel	September 20–25, 2024	1,077 (LV)	± 3.0%	48%	50%	0%	0%	1%	1%	–
Cook Political Report/BSG (R)/GS Strategy Group (D)	September 19–25, 2024	411 (LV)	–	48%	46%	0%	1%	2%	–	3%
MassINC Polling Group	September 12−18, 2024	800 (LV)	± 3.8%	51%	45%	1%	0%	1%	0%	2%
Fabrizio Ward (R)/Impact Research (D)	September 11–14, 2024	600 (LV)	± 4.0%	48%	45%	2%	0%	1%	0%	4%
Marquette University Law School	August 28 – September 5, 2024	822 (RV)	± 4.6%	47%	43%	6%	1%	1%	1%	1%
Marquette University Law School	August 28 – September 5, 2024	738 (LV)	± 4.7%	48%	43%	6%	1%	1%	1%	1% (Note: Randall Terry (C) with 1%)
Z to A Research (D)	August 23–26, 2024	518 (LV)	–	47%	47%	2%	–	0%	1%	3%
YouGov	August 15–23, 2024	500 (A)	± 5.3%	45%	40%	4%	1%	1%	0%	9% (Note: "Will not vote" with 4%)
YouGov	August 15–23, 2024	– (LV)	± 5.9%	49%	45%	1%	1%	0%	0%	4%
Rasmussen Reports (R)	August 13–19, 2024	1,099 (LV)	± 3.0%	46%	46%	4%	1%	1%	0%	2%
Focaldata	August 6–16, 2024	700 (LV)	± 3.7%	50%	44%	4%	–	1%	0%	1%
Focaldata	August 6–16, 2024	700 (RV)	± 3.7%	50%	42%	5%	–	1%	0%	2%
Focaldata	August 6–16, 2024	700 (A)	± 3.7%	50%	43%	5%	–	1%	0%	1%
Redfield & Wilton Strategies	August 12–15, 2024	469 (LV)	–	48%	44%	3%	–	0%	0%	5%
The Bullfinch Group	August 8–11, 2024	500 (RV)	± 4.4%	49%	40%	3%	1%	1%	–	6%
The New York Times/Siena College	August 5–8, 2024	661 (RV)	± 4.3%	49%	42%	6%	0%	1%	1%	2%
The New York Times/Siena College	August 5–8, 2024	661 (LV)	± 4.3%	49%	43%	5%	0%	1%	1%	2%
Navigator Research (D)	July 31 – August 8, 2024	600 (LV)	± 4.0%	45%	45%	5%	1%	1%	1%	2%
Cook Political Report/BSG (R)/GS Strategy Group (D)	July 26 – August 8, 2024	404 (LV)	–	48%	43%	5%	1%	0%	–	3%
Redfield & Wilton Strategies	July 31 – August 3, 2024	597 (LV)	–	43%	43%	3%	–	0%	0%	11%
Marquette University Law School	July 24 – August 1, 2024	877 (RV)	± 4.6%	45%	43%	8%	0%	1%	1%	2%
Marquette University Law School	July 24 – August 1, 2024	801 (LV)	± 4.8%	46%	45%	6%	0%	1%	1%	1%
Bloomberg/Morning Consult	July 24–28, 2024	700 (RV)	± 4.0%	44%	45%	6%	–	0%	3%	2%
Redfield & Wilton Strategies	July 22–24, 2024	523 (LV)	–	44%	44%	5%	–	1%	1%	5%
Fox News	July 22–24, 2024	1,046 (RV)	± 3.0%	46%	46%	5%	1%	1%	–	1%

Kamala Harris vs. Donald Trump vs. Robert F. Kennedy Jr. vs. Jill Stein

Poll source	Date(s) administered	Sample size	Margin of error	Kamala Harris Democratic	Donald Trump Republican	Robert Kennedy Jr Independent	Jill Stein Green	Other / Undecided
Spry Strategies (R)	August 14–20, 2024	600 (LV)	± 4.0%	46%	42%	3%	2%	7%
Emerson College	July 22–23, 2024	845 (RV)	± 3.3%	45%	45%	3%	1%	6%

Kamala Harris vs. Donald Trump vs. Robert F. Kennedy Jr.

Poll source	Date(s) administered	Sample size	Margin of error	Kamala Harris Democratic	Donald Trump Republican	Robert Kennedy Jr Independent	Other / Undecided
Fabrizio Ward (R)	August 19–21, 2024	400 (LV)	± 4.9%	47%	42%	4%	7%
Civiqs	July 13–16, 2024	514 (RV)	± 4.8%	48%	48%	2%	2%

== See also ==
- Nationwide opinion polling for the 2024 United States presidential election
- 2024 United States elections
  - 2024 United States gubernatorial elections
  - 2024 United States House of Representatives elections
  - 2024 United States Senate elections

== Notes ==
Partisan clients
