= Nationwide opinion polling for the 2024 United States presidential election =

This is a list of nationwide public opinion polls that were conducted relating to the general election for the 2024 United States presidential election. Those named in the polls were declared candidates or had received media speculation about their possible candidacy.

== Polling aggregation ==
The following head-to-head polls feature some of the individuals who officially declared their candidacies. The incumbent president, Joe Biden, won the Democratic primaries. On July 21, 2024, Biden withdrew from the race and immediately endorsed his vice president, Kamala Harris, who shortly thereafter became the official nominee of the Democratic Party.

=== Kamala Harris vs. Donald Trump ===

Source of poll aggregation	Dates administered	Dates updated	Kamala Harris Democratic	Donald Trump Republican	Others/ Undecided (Note: Calculated by taking the difference of 100% and all other candidates combined.)	Margin
270toWin	through November 4, 2024	November 5, 2024	48.4%	47.2%	4.4%	Harris +1.2%
538	through November 4, 2024	November 5, 2024	48.0%	46.8%	5.2%	Harris +1.2%
Cook Political Report	through November 4, 2024	November 5, 2024	48.7%	47.8%	3.5%	Harris +0.9%
Decision Desk HQ/The Hill	through November 5, 2024	November 5, 2024	48.4%	48.4%	3.2%	Tie
Silver Bulletin	through November 4, 2024	November 5, 2024	48.6%	47.6%	3.8%	Harris +1.0%
Real Clear Politics	through November 5, 2024	November 5, 2024	48.7%	48.6%	2.7%	Harris +0.1%
Average			48.5%	47.7%	3.8%	Harris +0.8%
2024 Results			48.3%	49.8%	1.9%	Trump +1.5%

=== Kamala Harris vs. Donald Trump vs. Robert F. Kennedy Jr. vs. Jill Stein vs. Chase Oliver vs. Cornel West ===
Source of poll aggregation	Dates administered	Dates updated	Kamala Harris Democratic	Donald Trump Republican	Robert F. Kennedy Jr. (Note: Kennedy dropped out of the race in August 2024, although he remained on the ballot in most states.) Independent	Jill Stein Green	Chase Oliver Libertarian	Cornel West Independent	Others/ Undecided	Margin
Race to the WH	through November 3, 2024	November 4, 2024	47.8%	47.1%	1.3%	0.8%	0.9%	0.6%	1.5%	Harris +0.7%
Real Clear Politics	through November 4, 2024	November 4, 2024	47.2%	47.3%	1.0%	1.0%	0.8%	0.5%	2.2%	Trump +0.1%
270toWin	through November 4, 2024	November 4, 2024	47.5%	46.9%	1.2%	1.2%	0.7%	0.4%	2.1%	Harris +0.6%
Average			47.5%	47.1%	1.2%	1.0%	0.8%	0.5%	1.9%	Harris +0.4%
2024 Results			48.3%	49.8%	0.5%	0.6%	0.4%	<0.1%	0.4%	Trump +1.5%

== National poll results ==
National poll results among declared candidates.

=== Kamala Harris vs. Donald Trump ===
==== 2024 ====
Poll source	Date	Sample size (Note: Key: A – all adults RV – registered voters LV – likely voters V – unclear)	Margin of error	Kamala Harris Democratic	Donald Trump Republican	Others/ Undecided	Lead
Zogby	November 2–3, 2024	1,005 (LV)	± 3.2%	49%	46%	5%	3%
Research Co.	November 2–3, 2024	1,003 (LV)	± 3.1%	48%	46%	6%	2%
Reuters/Ipsos	November 1–3, 2024	973 (LV)	± 3.0%	50%	48%	2%	2%
TIPP	November 1–3, 2024	1,411 (LV)	± 2.7%	48%	48%	4%	—N/a
Patriot Polling	November 1–3, 2024	1115 (RV)	–	49%	48%	3%	1%
AtlasIntel	November 1–2, 2024	2,463 (LV)	± 2.0%	48%	49%	2%	1%
Marist Poll	October 31 – November 2, 2024	1,297 (LV)	± 3.5%	51%	47%	2%	4%
HarrisX/Forbes	October 31 – November 2, 2024	3,759 (LV)	–	51%	49%	–	2%
NBC News	October 30 – November 2, 2024	1,000 (RV)	± 3.1%	49%	49%	2%	—N/a
Emerson College	October 30 – November 2, 2024	1,000 (LV)	± 3.0%	49%	49%	2%	—N/a
ActiVote	October 27 – November 2, 2024	1,000 (LV)	± 3.1%	49%	50%	—N/a	1%
ABC News	October 29 – November 1, 2024	2,267 (LV)	± 2.0%	49%	46%	5%	3%
Kaplan Strategies	October 31, 2024	671 (RV)	± 3.8%	47%	48%	5%	1%
AtlasIntel	October 30–31, 2024	3,490 (LV)	± 2%	48%	50%	1%	2%
Morning Consult	October 29–31, 2024	8,918 (LV)	± 1.0%	49%	47%	4%	2%
Echelon Insights	October 28–31, 2024	1,328 (LV)	± 3.1%	49%	47%	4%	2%
TIPP	October 28–30, 2024	1,265 (LV)	± 2.7%	48%	48%	4%	—N/a
American Pulse Research & Polling	October 28–30, 2024	822 (LV)	± 2.8%	49%	47%	4%	2%
RABA Research	October 29, 2024	781 (LV)	± 3.5%	48%	44%	8%	4%
HarrisX/Forbes	October 27–29, 2024	3,718 (LV)	–	51%	49%	–	2%
TIPP	October 27–29, 2024	1,302 (LV)	± 2.7%	48%	47%	5%	1%
YouGov/The Economist	October 26–29, 2024	1,310 (LV)	± 3.4%	49%	47%	4%	2%
AtlasIntel	October 25–29, 2024	3,032 (LV)	± 2%	48%	50%	1%	2%
TIPP	October 26–28, 2024	1,291 (LV)	± 2.7%	48%	47%	5%	1%
Rasmussen Reports	October 24–28, 2024	2,369 (LV)	± 2.0%	46%	48%	5%	2%
Morning Consult	October 25–27, 2024	8,807 (LV)	± 1.0%	50%	47%	3%	3%
Noble Predictive Insights	October 23–27, 2024	707 (LV)	± 3.7%	49%	46%	4%	3%
Cygnal	October 24–26, 2024	1,507 (LV)	± 2.5%	50%	47%	3%	3%
CBS News/YouGov	October 23–25, 2024	2,154 (LV)	± 2.6%	50%	49%	1%	1%
TIPP	October 23–25, 2024	1,333 (LV)	± 2.7%	48%	48%	4%	—N/a
YouGov/Cooperative Election Study	October 1–25, 2024	48,732 (LV)	–	51%	47%	–	4%
Emerson College	October 23–24, 2024	1,000 (LV)	± 3.0%	49%	49%	2%	—N/a
Rasmussen Reports	October 21–24, 2024	2,745 (LV)	± 2.0%	48%	47%	5%	1%
TIPP	October 22–24, 2024	1,357 (LV)	± 2.7%	49%	47%	4%	2%
ActiVote	October 19–24, 2024	1,000 (LV)	± 3.1%	50%	50%	—N/a	—N/a
TIPP	October 21–23, 2024	1,260 (LV)	± 2.8%	50%	47%	3%	3%
NYTimes/Siena College	October 20–23, 2024	2,516 (LV)	± 2.2%	48%	48%	4%	—N/a
CNN	October 20-23, 2024	1,704 (LV)	± 3.1%	47%	47%	6%	—N/a
Big Village	October 18–23, 2024	1,592 (LV)	± 2.0%	52%	45%	3%	7%
Clarity Campaign Labs	October 17–23, 2024	1,314 (LV)	± 1.5%	50%	46%	4%	4%
ABC News	October 18–22, 2024	1,913 (LV)	± 2.5%	51%	47%	2%	4%
HarrisX/Forbes	October 21–22, 2024	1,244 (LV)	± 2.5%	49%	51%	—N/a	2%
TIPP	October 20–22, 2024	1,294 (LV)	± 2.8%	49%	47%	4%	2%
YouGov/The Economist	October 19–22, 2024	1,293 (LV)	± 3.2%	49%	46%	5%	3%
Wall Street Journal	October 19–22, 2024	1,500 (RV)	± 2.5%	46%	49%	5%	3%
Rasmussen Reports	October 17–22, 2024	1,855 (LV)	± 1.0%	46%	49%	5%	3%
Redfield & Wilton Strategies	October 21, 2024	1,161 (LV)	—N/a	45%	47%	6%	2%
TIPP	October 19–21, 2024	1,268 (LV)	± 2.8%	48%	48%	1%	—N/a
YouGov	October 18–21, 2024	1,189 (LV)	± 3.2%	48%	45%	7%	3%
Reuters/Ipsos	October 16–21, 2024	3,307 (LV)	± 2.0%	48%	45%	7%	3%
Morning Consult	October 18–20, 2024	8,570 (LV)	± 1.0%	50%	46%	4%	4%
TIPP	October 18–20, 2024	1,244 (LV)	± 2.8%	47%	48%	1%	1%
CNBC	October 15–19, 2024	1,000 (LV)	± 3.1%	46%	48%	6%	2%
Suffolk University	October 14–18, 2024	1,000 (LV)	± 3.1%	50%	49%	1%	1%
AtlasIntel	October 12–17, 2024	4,180 (LV)	± 2%	48%	51%	1%	3%
ActiVote	October 9–17, 2024	1,000 (LV)	± 3.1%	49%	51%	—N/a	2%
Emerson College	October 14–16, 2024	1,000 (LV)	± 3.0%	49%	48%	3%	1%
Rasmussen Reports	October 13–16, 2024	2,108 (LV)	± 2.0%	48%	48%	4%	—N/a
TIPP	October 13–15, 2024	1,248 (LV)	± 2.8%	50%	46%	4%	4%
YouGov/The Economist	October 12–15, 2024	1,230 (LV)	± 2.8%	49%	45%	6%	4%
Rasmussen Reports	October 10–15, 2024	2,049 (LV)	± 2.0%	47%	48%	6%	1%
Fox News	October 11–14, 2024	1,110 (RV)	± 3%	48%	50%	—N/a	2%
FDU	October 8–14, 2024	806 (RV)	± 3.5%	50%	47%	3%	3%
Morning Consult	October 11–13, 2024	8,647 (LV)	± 1.0%	50%	46%	4%	4%
Harvard/Harris	October 11–13, 2024	3,145 (RV)	± 1.8%	51%	49%	—N/a	2%
CBS News	October 8–11, 2024	2,719 (LV)	± 2.3%	51%	48%	3%	3%
Marist Poll	October 8–10, 2024	1,401 (LV)	± 3.9%	52%	47%	1%	5%
RMG Research	October 7–10, 2024	2,995 (LV)	± 1.8%	50%	47%	3%	3%
Co/efficient	October 6–8, 2024	2,180 (LV)	± 3.4%	49%	47%	4%	2%
ABC News	October 4–8, 2024	1,714 (LV)	± 2.5%	50%	48%	2%	2%
NBC News	October 4–8, 2024	1,000 (RV)	± 3.1%	48%	48%	4%	—N/a
ActiVote	October 3–8, 2024	1,000 (LV)	± 3.1%	49%	51%	—N/a	2%
Morning Consult	October 4–6, 2024	11,353 (LV)	± 1.0%	51%	46%	3%	5%
Research Co.	October 4–6, 2024	1,001 (LV)	± 3.1%	49%	45%	5%	4%
Pew Research Center	September 30 – October 6, 2024	(RV)	± ?	48%	47%	5%	1%
NYTimes/Siena College	September 29 – October 6, 2024	3,385 (LV)	± 2.4%	49%	46%	5%	3%
I&I/TIPP	October 2–4, 2024	997 (LV)	± 3.2%	49%	46%	5%	3%
Big Village	October 2–4, 2024	755 (LV)	± 3.0%	50%	46%	4%	4%
Yahoo News	October 2–4, 2024	1,714 (A)	± 2.9%	48%	46%	6%	2%
Data for Progress	October 2–3, 2024	1,211 (LV)	± 3.0%	49%	46%	5%	3%
RMG Research	September 30 – October 3, 2024	2,965 (LV)	± 1.8%	49%	49%	2%	—N/a
Rasmussen Reports	September 26 – October 2, 2024	1,762 (LV)	± 2.0%	47%	49%	5%	2%
ActiVote	September 25 – October 2, 2024	1,000 (LV)	± 3.1%	51%	49%	—N/a	2%
Emerson College	September 29 – October 1, 2024	1,000 (LV)	± 3%	50%	48%	2%	2%
YouGov/The Economist	September 29 – October 1, 2024	1,261 (LV)	± 3.1%	49%	46%	5%	3%
Marist College	September 27 – October 1, 2024	1,294 (LV)	± 3.7%	50%	48%	2%	2%
Susquehanna	September 23 – October 1, 2024	1,001 (LV)	± 3.2%	49%	44%	5%	5%
Morning Consult	September 27–29, 2024	11,381 (LV)	± 1%	51%	46%	3%	5%
Léger	September 27–29, 2024	851 (LV)	± 3.1%	51%	47%	2%	4%
Outward Intelligence	September 22–26, 2024	1,735 (LV)	± 2.3%	53%	47%	—N/a	6%
Echelon Insights	September 23–25, 2024	1,005 (LV)	± 3.7%	52%	45%	3%	7%
Big Village	September 23–25, 2024	1,524 (LV)	± 3.7%	50%	46%	4%	4%
Rasmussen Reports	September 22–25, 2024	1,820 (LV)	± 2.0%	46%	48%	6%	2%
YouGov/The Economist	September 21–24, 2024	1,220 (LV)	± 3.1%	49%	46%	5%	3%
Clarity Campaign Labs	September 19–24, 2024	1,000 (LV)	± 1.8%	51%	44%	5%	7%
Reuters/Ipsos	September 21–23, 2024	785 (LV)	± 4.0%	50%	44%	6%	6%
Morning Consult	September 20–22, 2024	11,057 (LV)	± 1%	50%	45%	5%	5%
Quinnipiac	September 19–22, 2024	1,728 (LV)	± 2.4%	47%	48%	4%	1%
CNN	September 19–22, 2024	2,074 (LV)	± 3.0%	48%	47%	4%	1%
YouGov/CBS News	September 18–20, 2024	3,129 (RV)	± 2.2%	52%	48%	—N/a	4%
RMG Research	September 16–19, 2024	2,969 (LV)	± 1.8%	50%	48%	2%	2%
Outward Intelligence	September 15–19, 2024	1,880 (LV)	± 2.3%	53%	47%	—N/a	6%
Rasmussen Reports	September 12–18, 2024	1,855 (LV)	± 2.0%	47%	49%	5%	2%
Florida Atlantic University	September 16–17, 2024	810 (LV)	± 3.4%	49%	45%	6%	4%
YouGov/The Economist	September 15–17, 2024	1,445 (RV)	± 3.2%	49%	45%	6%	4%
NBC News	September 13–17, 2024	1000 (RV)	± 3.1%	49%	44%	7%	5%
ActiVote	September 11–17, 2024	1,000 (LV)	± 3.1%	53%	47%	—N/a	6%
Fox News	September 13–16, 2024	1,102 (RV)	± 3%	50%	48%	2%	2%
Angus Reid	September 13–16, 2024	1,707 (RV)	± 2%	49%	45%	6%	4%
NYTimes/Siena College	September 11–16, 2024	2,437 (LV)	± 3.8%	47%	47%	6%	—N/a
Morning Consult	September 13–15, 2024	11,022 (LV)	± 1%	51%	45%	4%	6%
Big Village	September 11–15, 2024	1,568 (LV)	± 3.1%	51%	43%	6%	8%
Monmouth University	September 11–15, 2024	803 (RV)	± 3.9%	49%	44%	7%	5%
Data for Progress (D)	September 12–13, 2024	1,283 (LV)	± 3.0%	50%	46%	4%	4%
ABC News	September 11–13, 2024	2,196 (LV)	± 2.0%	52%	46%	2%	6%
I&I/TIPP	September 11–13, 2024	1,721 (RV)	± 2.6%	47%	43%	10%	4%
Yahoo News	September 11–13, 2024	—N/a	—N/a	49%	45%	6%	4%
HarrisX/Forbes	September 11–13, 2024	3,018 (RV)	± 1.8%	48%	45%	8%	3%
Reuters/Ipsos	September 11–12, 2024	1,405 (RV)	± 3.0%	47%	42%	11%	5%
Atlas Intel	September 11–12, 2024	1,775 (LV)	± 2%	48%	51%	1%	3%
Morning Consult	September 11, 2024	3,204 (LV)	± 3.0%	50%	45%	5%	5%
Léger	September 10–11, 2024	1,174 (LV)	± 2.7%	50%	47%	3%	3%
RMG Research	September 9–12, 2024	2,756 (LV)	± 1.9%	51%	47%	2%	4%
Rasmussen Reports	September 8–11, 2024	2,390 (LV)	± 3%	47%	49%	2%	2%
Big Village	September 6–8, 2024	1,546 (LV)	± 3.0%	49%	45%	6%	4%
Morning Consult	September 4–8, 2024	10,608 (LV)	± 1.0%	49%	46%	5%	3%
New York Times/Siena College	September 3–6, 2024	1,695 (LV)	± 3%	47%	48%	5%	1%
Harvard/Harris	September 4–5, 2024	2,358 (RV)	± 2.1%	50%	50%	—N/a	—N/a
RMG Research	September 3–5, 2024	2,701 (LV)	± 1.9%	50%	48%	2%	2%
NPR/PBS News/Marist College	September 3–5, 2024	1,413 (LV)	± 3.3%	49%	48%	1%	1%
Outward Intelligence	September 1–5, 2024	1,890 (LV)	± 2.3%	52%	48%	—N/a	4%
Emerson College	September 3–4, 2024	1,000 (LV)	± 3.0%	49%	47%	4%	2%
Morning Consult	September 2–4, 2024	11,414 (RV)	± 1.0%	49%	46%	5%	3%
Rasmussen Reports	August 29 – September 4, 2024	1,893 (LV)	± 3%	46%	47%	3%	1%
Pew Research Center	August 26 – September 2, 2024	9,720 (A)	± 1.3%	49%	49%	2%	—N/a
I&I/TIPP	August 28–30, 2024	1,386 (RV)	± 2.8%	48%	45%	7%	3%
Outward Intelligence	August 25–29, 2024	2,191 (LV)	± 2.1%	53%	47%	—N/a	6%
RMG Research	August 26–28, 2024	2,441 (LV)	± 2.0%	51%	48%	1%	3%
Suffolk University/USA TODAY	August 25–28, 2024	1,000 (LV)	± 3.1%	48%	43%	9%	5%
Rasmussen Reports	August 25–28, 2024	1,879 (LV)	± 2%	46%	48%	3%	2%
Wall Street Journal	August 24–28, 2024	1,500 (RV)	± 2.5%	48%	47%	5%	1%
Clarity Campaign Labs	August 23–28, 2024	1,238 (LV)	± 1.62%	51%	45%	4%	6%
ABC News	August 23–27, 2024	—N/a	± 2.0%	52%	46%	2%	6%
Quinnipiac	August 23–27, 2024	1,611 (LV)	± 2.4%	49%	48%	3%	1%
	August 23, 2024	Robert F. Kennedy Jr. suspends his campaign, endorses Trump					
YouGov/Yahoo	August 22–26, 2024	1,197 (RV)	± 3.0%	47%	46%	3%	1%
Echelon Insights	August 23–25, 2024	1,031 (LV)	± 3.6%	48%	49%	3%	1%
Florida Atlantic University	August 23–25, 2024	929 (RV)	± 3.2%	47%	43%	4%	4%
Leger	August 23–25, 2024	863 (LV)	± 3.05%	50%	46%	4%	4%
Morning Consult	August 23–25, 2024	7,818 (RV)	± 1.0%	48%	44%	8%	4%
Kaplan Strategies	August 24, 2024	1,190 (LV)	± 2.8%	52%	45%	3%	7%
ActiVote	August 15–23, 2024	1,000 (LV)	± 3.1%	53%	47%	—N/a	6%
Rasmussen Reports	August 18–21, 2024	1,893 (LV)	± 3%	46%	49%	2%	3%
FDU	August 17–20, 2024	801 (RV)	± 3.5%	50%	43%	7%	7%
CBS News	August 14–16, 2024	3,253 (LV)	± 2.1%	51%	48%	1%	3%
Outward Intelligence	August 11–15, 2024	1,858 (LV)	± 2.3%	53%	47%	—N/a	6%
Emerson College	August 12–14, 2024	1,000 (LV)	± 3.0%	50%	46%	4%	4%
Rasmussen Reports	August 11–14, 2024	1,885 (LV)	± 2%	45%	49%	3%	4%
ActiVote	August 7–14, 2024	1,000 (LV)	± 3.1%	52%	48%	—N/a	4%
ABC News/The Washington Post	August 9–13, 2024	1,975 (RV)	± 2.5%	49%	45%	6%	4%
Fox News	August 9–12, 2024	1,105 (RV)	± 3%	49%	50%	—N/a	1%
Morning Consult	August 9–11, 2024	11,778 (RV)	± 1.0%	47%	44%	9%	3%
Quantus Polls and News	August 7–8, 2024	1,000 (RV)	—N/a	47%	46%	7%	1%
Rasmussen Reports	August 4–7, 2024	1,794 (LV)	± 2%	44%	49%	3%	5%
Ipsos/Reuters	August 2–7, 2024	2,045 (A)	± 3.0%	42%	37%	21%	5%
ActiVote	July 30 – August 6, 2024	1,000 (LV)	± 3.1%	50%	50%	—N/a	—N/a
	August 6, 2024	Harris selects Governor Tim Walz as her running mate					
SurveyUSA	August 2–4, 2024	1,510 (LV)	± 3.0%	48%	45%	7%	3%
Morning Consult	August 2–4, 2024	11,265 (RV)	± 1.0%	48%	44%	8%	4%
NPR/PBS News/Marist College	August 1–4, 2024	1,513 (RV)	± 3.4%	51%	48%	1%	3%
CNBC	July 31 – August 4, 2024	1,001 (RV)	± 3.1%	46%	48%	—N/a	2%
Issues & Insights/TIPP	July 31 – August 2, 2024	1,326 (RV)	± 2.9%	46%	45%	6%	1%
CBS News/YouGov	July 30 – August 2, 2024	3,102 (RV)	± 2.1%	50%	49%	1%	1%
Marquette Law	July 24 – August 1, 2024	683 (LV)	± 4.7%	53%	47%	—N/a	6%
Rasmussen Reports	July 28–31, 2024	2,163 (LV)	± 2%	44%	49%	4%	5%
Civiqs/Daily Kos	July 27–30, 2024	1,123 (RV)	± 3.0%	49%	45%	6%	4%
ActiVote	July 24–29, 2024	1,000 (LV)	± 3.1%	49%	51%	—N/a	2%
McLaughlin & Associates	July 23–29, 2024	1,000 (LV)	—N/a	45%	47%	8%	2%
Leger	July 26–28, 2024	776 (LV)	± 3.1%	49%	46%	5%	3%
Morning Consult	July 26–28, 2024	11,538 (RV)	± 1.0%	47%	46%	7%	1%
Reuters/Ipsos	July 26–28, 2024	876 (RV)	± 3.5%	43%	42%	15%	1%
Harvard/Harris	July 26–28, 2024	2,196 (RV)	± 2.1%	45%	48%	7%	3%
FAU/Mainstreet Research	July 26–27, 2024	952 (LV)	± 3.1%	48%	46%	6%	2%
Angus Reid Global	July 23–25, 2024	1,743 (RV)	± 2.0%	44%	42%	14% (Note: 5% neither; 9% undecided)	2%
Wall Street Journal	July 25, 2024	1,000 (RV)	± 3.1%	47%	49%	—N/a	2%
AtlasIntel	July 23–25, 2024	1,980 (RV)	± 2%	48%	50%	2%	2%
Forbes/HarrisX	July 22–25, 2024	3,013 (RV)	± 1.8%	45%	47%	9%	2%
New York Times/Siena College	July 22–24, 2024	1,141 (LV)	± 3.3%	47%	48%	5%	1%
CNBC	July 22–24, 2024	2,137 (RV)	± 1.0%	44%	43%	13%	1%
Morning Consult	July 22–24, 2024	11,297 (RV)	± 1.0%	46%	45%	9%	1%
Rasmussen Reports	July 22–24, 2024	1,074 (LV)	± 3%	43%	50%	7%	7%
CNN/SSRS	July 22–23, 2024	1,631 (RV)	± 3%	46%	49%	—N/a	3%
Reuters/Ipsos	July 22–23, 2024	1,018 (RV)	± 3.3%	44%	42%	14%	2%
ActiVote	July 21–23, 2024	1,000 (LV)	± 3.1%	49.5%	50.5%	—N/a	1%
Morning Consult	July 21–22, 2024	4,001 (RV)	± 2.0%	45%	47%	8%	2%
	July 21, 2024	Joe Biden announces his withdrawal, endorses Harris; Harris declares her candidacy					
North Star Opinion/American Greatness	July 20–23, 2024	600 (LV)	—N/a	45%	47%	9%	2%
Yahoo News	July 19–22, 2024	1,743 (A)	± 2.8%	46%	46%	8%	—N/a
MainStreet Research	July 19–21, 2024	780 (IVR)	± 3.5%	44%	49%	3%	5%
Echelon Insights	July 19–21, 2024	982 (LV)	± 3.8%	47%	49%	4%	2%
Forbes/HarrisX	July 19–21, 2024	2,753 (RV)	± 1.9%	47%	53%	0%	6%
CBS News	July 16–18, 2024	2,247 (RV)	± 2.7%	48%	51%	1%	3%
Reuters/Ipsos	July 15–16, 2024	992 (RV)	± 3.0%	44%	44%	12%	—N/a
	July 15, 2024	Trump selects Senator JD Vance as his running mate					
NPR/PBS News/Marist College	July 9–10, 2024	1,174 (RV)	± 3.3%	50%	49%	1%	1%
Fox News	July 7–10, 2024	1,210 (RV)	± 3.0%	48%	49%	3%	1%
NBC News	July 7–9, 2024	800 (RV)	± 3.46%	45%	47%	8%	2%
ABC News/The Washington Post/Ipsos	July 5–9, 2024	2,041 (RV)	± 2.0%	49%	47%	4%	2%
Emerson College	July 7–8, 2024	1,370 (RV)	± 2.6%	43%	49%	8%	6%
Bendixen & Amandi International (D)	July 2–6, 2024	1,000 (LV)	± 3.1%	42%	41%	17% (Note: "Third party" with 5%)	1%
Reuters/Ipsos	July 1–2, 2024	1,070 (A)	± 3.5%	42%	43%	15%	1%
Yahoo News/YouGov	June 28 – July 1, 2024	1,176 (RV)	± 2.9%	45%	47%	9%	2%
Forbes/HarrisX	June 28–30, 2024	1,500 (RV)	± 2.5%	47%	53%	—N/a	6%
CNN/SSRS	June 28–30, 2024	1,045 (RV)	± 3.5%	45%	47%	8%	2%
McLaughlin & Associates	June 18–24, 2024	1,000 (LV)	—N/a	42%	47%	11%	5%

==== 2023 ====
Poll source	Date	Sample size	Margin of error	Kamala Harris Democratic	Donald Trump Republican	Others/ Undecided
McLaughlin & Associates	December 13–19, 2023	1,000 (LV)	—N/a	42%	49%	9%
Beacon Research/Shaw & Company Research/Fox News	November 10–13, 2023	1,001 (RV)	± 3.0%	45%	50%	5%
Harvard/Harris (Note: Poll sponsored by Harvard University Center for American Political Studies)	September 13–14, 2023	2,103 (RV)	—N/a	40%	46%	14%
Harvard/Harris	May 17–18, 2023	2,004 (RV)	—N/a	39%	50%	11%
Redfield & Wilton Strategies	May 17, 2023	1,117 (LV)	—N/a	39%	42%	19%
Harvard/Harris	April 18–19, 2023	1,845 (RV)	—N/a	38%	48%	14%
Redfield & Wilton Strategies	April 4, 2023	1,180 (LV)	—N/a	36%	43%	21%
Harvard/Harris	March 22–23, 2023	2,905 (RV)	—N/a	38%	48%	14%
Redfield & Wilton Strategies	March 20, 2023	1,250 (LV)	—N/a	37%	45%	18%
McLaughlin & Associates	March 16–20, 2023	1,000 (LV)	—N/a	42%	48%	10%
YouGov/Yahoo News	February 23–27, 2023	1,014 (RV)	± 2.7%	42%	45%	13%
McLaughlin & Associates	February 17–23, 2023	1,000 (LV)	—N/a	43%	48%	9%
Redfield & Wilton Strategies	February 19, 2023	1,102 (LV)	—N/a	41%	42%	17%
Harvard/Harris	February 15–16, 2023	1,838 (RV)	—N/a	39%	49%	12%
Rasmussen Reports	February 8–12, 2023	900 (LV)	± 3.0%	42%	45%	13%
Public Policy Polling (D)	February 10–11, 2023	1,056 (RV)	—N/a	47%	47%	6%
Redfield & Wilton Strategies	January 28–29, 2023	1,139 (LV)	—N/a	38%	43%	19%
McLaughlin & Associates	January 19–24, 2023	1,000 (LV)	—N/a	40%	50%	10%
Harvard/Harris	January 18–19, 2023	2,050 (RV)	—N/a	40%	48%	12%
Redfield & Wilton Strategies	January 16, 2023	1,458 (RV)	—N/a	39%	42%	19%

==== 2022 ====
Poll source	Date	Sample size	Margin of error	Kamala Harris Democratic	Donald Trump Republican	Others/ Undecided
Harvard/Harris	December 14–15, 2022	1,851 (RV)	—N/a	40%	46%	14%
McLaughlin & Associates	December 9–14, 2022	1,000 (LV)	—N/a	42%	49%	9%
Redfield & Wilton Strategies	December 5, 2022	1,162 (LV)	—N/a	41%	43%	16%
Redfield & Wilton Strategies	November 17, 2022	1,203 (LV)	—N/a	43%	43%	14%
Harvard/Harris	November 16–17, 2022	2,212 (RV)	—N/a	40%	47%	13%
Redfield & Wilton Strategies	November 2, 2022	1,084 (LV)	—N/a	38%	45%	17%
McLaughlin & Associates	October 12–17, 2022	1,000 (LV)	—N/a	42%	51%	7%
Harvard/Harris	October 12–13, 2022	2,010 (RV)	—N/a	38%	49%	13%
Redfield & Wilton Strategies	October 12, 2022	1,110 (LV)	—N/a	40%	42%	18%
Redfield & Wilton Strategies	October 2–3, 2022	1,128 (LV)	—N/a	41%	41%	18%
McLaughlin & Associates	September 17–22, 2022	1,000 (LV)	—N/a	42%	51%	7%
Refield & Wilton Strategies	September 14–15, 2022	1,163 (LV)	—N/a	40%	42%	18%
Harvard/Harris	September 7–8, 2022	1,854 (RV)	—N/a	40%	47%	13%
Redfield & Wilton Strategies	August 28, 2022	1,050 (LV)	—N/a	40%	43%	17%
McLaughlin & Associates	August 20–24, 2022	1,000 (LV)	—N/a	43%	51%	6%
Redfield and Wilton Strategies	August 17, 2022	1,156 (LV)	—N/a	37%	43%	20%
YouGov/Yahoo News	July 28 – August 1, 2022	1,152 (RV)	—N/a	45%	44%	11%
Redfield and Wilton Strategies	July 29, 2022	1,094 (LV)	—N/a	36%	42%	22%
Harvard/Harris	July 27–28, 2022	1,885 (RV)	—N/a	40%	47%	13%
Echelon Insights	July 15–18, 2022	1,022 (LV)	—N/a	46%	44%	10%
Redfield and Wilton Strategies	July 9, 2022	1,078 (LV)	—N/a	39%	43%	18%
Harvard/Harris	June 28–29, 2022	1,308 (RV)	—N/a	39%	45%	16%
YouGov/Yahoo News	June 24–27, 2022	1,239 (RV)	—N/a	44%	45%	11%
McLaughlin & Associates	June 17–22, 2022	1,000 (LV)	—N/a	42%	50%	8%
Redfield and Wilton Strategies	June 15, 2022	1,064 (LV)	—N/a	37%	43%	20%
Redfield and Wilton Strategies	May 30, 2022	1,173 (LV)	—N/a	40%	46%	14%
Harvard/Harris	May 18–19, 2022	1,963 (RV)	—N/a	40%	47%	14%
Redfield and Wilton Strategies	May 17, 2022	1,120 (LV)	—N/a	37%	44%	19%
Redfield and Wilton Strategies	May 1, 2022	1,096 (LV)	—N/a	39%	43%	18%
McLaughlin & Associates	April 22–26, 2022	1,000 (LV)	—N/a	41%	51%	8%
Harvard/Harris	April 20–21, 2022	1,966 (RV)	—N/a	41%	47%	12%
Echelon Insights	April 18–20, 2022	1,001 (LV)	—N/a	43%	47%	10%
Redfield and Wilton Strategies	April 18, 2022	1,500 (LV)	—N/a	39%	45%	16%
Redfield and Wilton Strategies	April 3, 2022	1,205 (LV)	—N/a	35%	44%	21%
Harvard/Harris	March 23–24, 2022	1,990 (RV)	—N/a	38%	49%	13%
McLaughlin & Associates	March 17–22, 2022	1,000 (LV)	—N/a	42%	50%	8%
Redfield and Wilton Strategies	March 20, 2022	1,193 (LV)	—N/a	39%	42%	19%
Redfield and Wilton Strategies	March 8, 2022	1,194 (LV)	—N/a	37%	42%	21%
Schoen Cooperman Research	March 2–6, 2022	800 (LV)	—N/a	43%	47%	10%
Harvard/Harris	February 23–24, 2022	2,026 (RV)	—N/a	39%	51%	10%
Redfield and Wilton Strategies	February 23, 2022	1,367 (LV)	—N/a	41%	37%	22%
McLaughlin & Associates	February 16–22, 2022	1,000 (LV)	—N/a	43%	50%	7%
Redfield and Wilton Strategies	February 6, 2022	1,406 (RV)	—N/a	40%	43%	17%
Harvard/Harris	January 19–20, 2022	1,815 (RV)	—N/a	39%	49%	12%
McLaughlin & Associates	January 13–18, 2022	1,000 (LV)	—N/a	40%	51%	9%
Redfield and Wilton Strategies	January 8–9, 2022	1,430 (LV)	—N/a	41%	41%	18%

==== 2021 ====
Poll source	Date	Sample size	Margin of error	Kamala Harris Democratic	Donald Trump Republican	Others/ Undecided
Redfield and Wilton Strategies	December 5, 2021	1,387 (LV)	—N/a	38%	42%	20%
Harvard/Harris	November 30 – December 2, 2021	1,989 (RV)	—N/a	41%	50%	9%
McLaughlin & Associates	November 11–16, 2021	1,000 (LV)	—N/a	42%	50%	8%
Redfield and Wilton Strategies	November 15, 2021	1,500 (RV)	—N/a	33%	42%	25%
McLaughlin & Associates	October 14–18, 2021	1,000 (LV)	—N/a	46%	49%	4%
Rasmussen Reports	September 21–22, 2021	1,000 (LV)	± 3.0%	39%	52%	9%
McLaughlin & Associates	September 9–14, 2021	1,000 (LV)	—N/a	47%	49%	4%
McLaughlin & Associates	July 29 – August 3, 2021	1,000 (LV)	—N/a	46%	49%	5%
Echelon Insights	June 18–22, 2021	1,001 (RV)	—N/a	47%	40%	13%
McLaughlin & Associates	June 16–20, 2021	1,000 (LV)	—N/a	45%	49%	6%
McLaughlin & Associates	May 12–18, 2021	1,000 (LV)	—N/a	45%	49%	6%

=== Kamala Harris vs. Donald Trump vs. Robert F. Kennedy Jr. vs. Cornel West vs. Jill Stein ===
Poll source	Date	Sample size	Margin of error	Kamala Harris Democratic	Donald Trump Republican	Robert F. Kennedy Jr. Independent	Cornel West Independent	Jill Stein Green	Others/ Undecided
I&I/TIPP	November 2–4, 2024	1,863 (LV)	± 2.3%	48.3%	48.6%	—N/a	0.8%	0.5%	1.8%
I&I/TIPP	November 1–3, 2024	1,411 (LV)	± 2.7%	48.3%	48.8%	—N/a	0.7%	0.7%	1.6%
AtlasIntel	November 1–2, 2024	2,463 (LV)	± 2.0%	47%	49%	—N/a	0.3%	1%	2% (Note: Oliver (L) & "Blank/null/won't vote" with 0.3%)
I&I/TIPP	October 31 – November 2, 2024	1,305 (LV)	± 2.9%	47.6%	48.6%	—N/a	0.8%	0.8%	2.3%
AtlasIntel	October 30–31, 2024	3,490 (LV)	± 2%	47%	49%	—N/a	—N/a	1%	2%
I&I/TIPP	October 29–31, 2024	1,249 (LV)	± 2.7%	47.8%	48.5%	—N/a	1.2%	0.5%	2%
I&I/TIPP	October 28–30, 2024	1,265 (LV)	± 2.7%	48%	48%	—N/a	1%	1%	2%
AtlasIntel	October 25–29, 2024	3,032 (LV)	± 2%	47%	50%	—N/a	0.3%	1%	2%
AtlasIntel	October 12–17, 2024	4,180 (LV)	± 2%	48%	51%	—N/a	0.1%	1%	1%
Harvard/Harris	October 11–13, 2024	3,145 (RV)	± 1.8%	49%	48%	—N/a	2%	1%	—N/a
NBC News	October 4–8, 2024	1,000 (RV)	± 3.1%	46%	47%	2%	0%	1%	4%
Quinnipiac	September 19–22, 2024	1,728 (LV)	± 2.4%	47%	48%	—N/a	1%	1%	1%
AtlasIntel	September 11–12, 2024	1,775 (LV)	± 2%	47.3%	50.9%	—N/a	0.2%	0.4%	1.1%
Harvard/Harris	September 4–5, 2024	2,358 (RV)	± 2.1%	46%	46%	—N/a	1%	1%	6%
	August 23, 2024	Kennedy suspends his campaign.							
Outward Intelligence	August 11–15, 2024	1,858 (LV)	± 2.3%	49%	43%	6.6%	0.5%	0.8%	—N/a
Emerson College	August 12–14, 2024	1,000 (LV)	± 3.0%	48%	44%	4%	0%	1%	3%
The Economist/YouGov	August 11–13, 2024	1,407 (RV)	± 3.1%	46%	44%	3%	0%	1%	6%
Fox News	August 9–12, 2024	1,105 (RV)	± 3%	45%	45%	6%	1%	1%	—N/a
JL Partners	August 7–11, 2024	1,001 (LV)	± 3.1%	41%	43%	5%	1%	1%	9%
The Economist/YouGov	August 4–6, 2024	1,410 (RV)	± 3.1%	45%	43%	2%	0%	1%	7%
NPR/PBS News/Marist College	August 1–4, 2024	1,513 (RV)	± 3.4%	48%	45%	5%	1%	1%	—N/a
CBS News/YouGov	July 30 – August 2, 2024	3,102 (RV)	± 2.1%	49%	47%	2%	0%	0%	2%
The Economist/YouGov	July 27–30, 2024	1,430 (RV)	± 3.1%	46%	44%	3%	0%	0%	6%
McLaughlin & Associates	July 23–29, 2024	1,000 (LV)	N/A	41%	42%	8%	1%	1%	7%
Leger	July 26–28, 2024	786 (LV)	± 3.1%	48%	41%	5%	1%	1%	3%
Harvard/Harris	July 26–28, 2024	2,196 (RV)	± 2.1%	42%	45%	7%	1%	1%	4%
AtlasIntel	July 23–25, 2024	1,980 (RV)	± 2%	46.1%	47.7%	4.5%	0.2%	—N/a	1.5%
Wall Street Journal	July 23–25, 2024	1,000 (RV)	± 3.1%	45%	44%	4%	1%	1%	5%
New York Times/Siena College	July 22–24, 2024	1,000 (RV)	± 3.1%	44%	43%	5%	1%	0%	7%
Big Village	July 22–24, 2024	1,492 (LV)	± 3%	42.7%	44.3%	5.6%	1.1%	1.4%	4.3%
The Economist/YouGov	July 21–23, 2024	1,605 (RV)	± 3.3%	41%	44%	5%	1%	1%	5%
NPR/PBS	July 22, 2024	1,309 (A)	± 3.2%	42%	42%	7%	1%	1%	7%
	July 21, 2024	Harris declares her candidacy.							
The Economist/YouGov	July 7–9, 2024	1,443 (RV)	± 3.1%	38%	42%	5%	1%	2%	13%
Forbes/HarrisX	June 28–30, 2024	1,500 (RV)	± 2.5%	38%	43%	16%	2%	2%	—N/a

== Hypothetical polling ==
=== Robert F. Kennedy Jr. ===
The following nationwide polls feature Robert F. Kennedy Jr., who is an independent candidate who suspended his campaign and endorsed Donald Trump.

Hypothetical polling with Robert F. Kennedy Jr.

==== Kamala Harris vs. Donald Trump vs. Robert F. Kennedy Jr. ====
Source of poll aggregation	Dates administered	Dates updated	Kamala Harris Democratic	Donald Trump Republican	Robert F. Kennedy Jr. Independent	Others/ Undecided	Margin
Decision Desk HQ/The Hill	through August 23, 2024	August 24, 2024	49.0%	43.9%	2.7%	4.4%	Harris +5.1%
538	through August 22, 2024	August 23, 2024	47.3%	43.6%	4.6%	4.5%	Harris +3.7%
Silver Bulletin	through August 23, 2024	August 23, 2024	48.0%	43.7%	3.9%	4.4%	Harris +4.3%
Average			48.1%	43.7%	3.7%	4.4%	Harris +4.4%

Poll source	Date	Sample size	Margin of error	Kamala Harris Democratic	Donald Trump Republican	Robert F. Kennedy Jr. Independent	Others/ Undecided
	August 23, 2024	Kennedy suspends his campaign.					
RMG Research	August 12–14, 2024	2,708 (LV)	± 1.9%	47%	49%	2%	4%
Pew Research	August 5–11, 2024	9,201 (A)	± 1.3%	46%	45%	7%	2%
Rasmussen Reports	August 4–7, 2024	1,794 (LV)	± 2%	44%	49%	3%	2%
ActiVote	July 30 – August 6, 2024	1,000 (LV)	± 3.1%	45.0%	44.4%	10.5%	—N/a
RMG Research	July 29–31, 2024	3,000 (RV)	—N/a	47%	42%	6%	5%
Redfield & Wilton Strategies	July 29, 2024	1,750 (LV)	± 3.0%	45%	43%	5%	4%
Harvard/Harris	July 26–28, 2024	2,196 (RV)	± 2.1%	42%	45%	8%	5%
ActiVote	July 24–29, 2024	1,000 (LV)	± 3.1%	44.3%	45.5%	10.3%	—N/a
Forbes/HarrisX	July 22–25, 2024	3,013 (RV)	± 1.8%	42%	43%	9%	6%
RMG Research	July 22–23, 2024	2,000 (RV)	—N/a	46%	48%	6%	—N/a
Reuters/Ipsos	July 22–23, 2024	1,241 (A)	± 3.0%	42%	38%	8%	12%
	July 21, 2024	Harris declares her candidacy.					
Forbes/HarrisX	June 28–30, 2024	1,500 (RV)	± 2.5%	40%	43%	17%	—N/a

=== Joe Biden vs. Donald Trump ===
The following nationwide polls feature Joe Biden, who was the presumptive nominee for the Democratic party before he withdrew from the race and endorsed Kamala Harris.

Hypothetical polling with Joe Biden and Donald Trump

==== Joe Biden vs. Donald Trump ====
Local regression of two-way polling between Trump and Biden conducted up to the 2024 United States presidential election (excludes others and undecided). The dashed line marks Biden's withdrawal from the race.

Source of poll aggregation	Dates administered	Dates updated	Joe Biden Democratic	Donald Trump Republican	Others/ Undecided	Margin
RealClearPolitics	June 28 – July 23, 2024	July 23, 2024	44.8%	47.9%	7.3%	Trump +3.1%
Race to the WH	through July 23, 2024	July 23, 2024	44.1%	46.2%	9.7%	Trump +2.1%
Decision Desk HQ/The Hill	through July 23, 2024	July 23, 2024	43.3%	46.6%	10.1%	Trump +3.3%
Average			44.1%	46.9%	9.0%	Trump +2.8%

==== Joe Biden vs. Donald Trump vs. Robert F. Kennedy Jr. ====
Local regression of two-way polling between Trump, Biden and Kennedy conducted up to the 2024 United States presidential election (excludes others and undecided). The dashed line marks Biden's withdrawal from the race.

Source of poll aggregation	Dates administered	Dates updated	Joe Biden Democratic	Donald Trump Republican	Robert F. Kennedy Jr. Independent	Others/ Undecided	Margin
Decision Desk HQ/The Hill	through July 23, 2024	July 23, 2024	38.6%	42.6%	8.7%	10.1%	Trump +4.0%
538	through July 21, 2024	July 21, 2024	40.2%	43.5%	8.7%	7.6%	Trump +3.3%
Average			39.4%	43.05%	8.7%	8.85%	Trump +3.65%

==== Joe Biden vs. Donald Trump vs. Robert F. Kennedy Jr. vs. Cornel West vs. Jill Stein ====
Poll source	Dates administered	Dates updated	Joe Biden Democratic	Donald Trump Republican	Robert F. Kennedy Jr. Independent	Cornel West Independent	Jill Stein Green	Others/ Undecided	Margin
RealClearPolitics	through July 23, 2024	July 23, 2024	39.2%	43.4%	8.7%	1.6%	1.9%	5.2%	Trump +4.2%
Race to the WH	through July 23, 2024	July 23, 2024	39.7%	42.6%	8.8%	1.6%	1.4%	5.9%	Trump +2.9%
Average			39.45%	43.0%	8.8%	1.6%	1.7%	5.6%	Trump +3.55%

==== Joe Biden vs. Donald Trump (2024) ====
Poll source	Date	Sample size	Margin of error	Joe Biden Democratic	Donald Trump Republican	Others/ Undecided
	July 21, 2024	Biden withdraws from the race.				
Reuters/Ipsos	July 15–16, 2024	992 (RV)	± 3.0%	41%	43%	14%
Morning Consult	July 15, 2024	2,045 (RV)	± 1.0%	45%	46%	9%
Forbes/HarrisX	July 13–15, 2024	1,918 (RV)	± 2.2%	49%	51%	—N/a
	July 13, 2024	Trump suffers an assassination attempt in Pennsylvania.				
Activote	July 7–15, 2024	1,000 (LV)	± 3.1%	49.5%	50.5%	—N/a
Survey USA	July 12–15, 2024	1,098 (LV)	± 3.2%	43%	44%	13%
The Center Square/Noble Predictive Insights	July 8–11, 2024	2,300 (LV)	± 2.1%	43%	46%	12%
Rasmussen Reports	July 7–11, 2024	1,847 (LV)	± 2.0%	43%	49%	8%
NPR/PBS News/Marist College	July 9–10, 2024	1,174 (RV)	± 3.3%	50%	48%	2%
Fox News	July 7–10, 2024	1,210 (RV)	± 3.0%	48%	49%	3%
NBC News	July 7–9, 2024	800 (RV)	± 3.5%	43%	45%	12%
ABC News/The Washington Post/Ipsos	July 5–9, 2024	2,041 (RV)	± 2.0%	46%	46%	8%
Emerson College	July 7–8, 2024	1,370 (RV)	± 2.6%	43%	46%	11%
Morning Consult	July 5–7, 2024	11,323 (RV)	± 1.0%	42%	44%	14%
Pew Research Center	July 1–7, 2024	7,729 (RV)	—N/a	47%	50%	3%
Lord Ashcroft	June 28 – July 7, 2024	4,347 (LV)	—N/a	44%	42%	14%
Bendixen & Amandi International (D)	July 2–6, 2024	1,000 (LV)	± 3.1%	42%	43%	15% (Note: "Third party" with 5%)
Cygnal (R)	July 1–2, 2024	1,500 (LV)	± 2.53%	43%	48%	9%
Reuters/Ipsos	July 1–2, 2024	1,070 (RV)	± 3.5%	40%	40%	20%
Wall Street Journal	June 29 – July 2, 2024	1,500 (RV)	± 2.5%	42%	48%	10%
CBS News/YouGov	June 28 – July 2, 2024	2,815 (LV)	± 2.3%	48%	50%	2%
New York Times/Siena College	June 28 – July 2, 2024	1,532 (LV)	± 2.3%	43%	49%	7%
Yahoo! News/YouGov	June 28 – July 1, 2024	1,176 (RV)	± 2.9%	43%	45%	12%
Florida Atlantic University/Mainstreet Research	June 29–30, 2024	869 (LV)	—N/a	44%	46%	11%
Harvard/Harris	June 28–30, 2024	2,090 (RV)	—N/a	48%	52%	—N/a
Forbes/HarrisX	June 28–30, 2024	1,500 (RV)	± 2.5%	48%	52%	—N/a
CNN/SSRS	June 28–30, 2024	1,045 (RV)	± 3.5%	43%	49%	8%
Morning Consult	June 28, 2024	2,068 (RV)	± 2.0%	45%	44%	11%
Data for Progress (D)	June 28, 2024	1,011 (LV)	± 3.0%	45%	48%	13%
SurveyUSA	June 28, 2024	2,315 (LV)	± 2.5%	43%	45%	13%
Leger/New York Post	June 27–28, 2024	841 (LV)	± 3.09%	38%	45%	17%
Issues & Insights/TIPP	June 26–28, 2024	1,244 (RV)	± 2.8%	43%	41%	16%
	June 27, 2024	The presidential debate between Biden and Trump is hosted by CNN in Atlanta.				
New York Times/Siena College	June 20–25, 2024	1,226 (LV)	± 3.5%	44%	48%	8%
Leger/New York Post	June 22–24, 2024	815 (LV)	± 3.01%	45%	43%	12%
Quinnipiac University	June 20–24, 2024	1,405 (RV)	± 2.6%	45%	49%	6%
McLaughlin & Associates	June 18–24, 2024	1,000 (LV)	—N/a	44%	46%	10%
Morning Consult	June 21–23, 2024	10,159 (RV)	± 1.0%	44%	44%	12%
CBS News/YouGov	June 17–21, 2024	1,878 (LV)	—N/a	49%	50%	—N/a
ActiVote	June 5–21, 2024	2,029 (LV)	± 2.2%	48%	52%	—N/a
Rasmussen Reports	June 20, 2024	1,000 (LV)	± 3.0%	40%	49%	11%
Fox News	June 14–17, 2024	1,095 (RV)	± 3.0%	50%	48%	2%
Morning Consult	June 14–16, 2024	10,132 (RV)	± 1.0%	44%	43%	13%
Echelon Insights	June 10–12, 2024	1,013 (LV)	± 3.7%	48%	47%	5%
NPR/PBS	June 10–12, 2024	1,184 (RV)	± 3.8%	49%	49%	—N/a
Reuters/Ipsos	June 10–11, 2024	930 (RV)	± 3.0%	39%	41%	20%
Civiqs/Daily Kos	June 8–11, 2024	1,140 (RV)	± 3.1%	45%	45%	10%
Morning Consult	June 7–9, 2024	10,260 (RV)	± 1.0%	44%	43%	13%
CBS News/YouGov	June 5–7, 2024	1,359 (LV)	—N/a	49%	50%	1%
Cygnal (R)	June 4–6, 2024	1,500 (LV)	± 2.53%	44.5%	46.5%	9%
Yahoo! News/YouGov	June 3–6, 2024	1,239 (RV)	± 2.8%	46%	44%	10%
Emerson College	June 4–5, 2024	1,000 (RV)	± 3.0%	50%	50%	—N/a
ActiVote	May 23 – June 4, 2024	1,671 (LV)	± 2.4%	48%	52%	—N/a
Navigator Research	May 23 – June 3, 2024	812 (LV)	± 2.8%	48%	44%	8%
Morning Consult	May 31, 2024	2,200 (RV)	—N/a	45%	44%	11%
Survey Monkey/The 19th	May 30–31, 2024	5,893 (A)	± 1.5%	30%	34%	36%
Reuters/Ipsos	May 30–31, 2024	2,135 (RV)	± 2.1%	41%	39%	20%
Issues & Insights/TIPP	May 29–31, 2024	1,675 (RV)	± 2.5%	41%	41%	19%
Leger/The Canadian Press	May 24–26, 2024	883 (LV)	± 3.09%	42%	43%	15%
NPR/PBS	May 21–23, 2024	1,122 (RV)	± 3.7%	50%	48%	2%
McLaughlin & Associates (Note: Poll sponsored by Lawrence Kadish)	May 21–23, 2024	1,000 (LV)	—N/a	44%	46%	10%
Emerson College	May 21–23, 2024	1,100 (RV)	± 2.9%	50%	50%	—N/a
ActiVote	May 6–21, 2024	1,081 (LV)	± 3.0%	49%	51%	—N/a
Quinnipiac University	May 16–20, 2024	1,374 (RV)	± 2.6%	48%	47%	5%
Harvard-Harris	May 15–16, 2024	1,660 (RV)	± 2.0%	47%	53%	—N/a
Cygnal (R)	May 14–16, 2024	1,500 (LV)	± 2.53%	45%	46%	9%
Echelon Insights	May 13–16, 2024	1,023 (LV)	± 3.7%	46%	49%	6%
Marquette Law University	May 6–15, 2024	911 (RV)	—N/a	50%	50%	—N/a
Reuters/Ipsos	May 7–14, 2024	3,208 (RV)	± 2.0%	46%	46%	8%
Yahoo! News/YouGov	May 10–13, 2024	1,198 (RV)	± 2.7%	45%	45%	10%
Fox News	May 10–13, 2024	1,126 (RV)	± 3.0%	48%	49%	2%
Ipsos	May 7–13, 2024	1,730 (RV)	± 2.2%	48%	48%	4%
RMG Research	May 6–9, 2024	2,000 (LV)	—N/a	44%	42%	14%
Morning Consult	May 3–5, 2024	9,918 (RV)	± 1.0%	43%	44%	13%
Issues & Insights/TIPP	May 1–3, 2024	1,264 (RV)	± 2.8%	42%	40%	18%
Data for Progress (D)/Zeteo	May 1–2, 2024	1,240 (LV)	± 3.0%	47%	46%	6%
KFF	April 23 – May 1, 2024	1,243 (RV)	± 4.0%	46%	45%	9%
Reuters/Ipsos	April 29–30, 2024	856 (RV)	± 3.0%	40%	39%	21%
ABC News	April 25–30, 2024	2,260 (RV)	± 2.0%	46%	45%	9%
ActiVote	April 13–30, 2024	953 (LV)	± 3.2%	47%	53%	—N/a
Florida Atlantic University/Mainstreet Research	April 26–28, 2024	851 (LV)	± 3.0%	47%	46%	7%
Leger/The Canadian Press	April 26–28, 2024	887 (LV)	± 3.09%	42%	43%	16%
Morning Consult	April 26–28, 2024	10,109 (RV)	± 1.0%	43%	43%	14%
HarrisX/Harris	April 24–25, 2024	1,961 (RV)	± 2.0%	48%	52%	—N/a
NPR/PBS	April 22–25, 2024	1,109 (RV)	± 3.7%	50%	48%	2%
CNN/SSRS	April 18–23, 2024	967 (RV)	± 3.4%	43%	49%	8%
Quinnipiac University	April 18–22, 2024	1,429 (RV)	± 2.6%	46%	46%	8%
Morning Consult	April 19–21, 2024	9,791 (RV)	± 1.0%	44%	43%	13%
John Zogby Strategies (Note: Poll sponsored by Kennedy's campaign)	April 14–21, 2024	23,683 (LV)	± 0.6%	45.7%	46.1%	8.2%
University of North Florida	April 8–20, 2024	745 (LV)	± 4.2%	45%	47%	9%
Marist College	April 16–18, 2024	1,047 (RV)	± 3.6%	51%	48%	1%
Emerson College	April 16–17, 2024	1,308 (RV)	± 2.6%	43%	46%	11%
Morning Consult	April 15–17, 2024	7,990 (RV)	± 1.0%	42%	42%	16%
Civiqs/Daily Kos	April 13–16, 2024	1,161 (RV)	± 3.0%	44%	45%	11%
NBC News	April 12–16, 2024	1,000 (RV)	± 3.0%	44%	46%	10%
Yahoo! News/YouGov	April 11–15, 2024	1,171 (RV)	± 2.6%	44%	44%	12%
Echelon Insights	April 12–14, 2024	1,020 (LV)	± 3.9%	49%	46%	5%
New York Times/Siena College	April 7–11, 2024	1,059 (LV)	± 3.9%	46%	47%	7%
ActiVote	March 24 – April 10, 2024	995 (LV)	± 3.1%	47%	53%	—N/a
Reuters/Ipsos	April 3–8, 2024	833 (RV)	± 4.0%	41%	37%	22%
Morning Consult	April 5–7, 2024	6,236 (RV)	± 1.0%	43%	44%	13%
Issues & Insights/TIPP	April 3–5, 2024	1,265 (RV)	± 2.8%	43%	40%	17%
RMG Research	April 1–4, 2024	1,679 (LV)	± 2.4%	44%	43%	13%
Emerson College	April 2–3, 2024	1,438 (RV)	± 2.5%	45%	46%	8%
Rasmussen Reports	March 31 – April 2, 2024	1,099 (LV)	± 3.0%	41%	49%	10%
Morning Consult	March 29–31, 2024	6,018 (RV)	± 1.0%	44%	42%	14%
Data for Progress (D)	March 27–29, 2024	1,200 (LV)	± 3.0%	47%	46%	7%
NPR/PBS	March 25–28, 2024	1,199 (RV)	± 3.7%	50%	48%	2%
Marquette Law School	March 18–28, 2024	674 (LV)	± 4.9%	52%	48%	—N/a
Forbes/HarrisX	March 25, 2024	1,010 (RV)	± 3.1%	50%	50%	—N/a
Fox News	March 22–25, 2024	1,094 (RV)	± 3.0%	45%	50%	5%
Quinnipiac University	March 21–25, 2024	1,407 (RV)	—N/a	48%	45%	7%
Morning Consult	March 22–24, 2024	5,833 (RV)	± 1.0%	44%	43%	13%
ActiVote	March 8–22, 2024	1,001 (LV)	± 3.1%	47%	53%	—N/a
HarrisX/Harris	March 20–21, 2024	2,111 (RV)	—N/a	49%	51%	—N/a
The Economist/YouGov	March 16–19, 2024	1,509 (RV)	± 3.4%	44%	43%	13%
Florida Atlantic University/Mainstreet Research	March 15–17, 2024	941 (LV)	± 3.0%	47%	45%	8%
Morning Consult	March 15–17, 2024	5,777 (RV)	± 1.0%	43%	43%	14%
Grinnell College	March 11–17, 2024	715 (LV)	± 3.7%	38%	45%	17%
Noble Predictive Insights/The Center Square	March 11–15, 2024	2,510 (RV)	± 2.0%	45%	46%	9%
McLaughlin & Associates	March 9–14, 2024	1,000 (LV)	—N/a	34%	38%	27%
Public Policy Polling (D) (Note: Poll sponsored by Progress Action Fund, a Democratic super PAC)	March 12–13, 2024	837 (RV)	± 3.4%	46%	45%	9%
Reuters/Ipsos	March 7–13, 2024	3,356 (RV)	± 4.0%	50%	48%	2%
The Economist/YouGov	March 10–12, 2024	1,367 (RV)	± 3.5%	42%	44%	14%
Civiqs/Daily Kos	March 9–12, 2024	1,324 (RV)	± 2.8%	45%	44%	11%
Yahoo! News/YouGov	March 8–11, 2024	1,482 (A)	± 2.8%	44%	46%	10%
Forbes/HarrisX	March 8–10, 2024	2,017 (RV)	± 2.2%	48%	52%	—N/a
Morning Consult	March 8–10, 2024	6,300 (RV)	± 1.0%	43%	44%	13%
Emerson College	March 5–6, 2024	1,350 (RV)	± 2.6%	51%	49%	—N/a
Morning Consult	March 1–3, 2024	6,334 (RV)	± 1.0%	44%	43%	13%
Issues & Insights/TIPP	February 28 – March 1, 2024	1,246 (RV)	± 2.8%	43%	42%	15%
The Economist/YouGov	February 25–27, 2024	1,498 (RV)	± 3.2%	44%	44%	12%
The Economist/YouGov	February 18–20, 2024	1,360 (RV)	± 3.1%	42%	43%	15%
Quinnipiac University	February 15–19, 2024	1,421 (RV)	± 2.6%	49%	45%	6%
Marquette University	February 5–15, 2024	787 (RV)	± 4.4%	49%	51%	—N/a
Emerson College	February 13–14, 2024	1,225 (RV)	± 2.7%	44%	45%	11%
The Economist/YouGov	February 11–13, 2024	1,470 (RV)	± 3.1%	44%	44%	12%
Reuters/Ipsos	February 9–12, 2024	1,237 (A)	± 2.9%	34%	37%	29%
YouGov	February 6–9, 2024	1,000 (A)	± 4.0%	44%	45%	10%
Florida Atlantic University/Mainstreet Research	February 2–3, 2024	917 (LV)	—N/a	41%	44%	15% (Note: "Another candidate" with 11%; Undecided with 4%)
Issues & Insights/TIPP	January 31 – February 2, 2024	1,266 (RV)	± 2.8%	41%	43%	16%
NPR/PBS	January 31 – February 2, 2024	1,441 (RV)	± 3.6%	48%	47%	5%
SurveyUSA	January 31 – February 2, 2024	1,048 (LV)	± 3.7%	44%	49%	7%
The Economist/YouGov	January 28–30, 2024	1,486 (RV)	± 2.9%	43%	42%	15%
Civiqs/Daily Kos	January 27–30, 2024	1,217 (RV)	± 2.9%	44%	44%	12%
Emerson College	January 26–29, 2024	1,260 (RV)	± 2.7%	45%	46%	9%
Quinnipiac University	January 25–29, 2024	1,650 (RV)	± 2.4%	50%	44%	6%
Harvard-Harris	January 17–18, 2024	3,492 (RV)	—N/a	47%	53%	—N/a
The Messenger/HarrisX	January 16–17, 2024	1,045 (RV)	± 3.0%	48%	52%	—N/a
The Economist/YouGov	January 14–16, 2024	1,472 (RV)	± 2.8%	44%	43%	13%
CBS News	January 10–12, 2024	1,906 (LV)	± 3.1%	48%	50%	2%
Rasmussen Reports	January 7–9, 2024	968 (LV)	± 3.0%	41%	49%	10%
Reuters/Ipsos	January 3–9, 2024	4,677 (A)	± 1.5%	48%	48%	4%
Morning Consult	January 5–8, 2024	6,376 (RV)	± 1.0%	43%	42%	15%
Ipsos/With Honor PAC	January 3–7, 2024	2,027 (V)	± 2.45%	32%	34%	34%
Issues & Insights/TIPP	January 3–5, 2024	1,247 (RV)	± 2.8%	40%	41%	19%
Noble Predictive Insights	January 2–4, 2024	2,573 (RV)	± 2.0%	40%	44%	16%
The Economist/YouGov	December 29, 2023 – January 2, 2024	1,343 (RV)	± 3.2%	44%	44%	12%

==== Joe Biden vs. Donald Trump (2023) ====
Poll source	Date	Sample size	Margin of error	Joe Biden Democratic	Donald Trump Republican	Others/ Undecided
ActiVote	December 13–19, 2023	841 (LV)	± 3.4%	46%	54%	—N/a
McLaughlin & Associates	December 13–19, 2023	1,000 (LV)	—N/a	44%	47% (Note: With voters who lean towards a given candidate)	10%
The Economist/YouGov	December 16–18, 2023	1,336 (RV)	± 3.2%	43%	43%	14%
YouGov/Yahoo News	December 14–18, 2023	1,027 (RV)	—N/a	44%	44%	12%
Quinnipiac University	December 14–18, 2023	1,647 (RV)	± 2.4%	47%	46%	6%
Echelon Insights	December 12–16, 2023	1,012 (LV)	± 4.1%	48%	47%	5%
New York Times/Siena College	December 10–14, 2023	1,016 (LV)	± 3.7%	47%	45%	8%
New York Times/Siena College	December 10–14, 2023	1,016 (RV)	± 3.5%	44%	46%	9%
Beacon Research/Shaw & Company Research/Fox News	December 10–13, 2023	1,007 (RV)	± 3.0%	46%	50%	4% (Note: "Other" with 2%; "Wouldn't vote" & "Don't know" with 1%)
The Economist/YouGov Poll	December 9–12, 2023	1,332 (RV)	± 3.0%	43%	43%	14%
Hart Research Associates/Public Opinion Strategies/CNBC	December 8–12, 2023	1,002 (A)	± 3.1%	42%	48%	10%
Clarity Campaign Labs	December 7–10, 2023	1,052 (RV)	± 1.81%	45%	45%	10% (Note: "Would not vote" with 6%; "Not sure" with 4%)
Rasmussen Reports	December 6–10, 2023	892 (LV)	± 3.0%	38%	48%	14% (Note: "Some other candidate" with 10%; "Not sure" with 4%)
Cygnal (R)	December 5–7, 2023	2,000 (LV)	± 2.16%	47%	46%	7%
Marist College/NPR/PBS NewsHour	December 4–7, 2023	1,129 (RV)	± 3.7%	49%	48%	3%
Emerson College	December 4–6, 2023	1,000 (RV)	± 3%	43.2%	47.4%	9.4%
The Economist/YouGov Poll	December 2–5, 2023	1,291 (RV)	± 3.1%	42%	41%	17%
Issues & Insights/TIPP	November 29 – December 1, 2023	1,301 (RV)	± 2.8%	41%	39%	20%
HarrisX	November 22–28, 2023	4,003 (RV)	± 1.6%	42%	46%	13%
The Economist/YouGov	November 25–27, 2023	1,500 (A)	± 3.3%	44%	42%	14%
YouGov	November 20–27, 2023	1,000 (A)	± 4.1%	39%	37%	24%
Leger	November 24–26, 2023	869 (RV)	± 3.1%	44%	42%	14%
Morning Consult	November 24–26, 2023	6,527 (RV)	± 1%	43%	42%	16%
Emerson College	November 17–20, 2023	1,475 (RV)	± 2.5%	43%	47%	10%
Harris X/The Messenger	November 15–19, 2023	3,017 (RV)	± 1.8%	40%	47%	13%
Echelon Insights	November 14–17, 2023	1,006 (LV)	± 4.1%	46%	47%	8%
Reuters/Ipsos	November 13–14, 2023	1,006 (A)	± 3.8%	33%	35%	32%
YouGov/The Economist	November 11–14, 2023	1,272 (RV)	± 3.1%	42%	43%	15%
NBC News	November 10–14, 2023	1,000 (RV)	± 3.1%	44%	46%	10%
Beacon Research/Shaw & Company Research/Fox News	November 10–13, 2023	1,001 (RV)	± 3.0%	46%	50%	4%
YouGov/Yahoo! News	November 9–13, 2023	1,058 (RV)	± 2.8%	42%	44%	14%
Quinnipiac University	November 9–13, 2023	1,574 (RV)	± 2.5%	46%	48%	6%
Morning Consult	November 10–12, 2023	6,130 (RV)	± 1%	42%	43%	15%
Rasmussen Reports (R)	November 8–12, 2023	987 (LV)	± 3.0%	46%	42%	12%
Issues & Insights/TIPP	November 1–3, 2023	1,242 (RV)	± 2.8%	43%	41%	16%
CBS News/YouGov	October 30 – November 3, 2023	2,636 (A)	± 2.6%	48%	51%	1%
SSRS/CNN	October 27 – November 2, 2023	1,271 (RV)	± 3.1%	45%	49%	6%
Cygnal (R)	October 30 – November 1, 2023	2,000 (LV)	± 2.2%	47%	45%	8%
HarrisX/The Messenger	October 30 – November 1, 2023	2,021 (RV)	± 2.2%	43%	45%	12%
YouGov/The Economist	October 28–31, 2023	1,500 (A)	± 3.1%	39%	38%	23%
American Pulse Research & Polling	October 27–30, 2023	568 (LV)	± 4.1%	42%	43.5%	14.5%
Quinnipiac	October 26–30, 2023	1,610 (RV)	± 2.4%	47%	46%	7%
Morning Consult	October 20–22, 2023	5,000 (RV)	± 1%	43%	43%	15%
USA Today/Suffolk University	October 17–20, 2023	1,000 (RV)	± 3.1%	41%	41%	18%
Harvard Harris	October 18–19, 2023	2,116 (RV)	± 2%	41%	46%	14%
Emerson College	October 16–17, 2023	1,578 (RV)	± 2.4%	45%	47%	8%
Yahoo/YouGov	October 12–16, 2023	1,120 (RV)	—N/a	44%	43%	13%
Zogby Analytics	October 13–15, 2023	869 (LV)	± 3.3%	51%	49%	—N/a
Hart Research Associates/Public Opinions Strategies/CNBC	October 11–15, 2023	1,001 (A)	± 3.1%	42%	46%	12%
Grinnell College	October 10–15, 2023	784 (LV)	± 3.5%	40%	40%	20%
NPR/PBS/Marist College	October 11, 2023	1,218 (RV)	± 3.9%	49%	46%	5%
Fox News	October 6–9, 2023	1,007 (RV)	± 3.0%	49%	48%	2%
SurveyUSA	September 30 – October 3, 2023	2,330 (LV)	± 2.4%	43%	43%	14%
Echelon Insights	September 25–28, 2023	1,011 (LV)	± 4.0%	43%	46%	11%
YouGov/The Economist	September 23–26, 2023	1,500 (RV)	± 3.3%	45%	40%	15%
Marquette University	September 18–25, 2023	781 (RV)	± 4.4%	48%	51%	—N/a
Morning Consult	September 22–24, 2023	6,000 (RV)	± 1.0%	43%	42%	14%
NBC News	September 15–19, 2023	1,000 (RV)	± 3.1%	46%	46%	6%
Harvard/Harris (Note: Poll sponsored by Harvard University Center for American Political Studies)	September 13–14, 2023	2,103 (RV)	—N/a	40%	44%	16%
The Economist/YouGov	September 10–12, 2023	1,500 (A)	± 3.3%	44%	43%	12%
Fox News	September 9–12, 2023	1,012 (RV)	± 3.0%	46%	48%	1%
Morning Consult	September 2–4, 2023	6,000 (RV)	± 1.0%	44%	41%	15%
CNN/SSRS	August 25–31, 2023	1,259 (RV)	± 3.5%	46%	47%	7%
Big Data Poll	August 19–21, 2023	2,765 (LV)	—N/a	41%	42%	16%
YouGov/Yahoo News	August 17–21, 2023	1,113	± 2.7%	47%	41%	12%
Morning Consult	August 18–20, 2023	5,000 (RV)	± 1.0%	43%	41%	16%
Marist College	August 11–14, 2023	1,100 (RV)	± 3.7%	47%	46%	7%
Noble Predictive Insights/The Center Square	July 31 – August 3, 2023	2,500 (RV)	± 2.4%	44%	41%	15%
Big Village	July 24–26, 2023	1,663 (RV)	± 2.2%	44%	44%	12%
Quinnipiac University	July 13–17, 2023	1,809 (RV)	± 2.3%	49%	44%	7%
YouGov/Yahoo News	July 13–17, 2023	1,098	± 2.7%	47%	43%	10%
Marquette University	July 7–12, 2023	788 (RV)	± 4.2%	50%	50%	—N/a
Morning Consult	July 7–9, 2023	6,000 (RV)	± 1.0%	44%	43%	13%
HarrisX/The Messenger	July 5–6, 2023	915 (RV)	± 3.2%	44%	44%	12%
Morning Consult	June 23–25, 2023	6,000 (RV)	± 1.0%	41%	44%	15%
HarrisX/The Messenger	June 19–23, 2023	2,875 (RV)	± 1.8%	43%	45%	12%
Emerson College	June 19–20, 2023	1,015 (RV)	± 3.0%	44%	43%	13%
NBC News	June 16–20, 2023	1,000 (RV)	± 3.1%	49%	45%	6%
Quinnipiac University	June 8–12, 2023	1,735 (RV)	± 2.4%	48%	44%	8%
Morning Consult	June 9–11, 2023	6,000 (RV)	± 1.0%	42%	42%	16%
YouGov	May 25–30, 2023	1,015 (RV)	± 2.7%	48%	41%	11%
Echelon Insights	May 22–25, 2023	1,035 (LV)	—N/a	46%	44%	10%
Quinnipiac University	May 18–22, 2023	1,616 (RV)	—N/a	48%	46%	6%
Harvard/Harris	May 17–18, 2023	2,004 (RV)	–	40%	47%	13%
Marquette University	May 8–18, 2023	791 (RV)	± 4.1%	47%	52%	—N/a
Redfield & Wilton Strategies	May 17, 2023	1,117 (LV)	—N/a	44%	43%	13%
YouGov/The Economist	May 13–16, 2023	1,302 (RV)	± 2.8%	42%	44%	14%
Premise	May 12–15, 2023	1,591 (RV)	—N/a	41%	44%	15%
Morning Consult	May 12–14, 2023	6,000 (RV)	± 1.0%	44%	41%	15%
WPA Intelligence	May 10–13, 2023	1,571 (RV)	± 2.5%	47%	40%	13%
YouGov/Yahoo News	May 5–8, 2023	1,060 (RV)	± 2.7%	45%	43%	12%
Morning Consult	May 5–7, 2023	6,000 (RV)	—N/a	44%	42%	14%
ABC News/The Washington Post	April 28 – May 5, 2023	900 (RV)	± 4.0%	39%	45%	16%
YouGov/The Economist	April 29 – May 2, 2023	1,357 (RV)	± 3.0%	46%	46%	8%
Emerson College	April 24–25, 2023	1,100 (RV)	—N/a	43%	41%	16%
Morning Consult	April 21–23, 2023	6,000 (RV)	—N/a	43%	42%	15%
Cygnal (R)	April 18–20, 2023	2,500 (LV)	± 1.94%	46%	45%	9%
Harvard/Harris	April 18–19, 2023	1,845 (RV)	—N/a	40%	45%	15%
YouGov/The Economist	April 15–18, 2023	1,316 (RV)	—N/a	43%	44%	13%
Premise	April 14–17, 2023	1,485 (RV)	—N/a	42%	44%	14%
YouGov/Yahoo News	April 14–17, 2023	1,027 (RV)	—N/a	46%	42%	12%
Morning Consult	April 14–16, 2023	6,000 (RV)	± 1.0%	43%	40%	17%
YouGov/The Economist	April 8–11, 2023	1,322 (RV)	± 2.9%	43%	44%	13%
Morning Consult	April 7–9, 2023	5,000 (RV)	± 1.0%	43%	42%	15%
Redfield & Wilton Strategies	April 4, 2023	1,180 (LV)	—N/a	44%	43%	13%
YouGov	April 1–4, 2023	1,319 (RV)	± 3.0%	42%	44%	14%
Premise	March 31 – April 3, 2023	1,562 (RV)	—N/a	44%	43%	13%
Rasmussen Reports	March 30 – April 3, 2023	971 (LV)	± 3.0%	40%	47%	13%
Morning Consult	March 31 – April 2, 2023	5,000 (RV)	± 1.0%	42%	41%	17%
McLaughlin & Associates (R) (Note: Poll sponsored by Trump's campaign)	March 31 – April 1, 2023	1,000 (LV)	± 3.1%	43%	47%	10%
YouGov/Yahoo News	March 30–31, 2023	729 (RV)	± 3.3%	45%	43%	12%
Echelon Insights	March 27–29, 2023	1,007 (LV)	± 3.8%	47%	44%	9%
Cygnal (R)	March 26–27, 2023	2,550 (LV)	± 1.9%	47%	45%	8%
Quinnipiac University	March 23–27, 2023	1,600 (RV)	± 2.5%	48%	46%	6%
Morning Consult	March 24–26, 2023	5,000 (RV)	± 1.0%	43%	42%	15%
Harvard/Harris	March 22–23, 2023	2,905 (RV)	—N/a	41%	45%	14%
Marquette University	March 12–22, 2023	863 (RV)	± 4.0%	38%	38%	24%
Premise	March 16–21, 2023	1,509 (RV)	—N/a	41%	47%	12%
Redfield & Wilton Strategies	March 20, 2023	1,250 (LV)	—N/a	44%	44%	12%
YouGov/Yahoo News	March 16–20, 2023	1,059 (RV)	± 2.7%	45%	43%	12%
McLaughlin & Associates	March 16–20, 2023	1,000 (LV)	—N/a	43%	48%	9%
Morning Consult	March 17–19, 2023	5,000 (RV)	± 1.0%	44%	41%	15%
Quinnipiac University	March 9–13, 2023	1,635 (RV)	± 2.4%	49%	45%	6%
Morning Consult	March 10–12, 2023	5,000 (RV)	± 1.0%	43%	42%	15%
Wick Insights	March 6–9, 2023	1,125 (LV)	—N/a	45%	43%	12%
Redfield & Wilton Strategies	March 7–8, 2023	1,201 (LV)	—N/a	44%	44%	12%
Premise	March 4–7, 2023	1,621 (RV)	—N/a	44%	45%	11%
Morning Consult	March 3–5, 2023	5,000 (RV)	± 1.0%	42%	43%	15%
Cygnal (R)	February 24–27, 2023	2,424 (LV)	± 2.0%	47%	45%	8%
YouGov/Yahoo News	February 23–27, 2023	1,014 (RV)	± 2.7%	43%	45%	12%
Susquehanna	February 19–26, 2023	800 (RV)	—N/a	52%	39%	—N/a
Emerson College	February 24–25, 2023	1,060 (RV)	± 2.9%	42%	46%	12%
Morning Consult	February 23–25, 2023	6,000 (RV)	—N/a	43%	41%	16%
Echelon Insights	February 21–23, 2023	1,023 (LV)	—N/a	47%	44%	9%
McLaughlin & Associates	February 17–23, 2023	1,000 (LV)	—N/a	44%	48%	8%
Redfield & Wilton Strategies	February 19, 2023	1,102 (LV)	—N/a	43%	42%	15%
Morning Consult	February 17–19, 2023	6,000 (RV)	± 1.0%	42%	41%	17%
Premise	February 16–19, 2023	1,717 (RV)	—N/a	44%	42%	14%
Morning Consult	February 16–19, 2023	2,000 (RV)	± 1.5%	42%	41%	17%
Harvard/Harris	February 15–16, 2023	1,838 (RV)	—N/a	41%	46%	13%
Quinnipac University	February 9–14, 2023	1,429 (RV)	± 2.6%	48%	46%	6%
Ipsos/Reuters	February 6–13, 2023	915 (RV)	± 4.0%	39%	42%	19%
Morning Consult	February 10–12, 2023	6,000 (RV)	—N/a	43%	41%	16%
Rasmussen Reports	February 8–12, 2023	900 (LV)	± 3.0%	45%	42%	13%
Public Policy Polling (D)	February 10–11, 2023	1,056 (RV)	—N/a	49%	45%	6%
YouGov/Yahoo News	February 2–6, 2023	1,063 (RV)	± 2.8%	47%	41%	12%
Morning Consult	February 3–5, 2023	6,000 (RV)	± 1.0%	43%	40%	17%
ABC News/The Washington Post	January 27 – February 1, 2023	895 (RV)	—N/a	45%	48%	7%
Redfield & Wilton Strategies	January 28–29, 2023	1,139 (LV)	—N/a	39%	41%	20%
Morning Consult	January 27–29, 2023	6,000 (RV)	± 1.0%	43%	40%	17%
Echelon Insights	January 23–25, 2023	1,024 (LV)	± 3.9%	45%	42%	13%
McLaughlin & Associates	January 19–24, 2023	1,000 (LV)	—N/a	43%	48%	9%
Morning Consult	January 20–22, 2023	6,000 (RV)	± 1.0%	44%	41%	15%
Emerson College	January 19–21, 2023	1,015 (RV)	± 2.5%	41%	44%	15%
Cygnal (R)	January 19–20, 2023	2,529 (LV)	± 2.0%	47%	44%	9%
Marquette University	January 9–20, 2023	790 (RV)	± 4.0%	40%	40%	20%
Harvard/Harris	January 18–19, 2023	2,050 (RV)	—N/a	41%	46%	13%
YouGov/The Economist	January 14–17, 2023	1,314 (RV)	± 3.0%	46%	42%	12%
Redfield & Wilton Strategies	January 16, 2023	1,458 (LV)	—N/a	39%	41%	20%
YouGov/YahooNews	January 12–16, 2023	1,028 (RV)	± 2.7%	46%	40%	14%
Morning Consult	January 10–12, 2023	6,000 (RV)	± 1.0%	43%	40%	17%
Morning Consult	January 6–8, 2023	7,500 (RV)	± 1.0%	44%	41%	15%
WPA Intelligence	January 2–8, 2023	1,035 (LV)	± 3.0%	49%	41%	10%

==== Joe Biden vs. Donald Trump (2022) ====
Poll source	Date	Sample size	Margin of error	Joe Biden Democratic	Donald Trump Republican	Others/ Undecided
Morning Consult	December 31, 2022 – January 2, 2023	8,000 (RV)	± 1.0%	44%	40%	16%
Data for Progress	December 22–29, 2022	1,189 (LV)	± 3.0%	47%	45%	8%
YouGov/Yahoo News	December 15–19, 2022	1,041 (RV)	± 2.7%	45%	41%	14%
Morning Consult	December 16–18, 2022	7,000 (RV)	± 1.0%	43%	41%	16%
Harvard/Harris	December 14–15, 2022	1,851 (RV)	—N/a	40%	45%	15%
Echelon Insights	December 12–14, 2022	1,021 (LV)	± 3.7%	46%	44%	10%
McLaughlin & Associates	December 9–14, 2022	1,000 (LV)	—N/a	45%	48%	7%
Morning Consult	December 9–11, 2022	7,000 (RV)	± 1.0%	43%	41%	16%
Suffolk University	December 7–11, 2022	1,000 (RV)	± 3.1%	47%	40%	13%
Fabrizio Ward/Impact Research	December 3–7, 2022	1,500 (RV)	± 2.5%	45%	43%	12%
Redfield & Wilton Strategies	December 5, 2022	1,162 (LV)	—N/a	41%	41%	18%
YouGov/Yahoo News	December 1–5, 2022	1,204 (RV)	± 2.6%	45%	42%	13%
Marquette University	November 15–22, 2022	840 (RV)	± 4.0%	44%	34%	22%
Emerson College	November 18–19, 2022	1,380 (RV)	± 2.5%	45%	41%	14%
Echelon Insights	November 17–19, 2022	1,036 (LV)	± 3.8%	42%	45%	13%
Redfield & Wilton Strategies	November 17, 2022	1,203 (LV)	—N/a	43%	42%	15%
Harvard/Harris	November 16–17, 2022	2,212 (RV)	—N/a	42%	44%	14%
Léger	November 11–13, 2022	1,007 (A)	—N/a	36%	33%	31%
Rasmussen Reports	November 8–9, 2022	1,767 (LV)	± 2.0%	44%	47%	9%
Democracy Corps/GQR	November 6–8, 2022	1,000 (RV)	—N/a	46%	48%	6%
Morning Consult	November 2–7, 2022	3,980 (RV)	± 3.0%	44%	43%	13%
Redfield & Wilton Strategies	November 2, 2022	1,084 (LV)	—N/a	39%	44%	17%
YouGov/Yahoo News	October 27–31, 2022	1,172 (RV)	± 2.7%	48%	42%	10%
Benenson Strategy Group	October 27–30, 2022	1,000 (V)	± 3.1%	45%	43%	12%
Echelon Insights	October 24–26, 2022	1,014 (LV)	± 3.8%	45%	46%	9%
Fabrizio Ward/Impact Research	October 22–26, 2022	1,500 (RV)	—N/a	46%	46%	8%
Suffolk University	October 19–24, 2022	1,000 (LV)	± 3.1%	46%	42%	12%
Emerson College	October 18–19, 2022	1,000 (RV)	± 3.0%	43%	40%	17%
YouGov/Yahoo News	October 13–17, 2022	1,209 (RV)	± 2.7%	46%	44%	10%
McLaughlin & Associates	October 12–17, 2022	1,000 (LV)	—N/a	44%	50%	6%
Rasmussen Reports	October 12–13, 2022	1,000 (LV)	± 3.0%	40%	44%	16%
Harvard/Harris	October 12–13, 2022	2,010 (RV)	—N/a	43%	45%	12%
Redfield & Wilton Strategies	October 12, 2022	1,110 (LV)	—N/a	40%	41%	19%
Siena College/The New York Times	October 9–12, 2022	792 (LV)	—N/a	44%	45%	11%
John Zogby Strategies	October 5, 2022	1,006 (LV)	± 3.2%	45%	41%	14%
Redfield & Wilton Strategies	October 2–3, 2022	1,128 (LV)	—N/a	43%	41%	16%
YouGov/Yahoo News	September 23–27, 2022	1,138 (RV)	± 2.7%	47%	45%	8%
McLaughlin & Associates	September 17–22, 2022	1,000 (LV)	—N/a	45%	49%	6%
Emerson College	September 20–21, 2022	1,368 (LV)	± 2.6%	45%	44%	11%
ABC News/The Washington Post	September 18–21, 2022	908 (RV)	± 3.5%	46%	48%	6%
Premise	September 16–19, 2022	1,703 (A)	—N/a	51%	49%	—N/a
Echelon Insights	September 16–19, 2022	1,056 (LV)	± 3.8%	47%	44%	9%
Refield & Wilton Strategies	September 14–15, 2022	1,163 (LV)	—N/a	43%	40%	17%
Marquette University	September 6–14, 2022	1,282 (RV)	± 3.6%	42%	36%	22%
Siena College/The New York Times	September 6–14, 2022	1,399 (RV)	—N/a	45%	42%	13%
Harvard/Harris	September 7–8, 2022	1,854 (RV)	—N/a	42%	45%	13%
Echelon Insights	August 31 – September 7, 2022	1,228 (LV)	± 3.5%	46%	45%	9%
YouGov/Yahoo News	September 2–6, 2022	1,247 (RV)	± 2.6%	48%	42%	10%
Premise	September 2–5, 2022	1,185 (RV)	—N/a	51%	49%	—N/a
Redfield & Wilton Strategies	August 28, 2022	1,050 (LV)	—N/a	40%	42%	18%
Fabrizio Ward/Impact Research	August 17–25, 2022	1,313 (RV)	—N/a	50%	44%	6%
Emerson College	August 23–24, 2022	1,000 (RV)	± 3.0%	43%	42%	15%
McLaughlin & Associates	August 20–24, 2022	1,000 (LV)	—N/a	45%	49%	6%
Echelon Insights	August 19–22, 2022	1,054 (LV)	± 3.6%	47%	42%	11%
YouGov/Yahoo News	August 18–22, 2022	1,185 (RV)	—N/a	46%	42%	12%
Redfield and Wilton Strategies	August 17, 2022	1,156 (LV)	—N/a	39%	42%	19%
YouGov/Yahoo News	July 28 – August 1, 2022	1,152 (RV)	—N/a	45%	42%	13%
Redfield and Wilton Strategies	July 29, 2022	1,094 (LV)	—N/a	35%	42%	23%
Harvard/Harris	July 27–28, 2022	1,885 (RV)	—N/a	41%	45%	14%
Rasmussen Reports	July 26–27, 2022	1,000 (LV)	± 3.0%	40%	46%	14%
Suffolk University	July 22–25, 2022	1,000 (RV)	± 3.1%	45%	41%	14%
Emerson College	July 19–20, 2022	1,078 (RV)	± 2.9%	43%	46%	11%
Echelon Insights	July 15–18, 2022	1,022 (LV)	—N/a	46%	44%	10%
The Trafalgar Group (R)	July 11–14, 2022	1,085 (LV)	± 2.9%	43%	48%	10%
YouGov/Yahoo News	July 8–11, 2022	1,261 (RV)	—N/a	44%	43%	13%
Redfield and Wilton Strategies	July 9, 2022	1,078 (LV)	—N/a	41%	43%	16%
The New York Times/Siena College	July 5–7, 2022	849 (RV)	± 4.1%	44%	41%	14%
Harvard/Harris	June 28–29, 2022	1,308 (RV)	—N/a	40%	43%	17%
Emerson College	June 28–29, 2022	1,271 (RV)	± 2.7%	39%	44%	17%
YouGov/Yahoo News	June 24–27, 2022	1,239 (RV)	—N/a	46%	43%	11%
McLaughlin & Associates	June 17–22, 2022	1,000 (LV)	—N/a	44%	49%	7%
Echelon Insights	June 17–20, 2022	1,030 (LV)	—N/a	45%	43%	12%
Redfield and Wilton Strategies	June 15, 2022	1,064 (LV)	—N/a	38%	41%	21%
YouGov/Yahoo News	June 10–13, 2022	1,243 (RV)	—N/a	42%	44%	14%
Redfield and Wilton Strategies	May 30, 2022	1,173 (LV)	—N/a	38%	42%	20%
Emerson College	May 24–25, 2022	1,148 (RV)	± 2.8%	42%	44%	14%
Echelon Insights	May 20–23, 2022	1,020 (LV)	—N/a	45%	44%	11%
YouGov/Yahoo News	May 19–22, 2022	1,360 (RV)	—N/a	44%	42%	14%
Harvard/Harris	May 18–19, 2022	1,963 (RV)	—N/a	42%	45%	13%
Redfield and Wilton Strategies	May 17, 2022	1,120 (LV)	—N/a	39%	42%	19%
Rasmussen Reports	April 28 – May 2, 2022	1,004 (LV)	± 3.0%	36%	50%	14%
Redfield and Wilton Strategies	May 1, 2022	1,096 (LV)	—N/a	40%	44%	16%
Emerson College	April 25–26, 2022	1,000 (RV)	± 3.0%	42%	43%	15%
McLaughlin & Associates	April 22–26, 2022	1,000 (LV)	—N/a	43%	50%	7%
Morning Consult	April 22–25, 2022	2,004 (RV)	± 2.0%	45%	44%	11%
InsiderAdvantage (R)	April 21–23, 2022	750 (RV)	± 3.6%	43%	47%	10%
YouGov/Yahoo News	April 19–22, 2022	1,187 (RV)	—N/a	43%	41%	16%
Harvard/Harris	April 20–21, 2022	1,966 (RV)	—N/a	43%	45%	12%
Echelon Insights	April 18–20, 2022	1,001 (LV)	—N/a	45%	44%	11%
Redfield and Wilton Strategies	April 18, 2022	1,500 (LV)	—N/a	41%	43%	16%
YouGov/Yahoo News	March 31 – April 4, 2022	1,233 (RV)	—N/a	45%	40%	15%
Redfield and Wilton Strategies	April 3, 2022	1,205 (LV)	—N/a	38%	43%	19%
Marquette Law School	March 14–24, 2022	1,004 (A)	± 4.0%	41%	37%	22%
Harvard/Harris	March 23–24, 2022	1,990 (RV)	—N/a	41%	47%	12%
McLaughlin & Associates	March 17–22, 2022	1,000 (LV)	—N/a	46%	49%	5%
Echelon Insights	March 18–21, 2022	1,050 (RV)	—N/a	46%	44%	10%
University of Massachusetts Lowell	March 15–21, 2022	873 (RV)	± 3.7%	44%	42%	14%
Redfield and Wilton Strategies	March 20, 2022	1,193 (LV)	—N/a	41%	41%	18%
Emerson College	March 18–20, 2022	1,023 (RV)	± 3.0%	42%	45%	13%
YouGov/Yahoo News	March 10–14, 2022	1,225 (RV)	—N/a	47%	39%	14%
Redfield and Wilton Strategies	March 8, 2022	1,194 (LV)	—N/a	40%	42%	18%
Wall Street Journal	March 2–7, 2022	1,500 (RV)	—N/a	45%	45%	9%
Schoen Cooperman Research	March 2–6, 2022	800 (LV)	—N/a	44%	44%	12%
YouGov/Yahoo News	February 24–27, 2022	1,532 (A)	± 2.9%	40%	39%	21%
NewsNation	February 23–24, 2022	1,046 (RV)	—N/a	37%	41%	22%
Harvard/Harris	February 23–24, 2022	2,026 (RV)	—N/a	42%	48%	10%
Echelon Insights	February 19–23, 2022	1,078 (RV)	—N/a	45%	43%	12%
Redfield and Wilton Strategies	February 23, 2022	1,367 (LV)	—N/a	42%	38%	20%
McLaughlin & Associates	February 16–22, 2022	1,000 (LV)	—N/a	45%	48%	7%
Emerson College	February 19–20, 2022	1,138 (RV)	± 2.8%	44%	48%	8%
Redfield and Wilton Strategies	February 6, 2022	1,406 (LV)	—N/a	41%	41%	18%
YouGov/Yahoo News	January 20–24, 2022	1,568 (A)	± 2.8%	42%	40%	18%
Morning Consult	January 22–23, 2022	2,005 (RV)	± 2.0%	45%	44%	11%
Echelon Insights	January 21–23, 2022	1,098 (RV)	—N/a	47%	43%	10%
Marquette Law School (Note: Archived January 28, 2022, at the Wayback Machine)	January 10–21, 2022	1,000 (A)	—N/a	43%	33%	24%
Harvard/Harris	January 19–20, 2022	1,815 (RV)	—N/a	40%	46%	14%
McLaughlin & Associates	January 13–18, 2022	1,000 (LV)	—N/a	44%	49%	7%
Redfield and Wilton Strategies	January 8–9, 2022	1,430 (LV)	—N/a	39%	38%	23%
PMC/John Bolton Super Pac	January 6, 2022	1,000 (LV)	± 3.1%	45%	44%	11%
Rasmussen Reports	January 5, 2022	1,015 (LV)	± 3.0%	40%	46%	14%

==== Joe Biden vs. Donald Trump (2021) ====
Poll source	Date	Sample size	Margin of error	Joe Biden Democratic	Donald Trump Republican	Others/ Undecided
InsiderAdvantage (R)	December 17–19, 2021	750 (RV)	± 3.6%	41%	49%	10%
Redfield and Wilton Strategies	December 18, 2021	1,411 (LV)	—N/a	34%	39%	27%
YouGov/Yahoo News	December 9–13, 2021	1,558 (A)	—N/a	47%	41%	12%
Echelon Insights	December 9–13, 2021	1,098 (RV)	—N/a	47%	44%	9%
Redfield and Wilton Strategies	December 5, 2021	1,387 (LV)	—N/a	38%	42%	20%
Harvard/Harris	November 30 – December 2, 2021	1,989 (RV)	—N/a	45%	48%	7%
Rasmussen Reports	November 22–23, 2021	1,200 (LV)	± 3.0%	32%	45%	23%
Wall Street Journal	November 16–22, 2021	1,500 (RV)	—N/a	46%	45%	10%
Echelon Insights	November 12–18, 2021	1,013 (RV)	—N/a	45%	45%	10%
McLaughlin & Associates	November 11–16, 2021	1,000 (LV)	—N/a	44%	49%	7%
Redfield and Wilton Strategies	November 15, 2021	1,500 (RV)	—N/a	35%	41%	24%
Marquette Law School (Note: Archived November 20, 2021, at the Wayback Machine)	November 1–10, 2021	1,004 (A)	—N/a	42%	34%	24%
YouGov/Yahoo News	November 4–8, 2021	1,673 (A)	—N/a	43%	39%	18%
Suffolk University	November 3–5, 2021	1,000 (RV)	± 3.1%	40%	44%	16%
Emerson College	November 3–4, 2021	1,000 (RV)	± 3.0%	43%	45%	12%
Redfield and Wilton Strategies	October 31, 2021	1,387 (LV)	—N/a	42%	42%	16%
Harvard/Harris	October 26–28, 2021	1,578 (LV)	—N/a	45%	46%	9%
YouGov/Yahoo News	October 19–21, 2021	1,704 (A)	—N/a	43%	40%	17%
Echelon Insights	October 15–19, 2021	1,098 (RV)	—N/a	48%	42%	10%
Redfield and Wilton Strategies	October 17, 2021	1,366 (LV)	—N/a	42%	40%	18%
Selzer and Company/Grinnell College	October 13–17, 2021	745 (LV)	± 3.6%	40%	40%	19%
Redfield and Wilton Strategies	October 4–6, 2021	1,345 (LV)	—N/a	43%	41%	16%
Echelon Insights	September 17–23, 2021	1,005 (RV)	—N/a	50%	39%	11%
Rasmussen Reports	September 21–22, 2021	1,000 (LV)	± 3.0%	41%	51%	8%
Redfield and Wilton Strategies	September 19–20, 2021	1,330 (LV)	—N/a	42%	40%	18%
McLaughlin & Associates	September 9–14, 2021	1,000 (LV)	—N/a	47%	50%	3%
Redfield and Wilton Strategies	September 4–5, 2021	1,357 (LV)	—N/a	45%	42%	13%
Emerson College	August 30 – September 1, 2021	1,200 (RV)	± 2.7%	46%	47%	7%
Rasmussen Reports	August 16–17, 2021	1,000 (LV)	± 3.0%	37%	43%	20%
YouGov/Yahoo News	July 30 – August 2, 2021	1,552 (A)	—N/a	47%	37%	16%
PMC/John Bolton Super Pac	July 8, 2021	1,000 (LV)	—N/a	46%	43%	11%
YouGov/Yahoo News	June 22–24, 2021	1,592 (A)	—N/a	47%	35%	18%
YouGov/Yahoo News	May 24–26, 2021	1,588 (A)	—N/a	46%	36%	18%
YouGov/Yahoo News	May 11–13, 2021	1,561 (A)	—N/a	48%	36%	16%
Ipsos/Reuters	April 12–16, 2021	1,106 (A)	—N/a	45%	28%	27%
PMC/John Bolton Super Pac	April 3–7, 2021	1,000 (LV)	—N/a	46%	42%	12%

==== Joe Biden vs. Donald Trump vs. Robert F. Kennedy Jr. vs. Cornel West vs. Chase Oliver vs. Jill Stein ====
Poll source	Date	Sample size	Margin of error	Joe Biden Democratic	Donald Trump Republican	Robert F. Kennedy Jr. Independent	Cornel West Independent	Chase Oliver Libertarian	Jill Stein Green	Others/ Undecided
	July 21, 2024	Biden withdraws from the race.								
NPR/PBS News/Marist College	July 9–10, 2024	1,174 (RV)	± 3.3%	42%	43%	8%	3%	<1%	2%	2%
NBC News	July 7–9, 2024	800 (RV)	± 3.5%	37%	40%	10%	1%	2%	3%	7%
Wall Street Journal	June 29 – July 2, 2024	1,500 (RV)	± 2.5%	36%	42%	7%	2%	1%	2%	11%
New York Times/Siena College	June 28 – July 2, 2024	1,532 (LV)	± 2.3%	37%	42%	8%	<0.5%	1%	2%	9%
CNN/SSRS	June 28–30, 2024	1,045 (RV)	± 3.5%	35%	41%	14%	2%	1%	3%	4%
USA Today/Suffolk University	June 28–30, 2024	1,000 (RV)	± 3.1%	38%	41%	8%	1%	1%	1%	10%
New York Times/Siena College	June 20–25, 2024	1,226 (LV)	± 3.2%	37%	40%	7%	<0.5%	1%	2%	12%
Quinnipiac University	June 20–24, 2024	1,405 (RV)	± 2.6%	37%	43%	11%	2%	1%	2%	4%
McLaughlin & Associates	June 18–24, 2024	1,000 (LV)	—N/a	37%	39%	10%	2%	1%	2%	9%
Marist College	June 10–12, 2024	1,184 (RV)	± 3.8%	41%	42%	11%	3%	1%	1%	1%
Data for Progress (D)/Zeteo	May 1–2, 2024	1,240 (LV)	± 3.0%	40%	41%	12%	1%	0%	1%	5%
Data for Progress (D)	March 27–29, 2024	1,200 (LV)	± 3.0%	41%	42%	8%	1%	1%	1%	6%

==== Joe Biden vs. Donald Trump vs. Robert F. Kennedy Jr. vs. Cornel West vs. Jill Stein ====
Poll source	Date	Sample size	Margin of error	Joe Biden Democratic	Donald Trump Republican	Robert F. Kennedy Jr. Independent	Cornel West Independent	Jill Stein Green	Others/ Undecided
	July 21, 2024	Biden withdraws from the race.							
The Center Square/Noble Predictive Insights	July 8–11, 2024	2,300 (LV)	± 2.1%	40%	43%	7%	1%	1%	7%
Rasmussen Reports	July 7–11, 2024	1,847 (LV)	± 2.0%	40%	46%	7%	1%	1%	5%
NPR/PBS News/Marist College	July 9–10, 2024	1,174 (RV)	± 3.3%	42%	43%	8%	3%	2%	2%
Fox News	July 7–10, 2024	1,210 (RV)	± 3.0%	41%	44%	10%	1%	3%	1%
The Economist/YouGov	July 7–9, 2024	1,443 (RV)	± 3.1%	40%	43%	4%	1%	1%	11%
ABC News/The Washington Post/Ipsos	July 5–9, 2024	2,041 (RV)	± 2.0%	42%	43%	9%	2%	2%	2%
Emerson College	July 7–8, 2024	1,370 (RV)	± 2.6%	40%	44%	6%	1%	1%	8%
Lord Ashcroft	June 28 – July 7, 2024	4,347 (LV)	—N/a	41%	39%	9%	1%	1%	9%
Cygnal (R)	July 1–2, 2024	1,500 (LV)	± 2.53%	38%	44%	7%	2%	2%	7%
The Economist/YouGov	June 30 – July 2, 2024	1,392 (RV)	± 3.1%	40%	42%	5%	1%	1%	11%
CBS News/YouGov	June 28 – July 2, 2024	2,808 (LV)	—N/a	40%	44%	11%	2%	3%	—N/a
Harvard/Harris	June 28–30, 2024	2,090 (RV)	—N/a	38%	46%	13%	2%	2%	—N/a
Forbes/HarrisX	June 28–30, 2024	1,500 (RV)	± 2.5%	37%	42%	16%	2%	3%	—N/a
Issues & Insights/TIPP	June 26–28, 2024	1,244 (RV)	± 2.8%	40%	39%	10%	2%	1%	7%
AtlasIntel/CNN Brazil	June 26–28, 2024	1,634 (RV)	± 2.0%	40%	46%	10%	1%	1%	2%
The Economist/YouGov	June 23–25, 2024	1,406 (RV)	± 3.0%	42%	42%	4%	1%	0%	10%
Leger/New York Post	June 22–24, 2024	878 (LV)	± 3.01%	38%	38%	7%	2%	2%	13%
The Economist/YouGov	June 16–18, 2024	1,396 (RV)	± 3.1%	42%	42%	4%	1%	1%	10%
Fox News	June 14–17, 2024	1,095 (RV)	± 3.0%	43%	42%	10%	2%	2%	1%
New York Post/YouGov	June 11–14, 2024	1,011 (RV)	± 3.6%	41%	39%	3%	1%	1%	16%
Echelon Insights	June 10–12, 2024	1,013 (LV)	± 3.7%	42%	43%	7%	2%	2%	3%
The Economist/YouGov	June 9–11, 2024	1,399 (RV)	± 3.2%	40%	42%	3%	1%	1%	9%
Cygnal (R)	June 4–6, 2024	1,500 (LV)	± 2.53%	38%	41%	8%	2%	2%	8%
Emerson College	June 4–5, 2024	1,000 (RV)	± 3.0%	38.4%	44.4%	5.9%	1%	1.2%	9.1%
The Economist/YouGov	June 2–4, 2024	1,000 (RV)	± 3.1%	42%	42%	3%	1%	1%	10%
Issues & Insights/TIPP	May 29–31, 2024	1,675 (RV)	± 2.5%	38%	38%	10%	1%	2%	9%
Leger/The Canadian Press	May 24–26, 2024	883 (LV)	± 3.09%	37%	39%	9%	2%	2%	11%
The Economist/YouGov	May 25–28, 2024	1,547 (RV)	± 3.1%	40%	41%	4%	1%	1%	13%
McLaughlin & Associates	May 21–23, 2024	1,000 (LV)	—N/a	38%	42%	9%	2%	2%	7% (Note: Lars Mapstead (L) with 1%)
Emerson College	May 21–23, 2024	1,100 (RV)	± 2.9%	38.7%	43.8%	5.9%	1.0%	0.9%	9.6%
The Economist/YouGov	May 19–21, 2024	1,560 (RV)	± 2.6%	40%	41%	5%	1%	1%	12%
Quinnipiac University	May 16–20, 2024	1,374 (RV)	± 2.6%	41%	38%	14%	2%	2%	3%
Cygnal (R)	May 14–16, 2024	1,500 (LV)	± 2.53%	38%	41%	9%	2%	2%	8%
Echelon Insights	May 13–16, 2024	1,023 (LV)	± 3.7%	38%	43%	9%	1%	3%	6%
The Economist/YouGov	May 12–14, 2024	1,586 (RV)	± 2.9%	41%	42%	3%	1%	1%	11%
Fox News	May 10–13, 2024	1,126 (RV)	± 3.0%	40%	43%	11%	2%	2%	2%
Issues & Insights/TIPP	May 1–3, 2024	1,264 (RV)	± 2.8%	39%	38%	12%	1%	1%	9%
USA Today	April 30 – May 3, 2024	1,000 (RV)	± 3.1%	37%	37%	8%	2%	1%	15%
The Economist/YouGov	April 28–30, 2024	1,479 (RV)	± 2.9%	43%	44%	3%	1%	1%	8%
Leger/The Canadian Press	April 26–28, 2024	887 (LV)	± 3.09%	38%	41%	7%	1%	2%	11%
ABC News/Ipsos	April 25–30, 2024	2,260 (A)	± 2.0%	42%	42%	12%	2%	1%	1%
HarrisX/Harris	April 24–25, 2024	1,961 (RV)	± 2.0%	39%	45%	12%	2%	1%	—N/a
The Economist/YouGov	April 21–23, 2024	1,470 (RV)	± 3.3%	43%	43%	3%	0%	0%	11%
CNN/SSRS	April 18–23, 2024	967 (RV)	± 3.4%	33%	42%	16%	4%	3%	3%
Quinnipiac University	April 18–22, 2024	1,429 (RV)	± 2.6%	37%	37%	16%	3%	3%	4%
Marist College	April 17–18, 2024	1,047 (RV)	± 3.6%	43%	38%	13%	2%	2%	2%
Hart Research Associates/Public Opinion Strategies/NBC News	April 12–16, 2024	1,000 (RV)	± 3.1%	39%	37%	13%	2%	3%	6%
Emerson College	April 16–17, 2024	1,308 (RV)	± 2.6%	40%	44%	8%	1%	0%	7%
The Economist/YouGov	April 14–16, 2024	1,358 (RV)	± 3.1%	44%	44%	3%	1%	0%	8%
Echelon Insights	April 12–14, 2024	1,020 (LV)	± 3.9%	41%	40%	11%	2%	2%	4%
NY Times/Siena	April 7–11, 2024	1,059 (LV)	± 3.5%	42%	43%	2%	<0.5%	<0.5%	12%
The Economist/YouGov	April 6–9, 2024	1,583 (RV)	± 2.9%	42%	43%	3%	1%	0%	12%
Issues & Insights/TIPP	April 3–5, 2024	1,265 (RV)	± 2.8%	38%	38%	11%	2%	1%	11%
Emerson College	April 2–3, 2024	1,438 (RV)	± 2.5%	42%	43%	8%	1%	1%	6%
The Economist/YouGov	March 30 – April 2, 2024	1,604 (RV)	± 3.1%	43%	43%	2%	1%	0%	9%
Trafalgar Group (R)	March 29–31, 2024	1,092 (LV)	± 2.9%	40%	43%	11%	2%	1%	3%
NPR/PBS	March 25–28, 2024	1,199 (LV)	—N/a	43%	41%	11%	1%	2%	2%
Quinnipiac University	March 21–25, 2024	1,407 (RV)	—N/a	38%	39%	13%	3%	4%	3%
The Economist/YouGov	March 16–19, 2024	1,510 (RV)	—N/a	44%	43%	2%	1%	0%	10%
Noble Predictive Insights/The Center Square	March 11–15, 2024	2,510 (RV)	± 2.0%	40%	43%	7%	1%	1%	7%
Emerson College	March 5–6, 2024	1,350 (RV)	± 2.6%	42%	43%	6%	2%	1%	7%
Quinnipiac University	February 15–19, 2024	1,421 (RV)	± 2.6%	38%	37%	15%	3%	3%	3%
Emerson College	January 26–29, 2024	1,260 (RV)	± 2.7%	39%	41%	5%	1%	1%	13%
Quinnipiac University	January 25–29, 2024	1,650 (RV)	—N/a	39%	37%	14%	3%	2%	5%
Quinnipiac University	December 14–18, 2023	1,647 (RV)	± 2.4%	36%	38%	16%	3%	3%	5% (Note: "Undecided" with 3%; "Someone else" & "Wouldn't vote" with 1%)
Beacon Research/Shaw & Company Research/Fox News	December 10–13, 2023	1,007 (RV)	± 3.0%	37%	41%	14%	3%	2%	4% (Note: "Don't know" with 2%; "Other" & "Wouldn't vote" with 1%)
Emerson College	December 4–6, 2023	1,000 (RV)	± 3%	37%	43%	7%	1%	1%	12%
Issues & Insights/TIPP	November 29 – December 1, 2023	1,301 (RV)	± 2.8%	33%	38%	11%	2%	2%	14%
Emerson College	November 17–20, 2023	1,475 (RV)	± 2.5%	36%	42%	7%	1%	1%	13%
Beacon Research/Shaw & Company Research/Fox News	November 10–13, 2023	1,001 (RV)	± 3.0%	35%	41%	15%	3%	3%	3%
Quinnipiac University	November 9–13, 2023	1,574 (RV)	± 2.5%	35%	38%	17%	3%	3%	4%

==== Joe Biden vs. Donald Trump vs. Robert F. Kennedy Jr. ====
Poll source	Date	Sample size	Margin of error	Joe Biden Democratic	Donald Trump Republican	Robert F. Kennedy Jr. Independent	Others/ Undecided
	July 21, 2024	Biden withdraws from the race.					
Redfield & Wilton Strategies	July 15, 2024	2,621 (RV)	—N/a	42%	43%	6%	9%
Pew Research Center	July 1–7, 2024	7,729 (RV)	—N/a	40%	44%	15%	2%
Florida Atlantic University/Mainstreet Research	June 29–30, 2024	869 (LV)	—N/a	39%	42%	10%	9%
Harvard/Harris	June 28–30, 2024	2,090 (RV)	—N/a	39%	46%	15%	—N/a
Forbes/HarrisX	June 28–30, 2024	1,500 (RV)	± 2.5%	38%	43%	19%	—N/a
Patriot Polling	June 27–29, 2024	1,029 (RV)	—N/a	41%	44%	11%	4%
ActiVote	June 5–21, 2024	2,192 (LV)	± 2.1%	42%	44%	14%	—N/a
Reuters/Ipsos	June 12, 2024	930 (RV)	± 3.2%	37%	38%	10%	16%
ActiVote	May 23 – June 4, 2024	1,775 (LV)	± 2.3%	42%	45%	13%	—N/a
Reuters/Ipsos	May 30–31, 2024	2,135 (RV)	± 2.1%	39%	37%	10%	13%
ActiVote	May 6–21, 2024	1,153 (LV)	± 2.9%	42%	45%	13%	—N/a
Harvard-Harris	May 15–16, 2024	1,660 (RV)	± 2.0%	40%	45%	14%	—N/a
Reuters/Ipsos	May 7–14, 2024	3,208 (RV)	± 2.0%	40%	40%	13%	7%
Ipsos	May 7–13, 2024	1,730 (RV)	—N/a	37%	35%	5%	23%
Reuters/Ipsos	April 29–30, 2024	856 (RV)	± 3.2%	39%	38%	8%	15%
ActiVote	April 13–30, 2024	1,025 (LV)	± 3.1%	41.2%	44.4%	14.4%	—N/a
Florida Atlantic University/Mainstreet Research	April 26–28, 2024	851 (LV)	± 3.0%	43.7%	39.5%	11%	5.9%
HarrisX/Harris	April 24–25, 2024	1,961 (RV)	± 2.0%	41%	45%	14%	—N/a
Change Research (D)	April 17–22, 2024	2,745 (RV)	—N/a	38%	39%	8%	14%
ActiVote	March 24 – April 10, 2024	995 (LV)	± 3.1%	41%	44%	15%	—N/a
Reuters/Ipsos	March 7–13, 2024	3,356 (RV)	—N/a	43%	38%	12%	7%
Reuters/Ipsos	January 3–9, 2024	4,677 (RV)	± 1.5%	29%	30%	18%	23%
Quinnipiac University	December 14–18, 2023	1,647 (RV)	± 2.4%	38%	36%	22%	4%
Rasmussen Reports	December 6–7 & 10, 2023	892 (LV)	± 3.0%	32%	40%	16%	12% (Note: "Some other candidate" & "Not sure" with 6%)
Cygnal (R)	December 5–7, 2023	2,000 (LV)	± 2.16%	42%	43%	9%	6%
Harvard/Harris	November 15–16, 2023	2,851 (RV)	—N/a	36%	44%	21%	0%
Reuters/Ipsos	November 13–14, 2023	1,006 (RV)	± 3.8%	30%	32%	20%	18%
Quinnipiac University	November 9–13, 2023	1,574 (RV)	± 2.5%	37%	38%	21%	4%
Rasmussen Reports	November 8–12, 2023	987 (LV)	± 3.0%	38%	39%	12%	11%
Sienna College	October 22 – November 3, 2023	3,662 (RV)	± 1.8%	33%	35%	24%	8%
Cygnal (R)	October 30 – November 1, 2023	2,000 (LV)	± 2.2%	40%	39%	12%	8%
American Pulse Research & Polling	October 27–30, 2023	568 (LV)	± 4.1%	39%	39%	11%	11%
Quinnipiac University	October 26–30, 2023	1,610 (RV)	± 2.4%	39%	36%	22%	3%
Redfield & Wilton	October 29, 2023	1,500 (LV)	± 2.0%	38%	40%	10%	12%
Susquehanna	October 17–27, 2023	1,000 (LV)	± 3.2%	47%	40%	6%	7%
McLaughlin and Associates	October 23–26, 2023	449 (LV)	± 3.1%	37%	39%	14%	11%
USA Today/Suffolk University	October 17–20, 2023	1,000 (RV)	± 3.1%	38%	37%	14%	11%
Harvard Harris	October 18–19, 2023	2,103 (RV)	± 2%	36%	42%	22%	—N/a
Yahoo News/YouGov	October 10–16, 2023	1,123 (RV)	± 2.7%	40%	39%	9%	12%
NPR/PBS/Marist	October 11, 2023	1,218 (RV)	± 3.9%	44%	37%	16%	3%
	October 9, 2023	Kennedy announces he will run as an independent candidate					
Fox News	October 6–9, 2023	1,007 (RV)	± 3.0%	41%	41%	16%	2%
Cygnal (R)	October 3–5, 2023	2,000 (A)	± 2.16%	39%	40%	12%	9%
Reuters/Ipsos	October 3–4, 2023	1,005 (A)	± 4.0%	31%	33%	14%	22%
Echelon Insights	September 25–28, 2023	1,011 (LV)	± 4.0%	36%	40%	14%	10%
American Values	September 24, 2023	1,008	± 3.2%	38%	38%	19%	5%

==== Joe Biden vs. Donald Trump vs. Cornel West ====
Poll source	Date	Sample size	Margin of error	Joe Biden Democratic	Donald Trump Republican	Cornel West Independent	Others/ Undecided
	July 21, 2024	Biden withdraws from the race.					
The Wall Street Journal	August 24–30, 2023	1,500 (RV)	—N/a	39%	40%	2%	19%
Emerson College	August 25–26, 2023	1,000 (RV)	± 3.0%	39%	44%	4%	13%
McLaughlin & Associates	August 15–23, 2023	1,000 (LV)	—N/a	41%	42%	6%	11%
Big Data Poll	August 19–21, 2023	2,765 (LV)	—N/a	40%	43%	3%	14%
Emerson College	August 16–17, 2023	1,000 (RV)	± 3.0%	41%	42%	5%	12%
McLaughlin & Associates	July 19–24, 2023	1,000 (LV)	—N/a	40%	42%	5%	13%
Echelon Insights	June 26–29, 2023	1,020 (LV)	± 3.9%	42%	43%	4%	11%
Emerson College	June 19–20, 2023	1,015 (RV)	± 3.0%	40%	41%	6%	13%

==== Joe Biden vs. Donald Trump vs. Robert F. Kennedy Jr. vs. Cornel West ====
Poll source	Date	Sample size	Margin of error	Joe Biden Democratic	Donald Trump Republican	Robert F. Kennedy Jr. Independent	Cornel West Independent	Others/ Undecided
	July 21, 2024	Biden withdraws from the race.						
Big Village	June 7–9, 2024	1,423 (LV)	± 3.0%	43%	42%	7%	1%	7%
Big Village	May 3–8, 2024	3,032 (LV)	± 2.0%	41.9%	40.6%	8.8%	1.2%	7.5%
Big Village	March 29–31, 2024	1,425 (LV)	± 3.4%	42%	40%	8%	2%	8%
Atlas Intel	February 2–7, 2024	1,637 (RV)	± 2.0%	42%	44%	5%	0%	9%
Big Village	November 27 – December 3, 2023	2,219 (LV)	—N/a	36%	42%	12%	3%	7%
HarrisX	November 22–28, 2023	4,003 (RV)	—N/a	33%	41%	13%	2%	11%
HarrisX/The Messenger	November 15–19, 2023	3,017 (LV)	± 1.8%	33%	40%	14%	2%	11%
Issues & Insights/TIPP	November 1–11, 2023	1,242 (RV)	± 2.7%	39%	37%	9%	2%	12%
Big Village	October 30 – November 5, 2023	1,497 (LV)	± 2.2%	37.1%	40.1%	12.4%	1.7%	8.7%
CNN/SSRS	October 27 – November 2, 2023	1,271 (RV)	± 3.1%	35%	41%	16%	4%	3%
HarrisX/The Messenger	October 30 – November 1, 2023	2,021 (RV)	± 2.2%	36%	41%	11%	2%	10%
Quinnipiac University	October 26–30, 2023	1,610 (RV)	± 2.4%	36%	35%	19%	6%	4%
McLaughlin and Associates (R)	October 23–26, 2023	449 (LV)	± 3.1%	35%	38%	12%	2%	13%
Harris X/The Messenger	October 16–23, 2023	3,029 (RV)	± 1.8%	35%	38%	13%	2%	12%
USA Today/Suffolk University	October 17–20, 2023	1,000 (RV)	± 3.1%	37%	37%	13%	4%	9%
Harvard/Harris X	October 18–19, 2023	2,116 (RV)	± 2%	31%	39%	18%	3%	9%
Zogby Analytics	October 13–15, 2023	869 (LV)	± 3.3%	41.2%	42.6%	12.5%	3.7%	—N/a
	October 9, 2023	Kennedy announces he will run as an independent candidate						
	October 5, 2023	West announces he will run as an independent candidate						

=== Undeclared and generic candidates ===
The following nationwide polls feature at least one individual who is not a candidate for president, nor have they declined the possibility of a future campaign, as well as unnamed "generic" party candidates. Some candidates listed as "Independent" below do have a political party affiliation, but the poll was conducted on the hypothetical that they ran an independent campaign outside their party's nomination process.

Hypothetical polling with other candidates

==== Joe Biden vs. Liz Cheney ====
Poll source	Date	Sample size	Margin of error	Joe Biden Democratic	Liz Cheney Republican	Others/ Undecided
Emerson College	November 18–19, 2022	1,380 (RV)	± 2.5%	37%	19%	44%
Morning Consult	November 2–7, 2022	3,980 (RV)	± 3.0%	32%	25%	43%
Premise	September 2–5, 2022	1,185 (RV)	—N/a	42%	58%	—N/a

==== Joe Biden vs. Donald Trump with Liz Cheney as an independent ====
Poll source	Date	Sample size	Margin of error	Joe Biden Democratic	Donald Trump Republican	Liz Cheney Independent	Others/ Undecided
Ipsos/Reuters	February 6–13, 2023	915 (RV)	± 4.0%	32%	39%	15%	14%
Premise	September 2–5, 2022	1,185 (RV)	—N/a	37%	42%	21%	—N/a
Echelon Insights	August 19–22, 2022	1,054 (LV)	± 3.6%	38%	41%	12%	9%
YouGov/Yahoo News	August 18–22, 2022	1,185 (RV)	—N/a	32%	40%	11%	17%

==== Joe Biden vs. Donald Trump vs. Nikki Haley as an independent ====
Poll source	Date	Sample size	Margin of error	Joe Biden Democratic	Donald Trump Republican	Nikki Haley Independent	Undecided
SurveyUSA	January 31 – February 2, 2024	1,048 (LV)	± 3.7%	40%	45%	13%	3%
Emerson College	January 26–29, 2024	1,260 (RV)	± 2.7%	36.9%	41.7%	11.8%	9.6%

==== Joe Biden vs. Donald Trump vs. Nikki Haley as an independent vs. Robert F. Kennedy Jr. ====
Poll source	Date	Sample size	Margin of error	Joe Biden Democratic	Donald Trump Republican	Nikki Haley Independent	Robert F. Kennedy Jr. Independent	Undecided
SurveyUSA	January 31 – February 2, 2024	1,048 (LV)	± 3.7%	36%	43%	11%	9%	2%

==== Joe Biden vs. Donald Trump vs. Nikki Haley as an independent vs. Robert F. Kennedy Jr. vs Cornel West as an independent ====
Poll source	Date	Sample size	Margin of error	Joe Biden Democratic	Donald Trump Republican	Nikki Haley Independent	Robert F. Kennedy Jr. Independent	Cornel West Independent	Undecided
SurveyUSA	January 31 – February 2, 2024	1,048 (LV)	± 3.7%	36%	41%	10%	10%	1%	2%

==== Joe Biden vs. Donald Trump vs. Mark Cuban vs. Robert F. Kennedy Jr. vs. Jill Stein vs. Cornel West ====
Poll source	Date	Sample size	Margin of error	Joe Biden Democratic	Donald Trump Republican	Mark Cuban Independent	Robert F. Kennedy Jr. Independent	Jill Stein Green	Cornel West Independent	Others/ Undecided
Echelon Insights	December 12–16, 2023	1,012 (LV)	± 4.1%	36%	41%	4%	9%	1%	1%	8%

==== Joe Biden vs. Donald Trump vs. Andrew Yang ====
Poll source	Date	Sample size	Margin of error	Joe Biden Democratic	Donald Trump Republican	Andrew Yang Forward	Others/ Undecided
Echelon Insights	August 19–22, 2022	1,054 (LV)	± 3.6%	43%	39%	8%	10%
Echelon Insights	October 15–19, 2021	1,098 (RV)	—N/a	44%	40%	5%	11%

==== Joe Biden vs. Chris Christie ====
Poll source	Date	Sample size	Margin of error	Joe Biden Democratic	Chris Christie Republican	Others/ Undecided
Fox News	September 9–12, 2023	1,012 (RV)	± 3.0%	42%	41%	17%
CNN/SSRS	August 25–31, 2023	1,259 (RV)	± 3.5%	42%	44%	14%
The Guardian	July 11–19, 2023	1,104 (RV)	± 1.5%	43%	47%	10%
Morning Consult	November 2–7, 2022	3,980 (RV)	± 3.0%	39%	30%	31%

==== Joe Biden vs. Ron DeSantis ====
Poll source	Date	Sample size	Margin of error	Joe Biden Democratic	Ron DeSantis Republican	Others/ Undecided
Echelon Insights	December 12–16, 2023	1,012 (LV)	± 4.1%	46%	45%	9%
Beacon Research/Shaw & Company Research/Fox News	December 10–13, 2023	1,007 (RV)	± 3.0%	47%	47%	5% (Note: "Other" & "Don't know" with 2%; "Wouldn't vote" with 1%)
Clarity Campaign Labs	December 7–10, 2023	1,052 (RV)	± 1.81%	45%	39%	16% (Note: "Would not vote" with 9%; "Not sure" with 7%)
SSRS/CNN	November 29 – December 6, 2023	1,197 (RV)	± 3.4%	42%	49%	9% (Note: "Other" with 6%; "Do not plan to vote" with 2%; "No opinion" with 1%)
YouGov	November 20–27, 2023	1,000 (A)	± 4.1%	38%	35%	27%
Echelon Insights	November 14–17, 2023	1,006 (LV)	± 4.1%	45%	43%	12%
Beacon Research/Shaw & Company Research/Fox News	November 10–13, 2023	1,001 (RV)	± 3.0%	45%	50%	5%
SSRS/CNN	October 27 – November 2, 2023	1,271 (RV)	± 3.1%	46%	48%	6%
Morning Consult	October 20–22, 2023	5,000 (RV)	± 1%	43%	38%	19%
Fox News	October 6–9, 2023	1,007 (RV)	± 3.0%	47%	49%	3%
Echelon Insights	September 25–28, 2023	1,011 (LV)	± 4.0%	42%	41%	17%
NBC News	September 15–19, 2023	1,000 (RV)	± 3.1%	46%	45%	6%
Harvard/Harris (Note: Poll sponsored by Harvard University Center for American Political Studies)	September 13–14, 2023	2,103 (RV)	—N/a	42%	38%	20%
Fox News	September 9–12, 2023	1,012 (RV)	± 3.0%	47%	44%	6%
CNN/SSRS	August 25–31, 2023	1,259 (RV)	± 3.5%	47%	47%	6%
Big Data Poll	August 19–21, 2023	2,765 (LV)	—N/a	41%	35%	23%
Noble Predictive Insights/The Center Square	July 31 – August 3, 2023	2,500 (RV)	± 2.4%	43%	41%	16%
Big Village	July 24–26, 2023	1,663 (RV)	± 2.2%	43%	38%	19%
Marquette University	July 7–12, 2023	788 (RV)	± 4.2%	48%	51%	—N/a
Emerson College	June 19–20, 2023	1,015 (RV)	± 3.0%	43%	37%	21%
NBC News	June 16–20, 2023	1,000 (RV)	± 3.1%	47%	47%	6%
The Hill	June 14–15, 2023	2,090 (RV)	—N/a	40%	41%	19%
Morning Consult	June 9–11, 2023	6,000 (RV)	± 1%	43%	39%	18%
YouGov	May 25–30, 2023	1,011 (RV)	—N/a	46%	40%	14%
Harvard/Harris	May 17–18, 2023	2,004 (RV)	—N/a	42%	42%	16%
Marquette University	May 8–18, 2023	1,000 (A)	± 3.7%	37%	38%	25%
Redfield & Wilton Strategies	May 17, 2023	1,117 (LV)	—N/a	47%	33%	20%
YouGov/The Economist	May 13–16, 2023	1,302 (RV)	± 2.8%	41%	41%	18%
Premise	May 12–15, 2023	1,591 (RV)	—N/a	39%	36%	25%
Morning Consult	May 12–14, 2023	6,000 (RV)	± 1.0%	43%	41%	16%
YouGov/Yahoo News	May 5–8, 2023	1,057 (RV)	—N/a	45%	42%	15%
Morning Consult	May 5–7, 2023	6,000 (RV)	—N/a	44%	40%	16%
Emerson College	April 24–25, 2023	1,100 (RV)	—N/a	43%	37%	20%
Morning Consult	April 21–23, 2023	6,000 (RV)	—N/a	44%	40%	16%
Harvard/Harris	April 18–19, 2023	1,845 (RV)	—N/a	40%	43%	17%
Premise	April 14–17, 2023	1,485 (RV)	—N/a	40%	37%	23%
YouGov/Yahoo News	April 14–17, 2023	1,027 (RV)	—N/a	45%	41%	14%
Morning Consult	April 14–16, 2023	6,000 (RV)	± 1.0%	42%	41%	17%
Morning Consult	April 7–9, 2023	5,000 (RV)	± 1.0%	43%	41%	16%
Redfield & Wilton Strategies	April 4, 2023	1,180 (LV)	—N/a	45%	36%	19%
Premise	March 31 – April 3, 2023	1,562 (RV)	—N/a	38%	38%	24%
Rasmussen Reports	March 30 – April 3, 2023	971 (LV)	± 3.0%	38%	46%	16%
Morning Consult	March 31 – April 2, 2023	5,000 (RV)	± 1.0%	42%	40%	18%
Echelon Insights	March 27–29, 2023	1,007 (LV)	± 3.8%	45%	42%	13%
Cygnal (R)	March 26–27, 2023	2,550 (LV)	± 1.9%	45%	45%	10%
Quinnipiac University	March 23–27, 2023	1,600 (RV)	± 2.5%	46%	48%	6%
Morning Consult	March 24–26, 2023	5,000 (RV)	± 1.0%	42%	41%	17%
Harvard/Harris	March 22–23, 2023	2,905 (RV)	—N/a	41%	44%	15%
Marquette University	March 12–22, 2023	863 (RV)	± 4.0%	41%	42%	17%
Premise	March 16–21, 2023	1,509 (RV)	—N/a	38%	39%	23%
Redfield & Wilton Strategies	March 20, 2023	1,250 (LV)	—N/a	45%	38%	17%
YouGov/Yahoo News	March 16–20, 2023	1,060 (RV)	± 2.7%	43%	43%	14%
Morning Consult	March 17–19, 2023	5,000 (RV)	± 1.0%	43%	41%	16%
Quinnipiac University	March 9–13, 2023	1,635 (RV)	± 2.4%	47%	46%	7%
Morning Consult	March 10–12, 2023	5,000 (RV)	± 1.0%	43%	42%	15%
Wick Insights	March 6–9, 2023	1,125 (LV)	—N/a	41%	44%	15%
Premise	March 4–7, 2023	1,621 (RV)	—N/a	39%	39%	22%
Morning Consult	March 3–5, 2023	5,000 (RV)	± 1.0%	44%	40%	16%
Cygnal (R)	February 24–27, 2023	2,424 (LV)	± 2.0%	46%	45%	9%
YouGov/Yahoo News	February 23–27, 2023	1,014 (RV)	± 2.7%	42%	44%	14%
Emerson College	February 24–25, 2023	1,060 (RV)	± 2.9%	44%	40%	16%
Morning Consult	February 23–25, 2023	6,000 (RV)	—N/a	42%	41%	17%
Echelon Insights	February 21–23, 2023	1,023 (LV)	—N/a	44%	47%	9%
Redfield & Wilton Strategies	February 19, 2023	1,102 (LV)	—N/a	43%	34%	23%
Morning Consult	February 17–19, 2023	6,000 (RV)	± 1.0%	41%	42%	17%
Premise	February 16–19, 2023	1,717 (RV)	—N/a	42%	37%	21%
Harvard/Harris	February 15–16, 2023	1,838 (RV)	—N/a	41%	42%	17%
Quinnipac University	February 9–14, 2023	1,429 (RV)	± 2.6%	46%	47%	7%
Ipsos/Reuters	February 6–13, 2023	915 (RV)	± 4.0%	38%	41%	21%
Morning Consult	February 10–12, 2023	6,000 (RV)	—N/a	43%	41%	16%
Public Policy Polling (D)	February 10–11, 2023	1,056 (RV)	—N/a	47%	44%	9%
YouGov/Yahoo News	February 2–6, 2023	1,063 (RV)	± 2.8%	43%	44%	13%
Morning Consult	February 3–5, 2023	6,000 (RV)	± 1.0%	42%	42%	16%
Redfield & Wilton Strategies	January 28–29, 2023	1,139 (LV)	—N/a	40%	39%	21%
Morning Consult	January 27–29, 2023	6,000 (RV)	± 1.0%	42%	41%	17%
Echelon Insights	January 23–25, 2023	1,024 (LV)	± 3.9%	42%	45%	13%
Morning Consult	January 20–22, 2023	6,000 (RV)	± 1.0%	41%	43%	16%
Emerson College	January 19–21, 2023	1,015 (RV)	± 2.5%	40%	39%	21%
Cygnal (R)	January 19–20, 2023	2,529 (LV)	± 2.0%	46%	45%	9%
Marquette University	January 9–20, 2023	790 (RV)	± 4.0%	38%	45%	17%
Harvard/Harris	January 18–19, 2023	2,050 (RV)	—N/a	39%	42%	19%
YouGov/The Economist	January 14–17, 2023	1,314 (RV)	± 3.0%	43%	43%	14%
Redfield & Wilton Strategies	January 16, 2023	1,458 (RV)	—N/a	40%	38%	22%
YouGov/YahooNews	January 12–16, 2023	1,028 (RV)	± 2.7%	44%	42%	14%
Morning Consult	January 10–12, 2023	6,000 (RV)	± 1.0%	41%	44%	15%
Morning Consult	January 6–8, 2023	7,500 (RV)	± 1.0%	43%	43%	14%
WPA Intelligence	January 2–8, 2023	1,035 (LV)	± 3.0%	42%	45%	13%
Morning Consult	December 31, 2022 – January 2, 2023	8,000 (RV)	± 1.0%	42%	42%	16%
YouGov/Yahoo News	December 15–19, 2022	1,041 (RV)	± 2.7%	43%	43%	14%
Morning Consult	December 16–18, 2022	7,000 (RV)	± 1.0%	43%	42%	15%
Harvard/Harris	December 14–15, 2022	1,851 (RV)	—N/a	39%	43%	18%
Echelon Insights	December 12–14, 2022	1,021 (LV)	± 3.7%	44%	44%	12%
Morning Consult	December 9–11, 2022	7,000 (RV)	± 1.0%	42%	42%	16%
Suffolk University	December 7–11, 2022	1,000 (RV)	± 3.1%	43%	47%	10%
Redfield & Wilton Strategies	December 5, 2022	1,162 (LV)	—N/a	42%	40%	18%
YouGov/Yahoo News	December 1–5, 2022	1,204 (RV)	± 2.6%	44%	44%	12%
Marquette University	November 15–22, 2022	840 (RV)	± 4.0%	42%	42%	16%
Emerson College	November 18–19, 2022	1,380 (RV)	± 2.5%	43%	39%	18%
Echelon Insights	November 17–19, 2022	1,036 (LV)	± 3.8%	42%	45%	13%
Redfield & Wilton Strategies	November 17, 2022	1,203 (LV)	—N/a	43%	39%	18%
Harvard/Harris	November 16–17, 2022	2,212 (RV)	—N/a	43%	43%	14%
Léger	November 11–13, 2022	1,007 (A)	—N/a	33%	35%	32%
Democracy Corps/GQR	November 6–8, 2022	1,000 (RV)	—N/a	45%	49%	6%
Morning Consult	November 2–7, 2022	3,980 (RV)	± 3.0%	40%	40%	20%
Marquette University	September 6–14, 2022	1,282 (RV)	± 3.6%	43%	38%	19%
Echelon Insights	August 31 – September 7, 2022	1,228 (LV)	± 3.5%	46%	41%	13%
YouGov/Yahoo News	July 28 – August 1, 2022	1,152 (RV)	—N/a	45%	42%	13%
Echelon Insights	July 15–18, 2022	1,022 (LV)	—N/a	45%	41%	14%
YouGov/Yahoo News	June 24–27, 2022	1,239 (RV)	—N/a	45%	42%	13%
Rasmussen Reports	April 28 – May 2, 2022	1,004 (LV)	± 3.0%	35%	46%	19%
Marquette Law School	March 14–24, 2022	1,004 (A)	± 4.0%	38%	33%	29%
Morning Consult	January 22–23, 2022	2,005 (RV)	± 2.0%	44%	39%	17%
Marquette Law School (Note: Archived January 28, 2022, at the Wayback Machine)	January 10–21, 2022	1,000 (A)	—N/a	41%	33%	26%
Harvard/Harris	November 30 – December 2, 2021	1,989 (RV)	—N/a	43%	36%	21%
Emerson College	August 30 – September 1, 2021	1,200 (RV)	± 2.7%	48%	36%	16%
Echelon Insights	April 16–23, 2021	1,043 (RV)	—N/a	45%	28%	27%
Ipsos/Reuters	April 12–16, 2021	1,105 (A)	—N/a	41%	25%	34%

==== Joe Biden vs. Ron DeSantis vs. Cornel West ====
Poll source	Date	Sample size	Margin of error	Joe Biden Democratic	Ron DeSantis Republican	Cornel West Independent	Others/ Undecided
Big Data Poll	August 19–21, 2023	2,765 (LV)	—N/a	40%	34%	4%	23%

==== Joe Biden vs. Ron DeSantis with Donald Trump as an independent ====
Poll source	Date	Sample size	Margin of error	Joe Biden Democratic	Ron DeSantis Republican	Donald Trump Independent	Others/ Undecided
Ipsos/Reuters	May 9–15, 2023	4,415 (A)	—N/a	37%	19%	22%	22%
Ipsos/Reuters	April 21–24, 2023	1,005 (A)	—N/a	38%	19%	22%	21%
Echelon Insights	August 19–22, 2022	1,054 (LV)	± 3.6%	46%	23%	21%	10%

==== Joe Biden vs. Vivek Ramaswamy ====
Poll source	Date	Sample size	Margin of error	Joe Biden Democratic	Vivek Ramaswamy Republican	Others/ Undecided
Harvard/Harris (Note: Poll sponsored by Harvard University Center for American Political Studies)	September 13–14, 2023	2,103 (RV)	—N/a	39%	37%	24%
Fox News	September 9–12, 2023	1,012 (RV)	± 3.0%	44%	45%	7%
CNN/SSRS	August 25–31, 2023	1,259 (RV)	± 3.5%	46%	45%	11%

==== Joe Biden vs. Mitt Romney ====
Poll source	Date	Sample size	Margin of error	Joe Biden Democratic	Mitt Romney Republican	Others/ Undecided
Emerson College	October 16–17, 2023	1,578 (RV)	± 2.4%	40%	30%	29%
Morning Consult	November 2–7, 2022	3,980 (RV)	± 3.0%	36%	33%	31%
Echelon Insights	March 18–21, 2022	1,050 (RV)	—N/a	41%	35%	24%
Emerson College	August 30 – September 1, 2021	1,200 (RV)	± 2.7%	42%	23%	35%

==== Joe Biden vs. Tom Cotton ====
Poll source	Date	Sample size	Margin of error	Joe Biden Democratic	Tom Cotton Republican	Others/ Undecided
Morning Consult	November 2–7, 2022	3,980 (RV)	± 3.0%	37%	31%	32%

==== Joe Biden vs. Josh Hawley ====
Poll source	Date	Sample size	Margin of error	Joe Biden Democratic	Josh Hawley Republican	Others/ Undecided
Morning Consult	November 2–7, 2022	3,980 (RV)	± 3.0%	38%	31%	31%

==== Joe Biden vs. Larry Hogan ====
Poll source	Date	Sample size	Margin of error	Joe Biden Democratic	Larry Hogan Republican	Others/ Undecided
Morning Consult	November 2–7, 2022	3,980 (RV)	± 3.0%	35%	28%	37%

==== Joe Biden vs. Ted Cruz ====
Poll source	Date	Sample size	Margin of error	Joe Biden Democratic	Ted Cruz Republican	Others/ Undecided
Morning Consult	November 2–7, 2022	3,980 (RV)	± 3.0%	43%	37%	20%
Morning Consult	January 22–23, 2022	2,005 (RV)	± 2.0%	45%	39%	16%
Ipsos/Reuters	April 12–16, 2021	1,105 (A)	—N/a	46%	24%	30%

==== Joe Biden vs. Kristi Noem ====
Poll source	Date	Sample size	Margin of error	Joe Biden Democratic	Kristi Noem Republican	Others/ Undecided
Morning Consult	November 2–7, 2022	3,980 (RV)	± 3.0%	37%	31%	32%

==== Joe Biden vs. Mike Pence ====
Poll source	Date	Sample size	Margin of error	Joe Biden Democratic	Mike Pence Republican	Others/ Undecided
Harvard/Harris (Note: Poll sponsored by Harvard University Center for American Political Studies)	September 13–14, 2023	2,103 (RV)	—N/a	42%	36%	23%
Fox News	September 9–12, 2023	1,012 (RV)	± 3.0%	43%	44%	9%
CNN/SSRS	August 25–31, 2023	1,259 (RV)	± 3.5%	44%	46%	10%
Wick Insights	March 6–9, 2023	1,125 (LV)	—N/a	41%	41%	18%
Cygnal (R)	February 24–27, 2023	2,424 (LV)	± 2.0%	45%	41%	14%
Public Policy Polling (D)	February 10–11, 2023	1,056 (RV)	—N/a	46%	38%	16%
Cygnal (R)	January 19–20, 2023	2,529 (LV)	± 2.0%	45%	41%	14%
Morning Consult	November 2–7, 2022	3,980 (RV)	± 3.0%	40%	39%	21%
Marquette Law School	March 14–24, 2022	1,004 (A)	± 4.0%	37%	33%	29%
Morning Consult	January 22–23, 2022	2,005 (RV)	± 2.0%	44%	42%	14%

==== Joe Biden vs. Mike Pompeo ====
Poll source	Date	Sample size	Margin of error	Joe Biden Democratic	Mike Pompeo Republican	Others/ Undecided
Morning Consult	November 2–7, 2022	3,980 (RV)	± 3.0%	39%	32%	29%

==== Joe Biden vs. Marco Rubio ====
Poll source	Date	Sample size	Margin of error	Joe Biden Democratic	Marco Rubio Republican	Others/ Undecided
Morning Consult	November 2–7, 2022	3,980 (RV)	± 3.0%	39%	37%	24%

==== Joe Biden vs. Nikki Haley ====
Poll source	Date	Sample size	Margin of error	Joe Biden Democratic	Nikki Haley Republican	Others/ Undecided
Quinnipiac University	February 15–19, 2024	1,421 (RV)	± 2.6%	46%	43%	12%
Emerson College	January 26–29, 2024	1,260 (RV)	± 2.7%	37%	38%	25%
Echelon Insights	December 12–16, 2023	1,012 (LV)	± 4.1%	41%	45%	13%
Beacon Research/Shaw & Company Research/Fox News	December 10–13, 2023	1,007 (RV)	± 3.0%	43%	49%	9% (Note: "Other", "Wouldn't vote" & "Don't know" with 3%)
Emerson College	December 4–6, 2023	1,000 (RV)	± 3%	38.9%	38.6%	22.5%
SSRS/CNN	November 29 – December 6, 2023	1,197 (RV)	± 3.4%	38%	50%	12% (Note: "Other" with 8%; "Do not plan to vote" with 3%; "No opinion" with 1%)
Wall Street Journal	November 29 – December 4, 2023	750 (RV)	—N/a	34%	51%	15%
Echelon Insights	November 14–17, 2023	1,006 (LV)	± 4.1%	41%	44%	15%
Emerson College	November 17–20, 2023	1,475 (RV)	± 2.5%	37.5%	37.6%	24.9%
Beacon Research/Shaw & Company Research/Fox News	November 10–13, 2023	1,001 (RV)	± 3.0%	41%	52%	7%
YouGov/Yahoo! News	November 9–13, 2023	1,061 (RV)	± 2.8%	39%	37%	24%
SSRS/CNN	October 27 – November 2, 2023	1,271 (RV)	± 3.1%	43%	49%	8%
Fox News	October 6–9, 2023	1,007 (RV)	± 3.0%	45%	49%	4%
NBC News	September 15–19, 2023	1,000 (RV)	± 3.1%	41%	46%	14%
Harvard/Harris (Note: Poll sponsored by Harvard University Center for American Political Studies)	September 13–14, 2023	2,103 (RV)	—N/a	37%	41%	21%
Fox News	September 9–12, 2023	1,012 (RV)	± 3.0%	43%	45%	8%
CNN/SSRS	August 25–31, 2023	1,259 (RV)	± 3.5%	43%	49%	8%
Harvard/Harris	May 17–18, 2023	2,004 (RV)	—N/a	40%	38%	22%
Premise	March 31 – April 3, 2023	1,562 (RV)	—N/a	36%	32%	32%
Harvard/Harris	March 22–23, 2023	2,905 (RV)	—N/a	42%	40%	18%
Premise	March 16–21, 2023	1,509 (RV)	—N/a	36%	34%	30%
Wick Insights	March 6–9, 2023	1,125 (LV)	—N/a	39%	37%	24%
Premise	March 4–7, 2023	1,621 (RV)	—N/a	37%	34%	29%
Cygnal (R)	February 24–27, 2023	2,424 (LV)	± 2.0%	46%	41%	13%
Emerson College	February 24–25, 2023	1,060 (RV)	± 2.9%	40%	37%	23%
Echelon Insights	February 21–23, 2023	1,023 (LV)	—N/a	43%	36%	21%
Rasmussen Reports	February 16–20, 2023	900 (LV)	± 3.0%	41%	45%	10%
Premise	February 16–19, 2023	1,717 (RV)	—N/a	39%	30%	31%
Morning Consult	February 16–19, 2023	2,000 (RV)	± 1.5%	41%	35%	24%
Ipsos/Reuters	February 6–13, 2023	915 (RV)	± 4.0%	43%	31%	26%
Public Policy Polling (D)	February 10–11, 2023	1,056 (RV)	—N/a	45%	39%	16%
Morning Consult	November 2–7, 2022	3,980 (RV)	± 3.0%	39%	33%	28%
Ipsos/Reuters	April 12–16, 2021	1,107 (A)	—N/a	44%	19%	37%

==== Joe Biden vs. Nikki Haley vs. Robert F. Kennedy Jr. vs. Cornel West ====
Poll source	Date	Sample size	Margin of error	Joe Biden Democratic	Nikki Haley Republican	Robert F. Kennedy Jr. Independent	Cornel West Independent	Others/ Undecided
AtlasIntel	February 2–7, 2024	1,637 (RV)	± 2.0%	41%	23%	11%	1%	24%

==== Joe Biden vs. Nikki Haley vs. Robert F. Kennedy Jr. vs. Cornel West vs. Jill Stein ====
Poll source	Date	Sample size	Margin of error	Joe Biden Democratic	Nikki Haley Republican	Robert F. Kennedy Jr. Independent	Cornel West Independent	Jill Stein Green	Others/ Undecided
Quinnipiac University	February 15–19, 2024	1,421 (RV)	± 2.6%	35%	27%	24%	5%	3%	6%

==== Joe Biden vs. Rick Scott ====
Poll source	Date	Sample size	Margin of error	Joe Biden Democratic	Rick Scott Republican	Others/ Undecided
Morning Consult	November 2–7, 2022	3,980 (RV)	± 3.0%	38%	33%	29%

==== Joe Biden vs. Tim Scott ====
Poll source	Date	Sample size	Margin of error	Joe Biden Democratic	Tim Scott Republican	Others/ Undecided
Harvard/Harris (Note: Poll sponsored by Harvard University Center for American Political Studies)	September 13–14, 2023	2,103 (RV)	—N/a	37%	39%	25%
Fox News	September 9–12, 2023	1,012 (RV)	± 3.0%	44%	43%	10%
CNN/SSRS	August 25–31, 2023	1,259 (RV)	± 3.5%	44%	46%	10%
Wick Insights	March 6–9, 2023	1,125 (LV)	—N/a	40%	34%	26%
Morning Consult	November 2–7, 2022	3,980 (RV)	± 3.0%	37%	32%	31%

==== Joe Biden vs. generic Republican ====
Poll source	Date	Sample size	Margin of error	Joe Biden Democratic	Generic Republican	Others/ Undecided
NBC News	November 10–14, 2023	1,000 (RV)	± 3.1%	37%	48%	15%
Cygnal (R)	October 30 – November 1, 2023	2,000 (LV)	± 2.2%	44%	40%	16%
NBC News	April 14–18, 2023	800 (RV)	± 3.5%	41%	47%	12%
Morning Consult	April 22–25, 2022	2,004 (RV)	± 2.0%	39%	46%	15%
Morning Consult	January 22–23, 2022	2,005 (RV)	± 2.0%	37%	46%	17%

==== Donald Trump vs. generic Democrat ====
Poll source	Date	Sample size	Margin of error	Donald Trump Republican	Generic Democrat	Others/ Undecided
Cygnal (R)	June 4–6, 2024	1,500 (LV)	± 2.53%	45%	40%	15%
NBC News	November 10–14, 2023	1,000 (RV)	± 3.1%	40%	46%	14%

==== Joe Biden vs. Donald Trump vs. generic Libertarian vs. generic Green vs. generic No Labels ====
Poll source	Date	Sample size	Margin of error	Joe Biden Democratic	Donald Trump Republican	Generic Libertarian	Generic Green	Generic No Labels	Others/ Undecided
NBC News	September 15–19, 2023	1,000 (RV)	± 3.1%	36%	39%	5%	4%	5%	11%

==== Kamala Harris vs. Ron DeSantis ====
Poll source	Date	Sample size	Margin of error	Kamala Harris Democratic	Ron DeSantis Republican	Others/ Undecided
Harvard/Harris (Note: Poll sponsored by Harvard University Center for American Political Studies)	September 13–14, 2023	2,103 (RV)	—N/a	44%	37%	19%
Harvard/Harris	May 17–18, 2023	2,004 (RV)	—N/a	42%	42%	16%
Harvard/Harris	April 18–19, 2023	1,845 (RV)	—N/a	41%	43%	16%
Harvard/Harris	March 22–23, 2023	2,905 (RV)	—N/a	38%	42%	20%
YouGov/Yahoo News	February 23–27, 2023	1,014 (RV)	± 2.7%	40%	45%	15%
Harvard/Harris	February 15–16, 2023	1,838 (RV)	—N/a	40%	42%	18%
Harvard/Harris	January 18–19, 2023	2,050 (RV)	—N/a	40%	43%	17%
Harvard/Harris	December 14–15, 2022	1,851 (RV)	—N/a	40%	45%	15%
Harvard/Harris	November 16–17, 2022	2,212 (RV)	—N/a	39%	42%	19%
Harvard/Harris	September 7–8, 2022	1,854 (RV)	—N/a	41%	38%	21%
Harvard/Harris	July 27–28, 2022	1,885 (RV)	—N/a	41%	40%	19%
Echelon Insights	July 15–18, 2022	1,022 (LV)	—N/a	43%	42%	15%
Harvard/Harris	June 28–29, 2022	1,308 (RV)	—N/a	39%	37%	23%
YouGov/Yahoo News	June 24–27, 2022	1,239 (RV)	—N/a	45%	43%	12%
Harvard/Harris	May 18–19, 2022	1,963 (RV)	—N/a	41%	38%	20%
Harvard/Harris	April 20–21, 2022	1,966 (RV)	—N/a	42%	38%	20%
Harvard/Harris	March 23–24, 2022	1,990 (RV)	—N/a	40%	38%	22%
Harvard/Harris	February 23–24, 2022	2,026 (RV)	—N/a	41%	39%	20%
Harvard/Harris	January 19–20, 2022	1,815 (RV)	—N/a	39%	40%	21%
Harvard/Harris	November 30 – December 2, 2021	1,989 (RV)	—N/a	42%	37%	21%
Harvard/Harris	October 26–28, 2021	1,578 (RV)	—N/a	40%	42%	18%
Echelon Insights	April 16–23, 2021	1,043 (RV)	—N/a	43%	31%	26%

==== Kamala Harris vs. JD Vance ====
Poll source	Date	Sample size	Margin of error	Kamala Harris Democratic	JD Vance Republican	Others/ Undecided
Clarity Campaign Labs	October 17–23, 2024	1,314 (LV)	± 1.5%	55%	42%	3%

==== Kamala Harris vs. Mike Pence ====
Poll source	Date	Sample size	Margin of error	Kamala Harris Democratic	Mike Pence Republican	Others/ Undecided
Harvard/Harris (Note: Poll sponsored by Harvard University Center for American Political Studies)	September 13–14, 2023	2,103 (RV)	—N/a	39%	39%	22%
Echelon Insights	June 18–22, 2021	1,001 (RV)	—N/a	45%	36%	19%

==== Kamala Harris vs. Mike Pompeo ====
Poll source	Date	Sample size	Margin of error	Kamala Harris Democratic	Mike Pompeo Republican	Others/ Undecided
Harvard/Harris	October 26–28, 2021	1,578 (RV)	—N/a	41%	41%	18%

==== Kamala Harris vs. Tim Scott ====
Poll source	Date	Sample size	Margin of error	Kamala Harris Democratic	Tim Scott Republican	Others/ Undecided
Harvard/Harris (Note: Poll sponsored by Harvard University Center for American Political Studies)	September 13–14, 2023	2,103 (RV)	—N/a	43%	35%	22%
Harvard/Harris	October 26–28, 2021	1,578 (RV)	—N/a	39%	42%	19%

==== Kamala Harris vs. Nikki Haley ====
Poll source	Date	Sample size	Margin of error	Kamala Harris Democratic	Nikki Haley Republican	Others/ Undecided
Harvard/Harris (Note: Poll sponsored by Harvard University Center for American Political Studies)	September 13–14, 2023	2,103 (RV)	—N/a	40%	39%	20%
Harvard/Harris	May 17–18, 2023	2,004 (RV)	—N/a	41%	38%	21%
Harvard/Harris	March 22–23, 2023	2,905 (RV)	—N/a	38%	43%	19%

==== Al Gore vs. Donald Trump ====
Poll source	Date	Sample size	Margin of error	Al Gore Democratic	Donald Trump Republican	Others/ Undecided
Emerson College	July 7–8, 2024	1,370 (RV)	± 2.6%	42%	47%	11%

==== Michelle Obama vs. Donald Trump ====
Poll source	Date	Sample size	Margin of error	Michelle Obama Democratic	Donald Trump Republican	Others/ Undecided
Reuters/Ipsos	July 1–2, 2024	1,070 (A)	± 3.5%	50%	39%	11%

==== Michelle Obama vs. Donald Trump vs. Robert F. Kennedy Jr. vs. Cornel West ====
Poll source	Date	Sample size	Margin of error	Michelle Obama Democratic	Donald Trump Republican	Robert F. Kennedy Jr. Independent	Cornel West Independent	Others/ Undecided
AtlasIntel	February 2–7, 2024	1,637 (RV)	± 2.0%	42%	39%	5%	0%	15%

==== Pete Buttigieg vs. Donald Trump ====
Poll source	Date	Sample size	Margin of error	Pete Buttigieg Democratic	Donald Trump Republican	Others/ Undecided
Emerson College	July 7–8, 2024	1,370 (RV)	± 2.6%	39%	49%	12%
CNN/SSRS	June 28–30, 2024	1,045 (RV)	± 3.5%	43%	47%	11%
Data for Progress (D)	June 28, 2024	1,011 (LV)	± 3.0%	44%	47%	9%
Public Policy Polling (D)	February 10–11, 2023	1,056 (RV)	—N/a	46%	44%	10%
McLaughlin & Associates	April 22–26, 2022	1,000 (LV)	—N/a	39%	49%	12%
Harvard/Harris	November 30 – December 2, 2021	1,989 (RV)	—N/a	37%	48%	15%

==== Hillary Clinton vs. Donald Trump ====
Poll source	Date	Sample size	Margin of error	Hillary Clinton Democratic	Donald Trump Republican	Others/ Undecided
Emerson College	July 7–8, 2024	1,370 (RV)	± 2.6%	41%	48%	11%
Bendixen & Amandi International (D)	July 2–6, 2024	1,000 (LV)	± 3.1%	43%	41%	16% (Note: "Third party" with 6%)
McLaughlin & Associates	March 17–22, 2022	1,000 (LV)	—N/a	41%	51%	8%
Schoen Cooperman Research	March 2–6, 2022	800 (LV)	—N/a	43%	46%	11%
McLaughlin & Associates	February 16–22, 2022	1,000 (LV)	—N/a	43%	50%	7%
Echelon Insights	January 21–23, 2022	1,029 (RV)	—N/a	43%	44%	13%
McLaughlin & Associates	January 13–18, 2022	1,000 (LV)	—N/a	41%	51%	8%

==== Cory Booker vs. Donald Trump ====
Poll source	Date	Sample size	Margin of error	Cory Booker Democratic	Donald Trump Republican	Others/ Undecided
Data for Progress (D)	June 28, 2024	1,011 (LV)	± 3.0%	44%	46%	10%

==== Amy Klobuchar vs. Donald Trump ====
Poll source	Date	Sample size	Margin of error	Amy Klobuchar Democratic	Donald Trump Republican	Others/ Undecided
Data for Progress (D)	June 28, 2024	1,011 (LV)	± 3.0%	43%	46%	10%

==== Joe Manchin vs. Donald Trump ====
Poll source	Date	Sample size	Margin of error	Joe Manchin Democratic	Donald Trump Republican	Others/ Undecided
Beacon Research/Shaw & Company Research/Fox News	November 10–13, 2023	1,001 (RV)	± 3.0%	46%	47%	7%

==== Bernie Sanders vs. Donald Trump ====
Poll source	Date	Sample size	Margin of error	Bernie Sanders Democratic	Donald Trump Republican	Others/ Undecided
Emerson College	July 7–8, 2024	1,370 (RV)	± 2.6%	42%	48%	10%
Emerson College	October 16–17, 2023	1,578 (RV)	± 2.4%	40%	48%	12%
Emerson College	July 19–20, 2022	1,078 (RV)	± 2.9%	40%	45%	15%
Morning Consult	April 22–25, 2022	2,004 (RV)	± 2.0%	42%	43%	15%

==== Elizabeth Warren vs. Donald Trump ====
Poll source	Date	Sample size	Margin of error	Elizabeth Warren Democratic	Donald Trump Republican	Others/ Undecided
Emerson College	July 7–8, 2024	1,370 (RV)	± 2.6%	38.9%	48.6%	12.5%
Public Policy Polling (D)	February 10–11, 2023	1,056 (RV)	—N/a	48%	46%	6%

==== Andy Beshear vs. Donald Trump ====
Poll source	Date	Sample size	Margin of error	Andy Beshear Democratic	Donald Trump Republican	Others/ Undecided
Reuters/Ipsos	July 1–2, 2024	1,070 (A)	± 3.5%	36%	40%	24%

==== Phil Murphy vs. Donald Trump ====
Poll source	Date	Sample size	Margin of error	Phil Murphy Democratic	Donald Trump Republican	Others/ Undecided
McLaughlin & Associates	April 22–26, 2022	1,000 (LV)	—N/a	33%	49%	18%

==== Gavin Newsom vs. Donald Trump ====
Poll source	Date	Sample size	Margin of error	Gavin Newsom Democratic	Donald Trump Republican	Others/ Undecided
NPR/PBS News/Marist College	July 9–10, 2024	1,174 (RV)	± 3.3%	50%	48%	2%
Fox News	July 7–10, 2024	1,210 (RV)	± 3.0%	48%	48%	4%
Emerson College	July 7–8, 2024	1,370 (RV)	± 2.6%	40%	48%	12%
Bendixen & Amandi International (D)	July 2–6, 2024	1,000 (LV)	± 3.1%	37%	40%	23% (Note: "Third party" with 8%)
Reuters/Ipsos	July 1–2, 2024	1,070 (A)	± 3.5%	39%	42%	19%
CNN/SSRS	June 28–30, 2024	1,045 (RV)	± 3.5%	43%	48%	8%
Data for Progress (D)	June 28, 2024	1,011 (LV)	± 3.0%	44%	47%	9%
Cygnal (R)	December 5–7, 2023	2,000 (LV)	± 2.16%	40.9%	46.6%	12.5%
Beacon Research/Shaw & Company Research/Fox News	November 10–13, 2023	1,001 (RV)	± 3.0%	45%	49%	6%
YouGov/Yahoo News	June 24–27, 2022	1,239 (RV)	—N/a	45%	43%	12%

==== Gavin Newsom vs. Ron DeSantis ====
Poll source	Date	Sample size	Margin of error	Gavin Newsom Democratic	Ron DeSantis Republican	Others/ Undecided
YouGov/Rose Institute	October 11–26, 2022	5,050 (RV)	± 3.0%	49%	51%	—N/a
YouGov/Yahoo News	June 24–27, 2022	1,239 (RV)	—N/a	43%	42%	15%

==== JB Pritzker vs. Donald Trump ====
Poll source	Date	Sample size	Margin of error	JB Pritzker Democratic	Donald Trump Republican	Others/ Undecided
Reuters/Ipsos	July 1–2, 2024	1,070 (A)	± 3.5%	34%	40%	26%
Data for Progress (D)	June 28, 2024	1,011 (LV)	± 3.0%	43%	46%	11%

==== Josh Shapiro vs. Donald Trump ====
Poll source	Date	Sample size	Margin of error	Josh Shapiro Democratic	Donald Trump Republican	Others/ Undecided
Emerson College	July 7–8, 2024	1,370 (RV)	± 2.6%	38%	46%	16%
Data for Progress (D)	June 28, 2024	1,011 (LV)	± 3.0%	43%	46%	12%

==== Gretchen Whitmer vs. Donald Trump ====
Poll source	Date	Sample size	Margin of error	Gretchen Whitmer Democratic	Donald Trump Republican	Others/ Undecided
NPR/PBS News/Marist College	July 9–10, 2024	1,174 (RV)	± 3.3%	49%	49%	2%
Fox News	July 7–10, 2024	1,210 (RV)	± 3.0%	48%	49%	3%
Emerson College	July 7–8, 2024	1,370 (RV)	± 2.6%	38%	48%	14%
Bendixen & Amandi International (D)	July 2–6, 2024	1,000 (LV)	± 3.1%	36%	40%	24% (Note: "Third party" with 7%)
Reuters/Ipsos	July 1–2, 2024	1,070 (A)	± 3.5%	36%	41%	23%
CNN/SSRS	June 28–30, 2024	1,045 (RV)	± 3.5%	42%	47%	11%
Data for Progress (D)	June 28, 2024	1,011 (LV)	± 3.0%	44%	46%	10%
Beacon Research/Shaw & Company Research/Fox News	November 10–13, 2023	1,001 (RV)	± 3.0%	46%	48%	6%

==== Joe Biden vs. Donald Trump with Joe Manchin as an independent ====
Poll source	Date	Sample size	Margin of error	Joe Biden Democratic	Donald Trump Republican	Joe Manchin Independent	Others/ Undecided
Echelon Insights	May 22–25, 2023	1,035 (LV)	± 3.6%	41%	42%	9%	8%

==== Joe Biden vs. Ron DeSantis with Joe Manchin as an independent ====
Poll source	Date	Sample size	Margin of error	Joe Biden Democratic	Ron DeSantis Republican	Joe Manchin Independent	Others/ Undecided
Echelon Insights	May 22–25, 2023	1,035 (LV)	± 3.6%	42%	38%	8%	12%

==== Joe Biden vs. Donald Trump vs. Robert F. Kennedy Jr. with Joe Manchin as an independent ====
Poll source	Date	Sample size	Margin of error	Joe Biden Democratic	Donald Trump Republican	Robert F. Kennedy Jr. Independent	Joe Manchin Independent	Others/ Undecided
Cygnal (R)	December 5–7, 2023	2,000 (LV)	± 2.16%	41.3%	41%	8%	3.3%	6.4%

==== Joe Biden vs. Donald Trump vs. Cornel West with Joe Manchin as No Labels Party ====
Poll source	Date	Sample size	Margin of error	Joe Biden Democratic	Donald Trump Republican	Cornel West Independent	Joe Manchin No Labels	Others/ Undecided
McLaughlin & Associates	August 15–23, 2023	1,000 (LV)	—N/a	38%	39%	5%	7%	11%
McLaughlin & Associates	July 19–24, 2023	1,000 (LV)	—N/a	38%	40%	6%	5%	11%

==== Joe Biden vs. Donald Trump vs. Robert F. Kennedy Jr. vs. Joe Manchin as an independent vs. Jill Stein ====
Poll source	Date	Sample size	Margin of error	Joe Biden Democratic	Donald Trump Republican	Robert F. Kennedy Jr. Independent	Joe Manchin Independent	Jill Stein Green	Others/ Undecided
Beacon Research/Shaw & Company Research/Fox News	November 10–13, 2023	1,001 (RV)	± 3.0%	35%	40%	13%	5%	4%	2%

==== Joe Biden vs. Donald Trump vs. Robert F. Kennedy Jr. vs. Cornel West vs. Joe Manchin as No Labels vs. Jill Stein ====
Poll source	Date	Sample size	Margin of error	Joe Biden Democratic	Donald Trump Republican	Robert F. Kennedy Jr. Independent	Cornel West Independent	Joe Manchin No Labels	Jill Stein Green	Others/ Undecided
McLaughlin & Associates	December 13–19, 2023	1,000 (LV)	—N/a	34%	36%	10%	2%	3%	2%	13%

==== Joe Biden vs. Donald Trump vs. Robert F. Kennedy Jr. vs. Cornel West vs. Joe Manchin as No Labels vs. Jill Stein vs. Lars Mapstead ====
Poll source	Date	Sample size	Margin of error	Joe Biden Democratic	Donald Trump Republican	Robert F. Kennedy Jr. Independent	Cornel West Independent	Joe Manchin No Labels	Jill Stein Green	Lars Mapstead Libertarian	Others/ Undecided
I&I/TIPP	January 31 – February 2, 2024	1,266 (RV)	± 2.8%	34%	40%	8%	2%	3%	1%	1%	12%

==== Jerome Segal vs. Donald Trump ====
Poll source	Date	Sample size	Margin of error	Jerome Segal Democratic	Donald Trump Republican	Others/ Undecided
John Zogby Strategies	October 5, 2022	1,006 (LV)	± 3.2%	40%	39%	21%

==== Generic Democrat vs. Generic Republican ====
Poll source	Date	Sample size	Margin of error	Generic Democrat Democratic	Generic Republican Republican	Others/ Undecided
The Economist/YouGov	November 25–27, 2023	1,323 (RV)	± 3.1%	43%	41%	16%

== Limitations ==
While national polls give important signals on the views of the electorate, the winner of the election is determined by the United States Electoral College, so the level of support for each candidate in each state is important. This is gauged by state-by-state polling.

Poll results can be affected by methodology, especially in how they predict who will vote in the next election, and re-weighting answers to compensate for slightly non-random samples. One technique, "weighting on recalled vote" is an attempt to compensate for previous underestimates of votes for Donald Trump by rebalancing the sample based on last vote. This can introduce new errors if voters misstate their previous votes. When used for the 2024 presidential election it had produced results closer to the 2020 presidential election than the 2022 mid-term election.

== See also ==
- 2024 United States elections
- Statewide opinion polling for the 2024 United States presidential election
  - 2024 United States gubernatorial elections
  - 2024 United States House of Representatives elections
  - 2024 United States Senate elections
