= Nationwide opinion polling for the 2008 United States presidential election =

Scientific, nationwide public opinion polls conducted relating to the 2008 United States presidential election include:

== Presidential election ==
=== Two-way contest: Barack Obama vs John McCain ===
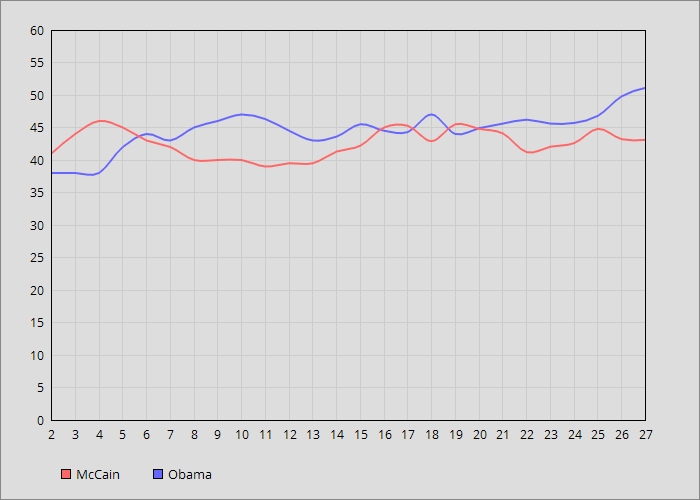
Graphical summary by monthly average

Poll Source	Date administered	Barack Obama	John McCain	Lead margin	Sample size	Margin of error
Marist College	November 3, 2008	52%	43%	9	804 LV	±3.5%
American Research Group	November 1–3, 2008	53%	45%	8	1,200 LV	±3%
Marist College	November 2, 2008	53%	44%	9	635 LV	±4%
NBC News/Wall Street Journal	November 1 –2, 2008	51%	43%	8	1,011 LV	±3.1%
Fox News/Opinion Dynamics Corporation	November 1–2, 2008	50%	43%	7	971 LV	±3%
CBS News	October 31–November 2, 2008	51%	42%	9	714 LV	Not reported
Reuters/C-SPAN/Zogby International (Daily Tracking)	October 31–November 2, 2008	50.9%	43.8%	7.1	Not reported	Not reported
Investor's Daily Business/TIPP (Daily Tracking)	October 31–November 2, 2008	47.5%	43%	4.5	Not reported	Not reported
Gallup (Daily Tracking Model II)	October 31 – November 2, 2008	53%	42%	11	2,458 LV	±2%
CNN/Opinion Research Corporation	October 30 – November 1, 2008	53%	46%	7	714 LV	±3.5%
Rasmussen Reports/Pulse Opinion Research (Daily Tracking)	October 30–November 1, 2008	51%	46%	5	3,000 LV	±2%
Pew Research Center	October 29 – November 1, 2008	49%	42%	7	2,587 LV	±2.5%
Polimetrix/YouGov	October 18–November 1, 2008	51%	45%	6	31,148 RV	Not reported
Diageo/The Hotline/Financial Dynamics (Daily Tracking)	October 29–31, 2008	51%	44%	7	876 LV	±3.3%
ABC News/Washington Post (Daily Tracking)	October 28–31, 2008	53%	44%	9	1,896 LV	Not reported
Gallup (Daily Tracking Model II)	October 28–30, 2008	52%	43%	9	2,459 LV	±2%
Reuters/C-SPAN/Zogby International (Daily Tracking)	October 28–30, 2008	50.1%	43.1%	7	1,201 LV	±2.9%
Investor's Business Daily/TIPP (Daily Tracking)	October 28–30, 2008	47.9%	43.4%	4.5	Not reported	Not reported
Marist College	October 29, 2008	50%	43%	7	543 LV	±4.5%
Fox News/Opinion Dynamics Corporation	October 28–29, 2008	47%	44%	3	924 LV	±3%
Rasmussen Reports/Pulse Opinion Research (Daily Tracking)	October 27–29, 2008	51%	46%	5	3,000 LV	±2%
CBS News/New York Times	October 25–29, 2008	52%	41%	11	1,005 LV	Not reported
Diageo/The Hotline/Financial Dynamics (Daily Tracking)	October 26–28, 2008	49%	42%	7	870 LV	±3.3%
The Economist/YouGov	October 25–27, 2008	49%	42%	7	981 RV	Not reported
Gallup (Daily Tracking Model II)	October 25–27, 2008	51%	44%	7	2,396 LV	±2%
Reuters/C-SPAN/Zogby International (Daily Tracking)	October 25–27, 2008	49%	44.7%	4.3	1,202 LV	±2.9%
ABC News/Washington Post (Daily Tracking)	October 24–27, 2008	52%	45%	7	1,301 LV	Not reported
McClatchy/Ipsos	October 23–27, 2008	50%	45%	5	831 LV	±3.4%
Investor's Business Daily/TIPP (Daily Tracking)	October 23–27, 2008	46.7%	43.7%	3	Not reported	Not reported
George Washington University/Tarrance Group/Lake Research Partners (Daily Tracking)	October 21–23, 26–27, 2008	49%	45%	4	1,000 LV	±3.1%
Rasmussen Reports/Pulse Opinion Research (Daily Tracking)	October 24–26, 2008	51%	46%	5	3,000 LV	±2%
Diageo/The Hotline/Financial Dynamics (Daily Tracking)	October 23–25, 2008	50%	42%	8	878 LV	±3.3%
Gallup (Daily Tracking Model II)	October 22–24, 2008	51%	43%	8	2,358 LV	±2%
Reuters/C-SPAN/Zogby International (Daily Tracking)	October 21–24, 2008	51.1%	41.6%	9.5	1,203 LV	±2.9%
Newsweek/Princeton Survey Research Associates International	October 22–23, 2008	53%	41%	12	882 LV	±4%
Rasmussen Reports/Pulse Opinion Research (Daily Tracking)	October 21–23, 2008	52%	45%	7	3,000 LV	±2%
ABC News/Washington Post (Daily Tracking)	October 20–23, 2008	53%	44%	9	1,321 LV	Not reported
Diageo/The Hotline/Financial Dynamics (Daily Tracking)	October 20–22, 2008	48%	43%	5	769 LV	±3.5%
CBS News/New York Times	October 19–22, 2008	54%	41%	13	771 LV	Not reported
Big Ten	October 19–22, 2008	52%	43%	9	1,014 LV	Not reported
Investors Business Daily/TIPP (Daily Tracking)	October 18–22, 2008	44.8%	43.7%	1.1	1,072 LV	±3%
The Economist/YouGov	October 20–21, 2008	49%	41%	8	998 RV	±4%
Fox News/Opinion Dynamics Corporation	October 20–21, 2008	49%	40%	9	936 LV	±3%
Gallup (Daily Tracking Model II)	October 19–21, 2008	52%	44%	8	2,420 LV	±2%
Reuters/C-SPAN/Zogby International (Daily Tracking)	October 18–20, 2008	50.3%	42.4%	7.9	1,214 LV	±2.9%
Rasmussen Reports/Pulse Opinion Research (Daily Tracking)	October 18–20, 2008	50%	46%	4	3,000 LV	±2%
American Research Group	October 18–20, 2008	49%	45%	4	1,200 LV	±3%
NBC News/Wall Street Journal	October 17–20, 2008	52%	42%	10	1,159 RV	±2.9%
George Washington University/Tarrance Group/Lake Research Partners (Daily Tracking)	October 14–16, 19–20, 2008	48%	47%	1	1,000 LV	±3.1%
CNN/Opinion Research Corporation	October 17–19, 2008	51%	46%	5	746 LV	±3.5%
Diageo/The Hotline/Financial Dynamics (Daily Tracking)	October 17–19, 2008	47%	42%	7	789 LV	±3.5%
Pew Research Center	October 16–19, 2008	53%	39%	14	2,382 LV	±2.5%
ABC News/Washington Post (Daily Tracking)	October 16–19, 2008	53%	44%	9	1,366 LV	Not reported
Hearst-Argyle/Franklin & Marshall College	October 13–19, 2008	50%	45%	5	Not reported	±3.5%
Gallup (Daily Tracking Model II)	October 16–18, 2008	51%	44%	7	2,590 LV	±2%
Reuters/C-SPAN/Zogby International (Daily Tracking)	October 15–17, 2008	48.3%	44.4%	3.9	1,209 LV	±2.9%
Rasmussen Reports/Pulse Opinion Research (Daily Tracking)	October 15–17, 2008	50%	45%	5	3,000 LV	±2%
Investor's Business Daily/TIPP (Daily Tracking)	October 13–17, 2008	47.2%	39.8%	7.4	Not reported	Not reported
Diageo/The Hotline/Financial Dynamics (Daily Tracking)	October 14–16, 2008	50%	40%	10	804 LV	±3.5%
Gallup (Daily Tracking Model II)	October 13–15, 2008	51%	45%	6	2,312 LV	±2%
Rasmussen Reports/Pulse Opinion Research (Daily Tracking)	October 12–14, 2008	50%	45%	5	3,000 LV	±2%
Reuters/C-SPAN/Zogby International (Daily Tracking)	October 11–14, 2008	48.2%	44.4%	3.8	1,210 LV	±2.9%
Diageo/The Hotline/Financial Dynamics (Daily Tracking)	October 11–13, 2008	48%	42%	6	829 LV	±3.4%
American Research Group	October 11–13, 2008	50%	45%	5	1,200 LV	±3%
Los Angeles Times/Bloomberg	October 10–13, 2008	50%	41%	9	1,030 LV	±3%
CBS News/New York Times	October 10–13, 2008	53%	39%	14	699 LV	Not reported
George Washington University/Tarrance Group/Lake Research Partners (Daily Tracking)	October 8–9, 12–13, 2008	53%	40%	13	800 LV	±3.5%
The Economist/YouGov	October 11–12, 2008	48%	42%	6	998 RV	±4%
USA Today/Gallup (Model II)	October 10–12, 2008	52%	45%	7	1,030 LV	±3%
Pew Research Center	October 9–12, 2008	49%	42%	7	1,191 LV	Not reported
Democracy Corps/Greenberg Quinlan Rosner (D)	October 8−12, 2008	51%	42%	9	1,000 LV	Not reported
Investor's Business Daily/TIPP (Daily Tracking)	October 6–12, 2008	44.8%	42.7%	2.1	825 LV	±3.3%
Rasmussen Reports/Pulse Opinion Research (Daily Tracking)	October 9–11, 2008	51%	45%	6	3,000 LV	±2%
ABC News/Washington Post	October 8–11, 2008	53%	43%	10	766 LV	±3.5%
Diageo/The Hotline/Financial Dynamics	October 8–10, 2008	50%	40%	10	808 LV	±3.5%
Reuters/C-SPAN/Zogby International (Daily Tracking)	October 7–10, 2008	47.6%	43.8%	3.8	1,208 LV	±2.9%
Newsweek/Princeton Survey Research Associates International	October 8–9, 2008	52%	41%	11	1,035 RV	±3.7%
Fox News/Opinion Dynamics Corporation	October 8–9, 2008	46%	39%	7	900 RV	±3%
Rasmussen Reports/Pulse Opinion Research (Daily Tracking)	October 6–8, 2008	50%	45%	5	3,000 LV	±2%
Diageo/The Hotline/Financial Dynamics	October 5–7, 2008	45%	44%	1	904 LV	±3.3%
Gallup (Daily Tracking)	October 5–7, 2008	52%	41%	11	2,747 RV	±2%
George Washington University/Tarrance Group/Lake Research Partners	October 2, 5–7, 2008	49%	45%	4	800 LV	±3.5%
The Economist/YouGov	October 4–6, 2008	46%	43%	3	999 RV	±4%
Reuters/C-SPAN/Zogby International (Daily Tracking)	October 4–6, 2008	47.7%	45.3%	2.4	1,237 LV	±2.8%
American Research Group	October 4–6, 2008	49%	45%	4	1,200 LV	±3%
Time/Schulman, Bucuvalas, & Ronca Inc. (SRBI)	October 3–6, 2008	50%	44%	6	1,053 LV	±3%
NBC News/Wall Street Journal	October 4–5, 2008	49%	43%	6	658 RV	±3.8%
Rasmussen Reports/Pulse Opinion Research (Daily Tracking)	October 3–5, 2008	52%	44%	8	3,000 LV	±2%
CBS News	October 3–5, 2008	48%	45%	3	616 LV	Not reported
CNN/Opinion Research Corporation	October 3–5, 2008	53%	45%	8	694 LV	±3.5%
Democracy Corps/Greenberg Quinlan Rosner (D)	October 1–5, 2008	48%	45%	3	1,000 LV	Not reported
Diageo/The Hotline/Financial Dynamics	October 2–4, 2008	48%	41%	7	915 LV	±3.2%
Gallup (Daily Tracking)	October 2–4, 2008	50%	43%	7	2,728 RV	±2%
Zogby Interactive	October 2–3, 2008	48.4%	43.8%	4.6	2,873 LV	±1.9%
Rasmussen Reports/Pulse Opinion Research (Daily Tracking)	September 30–October 2, 2008	51%	44%	7	3,000 LV	±2%
Diageo/The Hotline/Financial Dynamics (Daily Tracking)	September 29–October 1, 2008	47%	42%	5	908 RV	±3.3%
Gallup (Daily Tracking)	September 29–October 1, 2009	48%	43%	5	2,747 RV	±2%
George Washington University/Tarrance Group/Lake Research Partners	September 28–October 1, 2008	49%	44%	5	800 LV	±3.5%
Marist College	September 28–30, 2008	49%	44%	5	943 LV	±3.5%
Democracy Corps/Greenberg Quinlan Rosner (D)	September 28–30, 2008	49%	45%	4	1,000 LV	Not reported
CBS News	September 27–30, 2008	50%	41%	9	769 LV	Not reported
Associated Press/GfK Group/Roper	September 27–30, 2008	48%	41%	7	808 LV	±3.4%
American Research Group	September 27–29, 2008	49%	45%	4	1,200 LV	±3%
ABC News/Washington Post	September 27–29, 2008	50%	46%	4	916 LV	±3%
Pew Research Center	September 27–29, 2008	49%	43%	6	1,181 LV	±4%
The Economist/Polimetrix/YouGov	September 27–29, 2008	47%	42%	5	988 RV	Not reported
Rasmussen Reports/Pulse Opinion Research (Daily Tracking)	September 27–29, 2008	51%	45%	6	3,000 LV	±2%
Time/Schulman, Bucuvalas, & Ronca Inc. (SRBI)	September 26–29, 2008	50%	43%	7	1,133 LV	±3%
McClatchy/Ipsos	September 26–29, 2008	48%	45%	3	1,007 RV	±3.1%
Gallup (Daily Tracking)	September 26–28, 2008	50%	42%	8	2,732 RV	±2%
Diageo/The Hotline/Financial Dynamics (Daily Tracking)	September 26–28, 2008	47%	42%	5	903 RV	±3.3%
Zogby Interactive	September 26–27, 2008	47.1%	45.9%	1.2	2,102 LV	±2.2%
Rasmussen Reports/Pulse Opinion Research (Daily Tracking)	September 24–26, 2008	50%	44%	6	3,000 LV	±2%
Gallup (Daily Tracking)	September 23–25, 2008	48%	45%	3	2,736 RV	±2%
Zogby Interactive	September 23–25, 2008	43.8%	45.8%	2	4,752 LV	±1.5%
Diageo/The Hotline/Financial Dynamics (Daily Tracking)	September 23–25, 2008	49%	42%	7	913 RV	±3.2%
George Washington University/Tarrance Group/Lake Research Partners	September 21–25, 2008	46%	48%	2	1,000 LV	±3.1%
CBS News/New York Times	September 22–24, 2008	48%	43%	5	Not reported	Not reported
The Economist/Polimetrix/YouGov	September 22–24, 2008	46%	43%	3	985 RV	Not reported
Democracy Corps/Greenberg Quinlan Rosner (D)	September 22−24, 2008	47%	44%	3	1,007	Not reported
Marist College	September 22–23, 2008	49%	44%	5	698 LV	±4%
Fox News/Opinion Dynamics Corporation	September 22–23, 2008	45%	39%	6	900 RV	±3%
Rasmussen Reports/Pulse Opinion Research (Daily Tracking)	September 21–23, 2008	49%	47%	2	3,000 LV	±2%
Gallup (Daily Tracking)	September 20–22, 2008	47%	44%	3	2,740 RV	±2%
American Research Group	September 20–22, 2008	48%	46%	2	1,200 LV	±3%
Diageo/The Hotline/Financial Dynamics (Daily Tracking)	September 20–22, 2008	47%	43%	4	906 RV	±3.3%
NBC News/Wall Street Journal	September 20–22, 2008	48%	46%	2	1,085 RV	±3.0%
Los Angeles Times/Bloomberg	September 19–22, 2008	49%	45%	4	838 LV	Not reported
ABC News/Washington Post	September 19–22, 2008	52%	43%	9	780 LV	Not reported
McClatchy/Ipsos	September 18–22, 2008	44%	43%	1	923 RV	±3.2%
CNN/Opinion Research Corporation	September 19–21, 2008	51%	47%	4	697 LV	Not reported
Hearst-Argyle/Franklin & Marshall College	September 15–21, 2008	45%	47%	2	1,320 RV	±2.7%
Zogby Interactive	September 19–20, 2008	46.8%	43.4%	3.4	2,331 LV	±2.1%
Rasmussen Reports/Pulse Opinion Research (Daily Tracking)	September 18–20, 2008	47%	46%	1	3,000 LV	±2%
Gallup (Daily Tracking)	September 17–19, 2008	50%	44%	6	2,756 RV	±2%
Diageo/The Hotline/Financial Dynamics (Daily Tracking)	September 17–19, 2008	45%	44%	1	922 RV	±3.2%
George Washington University/Tarrance Group/Lake Research Partners	September 11, 14, 17–18, 2008	47%	47%	Tied	800 LV	±3%
Rasmussen Reports/Pulse Opinion Research (Daily Tracking)	September 15–17, 2008	48%	48%	Tied	3,000 LV	±2%
Big Ten	September 14–17, 2008	46%	45.1%	0.9	1,114 RV	±3%
The Economist/Polimetrix/YouGov	September 15–16, 2008	43%	45%	2	917 RV	Not reported
Diageo/The Hotline/Financial Dynamics (Daily Tracking)	September 14–16, 2008	45%	42%	3	913 RV	±3.2%
Gallup (Daily Tracking)	September 14–16, 2008	47%	45%	2	2,787 RV	±2%
CBS News/New York Times	September 12–16, 2008	49%	44%	5	Not reported	Not reported
American Research Group	September 13–15, 2008	45%	48%	3	1,200 LV	±3%
Rasmussen Reports/Pulse Opinion Research (Daily Tracking)	September 12–14, 2008	47%	49%	2	3,000 LV	±2%
Pew Research Center	September 9–14, 2008	46%	46%	Tied	2,307 LV	Not reported
Gallup (Daily Tracking)	September 11–13, 2008	45%	47%	2	2,787 RV	±2%
Diageo/The Hotline/Financial Dynamics (Daily Tracking)	September 11–13, 2002	45%	43%	2	904 RV	±3.3%
Reuters/Zogby International	September 11–13, 2008	47%	45%	2	1,008 LV	±3.1%
Newsweek/Princeton Survey Research Associates International	September 10–11, 2008	46%	46%	Tied	1,038 RV	±3.8%
Rasmussen Reports/Pulse Opinion Research (Daily Tracking)	September 9–11, 2008	46%	49%	3	3,000 LV	±2%
George Washington University/Tarrance Group/Lake Research Partners	September 7–11, 2008	44%	48%	4	1,000 LV	±3.1%
Diageo/The Hotline/Financial Dynamics (Daily Tracking))	September 8–10, 2008	44%	46%	2	918 RV	±3.2%
Gallup (Daily Tracking)	September 8–10, 2008	44%	48%	4	2,718 RV	±2%
Democracy Corps/Greenberg Quinlan Rosner (D)	September 5–10, 2008	46%	48%	2	1,000 LV	Not reported
Associated Press/GfK Group/Roper	September 5–10, 2008	44%	48%	4	812 LV	±3.4%
Fox News/Opinion Dynamics Corporation	September 8–9, 2008	42%	45%	3	900 RV	±3%
The Economist/Polimetrix/YouGov	September 7–9, 2008	41%	40%	1	877 RV	Not reported
McClatchy/Ipsos	September 5–9, 2008	45%	46%	1	876 RV	±3.3%
Poll Position/InsiderAdvantage	September 8, 2008	46%	46%	Tied	807 LV	±3.36%
NBC News/Wall Street Journal	September 6–8, 2008	47%	46%	1	860 RV	±3.3%
American Research Group	September 6–8, 2008	47%	46%	1	1,200 LV	±3%
Public Opinion Strategies (R)	September 6–8, 2008	43%	46%	3	800 LV	Not reported
Rasmussen Reports/Pulse Opinion Research (Daily Tracking)	September 6–8, 2008	48%	48%	Tied	3,000 LV	±2%
USA Today/Gallup	September 5–7, 2008	44%	54%	10	823 LV	±4.0%
ABC News/Washington Post	September 5–7, 2008	47%	49%	2	Not reported	Not reported
Diageo/The Hotline/Financial Dynamics (Daily Tracking)	September 5–7, 2008	44%	44%	Tied	924 RV	±3.2%
CNN/Opinion Research Corporation	September 5–7, 2008	48%	48%	Tied	942 RV	±3%
Investor's Business Daily/TIPP	September 2–7, 2008	45%	40%	5	868 RV	±3.3%
Gallup (Daily Tracking)	September 4–6, 2008	45%	48%	3	2,765 RV	±2%
Rasmussen Reports/Pulse Opinion Research (Daily Tracking)	September 3–5, 2008	49%	46%	3	3,000 LV	±2%
Diageo/The Hotline/Financial Dynamics (Daily Tracking)	September 2–4, 2008	46%	40%	6	916 RV	±3.2%
CBS News	September 1–3, 2008	42%	42%	Tied	734 RV	±4%
The Economist/Polimetrix/YouGov	September 1−3, 2008	42%	39%	3	883 RV	Not reported
Democracy Corps/Greenberg Quinlan Rosner (D)	September 1–3, 2008	49%	44%	5	1,000 LV	Not reported
Gallup (Daily Tracking)	September 1–3, 2008	49%	42%	7	2,771 RV	±2%
Rasmussen Reports/Pulse Opinion Research (Daily Tracking)	August 31–September 2, 2008	50%	45%	5	3,000 LV	±2%
American Research Group	August 30–September 1, 2008	49%	43%	6	1,200 LV	±3%
USA Today/Gallup	August 30–31, 2008	50%	43%	7	1,835 RV	±3%
Diageo/The Hotline/Financial Dynamics	August 29–31, 2008	48%	39%	9	805 RV	±3.5%
CNN/Opinion Research Corporation	August 29–31, 2008	49%	48%	1	927 RV	±3%
CBS News	August 29–31, 2008	48%	40%	8	781 RV	±4%
Zogby Interactive	August 29–30, 2008	44.6%	47.1%	2.5	2,020 LV	±2.2%
Rasmussen Reports/Pulse Opinion Research (Daily Tracking)	August 28–30, 2008	49%	46%	3	3,000 LV	±2%
Gallup (Daily Tracking)	August 27–29, 2008	49%	41%	8	2,709 RV	±2%
Rasmussen Reports/Pulse Opinion Research (Daily Tracking)	August 25–27, 2008	47%	47%	Tied	3,000 LV	±2%
The Economist/Polimetrix/YouGov	August 25–26, 2008	41%	36%	5	847 RV	Not reported
Gallup (Daily Tracking)	August 24–26, 2008	45%	44%	1	2,724 RV	±2%
CNN/Opinion Research Corporation	August 23–24, 2008	47%	47%	Tied	909 RV	±3.5%
Zogby Interactive	August 23–24, 2008	46%	44%	2	2,248 LV	±2.1%
Rasmussen Reports/Pulse Opinion Research (Daily Tracking)	August 22–24, 2008	48%	45%	3	3,000 LV	±2%
Diageo/The Hotline/Financial Dynamics	August 18–24, 2008	44%	40%	4	1,022 RV	±3%
USA Today/Gallup	August 21–23, 2008	48%	45%	3	765 LV	±4%
ABC News/Washington Post	August 19–22, 2008	49%	45%	4	Not reported	Not reported
Rasmussen Reports/Pulse Opinion Research (Daily Tracking)	August 19–21, 2008	47%	46%	1	3,000 LV	±2%
Fox News/Opinion Dynamics Corporation	August 19–20, 2008	42%	39%	3	900 RV	±3%
The Economist/Polimetrix/YouGov	August 18–20, 2008	39%	38%	1	915 RV	Not reported
Gallup (Daily Tracking)	August 17–19, 2008	45%	43%	2	2,658 RV	±2%
CBS News/New York Times	August 15–19, 2008	45%	42%	3	869 RV	±3%
Rasmussen Reports/Pulse Opinion Research (Daily Tracking)	August 16–18, 2008	47%	45%	2	3,000 LV	±2%
Los Angeles Times/Bloomberg	August 15–18, 2008	45%	43%	2	1,248 RV	Not reported
NBC News/Wall Street Journal	August 15–18, 2008	45%	42%	3	1,005 RV	±3.1%
Quinnipiac University	August 12–17, 2008	47%	42%	5	1,547 LV	±2.5%
Reuters/Zogby International	August 14–16, 2008	41%	46%	5	1,089 LV	±3.0%
Gallup (Daily Tracking)	August 14–16, 2008	45%	45%	1	2,671 RV	±2%
Rasmussen Reports/Pulse Opinion Research (Daily Tracking)	August 13–15, 2008	46%	45%	1	3,000 LV	±2%
George Washington University/Tarrance Group/Lake Research Partners	August 10–14, 2008	46%	47%	1	1,000 LV	±3.1%
The Economist/Polimetrix/YouGov	August 11–13, 2008	41%	40%	1	908 RV	Not reported
Gallup (Daily Tracking)	August 11–13, 2008	46%	43%	3	2,673 RV	±2%
Rasmussen Reports/Pulse Opinion Research Center (Daily Tracking)	August 10–12, 2008	48%	46%	2	3,000 LV	±2%
Gallup (Daily Tracking)	August 8–10, 2008	47%	42%	5	2,648 RV	±2%
Pew Research Center	July 31–August 10, 2008	47%	42%	5	2,414 RV	±2.5%
Rasmussen Reports/Pulse Opinion Research (Daily Tracking)	August 7–9, 2008	48%	46%	2	3,000 LV	±2%
Investor's Business Daily/TIPP	August 4–9, 2008	43%	38%	5	925 RV	Not reported
Gallup (Daily Tracking)	August 5–7, 2008	46%	43%	3	2,718 RV	±2%
Harris Interactive	August 1–7, 2008	47%	38%	9	2,488 RV	Not reported
Sacred Heart University	July 28–August 7, 2008	37.8%	27%	10.8	800 A	Not reported
Rasmussen Reports/Pulse Opinion Research (Daily Tracking)	August 4–6, 2008	47%	46%	1	3,000 LV	±2%
The Economist/Polimetrix/YouGov	August 4–6, 2008	42%	39%	3	922 RV	Not reported
CBS News	July 31–August 5, 2008	45%	39%	6	851 RV	Not reported
Gallup (Daily Tracking)	August 2–4, 2008	47%	43%	4	2,674 RV	±2%
Associated Press/Ipsos	July 31–August 4, 2008	48%	42%	6	833 RV	±3.4%
Time/Schulman, Bucuvalas, & Ronca Inc. (SRBI)	July 31–August 4, 2008	46%	41%	5	808 LV	±3.5%
Rasmussen Reports/Pulse Opinion Research (Daily Tracking)	August 1–3, 2008	46%	47%	1	3,000 LV	±2%
Gallup (Daily Tracking)	July 31–August 1, 2008	45%	44%	1	2,684 RV	±2%
Rasmussen Reports/Pulse Opinion Research (Daily Tracking)	July 29–31, 2008	47%	46%	1	3,000 LV	±2%
Gallup (Daily Tracking)	July 28–30, 2008	45%	44%	1	2,679 RV	±2%
Rasmussen Reports/Pulse Opinion Research (Daily Tracking)	July 26–28, 2008	47%	46%	1	3,000 LV	±2%
The Economist/Polimetrix/YouGov	July 26–27, 2008	44%	37%	7	932 RV	Not reported
CNN/Opinion Research Corporation	July 25–27, 2008	51%	44%	7	914 RV	±3%
USA Today/Gallup	July 25–27, 2008	45%	49%	4	791 LV	±4%
Pew Research Center	July 23–27, 2008	47%	42%	5	1,241 RV	±3.5%
Rasmussen Reports/Pulse Opinion Research (Daily Tracking)	July 23–25, 2008	49%	43%	6	3,000 LV	±2%
The Economist/Polimetrix/YouGov	July 22–24, 2008	41%	38%	3	921 RV	Not reported
Democracy Corps/Greenberg Quinlan Rosner (D)	July 21–24, 2008	50%	45%	6	1,004 LV	Not reported
Fox News/Opinion Dynamics Corporation	July 22–23, 2008	41%	40%	1	900 RV	±3%
Gallup (Daily Tracking)	July 21–23, 2008	45%	43%	2	2,660 RV	±2%
Rasmussen Reports/Pulse Opinion Research (Daily Tracking)	July 20–22, 2008	47%	45%	2	3,000 LV	±2%
NBC News/Wall Street Journal	July 18–21, 2008	47%	41%	6	1,003 RV	±3.1%
Gallup (Daily Tracking)	July 18–20, 2008	47%	41%	6	2,653 RV	±2%
Rasmussen Reports/Pulse Opinion Research (Daily Tracking)	July 17–19, 2008	47%	45%	2	3,000 LV	±2%
The Economist/Polimetrix/YouGov	July 15–17, 2008	41%	36%	5	999 A	±4%
Gallup (Daily Tracking)	July 15–17, 2008	45%	44%	1	2,641 RV	±2%
Rasmussen Reports/Pulse Opinion Research (Daily Tracking)	July 14–16, 2008	46%	46%	Tied	3,000 LV	±2%
Gallup (Daily Tracking)	July 12–14, 2008	47%	43%	4	2,637 RV	±2%
CBS News/New York Times	July 7–14, 2008	45%	39%	6	1,462 RV	±3%
Rasmussen Reports/Pulse Opinion Research (Daily Tracking)	July 11–13, 2008	46%	43%	3	3,000 LV	±2%
ABC News/Washington Post	July 10–13, 2008	49%	46%	3	Not reported	Not reported
Reuters/Zogby International	July 9–13, 2008	47%	40%	7	1,039 LV	±3.1%
Quinnipiac University	July 8–13, 2008	50%	41%	9	1,725 LV	±2.4%
Gallup (Daily Tracking)	July 9–11, 2008	47%	43%	4	2,641 RV	±2%
Investor's Business Daily/TIPP	July 7–11, 2008	40%	37%	3	854 RV	Not reported
Harris Interactive	July 3–11, 2008	44%	35%	9	Not reported	Not reported
Newsweek/Princeton Survey Research Associates International	July 9–10, 2008	44%	41%	3	1,037 RV	±3.6%
Rasmussen Reports/Pulse Opinion Research (Daily Tracking)	July 8–10, 2008	47%	45%	2	3,000 LV	±2%
The Economist/Polimetrix/YouGov	July 7–9, 2008	39%	38%	1	997 A	±4%
Gallup (Daily Tracking)	July 6–8, 2008	46%	44%	2	2,666 RV	±2%
Rasmussen Reports/Pulse Opinion Research (Daily Tracking)	July 2, 6–7, 2008	49%	43%	6	3,000 LV	±2%
Gallup (Daily Tracking)	July 2–3, 5, 2008	48%	42%	6	2,620 RV	±2%
The Economist/Polimetrix/YouGov	July 1–2, 2008	37%	34%	3	998 A	±4%
Gallup (Daily Tracking)	June 30–July 2, 2008	47%	43%	4	2,641 RV	±2%
Rasmussen Reports/Pulse Opinion Research (Daily Tracking)	June 29–July 1, 2008	49%	44%	5	3,000 LV	±2%
CNN/Opinion Research Corporation	June 26–29, 2008	50%	45%	5	906 RV	±3.5%
McLaughlin & Associates	June 26–29, 2008	46%	38%	8	1,000 LV	±3.1%
Gallup (Daily Tracking)	June 26, 28–29, 2008	46%	42%	4	2,656 RV	±2%
Pew Research Center	June 18–29, 2008	48%	40%	8	1,574 RV	Not reported
Rasmussen Reports/Pulse Opinion Research (Daily Tracking)	June 26–28, 2008	49%	43%	6	3,000 LV	±2%
The Economist/Polimetrix/YouGov	June 23–25, 2008	36%	34%	2	991 A	±4%
Gallup (Daily Tracking)	June 23–25, 2008	44%	44%	Tied	2,605 RV	±2%
Rasmussen Reports/Pulse Opinion Research (Daily Tracking)	June 23–25, 2008	49%	45%	4	3,000 LV	±2%
Democracy Corps/Greenberg Quinlan Rosner (D)	June 22–25, 2008	49%	45%	4	2,000 LV	Not reported
Time/Schulman, Ronca, & Bucuvalas Inc. (SRBI)	June 18−25, 2008	47%	43%	4	803 LV	±3%
Los Angeles Times/Bloomberg	June 19–23, 2008	49%	37%	12	1,115 RV	±3%
Associated Press/Yahoo News/Knowledge Networks	June 13–23, 2008	40%	39%	1	1,507 RV	±2.5%
Gallup (Daily Tracking)	June 20–22, 2008	46%	43%	3	2,608 RV	±2%
Rasmussen Reports/Pulse Opinion Research (Daily Tracking)	June 20–22, 2008	49%	43%	5	3,000 LV	±2%
Hearst-Argyle/Franklin & Marshall College	June 15–22, 2008	42%	36%	6	1,501 RV	±2.5%
Newsweek/Princeton Survey Research Associates International	June 18–19, 2008	51%	36%	15	896 RV	±4%
Rasmussen Reports/Pulse Opinion Research	June 17–19, 2008	48%	44%	4	3,000 LV	±2%
USA Today/Gallup	June 15–19, 2008	50%	44%	6	1,310 LV	±3%
Fox News/Opinion Dynamics	June 17–18, 2008	45%	41%	4	900 RV	±3%
The Economist/Polimetrix/YouGov	June 16–17, 2008	37%	34%	3	1,000 A	±4%
Rasmussen Reports/Pulse Opinion Research (Daily Tracking)	June 14–16, 2008	48%	44%	4	3,000 LV	±2%
ABC News/Washington Post	June 12–15, 2008	49%	45%	3	Not reported	Not reported
Reuters/Zogby International	June 12–14, 2008	47%	42%	5	1,113 LV	±3.0%
Rasmussen Reports/Pulse Opinion Research (Daily Tracking)	June 11–13, 2008	49%	43%	6	3,000 LV	±2%
Gallup (Daily Tracking)	June 10, 12–13, 2008	45%	42%	3	2,691 RV	±2%
Harris Interactive	June 5–13, 2008	44%	33%	11	Not reported	Not reported
The Economist/Polimetrix/YouGov	June 10–11, 2008	37%	33%	4	996 A	±4%
Ipsos	June 5–11, 2008	50%	43%	7	467 LV	Not reported
Rasmussen Reports/Pulse Opinion Research (Daily Tracking)	June 8–10, 2008	49%	44%	5	3,000 LV	±2%
Gallup (Daily Tracking)	June 7–9, 2008	48%	41%	7	2,633 RV	±2%
NBC News/Wall Street Journal	June 6–9, 2008	47%	41%	6	1,000 RV	±3.1%
Diageo/The Hotline/Financial Dynamics	June 5–8, 2008	44%	42%	2	806 RV	±3.5%
Investor's Business Daily/TIPP	June 2–8, 2008	42.5%	40.4%	2.1	916 RV	Not reported
Rasmussen Reports/Pulse Opinion Research (Daily Tracking)	June 5–7, 2008	50%	43%	7	3,000 LV	±2%
Gallup (Daily Tracking)	June 2–6, 2008	46%	45%	1	4,408 RV	±2%
Rasmussen Reports/Pulse Opinion Research (Daily Tracking)	June 2–4, 2008	47%	45%	2	3,000 LV	±2%
Cook Political Report/RT Strategies	May 29–31, 2008	44%	43%	1	802 RV	±3.5%
Lombardo Consulting Group	May 26–28, 2008	44%	40%	4	1,000 RV	Not reported
Democracy Corps/Greenberg Quinlan Rosner (D)	May 19–26, 2008	47%	47%	Tied	1,600 LV	Not reported

Three-way contest

Poll Source	Date	Barack Obama (D)	John McCain (R)	Ralph Nader (I)	Sample size	Margin of error
McClatchy/Ipsos	October 30–November 1, 2008	50%	42%	1%	760 LV	±3.6%
Associated Press/Yahoo News/Knowledge Networks	June 13–23, 2008	40%	39%	3%	1,507 RV	±2.5%

=== Four-way contest ===
Poll Source	Date	Barack Obama (D)	John McCain (R)	Bob Barr (L)	Ralph Nader (I)	Sample size	Margin of error		
Tarrance Group	November 2–3, 2008	50.2%	48.3%	0.9%	0.6%	800 LV	±3.5%		
Lake Research Partners	November 2–3, 2008	51.5%	46.5%	1%	1%	800 LV	±3.5%		
Harris Interactive	October 30–November 3, 2008	52%	44%	1%	1%	3,946 LV	Not reported		
Democracy Corps/Greenberg Quinlan Rosner (D)	October 30–November 2, 2008	51%	44%	2%	1%	1,000 LV	Not reported		
McClatchy/Ipsos	October 23–27, 2008	48%	42%	1%	1%	831 LV	±3.4%		
Harris Interactive	October 20–27, 2008	50%	44%	1%	2%	1,590 LV	Not reported		
Associated Press/Yahoo News/Knowledge Networks	October 17–27, 2008	51%	43%	1%	2%	Not reported	Not reported		
Pew Research Center	October 23−26, 2008	53%	38%	0%	2%	1,198 LV	±3.5%		
Democracy Corps/Greenberg Quinlan Rosner (D)	October 21–23, 2008	52%	43%	1%	2%	1,000 LV	Not reported		
George Washington University/Tarrance Group/Lake Research Partners (Daily Tracking)	October 16, 19–22, 2008	48%	45%	1%	2%	1,000 LV	±3.5%		
Harris Interactive	October 16–20, 2008	50%	44%	1%	1%	1,390 LV	Not reported		
Associated Press/GfK Group/Roper	October 16–20, 2008	44%	43%	1%	1%	800 LV	±3.5%		
McClatchy/Ipsos	October 16–20, 2008	50%	42%	0%	1%	773 LV	±3.5%		
Democracy Corps/Greenberg Quinlan Rosner (D)	October 15–19, 2008	49%	44%	2%	3%	1,000 LV	Not reported		
McClatchy/Ipsos	October 9–13, 2008	48%	39%	1%	2%	1,036 RV	±3.0%		
Associated Press/Yahoo News/Knowledge Networks	October 3–13, 2008	49%	44%	1%	1%	1,528 LV	±2.5%		
George Washington University/Tarrance Group/Lake Research Partners (Daily Tracking)	October 6–9, 2008	51%	41%	1%	2%	800 LV	±3.5%		
McClatchy/Ipsos	October 2–6, 2008	47%	40%	1%	3%	858 RV	±3.3%		
George Washington University/Tarrance Group/Lake Research Partners (Daily Tracking)	October 2–5, 2008	48%	44%	1%	2%	800 LV	±3.5%		
Associated Press/GfK Group/Roper	September 27–30, 2008	48%	41%	1%	2%	808 LV	±3.4%		
McClatchy/Ipsos	September 26–29, 2008	46%	42%	1%	2%	1,007 RV	±3.1%		
George Washington University/Tarrance Group/Lake Research Partners	September 21–25, 2008	45%	47%	1%	2%	1,000 LV	±3.1%		
Harris Interactive	September 15–22, 2008	47%	46%	1%	2%	1,590 LV	Not reported		
McClatchy/Ipsos	September 11–15, 2008	45%	45%	1%	2%	1,046 RV	±3%		
Associated Press/Yahoo News/Knowledge Networks	September 5–15, 2008	42%	44%	1%	2%	1,546 RV	±2.5%		
Reuters/Zogby International	September 11–13, 2008	45%	45%	1-2%	1-2%	1,008 LV	±3.1%		
George Washington University/Tarrance Group/Lake Research Partners	September 7−11, 2008	44%	48%	1%	1%	1,000 LV	±3.1%		
Associated Press/GfK Group/Roper	September 5–10, 2008	44%	48%	1%	1%	812 LV	±3.4%		
Associated Press/Yahoo News/Stanford University/Knowledge Networks	August 27–September 5, 2008	43%	39%	1%	2%	1,728 RV	±2.4%		
Zogby Interactive	August 29–30, 2008	44%	43%	5%	2%	2,020 LV	±2.2%		
Reuters/Zogby International	August 14–16, 2008	39%	44%	3%	2%	1,089 LV	±3.0%		
Zogby Interactive	August 12–14, 2008	43%	40%	6%	2%	3,339 LV	±1.7%		
Associated Press/Ipsos	July 31–August 4, 2008	47%	41%	2%	3%	833 RV	±3.4%		
Associated TV/Zogby International	July 31–August 1, 2008	41%	42%	2%	2%	1,011 LV	±3.1%		
Fox News/Opinion Dynamics Corporation	July 22–23, 2008	40%	37%	0%	2%	900 RV	±3%		
ABC News/Washington Post	July 10–13, 2008	49%	39%	2%	5%	Not reported	Not reported		
Reuters/Zogby International	July 9–13, 2008	46%	36%	3%	3%	1,039 LV	±3,1%		
Los Angeles Times/Bloomberg	June 19–23, 2008	48%	33%	Bob Barr	4%	Ralph Nader	3%	1,115 RV	±3%
Fox News/Opinion Dynamics Corporation	June 17–18, 2008	42%	39%	2%	4%	900 RV	±3%		
ABC News/Washington Post	June 12–15, 2008	49%	39%	2%	5%	Not reported	Not reported		
CNN/Opinion Research Corporation	June 4–5, 2008	47%	43%	2%	6%	921 RV	±3%		

=== Five-way contest ===
Poll Source	Date	Barack Obama (D)	John McCain (R)	Bob Barr (L)	Cynthia McKinney (G)	Ralph Nader (I)	Sample size	Margin of error
CNN/Opinion Research Corporation	October 30–November 1, 2008	51%	43%	1%	1%	2%	714 LV	±3.5%
Zogby Interactive	Sept. 26–27, 2008	46.4%	43.4%	3.7%	0.6%	1.0%	2,102 LV	±2.2%
CNN/Opinion Research Corporation	Sept. 19–21, 2008	48%	45%	1%	1%	4%	909 RV	±3%
Zogby Interactive	August 23–24, 2008	45%	43%	4%	1%	1%	2,248 LV	±2.1%

== Earlier polls ==
=== Two-way contest ===
Related article: Graphical Representations of Two-Way Contest Data

==== Democratic nominee vs. Republican nominee ====
Poll Source	Date administered	Democrat	%	Republican	%	Sample size	Margin of error
CNN/Opinion Research Corporation	June 4–5, 2008	Hillary Clinton	49%	John McCain	48%	921 RV	±3%
CNN/Opinion Research Corporation	June 4–5, 2008	Barack Obama	49%	John McCain	46%	921 RV	±3%
CBS News	May 30–June 3, 2008	Hillary Clinton	50%	John McCain	41%	930 RV	±4%
CBS News	May 30–June 3, 2008	Barack Obama	48%	John McCain	42%	930 RV	±4%
USA Today/Gallup	May 30–June 1, 2008	Hillary Clinton	48%	John McCain	44%	803 LV	±4%
USA Today/Gallup	May 30–June 1, 2008	Barack Obama	49%	John McCain	44%	803 LV	±4%
Rasmussen Reports/Pulse Opinion Research (Daily Tracking)	May 29–June 1, 2008	Hillary Clinton	44%	John McCain	46%	1,600 LV	±3%
Rasmussen Reports/Pulse Opinion Research (Daily Tracking)	May 29–June 1, 2008	Barack Obama	45%	John McCain	45%	1,600 LV	±3%
Gallup (Daily Tracking)	May 24–25, 27–29, 2008	Hillary Clinton	47%	John McCain	45%	4,368 RV	±2%
Gallup (Daily Tracking)	May 24–25, 27–29, 2008	Barack Obama	46%	John McCain	45%	4,368 RV	±2%
The Economist/Polimetrix/YouGov	May 27–28, 2008	Hillary Clinton	42%	John McCain	44%	997 A	±4%
The Economist/Polimetrix/YouGov	May 27–28, 2008	Barack Obama	38%	John McCain	48%	995 A	±4%
Rasmussen Reports/Pulse Opinion Research (Daily Tracking)	May 25–28, 2008	Hillary Clinton	46%	John McCain	46%	1,600 LV	±3%
Rasmussen Reports/Pulse Opinion Research (Daily Tracking)	May 25–28, 2008	Barack Obama	42%	John McCain	47%	1,600 LV	±3%
Pew Research Center	May 21–25, 2008	Hillary Clinton	48%	John McCain	44%	1,242 RV	±3.5%
Pew Research Center	May 21–25, 2008	Barack Obama	47%	John McCain	44%	1,242 RV	±3.5%
Rasmussen Reports/Pulse Opinion Research (Daily Tracking)	May 21–24, 2008	Hillary Clinton	47%	John McCain	44%	1,600 LV	±3%
Rasmussen Reports/Pulse Opinion Research (Daily Tracking)	May 21–24, 2008	Barack Obama	44%	John McCain	46%	1,600 LV	±3%
Gallup (Daily Tracking)	May 19–23, 2008	Hillary Clinton	49%	John McCain	45%	4,460 RV	±2%
Gallup (Daily Tracking)	May 19–23, 2008	Barack Obama	45%	John McCain	46%	4,460 RV	±2%
Newsweek/Princeton Survey Research Associates International	May 21–22, 2008	Hillary Clinton	48%	John McCain	44%	1,205 RV	±3.5%
Newsweek/Princeton Survey Research Associates International	May 21–22, 2008	Barack Obama	46%	John McCain	46%	1,205 RV	±3.5%
The Economist/Polimetrix/YouGov	May 20–21, 2008	Hillary Clinton	45%	John McCain	40%	994 A	±4%
The Economist/Polimetrix/YouGov	May 20–21, 2008	Barack Obama	43%	John McCain	41%	998 A	±4%
Rasmussen Reports/Pulse Opinion Research (Daily Tracking)	May 17–20, 2008	Hillary Clinton	45%	John McCain	45%	1,600 LV	±3%
Rasmussen Reports/Pulse Opinion Research (Daily Tracking)	May 17–20, 2008	Barack Obama	44%	John McCain	45%	1,600 LV	±3%
Harris Interactive	May 8–19, 2008	Hillary Clinton	39%	John McCain	36%	Not reported	Not reported
Harris Interactive	May 8–19, 2008	Barack Obama	41%	John McCain	47%	Not reported	Not reported
Reuters/Zogby International	May 15–18, 2008	Hillary Clinton	43%	John McCain	43%	1,076 LV	±3.0%
Reuters/Zogby International	May 15–18, 2008	Barack Obama	48%	John McCain	40%	1,076 LV	±3.0%
Gallup (Daily Tracking)	May 14–18, 2008	Hillary Clinton	48%	John McCain	44%	4,444 RV	±2%
Gallup (Daily Tracking)	May 14–18, 2008	Barack Obama	46%	John McCain	45%	4,444 RV	±2%
Investor's Business Daily/TIPP	May 12–18, 2008	Hillary Clinton	44%	John McCain	39%	876 RV	±3.2%
Investor's Business Daily/TIPP	May 12–18, 2008	Barack Obama	48%	John McCain	37%	876 RV	±3.2%
Rasmussen Reports/Pulse Opinion Research (Daily Tracking)	May 13–16, 2008	Hillary Clinton	44%	John McCain	44%	1,600 LV	±3%
Rasmussen Reports/Pulse Opinion Research (Daily Tracking)	May 13–16, 2008	Barack Obama	44%	John McCain	45%	1,600 LV	±3%
The Economist/Polimetrix/YouGov	May 14–15, 2008	Hillary Clinton	44%	John McCain	40%	993 A	±4%
The Economist/Polimetrix/YouGov	May 14–15, 2008	Barack Obama	39%	John McCain	42%	995 A	±4%
Democracy Corps/Greenberg Quinlan Rosner (D)	May 13–15, 2008	Hillary Clinton	43%	John McCain	51%	1014 LV	Not reported
Democracy Corps/Greenberg Quinlan Rosner (D)	May 13–15, 2008	Barack Obama	49%	John McCain	47%	1014 LV	Not reported
George Washington University/Tarrance Group/Lake Research	May 11–14, 2008	Hillary Clinton	49%	John McCain	47%	1,000 LV	±3.1%
George Washington University/Tarrance Group/Lake Research	May 11–14, 2008	Barack Obama	48%	John McCain	46%	1,000 LV	±3.1%
Gallup (Daily Tracking)	May 9–13, 2012	Hillary Clinton	48%	John McCain	45%	4,381 RV	±2%
Gallup (Daily Tracking)	May 9–13, 2012	Barack Obama	46%	John McCain	45%	4,381 RV	±2%
Rasmussen Reports/Pulse Opinion Research (Daily Tracking)	May 9–12, 2008	Hillary Clinton	45%	John McCain	47%	1,600 LV	±3%
Rasmussen Reports/Pulse Opinion Research (Daily Tracking)	May 9–12, 2008	Barack Obama	47%	John McCain	46%	1,600 LV	±3%
Quinnipiac University	May 8–12, 2008	Hillary Clinton	46%	John McCain	41%	1,745 RV	±2.4%
Quinnipiac University	May 8–12, 2008	Barack Obama	47%	John McCain	40%	1,745 RV	±2.4%
ABC News/Washington Post	May 8–11, 2008	Hillary Clinton	49%	John McCain	46%	Not reported	Not reported
ABC News/Washington Post	May 8–11, 2008	Barack Obama	51%	John McCain	44%	Not reported	Not reported
NPR/Public Opinion Strategies/Greenberg Quinlan Rosner	May 7–8, 10, 2008	Hillary Clinton	45%	John McCain	46%	800 LV	±3.46%
NPR/Public Opinion Strategies/Greenberg Quinlan Rosner	May 7–8, 10, 2008	Barack Obama	48%	John McCain	43%	800 LV	±3.46%
Rasmussen Reports/Pulse Opinion Research (Daily Tracking)	May 5–8, 2008	Hillary Clinton	48%	John McCain	43%	1,600 LV	±3%
Rasmussen Reports/Pulse Opinion Research (Daily Tracking)	May 5–8, 2008	Barack Obama	47%	John McCain	44%	1,600 LV	±3%
Gallup (Daily Tracking)	May 4–8, 2008	Hillary Clinton	48%	John McCain	44%	4,348 RV	±2%
Gallup (Daily Tracking)	May 4–8, 2008	Barack Obama	46%	John McCain	45%	4,348 RV	±2%
Los Angeles Times/Bloomberg	May 1–8, 2008	Hillary Clinton	47%	John McCain	38%	1,986 RV	±3%
Los Angeles Times/Bloomberg	May 1–8, 2008	Barack Obama	46%	John McCain	40%	1,986 RV	±3%
The Economist/Polimetrix/YouGov	May 5–6, 2008	Hillary Clinton	39%	John McCain	47%	996 A	±4%
The Economist/Polimetrix/YouGov	May 5–6, 2008	Barack Obama	39%	John McCain	46%	996 A	±4%
Rasmussen Reports/Pulse Opinion Research (Daily Tracking)	May 1–4, 2008	Hillary Clinton	43%	John McCain	47%	1,600 LV	±3%
Rasmussen Reports/Pulse Opinion Research (Daily Tracking)	May 1–4, 2008	Barack Obama	43%	John McCain	47%	1,600 LV	±3%
Ipsos	April 30 – May 4, 2008	Hillary Clinton	47%	John McCain	42%	755 RV	±3.6%
Ipsos	April 30 – May 4, 2008	Barack Obama	46%	John McCain	42%	755 RV	±3.6%
USA Today/Gallup	May 1–3, 2008	Hillary Clinton	46%	John McCain	49%	803 LV	±5%
USA Today/Gallup	May 1–3, 2008	Barack Obama	47%	John McCain	48%	803 LV	±5%
CBS News/New York Times	May 1–3, 2008	Hillary Clinton	53%	John McCain	41%	601 RV	Not reported
CBS News/New York Times	May 1–3, 2008	Barack Obama	51%	John McCain	40%	601 RV	Not reported
Diageo/The Hotline/Financial Dynamics	April 30 – May 3, 2008	Hillary Clinton	46%	John McCain	43%	803 RV	±3.5%
Diageo/The Hotline/Financial Dynamics	April 30 – May 3, 2008	Barack Obama	47%	John McCain	43%	803 RV	±3.5%
The Economist/Polimetrix/YouGov	April 30–May 2, 2008	Hillary Clinton	44%	John McCain	41%	993 A	±4%
The Economist/Polimetrix/YouGov	April 30–May 2, 2008	Barack Obama	43%	John McCain	41%	998 A	±4%
CNN/Opinion Research Corporation	April 28–30, 2008	Hillary Clinton	49%	John McCain	44%	906 RV	±3.5%
CNN/Opinion Research Corporation	April 28–30, 2008	Barack Obama	49%	John McCain	45%	906 RV	±3.5%
Rasmussen Reports/Pulse Opinion Research (Daily Tracking)	April 27–30, 2008	Hillary Clinton	44%	John McCain	44%	1,600 LV	±3%
Rasmussen Reports/Pulse Opinion Research (Daily Tracking)	April 27–30, 2008	Barack Obama	43%	John McCain	46%	1,600 LV	±3%
Gallup (Daily Tracking)	April 26–30, 2008	Hillary Clinton	46%	John McCain	46%	4,369 RV	±2%
Gallup (Daily Tracking)	April 26–30, 2008	Barack Obama	43%	John McCain	47%	4,369 RV	±2%
Fox News/Opinion Dynamics	April 28–29, 2008	Hillary Clinton	45%	John McCain	44%	900 RV	±3%
Fox News/Opinion Dynamics	April 28–29, 2008	Barack Obama	43%	John McCain	46%	900 RV	±3%
CBS News/New York Times	April 25–29, 2008	Hillary Clinton	48%	John McCain	43%	891 RV	Not reported
CBS News/New York Times	April 25–29, 2008	Barack Obama	45%	John McCain	45%	891 RV	Not reported
NBC News/Wall Street Journal	April 25–28, 2008	Hillary Clinton	45%	John McCain	44%	1,006 RV	±3.1%
NBC News/Wall Street Journal	April 25–28, 2008	Barack Obama	46%	John McCain	43%	1,006 RV	±3.1%
Pew Research Center	April 23–27, 2008	Hillary Clinton	49%	John McCain	45%	1,323 RV	Not reported
Pew Research Center	April 23–27, 2008	Barack Obama	50%	John McCain	44%	1,323 RV	Not reported
Associated Press/Ipsos	April 23–27, 2008	Hillary Clinton	50%	John McCain	41%	760 RV	±3.6%
Associated Press/Ipsos	April 23–27, 2008	Barack Obama	46%	John McCain	44%	760 RV	±3.6%
Rasmussen Reports/Pulse Opinion Research (Daily Tracking)	April 23–26, 2008	Hillary Clinton	45%	John McCain	47%	1,600 LV	±3%
Rasmussen Reports/Pulse Opinion Research (Daily Tracking)	April 23–26, 2008	Barack Obama	46%	John McCain	46%	1,600 LV	±3%
Newsweek/Princeton Survey Research Associates International	April 24–25, 2008	Hillary Clinton; Barack Obama	48% 47%	John McCain; John McCain	45% 44%	1,203 RV	±3%
Gallup (Daily Tracking)	April 21–25, 2008	Hillary Clinton	47%	John McCain	44%	4,397 RV	±2%
Gallup (Daily Tracking)	April 21–25, 2008	Barack Obama	45%	John McCain	45%	4,397 RV	±2%
The Economist/Polimetrix/YouGov	April 21–22, 2008	Hillary Clinton	43%	John McCain	44%	993 A	±4%
The Economist/Polimetrix/YouGov	April 21–22, 2008	Barack Obama	42%	John McCain	45%	995 A	±4%
Rasmussen Reports/Pulse Opinion Research (Daily Tracking)	April 19–22, 2008	Hillary Clinton	44%	John McCain	47%	1,600 LV	±3%
Rasmussen Reports/Pulse Opinion Research (Daily Tracking)	April 19–22, 2008	Barack Obama	44%	John McCain	47%	1,600 LV	±3%
USA Today/Gallup	April 18–20, 2008	Hillary Clinton	49%	John McCain	45%	832 LV	±4%
USA Today/Gallup	April 18–20, 2008	Barack Obama	49%	John McCain	44%	832 LV	±4%
Cook Political Report/RT Strategies	April 17–20, 2008	Hillary Clinton	45%	John McCain	46%	802 RV	±3.5%
Cook Political Report/RT Strategies	April 17–20, 2008	Barack Obama	44%	John McCain	45%	802 RV	±3.5%
Rasmussen Reports/Pulse Opinion Research (Daily Tracking)	April 15–18, 2008	Hillary Clinton	42%	John McCain	49%	1,600 LV	±3%
Rasmussen Reports/Pulse Opinion Research (Daily Tracking)	April 15–18, 2008	Barack Obama	41%	John McCain	48%	1,600 LV	±3%
Gallup (Daily Tracking)	April 14–18, 2008	Hillary Clinton	46%	John McCain	44%	4,392 RV	±2%
Gallup (Daily Tracking)	April 14–18, 2008	Barack Obama	45%	John McCain	44%	4,392 RV	±2%
Newsweek/Princeton Survey Research Associates International	April 16–17, 2008	Hillary Clinton	47%	John McCain	43%	1,209 RV	±3%
Newsweek/Princeton Survey Research Associates International	April 16–17, 2008	Barack Obama	48%	John McCain	44%	1,209 RV	±3%
Democracy Corps/Greenberg Quinlan Rosner (D)	April 15–17, 2008	Hillary Clinton	47%	John McCain	49%	1,000 LV	Not reported
Democracy Corps/Greenberg Quinlan Rosner (D)	April 15–17, 2008	Barack Obama	48%	John McCain	47%	1,000 LV	Not reported
The Economist/Polimetrix/YouGov	April 15–16, 2008	Hillary Clinton	40%	John McCain	45%	997 A	±4%
The Economist/Polimetrix/YouGov	April 15–16, 2008	Barack Obama	42%	John McCain	45%	995 A	±4%
Rasmussen Reports/Pulse Opinion Research (Daily Tracking)	April 11–14, 2008	Hillary Clinton	41%	John McCain	48%	1,600 LV	±3%
Rasmussen Reports/Pulse Opinion Research (Daily Tracking)	April 11–14, 2008	Barack Obama	43%	John McCain	47%	1,600 LV	±3%
ABC News/Washington Post	April 10–13, 2008	Hillary Clinton	45%	John McCain	48%	Not reported	Not reported
ABC News/Washington Post	April 10–13, 2008	Barack Obama	49%	John McCain	44%	Not reported	Not reported
Gallup (Daily Tracking)	April 9–13, 2008	Hillary Clinton	46%	John McCain	45%	4,415 RV	±2%
Gallup (Daily Tracking)	April 9–13, 2008	Barack Obama	46%	John McCain	44%	4,415 RV	±2%
Harris Interactive	April 11–12, 2008	Hillary Clinton	39%	John McCain	38%	Not reported	Not reported
Harris Interactive	April 11–12, 2008	Barack Obama	41%	John McCain	36%	Not reported	Not reported
Reuters/Zogby International	April 10–12, 2008	Hillary Clinton	41%	John McCain	46%	1,046 LV	±3.1%
Reuters/Zogby International	April 10–12, 2008	Barack Obama	45%	John McCain	45%	1,046 LV	±3.1%
Rasmussen Reports/Pulse Opinion Research (Daily Tracking)	April 7–10, 2008	Hillary Clinton	42%	John McCain	48%	1,600 LV	±3%
Rasmussen Reports/Pulse Opinion Research (Daily Tracking)	April 7–10, 2008	Barack Obama	44%	John McCain	47%	1,600 LV	±3%
Associated Press/Ipsos	April 7–9, 2008	Hillary Clinton	48%	John McCain	45%	749 RV	±3.6%
Associated Press/Ipsos	April 7–9, 2008	Barack Obama	45%	John McCain	45%	749 RV	±3.6%
Gallup (Daily Tracking)	April 4–8, 2008	Hillary Clinton	46%	John McCain	46%	4,366 RV	±2%
Gallup (Daily Tracking)	April 4–8, 2008	Barack Obama	46%	John McCain	44%	4,366 RV	±2%
The Economist/Polimetrix/YouGov	April 4–7, 2008	Hillary Clinton	43%	John McCain	44%	994 A	±4%
The Economist/Polimetrix/YouGov	April 4–7, 2008	Barack Obama	43%	John McCain	44%	994 A	±4%
Rasmussen Reports/Pulse Opinion Research (Daily Tracking)	April 3−6, 2008	Hillary Clinton	44%	John McCain	47%	1,600 LV	±3%
Rasmussen Reports/Pulse Opinion Research (Daily Tracking)	April 3−6, 2008	Barack Obama	45%	John McCain	46%	1,600 LV	±3%
Investor's Business Daily/TIPP	April 1–6, 2008	Hillary Clinton	38%	John McCain	45%	916 RV	Not reported
Investor's Business Daily/TIPP	April 1–6, 2008	Barack Obama	44%	John McCain	44%	916 RV	Not reported
Gallup (Daily Tracking)	March 31–April 3, 2008	Hillary Clinton	45%	John McCain	46%	4,433 RV	±2%
Gallup (Daily Tracking)	March 31–April 3, 2008	Barack Obama	45%	John McCain	46%	4,433 RV	±2%
Rasmussen Reports/Pulse Opinion Research (Daily Tracking)	March 30–April 2, 2008	Hillary Clinton	42%	John McCain	47%	1,600 LV	±3%
Rasmussen Reports/Pulse Opinion Research (Daily Tracking)	March 30–April 2, 2008	Barack Obama	41%	John McCain	48%	1,600 LV	±3%
CBS News/New York Times	March 28 – April 2, 2008	Hillary Clinton	48%	John McCain	43%	1,196 RV	Not reported
CBS News/New York Times	March 28 – April 2, 2008	Barack Obama	47%	John McCain	42%	1,196 RV	Not reported
Diageo/The Hotline/Financial Dynamics	March 28–31, 2008	Hillary Clinton	41%	John McCain	50%	799 RV	±3.5%
Diageo/The Hotline/Financial Dynamics	March 28–31, 2008	Barack Obama	44%	John McCain	46%	799 RV	±3.5%
Gallup (Daily Tracking)	March 26–30, 2008	Hillary Clinton	45%	John McCain	47%	4,394 RV	±2%
Gallup (Daily Tracking)	March 26–30, 2008	Barack Obama	45%	John McCain	46%	4,394 RV	±2%
Rasmussen Reports/Pulse Opinion Research (Daily Tracking)	March 26–29, 2008	Hillary Clinton	40%	John McCain	50%	1,600 LV	±3%
Rasmussen Reports/Pulse Opinion Research (Daily Tracking)	March 26–29, 2008	Barack Obama	44%	John McCain	47%	1,600 LV	±3%
Republican National Committee/Voter/Voter/Consumer Research (R)	March 25–27, 2008	Hillary Clinton	40%	John McCain	51%	800 RV	Not reported
Republican National Committee/Voter/Voter/Consumer Research (R)	March 25–27, 2008	Barack Obama	42%	John McCain	48%	800 RV	Not reported
Democracy Corps/Greenberg Quinlan Rosner (D)	March 25–27, 2008	Hillary Clinton	43%	John McCain	52%	500 LV	Not reported
Democracy Corps/Greenberg Quinlan Rosner (D)	March 25–27, 2008	Barack Obama	49%	John McCain	46%	500 LV	Not reported
NBC News/Wall Street Journal	March 24–25, 2008	Hillary Clinton	44%	John McCain	46%	800 RV	±3.5%
NBC News/Wall Street Journal	March 24–25, 2008	Barack Obama	44%	John McCain	42%	800 RV	±3.5%
Rasmussen Reports/Pulse Opinion Research (Daily Tracking)	March 22–25, 2008	Hillary Clinton	43%	John McCain	50%	1,600 LV	±3%
Rasmussen Reports/Pulse Opinion Research (Daily Tracking)	March 22–25, 2008	Barack Obama	41%	John McCain	51%	1,600 LV	±3%
Gallup (Daily Tracking)	March 21–22, 24–25, 2008	Hillary Clinton	45%	John McCain	47%	4,433 RV	±2%
Gallup (Daily Tracking)	March 21–22, 24–25, 2008	Barack Obama	44%	John McCain	46%	4,433 RV	±2%
The Economist/Polimetrix/YouGov	March 21–24, 2008	Hillary Clinton	39%	John McCain	48%	995 A	±4%
The Economist/Polimetrix/YouGov	March 21–24, 2008	Barack Obama	41%	John McCain	45%	992 A	±4%
Harris Interactive	March 14–24, 2008	Hillary Clinton	39%	John McCain	35%	Not reported	Not reported
Harris Interactive	March 14–24, 2008	Barack Obama	40%	John McCain	35%	Not reported	Not reported
Pew Research Center	March 19–22, 2008	Hillary Clinton	49%	John McCain	44%	1,248 RV	±3.5%
Pew Research Center	March 19–22, 2008	Barack Obama	49%	John McCain	43%	1,248 RV	±3.5%
Rasmussen Reports/Pulse Opinion Research (Daily Tracking)	March 18–21, 2008	Hillary Clinton	43%	John McCain	49%	1,600 LV	±3%
Rasmussen Reports/Pulse Opinion Research (Daily Tracking)	March 18–21, 2008	Barack Obama	41%	John McCain	49%	1,600 LV	±3%
Gallup (Daily Tracking)	March 16–20, 2008	Hillary Clinton	45%	John McCain	48%	4,377 RV	±2%
Gallup (Daily Tracking)	March 16–20, 2008	Barack Obama	44%	John McCain	47%	4,377 RV	±2%
Fox News/Opinion Dynamics Corporation	March 18–19, 2008	Hillary Clinton	46%	John McCain	43%	900 RV	±3%
Fox News/Opinion Dynamics Corporation	March 18–19, 2008	Barack Obama	43%	John McCain	44%	900 RV	±3%
CBS News	March 15–18, 2008	Hillary Clinton	46%	John McCain	44%	Not reported	Not reported
CBS News	March 15–18, 2008	Barack Obama	44%	John McCain	46%	Not reported	Not reported
Rasmussen Reports/Pulse Opinion Research (Daily Tracking)	March 14–17, 2008	Hillary Clinton	42%	John McCain	48%	1,600 LV	±3%
Rasmussen Reports/Pulse Opinion Research (Daily Tracking)	March 14–17, 2008	Barack Obama	42%	John McCain	48%	1,600 LV	±3%
CNN/Opinion Research Corporation	March 14–16, 2008	Hillary Clinton	49%	John McCain	47%	950 RV	±3%
CNN/Opinion Research Corporation	March 14–16, 2008	Barack Obama	47%	John McCain	46%	950 RV	±3%
USA Today/Gallup	March 14–16, 2008	Hillary Clinton	51%	John McCain	46%	685 LV	±4%
USA Today/Gallup	March 14–16, 2008	Barack Obama	49%	John McCain	47%	685 LV	±4%
Reuters/Zogby International	March 13–14, 2008	Hillary Clinton	40%	John McCain	48%	1,004 LV	±3.2%
Reuters/Zogby International	March 13–14, 2008	Barack Obama	40%	John McCain	46%	1,004 LV	±3.2%
Rasmussen Reports/Pulse Opinion Research (Daily Tracking)	March 10–13, 2008	Hillary Clinton	44%	John McCain	46%	1,600 LV	±3%
Rasmussen Reports/Pulse Opinion Research (Daily Tracking)	March 10–13, 2008	Barack Obama	42%	John McCain	47%	1,600 LV	±3%
Gallup (Daily Tracking)	March 7–11, 2008	Hillary Clinton	47%	John McCain	45%	4,372 RV	±2%
Gallup (Daily Tracking)	March 7–11, 2008	Barack Obama	46%	John McCain	44%	4,372 RV	±2%
NBC News/Wall Street Journal	March 7–10, 2008	Hillary Clinton	47%	John McCain	45%	1,012 RV	±3.1%
NBC News/Wall Street Journal	March 7–10, 2008	Barack Obama	47%	John McCain	44%	1,012 RV	±3.1%
Rasmussen Reports/Pulse Opinion Research (Daily Tracking)	March 6–9, 2008	Hillary Clinton	46%	John McCain	45%	1,600 LV	±3%
Rasmussen Reports/Pulse Opinion Research (Daily Tracking)	March 6–9, 2008	Barack Obama	44%	John McCain	45%	1,600 LV	±3%
Rasmussen Reports/Pulse Opinion Research (Daily Tracking)	March 2–5, 2008	Hillary Clinton	45%	John McCain	46%	1,600 LV	±3%
Rasmussen Reports/Pulse Opinion Research (Daily Tracking)	March 2–5, 2008	Barack Obama	44%	John McCain	46%	1,600 LV	±3%
SurveyUSA	March 4, 2008	Hillary Clinton	48%	John McCain	46%	1,041 RV	Not reported
SurveyUSA	March 4, 2008	Barack Obama	46%	John McCain	46%	1,041 RV	Not reported
Cook Political Report/RT Strategies	February 28 – March 2, 2008	Barack Obama	47%	John McCain	38%	802 RV	±3.5%
ABC News/Washington Post	February 28 – March 2, 2008	Hillary Clinton	50%	John McCain	47%	Not reported	Not reported
ABC News/Washington Post	February 28 – March 2, 2008	Barack Obama	53%	John McCain	42%	Not reported	Not reported
Rasmussen Reports/Pulse Opinion Research (Daily Tracking)	February 27–March 1, 2008	Hillary Clinton	44%	John McCain	47%	1,600 LV	±3%
Rasmussen Reports/Pulse Opinion Research (Daily Tracking)	February 27–March 1, 2008	Barack Obama	43%	John McCain	48%	1,600 LV	±3%
Democracy Corps/Greenberg Quinlan Rosner (D)	February 24–26, 2008	Barack Obama	48%	John McCain	47%	1,956 LV	Not reported
Rasmussen Reports/Pulse Opinion Research (Daily Tracking)	February 23–26, 2008	Hillary Clinton	43%	John McCain	48%	1,600 LV	±3%
Rasmussen Reports/Pulse Opinion Research (Daily Tracking)	February 23–26, 2008	Barack Obama	43%	John McCain	46%	1,600 LV	±3%
Los Angeles Times/Bloomberg	February 21–25, 2008	Hillary Clinton	40%	John McCain	46%	1,246 RV	±3%
Los Angeles Times/Bloomberg	February 21–25, 2008	Barack Obama	42%	John McCain	44%	1,246 RV	±3%
Associated Press/Ipsos	February 22–24, 2008	Hillary Clinton	48%	John McCain	43%	755 RV	±3.6%
Associated Press/Ipsos	February 22–24, 2008	Barack Obama	51%	John McCain	41%	755 RV	±3.6%
USA Today/Gallup	February 21–24, 2008	Hillary Clinton	46%	John McCain	50%	1,653 LV	±3%
USA Today/Gallup	February 21–24, 2008	Barack Obama	47%	John McCain	48%	1,653 LV	±3%
Pew Research Center	February 20–24, 2008	Hillary Clinton	50%	John McCain	45%	1,240 RV	±3.5%
Pew Research Center	February 20–24, 2008	Barack Obama	50%	John McCain	43%	1,240 RV	±3.5%
CBS News/New York Times	February 20–24, 2008	Hillary Clinton	46%	John McCain	46%	1,115 RV	±3%
CBS News/New York Times	February 20–24, 2008	Barack Obama	50%	John McCain	38%	1,115 RV	±3%
Rasmussen Reports/Pulse Opinion Research (Daily Tracking)	February 19–22, 2008	Hillary Clinton	44%	John McCain	47%	1,600 LV	±3%
Rasmussen Reports/Pulse Opinion Research (Daily Tracking)	February 19–22, 2008	Barack Obama	43%	John McCain	46%	1,600 LV	±3%
Fox News/Opinion Dynamics Corporation	February 19–20, 2008	Hillary Clinton	44%	John McCain	47%	900 RV	±3%
Fox News/Opinion Dynamics Corporation	February 19–20, 2008	Barack Obama	47%	John McCain	43%	900 RV	±3%
Rasmussen Reports/Pulse Opinion Research (Daily Tracking)	February 15–18, 2008	Hillary Clinton	43%	John McCain	47%	1,600 LV	±3%
Rasmussen Reports/Pulse Opinion Research (Daily Tracking)	February 15–18, 2008	Barack Obama	46%	John McCain	43%	1,600 LV	±3%
Diageo/The Hotline/Financial Dynamics	February 14–17, 2008	Hillary Clinton	40%	John McCain	48%	803 RV	±3.5%
Diageo/The Hotline/Financial Dynamics	February 14–17, 2008	Barack Obama	48%	John McCain	40%	803 RV	±3.5%
Reuters/Zogby International	February 13–16, 2008	Hillary Clinton	38%	John McCain	50%	1,105 LV	±3%
Reuters/Zogby International	February 13–16, 2008	Barack Obama	47%	John McCain	40%	1,105 LV	±3%
Rasmussen Reports/Pulse Opinion Research (Daily Tracking)	February 11–14, 2008	Hillary Clinton	41%	John McCain	49%	1,600 LV	±3%
Rasmussen Reports/Pulse Opinion Research (Daily Tracking)	February 11–14, 2008	Barack Obama	46%	John McCain	43%	1,600 LV	±3%
USA Today/Gallup	February 8–10, 2008	Hillary Clinton	48%	John McCain	49%	706 LV	±4%
USA Today/Gallup	February 8–10, 2008	Barack Obama	50%	John McCain	46%	706 LV	±4%
Rasmussen Reports/Pulse Opinion Research (Daily Tracking)	February 7–10, 2008	Hillary Clinton	43%	John McCain	46%	1,600 LV	±3%
Rasmussen Reports/Pulse Opinion Research (Daily Tracking)	February 7–10, 2008	Barack Obama	44%	John McCain	40%	1,600 LV	±3%
Associated Press/Ipsos	February 7–10, 2008	Hillary Clinton	46%	John McCain	45%	790 RV	±3.5%
Associated Press/Ipsos	February 7–10, 2008	Barack Obama	48%	John McCain	42%	790 RV	±3.5%
Rasmussen Reports/Pulse Opinion Research (Daily Tracking)	February 3–6, 2008	Hillary Clinton	44%	John McCain	46%	1,600 LV	±3%
Rasmussen Reports/Pulse Opinion Research (Daily Tracking)	February 3–6, 2008	Barack Obama	46%	John McCain	43%	1,600 LV	±3%
Time/Schulman, Ronca, & Bucuvalas Inc. (SRBI)	February 1–4, 2008	Hillary Clinton	46%	John McCain	46%	958 LV	±3%
Time/Schulman, Ronca, & Bucuvalas Inc. (SRBI)	February 1–4, 2008	Barack Obama	48%	John McCain	41%	958 LV	±3%

Three-way race

Poll source	Date administered	Democrat	%	Republican	%	Independent	%	Sample size	Margin of error
Associated Press/Yahoo News/Knowledge Networks	April 2–14, 2008	Barack Obama	34%	John McCain	36%	Ralph Nader	3%	1,576 RV	±2.5%
Associated Press/Yahoo News/Knowledge Networks	April 2–14, 2008	Hillary Clinton	36%	John McCain	37%	Ralph Nader	3%	1,576 RV	±2.5%
Reuters/Zogby International	March 13–14, 2008	Barack Obama	39%	John McCain	44%	Ralph Nader	5%	1,004 LV	±3.2%
Reuters/Zogby International	March 13–14, 2008	Hillary Clinton	39%	John McCain	45%	Ralph Nader	6%	1,004 LV	±3.2%

Four-way race

Poll source	Date administered	Democrat	%	Republican	%	Independent	%	Libertarian	%	Sample size	Margin of error
Reuters/Zogby International	May 15–18, 2008	Barack Obama	47%	John McCain	37%	Ralph Nader	4%	Bob Barr	3%	1,076 LV	±3.0%
Reuters/Zogby International	May 15–18, 2008	Hillary Clinton	41%	John McCain	40%	Ralph Nader	4%	Bob Barr	3%	1,076 LV	±3.0%
Rasmussen Reports/Pulse Opinion Research	May 14–15, 2008	Barack Obama	42%	John McCain	38%	Ralph Nader	4%	Bob Barr	6%	800 LV	±3.5%
Zogby Interactive	April 25–28, 2008	Barack Obama	45%	John McCain	42%	Ralph Nader	1%	Bob Barr	3%	7,653 LV	±1.1%
Zogby Interactive	April 25–28, 2008	Hillary Clinton	34%	John McCain	44%	Ralph Nader	3%	Bob Barr	4%	7,653 LV	±1.1%
Reuters/Zogby International	April 10–12, 2008	Barack Obama	44%	John McCain	42%	Ralph Nader	3%	Bob Barr	2%	1,046 LV	±3.1%
Reuters/Zogby International	April 10–12, 2008	Hillary Clinton	39%	John McCain	45%	Ralph Nader	3%	Bob Barr	2%	1,046 LV	±3.1%

==== Democratic field vs. Republican field ====
Poll Source	Date administered	Democrat	%	Republican	%	Sample size	Margin of error
The Economist/Polimetrix/YouGov	February 25–26, 2008	Hillary Clinton	44%	Mike Huckabee	45%	994 A	±4%
The Economist/Polimetrix/YouGov	February 25–26, 2008	Hillary Clinton	40%	John McCain	46%	991 A	±4%
The Economist/Polimetrix/YouGov	February 25–26, 2008	Barack Obama	47%	Mike Huckabee	41%	988 A	±4%
The Economist/Polimetrix/YouGov	February 25–26, 2008	Barack Obama	43%	John McCain	44%	993 A	±4%
The Economist/Polimetrix/YouGov	February 19–20, 2008	Hillary Clinton	46%	Mike Huckabee	40%	999 A	±4%
The Economist/Polimetrix/YouGov	February 19–20, 2008	Hillary Clinton	43%	John McCain	44%	996 A	±4%
The Economist/Polimetrix/YouGov	February 19–20, 2008	Barack Obama	49%	Mike Huckabee	45%	997 A	±4%
The Economist/Polimetrix/YouGov	February 19–20, 2008	Barack Obama	45%	John McCain	41%	1,000 A	±4%
The Economist/Polimetrix/YouGov	February 10–11, 2008	Hillary Clinton	48%	Mike Huckabee	41%	999 A	±4%
The Economist/Polimetrix/YouGov	February 10–11, 2008	Hillary Clinton	43%	John McCain	44%	998 A	±4%
The Economist/Polimetrix/YouGov	February 10–11, 2008	Barack Obama	51%	Mike Huckabee	37%	998 A	±4%
The Economist/Polimetrix/YouGov	February 10–11, 2008	Barack Obama	49%	John McCain	39%	996 A	±4%
Zogby International	February 8−11, 2008	Hillary Clinton	37%	John McCain	42%	7,468 LV	±1.2%
Zogby International	February 8−11, 2008	Barack Obama	47%	John McCain	36%	7,468 LV	±1.2%
Zogby International	February 8−11, 2008	Hillary Clinton	40%	Mike Huckabee	37%	7,468 LV	±1.2%
Zogby International	February 8−11, 2008	Barack Obama	49%	Mike Huckabee	34%	7,468 LV	±1.2%
The Economist/Polimetrix/YouGov	February 4–5, 2008	Hillary Clinton	51%	Mitt Romney	36%	998 A	±4%
The Economist/Polimetrix/YouGov	February 4–5, 2008	Hillary Clinton	46%	John McCain	39%	994 A	±4%
The Economist/Polimetrix/YouGov	February 4–5, 2008	Barack Obama	49%	Mitt Romney	35%	997 A	±4%
The Economist/Polimetrix/YouGov	February 4–5, 2008	Barack Obama	44%	John McCain	38%	993 A	±4%
CNN/Opinion Research Corporation	February 1−3, 2008	Barack Obama	59%	Mitt Romney	36%	974 RV	±3%
CNN/Opinion Research Corporation	February 1−3, 2008	Hillary Clinton	56%	Mitt Romney	41%	974 RV	±3%
CNN/Opinion Research Corporation	February 1−3, 2008	Barack Obama	52%	John McCain	44%	974 RV	±3%
CNN/Opinion Research Corporation	February 1−3, 2008	Hillary Clinton	50%	John McCain	47%	974 RV	±3%
Rasmussen Reports/Pulse Opinion Research (Daily Tracking)	January 31 − February 3, 2008	Hillary Clinton	39%	John McCain	47%	1,600 LV	±3%
Rasmussen Reports/Pulse Opinion Research (Daily Tracking)	January 31 − February 3, 2008	Hillary Clinton	50%	Mitt Romney	37%	1,600 LV	±3%
Rasmussen Reports/Pulse Opinion Research (Daily Tracking)	January 31 − February 3, 2008	Barack Obama	44%	John McCain	44%	1,600 LV	±3%
Rasmussen Reports/Pulse Opinion Research (Daily Tracking)	January 31 − February 3, 2008	Barack Obama	44%	Mitt Romney	41%	1,600 LV	±3%
Cook Political Report/RT Strategies	January 31 – February 2, 2008	Hillary Clinton	41%	John McCain	45%	855 RV	±3.4%
Cook Political Report/RT Strategies	January 31 – February 2, 2008	Hillary Clinton	48%	Mitt Romney	42%	855 RV	±3.4%
Cook Political Report/RT Strategies	January 31 – February 2, 2008	Barack Obama	45%	John McCain	43%	855 RV	±3.4%
Cook Political Report/RT Strategies	January 31 – February 2, 2008	Barack Obama	50%	Mitt Romney	41%	855 RV	±3.4%
ABC News/Washington Post	January 30 – February 1, 2008	Hillary Clinton	45%	John McCain	50%	Not reported	Not reported
ABC News/Washington Post	January 30 – February 1, 2008	Hillary Clinton	51%	Mitt Romney	43%	Not reported	Not reported
ABC News/Washington Post	January 30 – February 1, 2008	Barack Obama	47%	John McCain	48%	Not reported	Not reported
ABC News/Washington Post	January 30 – February 1, 2008	Barack Obama	57%	Mitt Romney	36%	Not reported	Not reported
Fox News/Opinion Dynamics Corporation	January 30–31, 2008	Hillary Clinton	44%	John McCain	45%	900 RV	±3%
Fox News/Opinion Dynamics Corporation	January 30–31, 2008	Hillary Clinton	50%	Mitt Romney	36%	900 RV	±3%
Fox News/Opinion Dynamics Corporation	January 30–31, 2008	Barack Obama	44%	John McCain	43%	900 RV	±3%
Fox News/Opinion Dynamics Corporation	January 30–31, 2008	Barack Obama	51%	Mitt Romney	33%	900 RV	±3%
Democracy Corps/Greenberg Quinlan Rosner (D)	January 29–31, 2008	Hillary Clinton	46%	John McCain	48%	500 LV	Not reported
Democracy Corps/Greenberg Quinlan Rosner (D)	January 29–31, 2008	Barack Obama	47%	John McCain	48%	500 LV	Not reported
NPR/Public Opinion Research/Greenberg Quinlan Rosner	January 29–31, 2008	Hillary Clinton	45%	John McCain	48%	1,000 LV	±3%
NPR/Public Opinion Research/Greenberg Quinlan Rosner	January 29–31, 2008	Hillary Clinton	49%	Mitt Romney	44%	1,000 LV	±3%
NPR/Public Opinion Research/Greenberg Quinlan Rosner	January 29–31, 2008	Barack Obama	47%	John McCain	48%	1,000 LV	±3%
NPR/Public Opinion Research/Greenberg Quinlan Rosner	January 29–31, 2008	Barack Obama	53%	Mitt Romney	41%	1,000 LV	±3%
Rasmussen Reports/Pulse Opinion Research	January 25–27, 2008	Hillary Clinton	40%	John McCain	48%	1,200 LV	±3%
Rasmussen Reports/Pulse Opinion Research	January 25–27, 2008	Barack Obama	41%	John McCain	47%	1,200 LV	±3%
Rasmussen Reports/Pulse Opinion Research	January 21–22, 2008	Barack Obama	47%	Mitt Romney	38%	800 LV	±4%
Rasmussen Reports/Pulse Opinion Research	January 21–22, 2008	Hillary Clinton	47%	Mitt Romney	42%	800 LV	±4%
NBC News/Wall Street Journal	January 20–22, 2008	Barack Obama	41%	John McCain	43%	Not reported	Not reported
NBC News/Wall Street Journal	January 20–22, 2008	Barack Obama	48%	Mitt Romney	35%	Not reported	Not reported
NBC News/Wall Street Journal	January 20–22, 2008	Barack Obama	54%	Rudy Giuliani	34%	Not reported	Not reported
NBC News/Wall Street Journal	January 20–22, 2008	Barack Obama	55%	Mike Huckabee	33%	Not reported	Not reported
NBC News/Wall Street Journal	January 20–22, 2008	Hillary Clinton	43%	John McCain	47%	Not reported	Not reported
NBC News/Wall Street Journal	January 20–22, 2008	Hillary Clinton	50%	Mike Huckabee	41%	Not reported	Not reported
NBC News/Wall Street Journal	January 20–22, 2008	Hillary Clinton	52%	Rudy Giuliani	37%	Not reported	Not reported
NBC News/Wall Street Journal	January 20–22, 2008	Hillary Clinton	52%	Mitt Romney	36%	Not reported	Not reported
Los Angeles Times/Bloomberg	January 18–22, 2008	Barack Obama	47%	Mike Huckabee	37%	643 RV	±4%
Los Angeles Times/Bloomberg	January 18–22, 2008	Barack Obama	41%	John McCain	42%	643 RV	±4%
Los Angeles Times/Bloomberg	January 18–22, 2008	Barack Obama	49%	Rudy Giuliani	32%	643 RV	±4%
Los Angeles Times/Bloomberg	January 18–22, 2008	Barack Obama	46%	Mitt Romney	35%	643 RV	±4%
Los Angeles Times/Bloomberg	January 18–22, 2008	Hillary Clinton	51%	Mike Huckabee	38%	669 RV	±4%
Los Angeles Times/Bloomberg	January 18–22, 2008	Hillary Clinton	53%	Rudy Giuliani	37%	669 RV	±4%
Los Angeles Times/Bloomberg	January 18–22, 2008	Hillary Clinton	46%	John McCain	42%	669 RV	±4%
Los Angeles Times/Bloomberg	January 18–22, 2008	Hillary Clinton	50%	Mitt Romney	39%	669 RV	±4%
Rasmussen Reports/Pulse Opinion Research	January 18–20, 2008	Barack Obama	51%	Mike Huckabee	35%	800 LV	±3.5%
Rasmussen Reports/Pulse Opinion Research	January 18–20, 2008	Hillary Clinton	48%	Mike Huckabee	40%	800 LV	±3.5%
Rasmussen Reports/Pulse Opinion Research	January 16–17, 2008	Barack Obama	46%	John McCain	41%	800 LV	±4.5%
Rasmussen Reports/Pulse Opinion Research	January 16–17, 2008	Hillary Clinton	47%	John McCain	45%	800 LV	±4.5%
USA Today/Gallup	January 10–13, 2008	Barack Obama	53%	Mike Huckabee	43%	1,598 LV	±3%
USA Today/Gallup	January 10–13, 2008	Barack Obama	45%	John McCain	50%	1,598 LV	±3%
USA Today/Gallup	January 10–13, 2008	Hillary Clinton	47%	John McCain	50%	1,598 LV	±3%
USA Today/Gallup	January 10–13, 2008	Hillary Clinton	51%	Mike Huckabee	45%	1,598 LV	±3%
Diageo/The Hotline/Financial Dynamics	January 10–12, 2008	Barack Obama	41%	John McCain	39%	803 RV	±3.5%
Diageo/The Hotline/Financial Dynamics	January 10–12, 2008	Hillary Clinton	43%	John McCain	47%	803 RV	±3.5%
Diageo/The Hotline/Financial Dynamics	January 10–12, 2008	Barack Obama	53%	Mike Huckabee	30%	803 RV	±3.5%
Diageo/The Hotline/Financial Dynamics	January 10–12, 2008	Hillary Clinton	48%	Mike Huckabee	39%	803 RV	±3.5%
Diageo/The Hotline/Financial Dynamics	January 10–12, 2008	Barack Obama	56%	Mitt Romney	26%	803 RV	±3.5%
Diageo/The Hotline/Financial Dynamics	January 10–12, 2008	Hillary Clinton	49%	Mitt Romney	37%	803 RV	±3.5%
Diageo/The Hotline/Financial Dynamics	January 10–12, 2008	Barack Obama	54%	Rudy Giuliani	33%	803 RV	±3.5%
Diageo/The Hotline/Financial Dynamics	January 10–12, 2008	Hillary Clinton	50%	Rudy Giuliani	40%	803 RV	±3.5%
Diageo/The Hotline/Financial Dynamics	January 10–12, 2008	John Edwards	48%	Rudy Giuliani	31%	803 RV	±3.5%
Diageo/The Hotline/Financial Dynamics	January 10–12, 2008	John Edwards	39%	John McCain	47%	803 RV	±3.5%
Diageo/The Hotline/Financial Dynamics	January 10–12, 2008	John Edwards	47%	Mike Huckabee	31%	803 RV	±3.5%
Diageo/The Hotline/Financial Dynamics	January 10–12, 2008	John Edwards	48%	Mitt Romney	33%	803 RV	±3.5%
Reuters/Zogby International	January 10–11, 2008	Hillary Clinton	47%	Mitt Romney	37%	1,006 LV	±3.1%
Reuters/Zogby International	January 10–11, 2008	Hillary Clinton	47%	Mike Huckabee	38%	1,006 LV	±3.1%
Reuters/Zogby International	January 10–11, 2008	Hillary Clinton	46%	Rudy Giuliani	35%	1,006 LV	±3.1%
Reuters/Zogby International	January 10–11, 2008	Barack Obama	53%	Mitt Romney	34%	1,006 LV	±3.1%
Reuters/Zogby International	January 10–11, 2008	Barack Obama	51%	Mike Huckabee	36%	1,006 LV	±3.1%
Reuters/Zogby International	January 10–11, 2008	Barack Obama	51%	Rudy Giuliani	34%	1,006 LV	±3.1%
Rasmussen Reports/Pulse Opinion Research	January 9–10, 2008	Hillary Clinton	38%	John McCain	49%	800 LV	±4.5%
Rasmussen Reports/Pulse Opinion Research	January 9–10, 2008	Hillary Clinton	42%	Mike Huckabee	45%	800 LV	±4.5%
CNN/Opinion Research Corporation	January 9–10, 2008	Hillary Clinton	50%	John McCain	48%	840 RV	±3.5%
CNN/Opinion Research Corporation	January 9–10, 2008	Hillary Clinton	55%	Rudy Giuliani	42%	840 RV	±3.5%
CNN/Opinion Research Corporation	January 9–10, 2008	Hillary Clinton	56%	Mike Huckabee	42%	840 RV	±3.5%
CNN/Opinion Research Corporation	January 9–10, 2008	Hillary Clinton	58%	Mitt Romney	40%	840 RV	±3.5%
CNN/Opinion Research Corporation	January 9–10, 2008	Barack Obama	49%	John McCain	48%	840 RV	±3.5%
CNN/Opinion Research Corporation	January 9–10, 2008	Barack Obama	56%	Rudy Giuliani	40%	840 RV	±3.5%
CNN/Opinion Research Corporation	January 9–10, 2008	Barack Obama	58%	Mike Huckabee	39%	840 RV	±3.5%
CNN/Opinion Research Corporation	January 9–10, 2008	Barack Obama	59%	Mitt Romney	37%	840 RV	±3.5%
Rasmussen Reports/Pulse Opinion Research	Jan 7−8, 2008	Barack Obama	47%	Mitt Romney	40%	800 LV	±3.5%
Rasmussen Reports/Pulse Opinion Research	Jan 7−8, 2008	Barack Obama	48%	Rudy Giuliani	38%	800 LV	±3.5%
Rasmussen Reports/Pulse Opinion Research	Jan 4–6, 2008	Barack Obama	43%	John McCain	46%	800 LV	±4.5%
Rasmussen Reports/Pulse Opinion Research	Jan 4–6, 2008	Barack Obama	45%	Mike Huckabee	43%	800 LV	±4.5%
Rasmussen Reports/Pulse Opinion Research	Jan 2–3, 2008	Barack Obama	45%	Mitt Romney	39%	800 LV	±3.5%
Rasmussen Reports/Pulse Opinion Research	Jan 2–3, 2008	Barack Obama	47%	Rudy Giuliani	37%	800 LV	±3.5%
Fox News/Opinion Dynamics Corporation	Dec 18–19, 2007	Barack Obama	40%	John McCain	44%	900 RV	±3%
Fox News/Opinion Dynamics Corporation	Dec 18–19, 2007	Barack Obama	44%	Mike Huckabee	35%	900 RV	±3%
Fox News/Opinion Dynamics Corporation	Dec 18–19, 2007	Hillary Clinton	42%	John McCain	47%	900 RV	±3%
Fox News/Opinion Dynamics Corporation	Dec 18–19, 2007	Hillary Clinton	47%	Mike Huckabee	38%	900 RV	±3%
ABC News/Facebook	Dec 16–19, 2007	Hillary Clinton	45%	Rudy Giuliani	47%	1,142 A	±3%
ABC News/Facebook	Dec 16–19, 2007	Hillary Clinton	50%	Mike Huckabee	42%	1,142 A	±3%
ABC News/Facebook	Dec 16–19, 2007	Barack Obama	48%	Rudy Giuliani	41%	1,142 A	±3%
ABC News/Facebook	Dec 16–19, 2007	Barack Obama	52%	Mike Huckabee	35%	1,142 A	±3%
Rasmussen Reports/Pulse Opinion Research	Dec 17–18, 2007	Hillary Clinton	44%	Rudy Giuliani	45%	800 LV	±4.5%
Rasmussen Reports/Pulse Opinion Research	Dec 17–18, 2007	Hillary Clinton	43%	Mitt Romney	44%	800 LV	±4.5%
Rasmussen Reports/Pulse Opinion Research	Not reported (Dec 15-16?)	Barack Obama	43%	John McCain	45%	Not reported	Not reported
Rasmussen Reports/Pulse Opinion Research	Not reported (Dec 15-16?)	Barack Obama	47%	Fred Thompson	40%	Not reported	Not reported
NBC News/Wall Street Journal	Dec 14–17, 2007	Barack Obama	49%	Rudy Giuliani	40%	Not reported	Not reported
NBC News/Wall Street Journal	Dec 14–17, 2007	Hillary Clinton	46%	Mike Huckabee	44%	Not reported	Not reported
NBC News/Wall Street Journal	Dec 14–17, 2007	Barack Obama	48%	Mike Huckabee	36%	Not reported	Not reported
NBC News/Wall Street Journal	Dec 14–17, 2007	Hillary Clinton	46%	Rudy Giuliani	43%	1,005 A	±3.1%
NBC News/Wall Street Journal	Dec 14–17, 2007	Hillary Clinton	48%	Mitt Romney	41%	1,005 A	±3.1%
USA Today/Gallup	Dec 14–16, 2007	Barack Obama	51%	Rudy Giuliani	45%	906 RV	±4%
USA Today/Gallup	Dec 14–16, 2007	Barack Obama	53%	Mike Huckabee	42%	906 RV	±4%
USA Today/Gallup	Dec 14–16, 2007	Barack Obama	57%	Mitt Romney	39%	906 RV	±4%
USA Today/Gallup	Dec 14–16, 2007	Hillary Clinton	49%	Rudy Giuliani	48%	906 RV	±4%
USA Today/Gallup	Dec 14–16, 2007	Hillary Clinton	52%	Mitt Romney	46%	906 RV	±4%
USA Today/Gallup	Dec 14–16, 2007	Hillary Clinton	53%	Mike Huckabee	44%	906 RV	±4%
Zogby International	Dec 12–14, 2007	Barack Obama	53%	Mitt Romney	35%	1,000 LV	±3.2%
Zogby International	Dec 12–14, 2007	Barack Obama	47%	Mike Huckabee	42%	1,000 LV	±3.2%
Zogby International	Dec 12–14, 2007	Barack Obama	48%	Rudy Giuliani	39%	1,000 LV	±3.2%
Zogby International	Dec 12–14, 2007	Barack Obama	47%	John McCain	43%	1,000 LV	±3.2%
Zogby International	Dec 12–14, 2007	Barack Obama	52%	Fred Thompson	36%	1,000 LV	±3.2%
Zogby International	Dec 12–14, 2007	Hillary Clinton	46%	Mitt Romney	44%	1,000 LV	±3.2%
Zogby International	Dec 12–14, 2007	Hillary Clinton	43%	Mike Huckabee	48%	1,000 LV	±3.2%
Zogby International	Dec 12–14, 2007	Hillary Clinton	42%	Rudy Giuliani	46%	1,000 LV	±3.2%
Zogby International	Dec 12–14, 2007	Hillary Clinton	42%	John McCain	49%	1,000 LV	±3.2%
Zogby International	Dec 12–14, 2007	Hillary Clinton	48%	Fred Thompson	42%	1,000 LV	±3.2%
Zogby International	Dec 12–14, 2007	John Edwards	50%	Mitt Romney	38%	1,000 LV	±3.2%
Zogby International	Dec 12–14, 2007	John Edwards	47%	Mike Huckabee	41%	1,000 LV	±3.2%
Zogby International	Dec 12–14, 2007	John Edwards	44%	Rudy Giuliani	45%	1,000 LV	±3.2%
Zogby International	Dec 12–14, 2007	John Edwards	42%	John McCain	46%	1,000 LV	±3.2%
Zogby International	Dec 12–14, 2007	John Edwards	51%	Fred Thomson	35%	1,000 LV	±3.2%
Rasmussen Reports/Pulse Opinion Research	Dec 12–13, 2007	John Edwards	46%	John McCain	39%	800 LV	±3.5%
Rasmussen Reports/Pulse Opinion Research	Dec 12–13, 2007	John Edwards	49%	Mike Huckabee	37%	800 LV	±3.5%
George Washington University/Tarrance Group/Lake Research Group	Dec 9–12, 2007	Hillary Clinton	50%	Rudy Giuliani	44%	1,000 LV	±3.1%
George Washington University/Tarrance Group/Lake Research Group	Dec 9–12, 2007	Hillary Clinton	50%	Mitt Romney	44%	1,000 LV	±3.1%
George Washington University/Tarrance Group/Lake Research Group	Dec 9–12, 2007	Barack Obama	46%	Rudy Giuliani	43%	1,000 LV	±3.1%
George Washington University/Tarrance Group/Lake Research Group	Dec 9–12, 2007	Barack Obama	48%	Mitt Romney	42%	1,000 LV	±3.1%
Rasmussen Reports/Pulse Opinion Research	Dec 10–11, 2007	Barack Obama	43%	Rudy Giuliani	43%	800 LV	±3.5%
Rasmussen Reports/Pulse Opinion Research	Dec 10–11, 2007	Barack Obama	45%	Mitt Romney	41%	800 LV	±3.5%
Rasmussen Reports/Pulse Opinion Research	Dec 7–9, 2007	Barack Obama	50%	Ron Paul	31%	1,200 LV	±3%
Rasmussen Reports/Pulse Opinion Research	Dec 7–9, 2007	Hillary Clinton	49%	Ron Paul	37%	1,200 LV	±3%
CNN/Opinion Research Corporation	Dec 6–9, 2007	John Edwards	52%	John McCain	44%	912 RV	±3%
CNN/Opinion Research Corporation	Dec 6–9, 2007	John Edwards	53%	Rudy Giuliani	44%	912 RV	±3%
CNN/Opinion Research Corporation	Dec 6–9, 2007	John Edwards	59%	Mitt Romney	37%	912 RV	±3%
CNN/Opinion Research Corporation	Dec 6–9, 2007	John Edwards	60%	Mike Huckabee	35%	912 RV	±3%
CNN/Opinion Research Corporation	Dec 6–9, 2007	Barack Obama	48%	John McCain	48%	912 RV	±3%
CNN/Opinion Research Corporation	Dec 6–9, 2007	Barack Obama	52%	Rudy Giualiani	45%	912 RV	±3%
CNN/Opinion Research Corporation	Dec 6–9, 2007	Barack Obama	54%	Mitt Romney	41%	912 RV	±3%
CNN/Opinion Research Corporation	Dec 6–9, 2007	Barack Obama	55%	Mike Huckabee	40%	912 RV	±3%
CNN/Opinion Research Corporation	Dec 6–9, 2007	Hillary Clinton	48%	John McCain	50%	912 RV	±3%
CNN/Opinion Research Corporation	Dec 6–9, 2007	Hillary Clinton	51%	Rudy Giuliani	45%	912 RV	±3%
CNN/Opinion Research Corporation	Dec 6–9, 2007	Hillary Clinton	54%	Mike Huckabee	44%	912 RV	±3%
CNN/Opinion Research Corporation	Dec 6–9, 2007	Hillary Clinton	54%	Mitt Romney	43%	912 RV	±3%
Rasmussen Reports/Pulse Opinion Research	Dec 5–6, 2007	John Edwards	44%	Rudy Giuliani	44%	800 LV	±4.5%
Rasmussen Reports/Pulse Opinion Research	Dec 5–6, 2007	John Edwards	44%	Mike Huckabee	40%	800 LV	±4.5%
Rasmussen Reports/Pulse Opinion Research	Dec 3–4, 2007	Hillary Clinton	46%	Rudy Giuliani	43%	800 LV	±4.5%
Rasmussen Reports/Pulse Opinion Research	Dec 3–4, 2007	Hillary Clinton	46%	Mitt Romney	43%	800 LV	±4.5%
Los Angeles Times/Bloomberg	Nov 30 – Dec 3, 2007	Barack Obama	44%	Rudy Giuliani	39%	1,245 RV	±3%
Los Angeles Times/Bloomberg	Nov 30 – Dec 3, 2007	Barack Obama	45%	Mitt Romney	33%	1,245 RV	±3%
Los Angeles Times/Bloomberg	Nov 30 – Dec 3, 2007	Hillary Clinton	46%	Rudy Giuliani	42%	1,245 RV	±3%
Los Angeles Times/Bloomberg	Nov 30 – Dec 3, 2007	Hillary Clinton	47%	Mitt Romney	39%	1,245 RV	±3%
Rasmussen Reports/Pulse Opinion Research	Nov 30 – Dec 2, 2007	Barack Obama	45%	Mike Huckabee	41%	1,200 LV	±3%
Rasmussen Reports/Pulse Opinion Research	Nov 30 – Dec 2, 2007	Hillary Clinton	46%	Mike Huckabee	45%	1,200 LV	±3%
Rasmussen Reports/Pulse Opinion Research	Nov 28–29, 2007	Barack Obama	44%	John McCain	44%	800 LV	±3.5%
Rasmussen Reports/Pulse Opinion Research	Nov 28–29, 2007	Barack Obama	48%	Mitt Romney	39%	800 LV	±3.5%
Rasmussen Reports/Pulse Opinion Research	Nov 26–27, 2007	Barack Obama	43%	Rudy Giuliani	41%	800 LV	±3.5%
Rasmussen Reports/Pulse Opinion Research	Nov 26–27, 2007	Barack Obama	48%	Fred Thompson	41%	800 LV	±3.5%
Zogby Interactive	Nov 21–26, 2007	Barack Obama	46%	Rudy Giuliani	41%	9,150 LV	±1%
Zogby Interactive	Nov 21–26, 2007	Barack Obama	46%	Mike Huckabee	40%	9,150 LV	±1%
Zogby Interactive	Nov 21–26, 2007	Barack Obama	46%	Mitt Romney	40%	9,150 LV	±1%
Zogby Interactive	Nov 21–26, 2007	Barack Obama	47%	Fred Thompson	40%	9,150 LV	±1%
Zogby Interactive	Nov 21–26, 2007	Barack Obama	45%	John McCain	38%	9,150 LV	±1%
Zogby Interactive	Nov 21–26, 2007	John Edwards	42%	John McCain	42%	9,150 LV	±1%
Zogby Interactive	Nov 21–26, 2007	John Edwards	43%	Rudy Giuliani	42%	9,150 LV	±1%
Zogby Interactive	Nov 21–26, 2007	John Edwards	43%	Mike Huckabee	42%	9,150 LV	±1%
Zogby Interactive	Nov 21–26, 2007	John Edwards	44%	Mitt Romney	42%	9,150 LV	±1%
Zogby Interactive	Nov 21–26, 2007	John Edwards	45%	Fred Thompson	42%	9,150 LV	±1%
Zogby Interactive	Nov 21–26, 2007	Hillary Clinton	39%	Mike Huckabee	44%	9,150 LV	±1%
Zogby Interactive	Nov 21–26, 2007	Hillary Clinton	40%	Fred Thompson	44%	9,150 LV	±1%
Zogby Interactive	Nov 21–26, 2007	Hillary Clinton	38%	John McCain	42%	9,150 LV	±1%
Zogby Interactive	Nov 21–26, 2007	Hillary Clinton	40%	Rudy Giuliani	43%	9,150 LV	±1%
Zogby Interactive	Nov 21–26, 2007	Hillary Clinton	40%	Mitt Romney	43%	9,150 LV	±1%
Rasmussen Reports/Pulse Opinion Research	Nov 19–20, 2007	Hillary Clinton	42%	Rudy Giuliani	46%	800 LV	±3.5%
Rasmussen Reports/Pulse Opinion Research	Nov 19–20, 2007	Hillary Clinton	46%	Fred Thompson	44%	800 LV	±3.5%
Rasmussen Reports/Pulse Opinion Research	Nov 17–18, 2007	Barack Obama	46%	John McCain	43%	800 LV	±3.5%
Rasmussen Reports/Pulse Opinion Research	Nov 17–18, 2007	Barack Obama	46%	Mitt Romney	40%	800 LV	±3.5%
Fox News/Opinion Dynamics Corporation	Nov 13–14, 2007	Hillary Clinton	46%	John McCain	45%	900 RV	±3%
Fox News/Opinion Dynamics Corporation	Nov 13–14, 2007	Hillary Clinton	47%	Rudy Giuliani	43%	900 RV	±3%
Fox News/Opinion Dynamics Corporation	Nov 13–14, 2007	Hillary Clinton	49%	Fred Thompson	40%	900 RV	±3%
Fox News/Opinion Dynamics Corporation	Nov 13–14, 2007	Hillary Clinton	50%	Mitt Romney	37%	900 RV	±3%
USA Today/Gallup	Nov 11–14, 2007	Hillary Clinton	49%	Rudy Giuliani	44%	897 RV	±4%
USA Today/Gallup	Nov 11–14, 2007	Hillary Clinton	50%	John McCain	44%	897 RV	±4%
USA Today/Gallup	Nov 11–14, 2007	Hillary Clinton	54%	Mitt Romney	38%	897 RV	±4%
USA Today/Gallup	Nov 11–14, 2007	Hillary Clinton	53%	Fred Thompson	40%	897 RV	±4%
USA Today/Gallup	Nov 11–14, 2007	Barack Obama	45%	Rudy Giuliani	45%	897 RV	±4%
USA Today/Gallup	Nov 11–14, 2007	Barack Obama	47%	John McCain	44%	897 RV	±4%
USA Today/Gallup	Nov 11–14, 2007	Barack Obama	52%	Mitt Romney	35%	897 RV	±4%
USA Today/Gallup	Nov 11–14, 2007	Barack Obama	51%	Fred Thompson	38%	897 RV	±4%
Rasmussen Reports/Pulse Opinion Research	Nov 12–13, 2007	Barack Obama	43%	Rudy Giuliani	41%	800 LV	±3.5%
Rasmussen Reports/Pulse Opinion Research	Nov 12–13, 2007	Barack Obama	47%	Fred Thompson	42%	800 LV	±3.5%
Rasmussen Reports/Pulse Opinion Research	Nov 7–8, 2007	Hillary Clinton	45%	John McCain	47%	800 LV	±3.5%
Rasmussen Reports/Pulse Opinion Research	Nov 7–8, 2007	Hillary Clinton	47%	Mitt Romney	42%	800 LV	±3.5%
Rasmussen Reports/Pulse Opinion Research	Nov 5–6, 2007	Hillary Clinton	48%	Rudy Giuliani	42%	800 LV	±3.5%
Rasmussen Reports/Pulse Opinion Research	Nov 5–6, 2007	Hillary Clinton	48%	Fred Thompson	42%	800 LV	±3.5%
NBC News/Wall Street Journal	Nov 1–5, 2007	Hillary Clinton	46%	Rudy Giuliani	45%	1,509 A	±2.5%
NBC News/Wall Street Journal	Nov 1–5, 2007	Hillary Clinton	50%	Mitt Romney	39%	1,509 A	±2.5%
NBC News/Wall Street Journal	Nov 1–5, 2007	Barack Obama	44%	Rudy Giuliani	42%	1,509 A	±2.5%
NBC News/Wall Street Journal	Nov 1–5, 2007	Hillary Clinton	51%	Fred Thompson	37%	Not reported	Not reported
NBC News/Wall Street Journal	Nov 1–5, 2007	Hillary Clinton	47%	John McCain	43%	Not reported	Not reported
NBC News/Wall Street Journal	Nov 1–5, 2007	Barack Obama	48%	Mitt Romney	34%	Not reported	Not reported
NBC News/Wall Street Journal	Nov 1–5, 2007	John Edwards	45%	Rudy Giuliani	44%	Not reported	Not reported
NBC News/Wall Street Journal	Nov 1–5, 2007	Al Gore	46%	Rudy Giuliani	47%	Not reported	Not reported
Rasmussen Reports/Pulse Opinion Research	Nov 2–4, 2007	Barack Obama	49%	Mike Huckabee	38%	1,200 LV	±3%
Rasmussen Reports/Pulse Opinion Research	Nov 2–4, 2007	Hillary Clinton	46%	Mike Huckabee	43%	1,200 LV	±3%
USA Today/Gallup	Nov 2–4, 2007	Hillary Clinton	51%	Rudy Giuliani	45%	1,024 A	±3%
CNN/Opinion Research Corporation	Nov 2–4, 2007	Hillary Clinton	51%	Rudy Giuliani	45%	929 RV	±3%
Newsweek/Princeton Survey Research Associates International	Oct 31 – Nov 1, 2007	Hillary Clinton	49%	Rudy Giuliani	45%	1,002 RV	±4%
Newsweek/Princeton Survey Research Associates International	Oct 31 – Nov 1, 2007	Hillary Clinton	49%	Fred Thompson	45%	1,002 RV	±4%
Newsweek/Princeton Survey Research Associates International	Oct 31 – Nov 1, 2007	Hillary Clinton	49%	Mitt Romney	45%	1,002 RV	±4%
Newsweek/Princeton Survey Research Associates International	Oct 31 – Nov 1, 2007	John Edwards	48%	Rudy Giuliani	45%	1,002 RV	±4%
Newsweek/Princeton Survey Research Associates International	Oct 31 – Nov 1, 2007	John Edwards	53%	Fred Thompson	39%	1,002 RV	±4%
Newsweek/Princeton Survey Research Associates International	Oct 31 – Nov 1, 2007	John Edwards	53%	Mitt Romney	37%	1,002 RV	±4%
Newsweek/Princeton Survey Research Associates International	Oct 31 – Nov 1, 2007	Barack Obama	48%	Rudy Giuliani	45%	1,002 RV	±4%
Newsweek/Princeton Survey Research Associates International	Oct 31 – Nov 1, 2007	Barack Obama	52%	Fred Thompson	39%	1,002 RV	±4%
Newsweek/Princeton Survey Research Associates International	Oct 31 – Nov 1, 2007	Barack Obama	53%	Mitt Romney	37%	1,002 RV	±4%
Rasmussen Reports/Pulse Opinion Research	Oct 31 – Nov 1, 2007	John Edwards	47%	John McCain	38%	800 LV	±3.5%
Rasmussen Reports/Pulse Opinion Research	Oct 31 – Nov 1, 2007	John Edwards	50%	Mitt Romney	34%	800 LV	±3.5%
WNBC/Marist College	Oct 29 – Nov 1, 2007	Hillary Clinton	50%	Rudy Giuliani	40%	811 RV	±3.5%
ABC News/Washington Post	Oct 29 – Nov 1, 2007	Hillary Clinton	50%	Rudy Giuliani	46%	1,131 A	±3%
ABC News/Washington Post	Oct 29 – Nov 1, 2007	Hillary Clinton	52%	John McCain	43%	1,131 A	±3%
ABC News/Washington Post	Oct 29 – Nov 1, 2007	Hillary Clinton	56%	Fred Thompson	40%	1,131 A	±3%
ABC News/Washington Post	Oct 29 – Nov 1, 2007	Hillary Clinton	57%	Mitt Romney	39%	1,131 A	±3%
Rasmussen Reports/Pulse Opinion Research	Oct 29–30, 2007	Barack Obama	43%	Rudy Giuliani	45%	800 LV	±3.5%
Rasmussen Reports/Pulse Opinion Research	Oct 29–30, 2007	Barack Obama	44%	Fred Thompson	43%	800 LV	±3.5%
Quinnipiac University	Oct 23–29, 2007	Barack Obama	43%	John McCain	43%	1,636 RV	±2.4%
Quinnipiac University	Oct 23–29, 2007	Barack Obama	43%	Rudy Giuliani	42%	1,636 RV	±2.4%
Quinnipiac University	Oct 23–29, 2007	Barack Obama	45%	Fred Thompson	37%	1,636 RV	±2.4%
Quinnipiac University	Oct 23–29, 2007	Barack Obama	46%	Mitt Romney	36%	1,636 RV	±2.4%
Quinnipiac University	Oct 23–29, 2007	Hillary Clinton	43%	Rudy Giuliani	45%	1,636 RV	±2.4%
Quinnipiac University	Oct 23–29, 2007	Hillary Clinton	44%	John McCain	44%	1,636 RV	±2.4%
Quinnipiac University	Oct 23–29, 2007	Hillary Clinton	46%	Fred Thompson	41%	1,636 RV	±2.4%
Quinnipiac University	Oct 23–29, 2007	Hillary Clinton	48%	Mitt Romney	38%	1,636 RV	±2.4%
Quinnipiac University	Oct 23–29, 2007	John Edwards	41%	Rudy Giuliani	44%	1,636 RV	±2.4%
Quinnipiac University	Oct 23–29, 2007	John Edwards	42%	John McCain	42%	1,636 RV	±2.4%
Quinnipiac University	Oct 23–29, 2007	John Edwards	46%	Fred Thompson	36%	1,636 RV	±2.4%
Quinnipiac University	Oct 23–29, 2007	John Edwards	47%	Mitt Romney	34%	1,636 RV	±2.4%
Rasmussen Reports/Pulse Opinion Research	Oct 26–28, 2007	Stephen Colbert	36%	Ron Paul	32%	1,200 LV	±3%
Rasmussen Reports/Pulse Opinion Research	Oct 26–28, 2007	Dennis Kucinich	32%	Stephen Colbert	37%	1,200 LV	±3%
Rasmussen Reports/Pulse Opinion Research	Oct 24–25, 2007	John Edwards	44%	Rudy Giuliani	45%	800 LV	±3.5%
Rasmussen Reports/Pulse Opinion Research	Oct 24–25, 2007	John Edwards	48%	Fred Thompson	39%	800 LV	±3.5%
Rasmussen Reports/Pulse Opinion Research	Oct 22–23, 2007	Hillary Clinton	44%	Rudy Giuliani	46%	800 LV	±3.5%
Rasmussen Reports/Pulse Opinion Research	Oct 22–23, 2007	Hillary Clinton	47%	Fred Thompson	45%	800 LV	±3.5%
Democracy Corps/Greenberg Quinlan Rosner (D)	Oct 21–23, 2007	Hillary Clinton	49%	Rudy Giuliani	45%	994 LV	Not reported
Democracy Corps/Greenberg Quinlan Rosner (D)	Oct 21–23, 2007	Hillary Clinton	51%	Fred Thompson	44%	994 LV	Not reported
Pew Research Center	Oct 17–23, 2007	Hillary Clinton	51%	Rudy Giuliani	43%	1607 RV	Not reported
Los Angeles Times/Bloomberg	Oct 19–22, 2007	Hillary Clinton	47%	Rudy Giuliani	41%	512 RV	±4%
Los Angeles Times/Bloomberg	Oct 19–22, 2007	Hillary Clinton	48%	John McCain	38%	512 RV	±4%
Los Angeles Times/Bloomberg	Oct 19–22, 2007	Hillary Clinton	49%	Fred Thompson	38%	512 RV	±4%
Los Angeles Times/Bloomberg	Oct 19–22, 2007	Hillary Clinton	49%	Mitt Romney	34%	512 RV	±4%
Los Angeles Times/Bloomberg	Oct 19–22, 2007	Barack Obama	43%	Rudy Giuliani	40%	522 RV	±4%
Los Angeles Times/Bloomberg	Oct 19–22, 2007	Barack Obama	44%	John McCain	36%	522 RV	±4%
Los Angeles Times/Bloomberg	Oct 19–22, 2007	Barack Obama	42%	Mitt Romney	32%	522 RV	±4%
Los Angeles Times/Bloomberg	Oct 19–22, 2007	Barack Obama	46%	Fred Thompson	31%	522 RV	±4%
Cook Political Report/RT Strategies	Oct 18–21, 2007	Hillary Clinton	43%	Rudy Giuliani	39%	855 RV	±3.4%
Cook Political Report/RT Strategies	Oct 18–21, 2007	Hillary Clinton	46%	Mitt Romney	37%	855 RV	±3.4%
Rasmussen Reports/Pulse Opinion Research	Oct 15–16, 2007	Barack Obama	44%	John McCain	45%	800 LV	±3.5%
Rasmussen Reports/Pulse Opinion Research	Oct 15–16, 2007	Barack Obama	48%	Mitt Romney	39%	800 LV	±3.5%
Rasmussen Reports/Pulse Opinion Research	Oct 15–16, 2007	Barack Obama	46%	Rudy Giuliani	41%	800 LV	±3.5%
Rasmussen Reports/Pulse Opinion Research	Oct 15–16, 2007	Barack Obama	47%	Fred Thompson	41%	800 LV	±3.5%
Rasmussen Reports/Pulse Opinion Research	Oct 12–14, 2007	Barack Obama	50%	Ron Paul	33%	1,200 LV	±3%
Rasmussen Reports/Pulse Opinion Research	Oct 12–14, 2007	Hillary Clinton	48%	Ron Paul	38%	1,200 LV	±3%
CNN/Opinion Research Corporation	Oct 12–14, 2007	Hillary Clinton	49%	Rudy Giuliani	47%	927 RV	±3%
Rasmussen Reports/Pulse Opinion Research	Oct 10–11, 2007	Hillary Clinton	44%	John McCain	43%	800 LV	±3.5%
Rasmussen Reports/Pulse Opinion Research	Oct 10–11, 2007	Hillary Clinton	47%	Mitt Romney	41%	800 LV	±3.5%
Fox News/Opinion Dynamics Corporation	Oct 9–10, 2007	Hillary Clinton	47%	John McCain	44%	900 RV	±3%
Fox News/Opinion Dynamics Corporation	Oct 9–10, 2007	Hillary Clinton	47%	Rudy Giuliani	43%	900 RV	±3%
Fox News/Opinion Dynamics Corporation	Oct 9–10, 2007	Hillary Clinton	50%	Fred Thompson	38%	900 RV	±3%
Fox News/Opinion Dynamics Corporation	Oct 9–10, 2007	Hillary Clinton	50%	Mitt Romney	38%	900 RV	±3%
Rasmussen Reports/Pulse Opinion Research	Oct 8–9, 2007	Hillary Clinton	48%	Rudy Giuliani	41%	800 LV	±3.5%
Rasmussen Reports/Pulse Opinion Research	Oct 8–9, 2007	Hillary Clinton	52%	Fred Thompson	37%	800 LV	±3.5%
NPR/Public Opinion Research/Greenberg Quinlan Rosner	Oct 4–7, 2007	Hillary Clinton	47%	Rudy Giuliani	44%	800 LV	±3.46%
NPR/Public Opinion Research/Greenberg Quinlan Rosner	Oct 4–7, 2007	Barack Obama	44%	Rudy Giuliani	44%	800 LV	±3.46%
NPR/Public Opinion Research/Greenberg Quinlan Rosner	Oct 4–7, 2007	Barack Obama	48%	Fred Thompson	39%	800 LV	±3.46%
NPR/Public Opinion Research/Greenberg Quinlan Rosner	Oct 4–7, 2007	Hillary Clinton	50%	Fred Thompson	42%	800 LV	±3.46%
Rasmussen Reports/Pulse Opinion Research	Oct 3–4, 2007	John Edwards	47%	John McCain	40%	800 LV	±3.5%
Rasmussen Reports/Pulse Opinion Research	Oct 3–4, 2007	John Edwards	52%	Mitt Romney	35%	800 LV	±3.5%
Rasmussen Reports/Pulse Opinion Research	Oct 1–2, 2007	Barack Obama	47%	Rudy Giuliani	42%	800 LV	±3.5%
Rasmussen Reports/Pulse Opinion Research	Oct 1–2, 2007	Barack Obama	49%	Fred Thompson	38%	800 LV	±3.5%
Rasmussen Reports/Pulse Opinion Research	Sep 28–30, 2007	Barack Obama	47%	Mike Huckabee	38%	1,200 LV	±3%
Rasmussen Reports/Pulse Opinion Research	Sep 28–30, 2007	Hillary Clinton	48%	Mike Huckabee	40%	1,200 LV	±3%
ABC News/Washington Post	Sep 27–30, 2007	Hillary Clinton	51%	Rudy Giuliani	43%	1,114 A	±3%
Rasmussen Reports/Pulse Opinion Research	Sep 26–27, 2007	John Edwards	50%	Rudy Giuliani	41%	800 LV	±3.5%
Rasmussen Reports/Pulse Opinion Research	Sep 26–27, 2007	John Edwards	49%	Fred Thompson	39%	800 LV	±3.5%
Fox News/Opinion Dynamics Corporation	Sep 25–26, 2007	Hillary Clinton	46%	Rudy Giuliani	39%	900 RV	±3%
Fox News/Opinion Dynamics Corporation	Sep 25–26, 2007	Hillary Clinton	46%	John McCain	39%	900 RV	±3%
Fox News/Opinion Dynamics Corporation	Sep 25–26, 2007	Hillary Clinton	48%	Fred Thompson	35%	900 RV	±3%
Fox News/Opinion Dynamics Corporation	Sep 25–26, 2007	Barack Obama	41%	Rudy Giuliani	40%	900 RV	±3%
Fox News/Opinion Dynamics Corporation	Sep 25–26, 2007	Barack Obama	40%	John McCain	38%	900 RV	±3%
Fox News/Opinion Dynamics Corporation	Sep 25–26, 2007	Barack Obama	45%	Fred Thompson	33%	900 RV	±3%
Rasmussen Reports/Pulse Opinion Research	Sep 24–25, 2007	Hillary Clinton	48%	Rudy Giuliani	43%	800 LV	±3.5%
Rasmussen Reports/Pulse Opinion Research	Sep 24–25, 2007	Hillary Clinton	49%	Fred Thompson	41%	800 LV	±3.5%
Rasmussen Reports/Pulse Opinion Research	Sep 21–23, 2007	Bill Richardson	40%	Rudy Giuliani	43%	1,200 LV	±2.9%
Rasmussen Reports/Pulse Opinion Research	Sep 21–23, 2007	Bill Richardson	41%	Fred Thompson	42%	1,200 LV	±2.9%
Rasmussen Reports/Pulse Opinion Research	Sep 19–20, 2007	Barack Obama	46%	Mitt Romney	43%	800 LV	±3.5%
Rasmussen Reports/Pulse Opinion Research	Sep 19–20, 2007	Barack Obama	46%	John McCain	41%	800 LV	±3.5%
Rasmussen Reports/Pulse Opinion Research	Sep 17–18, 2007	Barack Obama	47%	Rudy Giuliani	42%	800 LV	±3.5%
Rasmussen Reports/Pulse Opinion Research	Sep 17–18, 2007	Barack Obama	47%	Fred Thompson	41%	800 LV	±3.5%
The Cook Political Report/RT Strategies	Sep 13–16, 2007	Hillary Clinton	45%	Rudy Giuliani	43%	855 RV	±3.4%
Rasmussen Reports/Pulse Opinion Research	Sep 12–13, 2007	Hillary Clinton	46%	John McCain	45%	800 LV	±3.5%
Rasmussen Reports/Pulse Opinion Research	Sep 12–13, 2007	Hillary Clinton	49%	Mitt Romney	40%	800 LV	±3.5%
Rasmussen Reports/Pulse Opinion Research	Sep 10–11, 2007	Hillary Clinton	46%	Rudy Giuliani	45%	800 LV	±3.5%
Rasmussen Reports/Pulse Opinion Research	Sep 10–11, 2007	Hillary Clinton	48%	Fred Thompson	43%	800 LV	±3.5%
NBC News/Wall Street Journal	Sep 7–10, 2007	Hillary Clinton	49%	Rudy Giuliani	42%	1,002 A	±3.1%
NBC News/Wall Street Journal	Sep 7–10, 2007	Hillary Clinton	50%	Fred Thompson	41%	1,002 A	±3.1%
NBC News/Wall Street Journal	Sep 7–10, 2007	Hillary Clinton	51%	Mitt Romney	38%	1,002 A	±3.1%
NBC News/Wall Street Journal	Sep 7–10, 2007	Hillary Clinton	50%	Mike Huckabee	36%	1,002 A	±3.1%
NBC News/Wall Street Journal	Sep 7–10, 2007	Barack Obama	47%	Fred Thompson	38%	1,002 A	±3.1%
NBC News/Wall Street Journal	Sep 7–10, 2007	Barack Obama	51%	Mitt Romney	34%	1,002 A	±3.1%
CNN/Opinion Research Corporation	Sep 7–9, 2007	Hillary Clinton	50%	Rudy Giuliani	46%	914 RV	±3%
CNN/Opinion Research Corporation	Sep 7–9, 2007	Hillary Clinton	55%	Fred Thompson	42%	914 RV	±3%
CNN/Opinion Research Corporation	Sep 7–9, 2007	Barack Obama	45%	Rudy Giuliani	49%	914 RV	±3%
CNN/Opinion Research Corporation	Sep 7–9, 2007	Barack Obama	53%	Fred Thompson	41%	914 RV	±3%
Rasmussen Reports/Pulse Opinion Research	Sep 4, 2007	Barack Obama	44%	Rudy Giuliani	45%	800 LV	±3.5%
Rasmussen Reports/Pulse Opinion Research	Sep 4, 2007	Barack Obama	46%	Fred Thompson	42%	800 LV	±3.5%
Rasmussen Reports/Pulse Opinion Research	Aug 29–30, 2007	John Edwards	45%	John McCain	41%	800 LV	±3.5%
Rasmussen Reports/Pulse Opinion Research	Aug 29–30, 2007	John Edwards	49%	Mitt Romney	38%	800 LV	±3.5%
Rasmussen Reports/Pulse Opinion Research	Aug 27–28, 2007	Hillary Clinton	44%	Rudy Giuliani	47%	800 LV	±3.5%
Rasmussen Reports/Pulse Opinion Research	Aug 27–28, 2007	Hillary Clinton	48%	Fred Thompson	44%	800 LV	±3.5%
Rasmussen Reports/Pulse Opinion Research	Aug 24–26, 2007	Barack Obama	48%	Tom Tancredo	31%	1,200 LV	±3%
Rasmussen Reports/Pulse Opinion Research	Aug 24–26, 2007	Hillary Clinton	50%	Tom Tancredo	37%	1,200 LV	±3%
Rasmussen Reports/Pulse Opinion Research	Aug 22–23, 2007	John Edwards	49%	Rudy Giuliani	41%	800 LV	±4%
Rasmussen Reports/Pulse Opinion Research	Aug 22–23, 2007	John Edwards	49%	Fred Thompson	35%	800 LV	±4%
Rasmussen Reports/Pulse Opinion Research	Aug 20–21, 2007	Barack Obama	45%	Rudy Giuliani	43%	800 LV	±3.5%
Rasmussen Reports/Pulse Opinion Research	Aug 20–21, 2007	Barack Obama	45%	Fred Thompson	41%	800 LV	±3.5%
Rasmussen Reports/Pulse Opinion Research	Aug 17–19, 2007	Barack Obama	48%	Mike Huckabee	39%	1,200 LV	±2.9%
Rasmussen Reports/Pulse Opinion Research	Aug 17–19, 2007	Hillary Clinton	49%	Mike Huckabee	41%	1,200 LV	±2.9%
Rasmussen Reports/Pulse Opinion Research	Aug 15–16, 2007	Hillary Clinton	46%	John McCain	44%	800 LV	±3.5%
Rasmussen Reports/Pulse Opinion Research	Aug 15–16, 2007	Hillary Clinton	51%	Mitt Romney	40%	800 LV	±3.5%
Rasmussen Reports/Pulse Opinion Research	Aug 13–14, 2007	Hillary Clinton	40%	Rudy Giuliani	47%	800 LV	±3.5%
Rasmussen Reports/Pulse Opinion Research	Aug 13–14, 2007	Hillary Clinton	46%	Fred Thompson	43%	800 LV	±3.5%
Quinnipiac University	Aug 7–13, 2007	Hillary Clinton	46%	Rudy Giuliani	43%	1,545 RV	±2.5%
Quinnipiac University	Aug 7–13, 2007	Hillary Clinton	47%	John McCain	41%	1,545 RV	±2.5%
Quinnipiac University	Aug 7–13, 2007	Hillary Clinton	49%	Fred Thompson	38%	1,545 RV	±2.5%
Quinnipiac University	Aug 7–13, 2007	John Edwards	43%	Rudy Giuliani	42%	1,545 RV	±2.5%
Quinnipiac University	Aug 7–13, 2007	John Edwards	45%	John McCain	37%	1,545 RV	±2.5%
Quinnipiac University	Aug 7–13, 2007	John Edwards	49%	Fred Thompson	32%	1,545 RV	±2.5%
Quinnipiac University	Aug 7–13, 2007	Barack Obama	42%	Rudy Giuliani	42%	1,545 RV	±2.5%
Quinnipiac University	Aug 7–13, 2007	Barack Obama	43%	John McCain	39%	1,545 RV	±2.5%
Quinnipiac University	Aug 7–13, 2007	Barack Obama	46%	Fred Thompson	35%	1,545 RV	±2.5%
Rasmussen Reports/Pulse Opinion Research	Aug 10–12, 2007	Joe Biden	34%	Rudy Giuliani	50%	1,200 LV	±2.8%
Rasmussen Reports/Pulse Opinion Research	Aug 10–12, 2007	Joe Biden	39%	Fred Thompson	39%	1,200 LV	±2.8%
Rasmussen Reports/Pulse Opinion Research	Aug 8–9, 2007	John Edwards	46%	Rudy Giuliani	44%	800 LV	±3.5%
Rasmussen Reports/Pulse Opinion Research	Aug 8–9, 2007	John Edwards	47%	Fred Thompson	41%	800 LV	±3.5%
Rasmussen Reports/Pulse Opinion Research	Aug 6–7, 2007	Barack Obama	44%	Rudy Giuliani	43%	800 LV	±3.5%
Rasmussen Reports/Pulse Opinion Research	Aug 6–7, 2007	Barack Obama	46%	Fred Thompson	39%	800 LV	±3.5%
Rasmussen Reports/Pulse Opinion Research	Aug 3–5, 2007	Bill Richardson	39%	Rudy Giuliani	47%	1,200 LV	±2.9%
Rasmussen Reports/Pulse Opinion Research	Aug 3–5, 2007	Bill Richardson	40%	Fred Thompson	41%	1,200 LV	±2.9%
Rasmussen Reports/Pulse Opinion Research	Aug 1–2, 2007	Barack Obama	46%	John McCain	40%	800 LV	±4%
Rasmussen Reports/Pulse Opinion Research	Aug 1–2, 2007	Hillary Clinton	45%	John McCain	43%	800 LV	±4%
Rasmussen Reports/Pulse Opinion Research	Jul 30–31, 2007	Hillary Clinton	45%	Rudy Giuliani	46%	839 LV	±3.5%
Rasmussen Reports/Pulse Opinion Research	Jul 30–31, 2007	Hillary Clinton	45%	Fred Thompson	46%	839 LV	±3.5%
NBC News/Wall Street Journal	Jul 27–30, 2007	Hillary Clinton	47%	Rudy Giuliani	41%	1,005 A	±3.1%
NBC News/Wall Street Journal	Jul 27–30, 2007	Barack Obama	45%	Rudy Giuliani	40%	1,005 A	±3.1%
Rasmussen Reports/Pulse Opinion Research	Jul 27–29, 2007	Dennis Kucinich	34%	Rudy Giuliani	48%	1,200 LV	±2.9%
Rasmussen Reports/Pulse Opinion Research	Jul 27–29, 2007	Dennis Kucinich	34%	Fred Thompson	43%	1,200 LV	±2.9%
Rasmussen Reports/Pulse Opinion Research	Jul 25–26, 2007	John Edwards	49%	Rudy Giuliani	42%	643 LV	±4%
Rasmussen Reports/Pulse Opinion Research	Jul 25–26, 2007	John Edwards	50%	Fred Thompson	39%	643 LV	±4%
Rasmussen Reports/Pulse Opinion Research	Jul 23–24, 2007	Barack Obama	47%	Rudy Giuliani	41%	1,472 LV	±2.6%
Rasmussen Reports/Pulse Opinion Research	Jul 23–24, 2007	Barack Obama	46%	Fred Thompson	40%	1,472 LV	±2.6%
Rasmussen Reports/Pulse Opinion Research	Jul 20–22, 2007	Barack Obama	50%	Ron Paul	30%	1,461 LV	±2.6%
Rasmussen Reports/Pulse Opinion Research	Jul 20–22, 2007	Hillary Clinton	49%	Ron Paul	34%	1,461 LV	±2.6%
Rasmussen Reports/Pulse Opinion Research	Jul 18–19, 2007	John Edwards	45%	Mitt Romney	38%	800 LV	±4%
Rasmussen Reports/Pulse Opinion Research	Jul 18–19, 2007	John Edwards	52%	John McCain	36%	800 LV	±4%
Fox News/Opinion Dynamics Corporation	Jul 17–18, 2007	Hillary Clinton	45%	John McCain	42%	900 RV	±3%
Fox News/Opinion Dynamics Corporation	Jul 17–18, 2007	Hillary Clinton	46%	Rudy Giuliani	41%	900 RV	±3%
Fox News/Opinion Dynamics Corporation	Jul 17–18, 2007	Hillary Clinton	47%	Fred Thompson	38%	900 RV	±3%
Fox News/Opinion Dynamics Corporation	Jul 17–18, 2007	Hillary Clinton	50%	Mitt Romney	35%	900 RV	±3%
Fox News/Opinion Dynamics Corporation	Jul 17–18, 2007	Barack Obama	45%	Rudy Giuliani	41%	900 RV	±3%
Fox News/Opinion Dynamics Corporation	Jul 17–18, 2007	Barack Obama	47%	John McCain	37%	900 RV	±3%
Fox News/Opinion Dynamics Corporation	Jul 17–18, 2007	Barack Obama	48%	Fred Thompson	32%	900 RV	±3%
George Washington University/Tarrance Group/Lake Research Group	Jul 15–18, 2007	Barack Obama	52%	Rudy Giuliani	43%	1,000 LV	±3.1%
George Washington University/Tarrance Group/Lake Research Group	Jul 15–18, 2007	Barack Obama	56%	Fred Thompson	36%	1,000 LV	±3.1%
George Washington University/Tarrance Group/Lake Research Group	Jul 15–18, 2007	Hillary Clinton	44%	Rudy Giuliani	50%	1,000 LV	±3.1%
George Washington University/Tarrance Group/Lake Research Group	Jul 15–18, 2007	Hillary Clinton	47%	Fred Thompson	45%	1,000 LV	±3.1%
Rasmussen Reports/Pulse Opinion Research	Jul 16–17, 2007	Barack Obama	47%	Mitt Romney	38%	1,029 LV	±3%
Rasmussen Reports/Pulse Opinion Research	Jul 16–17, 2007	Barack Obama	47%	John McCain	38%	1,029 LV	±3%
Rasmussen Reports/Pulse Opinion Research	Jul 13–15, 2007	Joe Biden	37%	Rudy Giuliani	46%	1,200 LV	±3%
Rasmussen Reports/Pulse Opinion Research	Jul 13–15, 2007	Joe Biden	38%	Fred Thompson	40%	1,200 LV	±3%
USA Today/Gallup	Jul 12–15, 2007	Hillary Clinton	46%	Rudy Giuliani	49%	908 RV	±4%
USA Today/Gallup	Jul 12–15, 2007	Hillary Clinton	48%	Fred Thompson	45%	908 RV	±4%
USA Today/Gallup	Jul 12–15, 2007	Barack Obama	45%	Rudy Giuliani	49%	908 RV	±4%
USA Today/Gallup	Jul 12–15, 2007	Barack Obama	51%	Fred Thompson	40%	908 RV	±4%
Zogby America Poll	Jul 12–14, 2007	Hillary Clinton	45%	John McCain	43%	1,012 LV	±3.1%
Zogby America Poll	Jul 12–14, 2007	Hillary Clinton	47%	Rudy Giuliani	41%	1,012 LV	±3.1%
Zogby America Poll	Jul 12–14, 2007	Hillary Clinton	48%	Fred Thompson	41%	1,012 LV	±3.1%
Zogby America Poll	Jul 12–14, 2007	Hillary Clinton	48%	Mitt Romney	38%	1,012 LV	±3.1%
Zogby America Poll	Jul 12–14, 2007	Barack Obama	45%	John McCain	42%	1,012 LV	±3.1%
Zogby America Poll	Jul 12–14, 2007	Barack Obama	46%	Rudy Giuliani	42%	1,012 LV	±3.1%
Zogby America Poll	Jul 12–14, 2007	Barack Obama	48%	Fred Thompson	40%	1,012 LV	±3.1%
Zogby America Poll	Jul 12–14, 2007	Barack Obama	49%	Mitt Romney	35%	1,012 LV	±3.1%
Zogby America Poll	Jul 12–14, 2007	John Edwards	43%	Rudy Giuliani	46%	1,012 LV	±3.1%
Zogby America Poll	Jul 12–14, 2007	John Edwards	43%	John McCain	43%	1,012 LV	±3.1%
Zogby America Poll	Jul 12–14, 2007	John Edwards	46%	Fred Thompson	40%	1,012 LV	±3.1%
Zogby America Poll	Jul 12–14, 2007	John Edwards	47%	Mitt Romney	38%	1,012 LV	±3.1%
Rasmussen Reports/Pulse Opinion Research	Jul 9–10, 2007	Hillary Clinton	44%	Rudy Giuliani	43%	800 LV	±4%
Rasmussen Reports/Pulse Opinion Research	Jul 9–10, 2007	Hillary Clinton	47%	John McCain	38%	800 LV	±4%
Rasmussen Reports/Pulse Opinion Research	Jun 27–28, 2007	Hillary Clinton	45%	Fred Thompson	45%	800 LV	±4%
Rasmussen Reports/Pulse Opinion Research	Jun 27–28, 2007	Hillary Clinton	46%	Mitt Romney	42%	800 LV	±4%
Rasmussen Reports/Pulse Opinion Research	Jun 25–26, 2007	John Edwards	45%	Rudy Giuliani	45%	800 LV	±4%
Rasmussen Reports/Pulse Opinion Research	Jun 25–26, 2007	John Edwards	50%	Fred Thompson	41%	800 LV	±4%
Rasmussen Reports/Pulse Opinion Research	Jun 22–24, 2007	Barack Obama	41%	Rudy Giuliani	44%	1,200 LV	±3%
Rasmussen Reports/Pulse Opinion Research	Jun 22–24, 2007	Barack Obama	43%	Fred Thompson	41%	1,200 LV	±3%
CNN/Opinion Research Corporation	Jun 22–24, 2007	Hillary Clinton	49%	Rudy Giuliani	48%	907 RV	±3.5%
CNN/Opinion Research Corporation	Jun 22–24, 2007	Hillary Clinton	50%	Fred Thompson	46%	907 RV	±3.5%
CNN/Opinion Research Corporation	Jun 22–24, 2007	Hillary Clinton	49%	John McCain	47%	907 RV	±3.5%
CNN/Opinion Research Corporation	Jun 22–24, 2007	Barack Obama	46%	Rudy Giuliani	48%	907 RV	±3.5%
CNN/Opinion Research Corporation	Jun 22–24, 2007	Barack Obama	52%	Fred Thompson	40%	907 RV	±3.5%
CNN/Opinion Research Corporation	Jun 22–24, 2007	Barack Obama	48%	John McCain	44%	907 RV	±3.5%
Cook Political Report/RT Strategies	Jun 21–23, 2007	Hillary Clinton	45%	Rudy Giuliani	44%	844 RV	±3.4%
Cook Political Report/RT Strategies	Jun 21–23, 2007	Hillary Clinton	45%	Fred Thompson	40%	844 RV	±3.4%
Cook Political Report/RT Strategies	Jun 21–23, 2007	Hillary Clinton	48%	Mitt Romney	38%	844 RV	±3.4%
Cook Political Report/RT Strategies	Jun 21–23, 2007	Barack Obama	42%	Rudy Giuliani	41%	844 RV	±3.4%
Cook Political Report/RT Strategies	Jun 21–23, 2007	Barack Obama	46%	Fred Thompson	35%	844 RV	±3.4%
Cook Political Report/RT Strategies	Jun 21–23, 2007	Barack Obama	47%	Mitt Romney	34%	844 RV	±3.4%
Newsweek/Princeton Survey Research Associates International	Jun 20–21, 2007	Hillary Clinton	51%	Rudy Giuliani	44%	831 RV	±4%
Newsweek/Princeton Survey Research Associates International	Jun 20–21, 2007	Hillary Clinton	53%	Fred Thompson	42%	831 RV	±4%
Newsweek/Princeton Survey Research Associates International	Jun 20–21, 2007	Hillary Clinton	50%	John McCain	45%	831 RV	±4%
Newsweek/Princeton Survey Research Associates International	Jun 20–21, 2007	Hillary Clinton	55%	Mitt Romney	40%	831 RV	±4%
Newsweek/Princeton Survey Research Associates International	Jun 20–21, 2007	Barack Obama	49%	Rudy Giuliani	44%	831 RV	±4%
Newsweek/Princeton Survey Research Associates International	Jun 20–21, 2007	Barack Obama	53%	Fred Thompson	39%	831 RV	±4%
Newsweek/Princeton Survey Research Associates International	Jun 20–21, 2007	Barack Obama	51%	John McCain	41%	831 RV	±4%
Newsweek/Princeton Survey Research Associates International	Jun 20–21, 2007	Barack Obama	53%	Mitt Romney	37%	831 RV	±4%
Newsweek/Princeton Survey Research Associates International	Jun 20–21, 2007	John Edwards	48%	Rudy Giuliani	46%	831 RV	±4%
Newsweek/Princeton Survey Research Associates International	Jun 20–21, 2007	John Edwards	54%	Fred Thompson	38%	831 RV	±4%
Newsweek/Princeton Survey Research Associates International	Jun 20–21, 2007	John Edwards	50%	John McCain	44%	831 RV	±4%
Newsweek/Princeton Survey Research Associates International	Jun 20–21, 2007	John Edwards	57%	Mitt Romney	36%	831 RV	±4%
Rasmussen Reports/Pulse Opinion Research	Jun 20–21, 2007	Hillary Clinton	45%	Rudy Giuliani	46%	792 LV	±4%
Rasmussen Reports/Pulse Opinion Research	Jun 20–21, 2007	Hillary Clinton	46%	John McCain	42%	792 LV	±4%
Rasmussen Reports/Pulse Opinion Research	Jun 18–19, 2007	Bill Richardson	38%	Rudy Giuliani	44%	800 LV	±4%
Rasmussen Reports/Pulse Opinion Research	Jun 18–19, 2007	Bill Richardson	35%	Fred Thompson	43%	800 LV	±4%
Rasmussen Reports/Pulse Opinion Research	Jun 15–17, 2007	John Edwards	49%	John McCain	36%	800 LV	±4%
Rasmussen Reports/Pulse Opinion Research	Jun 15–17, 2007	John Edwards	51%	Mitt Romney	33%	800 LV	±4%
Cook Political Report/RT Strategies	Jun 15–17, 2007	Hillary Clinton	42%	Rudy Giuliani	42%	855 RV	±3.4%
Cook Political Report/RT Strategies	Jun 15–17, 2007	Hillary Clinton	42%	Fred Thompson	42%	855 RV	±3.4%
Cook Political Report/RT Strategies	Jun 15–17, 2007	Hillary Clinton	45%	Mitt Romney	38%	855 RV	±3.4%
Cook Political Report/RT Strategies	Jun 15–17, 2007	Barack Obama	42%	Rudy Giuliani	42%	855 RV	±3.4%
Cook Political Report/RT Strategies	Jun 15–17, 2007	Barack Obama	46%	Fred Thompson	33%	855 RV	±3.4%
Cook Political Report/RT Strategies	Jun 15–17, 2007	Barack Obama	47%	Mitt Romney	31%	855 RV	±3.4%
Rasmussen Reports/Pulse Opinion Research	Jun 13–14, 2007	Barack Obama	46%	John McCain	38%	800 LV	±4%
USA Today/Gallup	Jun 11–14, 2007	Hillary Clinton	50%	Rudy Giuliani	46%	927 RV	±4%
USA Today/Gallup	Jun 11–14, 2007	Hillary Clinton	49%	John McCain	46%	927 RV	±4%
USA Today/Gallup	Jun 11–14, 2007	Hillary Clinton	53%	Mitt Romney	40%	927 RV	±4%
USA Today/Gallup	Jun 11–14, 2007	Barack Obama	50%	Rudy Giuliani	45%	927 RV	±4%
USA Today/Gallup	Jun 11–14, 2007	Barack Obama	48%	John McCain	46%	927 RV	±4%
USA Today/Gallup	Jun 11–14, 2007	Barack Obama	57%	Mitt Romney	36%	927 RV	±4%
USA Today/Gallup	Jun 11–14, 2007	John Edwards	50%	Rudy Giuliani	45%	927 RV	±4%
USA Today/Gallup	Jun 11–14, 2007	John Edwards	50%	John McCain	44%	927 RV	±4%
USA Today/Gallup	Jun 11–14, 2007	John Edwards	61%	Mitt Romney	32%	927 RV	±4%
Rasmussen Reports/Pulse Opinion Research	Jun 11–12, 2007	Hillary Clinton	48%	Fred Thompson	43%	800 LV	±4%
Rasmussen Reports/Pulse Opinion Research	Jun 11–12, 2007	Hillary Clinton	50%	Mitt Romney	41%	800 LV	±4%
NBC News/Wall Street Journal	Jun 8–11, 2007	Hillary Clinton	48%	Rudy Giuliani	43%	1,008 A	±3.1%
NBC News/Wall Street Journal	Jun 8–11, 2007	Barack Obama	50%	Fred Thompson	31%	1,008 A	±3.1%
Quinnipiac University	Jun 5–11, 2007	Hillary Clinton	45%	Rudy Giuliani	44%	1,711 RV	±2.4%
Quinnipiac University	Jun 5–11, 2007	Hillary Clinton	44%	John McCain	42%	1,711 RV	±2.4%
Quinnipiac University	Jun 5–11, 2007	Hillary Clinton	46%	Fred Thompson	39%	1,711 RV	±2.4%
Quinnipiac University	Jun 5–11, 2007	Barack Obama	42%	Rudy Giuliani	42%	1,711 RV	±2.4%
Quinnipiac University	Jun 5–11, 2007	Barack Obama	43%	John McCain	41%	1,711 RV	±2.4%
Quinnipiac University	Jun 5–11, 2007	Barack Obama	46%	Fred Thompson	34%	1,711 RV	±2.4%
Quinnipiac University	Jun 5–11, 2007	Al Gore	45%	Rudy Giuliani	43%	1,711 RV	±2.4%
Quinnipiac University	Jun 5–11, 2007	Al Gore	44%	John McCain	41%	1,711 RV	±2.4%
Quinnipiac University	Jun 5–11, 2007	Al Gore	49%	Fred Thompson	37%	1,711 RV	±2.4%
Los Angeles Times/Bloomberg	Jun 7–10, 2007	Hillary Clinton	41%	John McCain	45%	513 RV	±4%
Los Angeles Times/Bloomberg	Jun 7–10, 2007	Hillary Clinton	39%	Rudy Giuliani	49%	513 RV	±4%
Los Angeles Times/Bloomberg	Jun 7–10, 2007	Hillary Clinton	41%	Mitt Romney	43%	513 RV	±4%
Los Angeles Times/Bloomberg	Jun 7–10, 2007	John Edwards	40%	John McCain	45%	513 RV	±4%
Los Angeles Times/Bloomberg	Jun 7–10, 2007	John Edwards	46%	Mitt Romney	32%	513 RV	±4%
Los Angeles Times/Bloomberg	Jun 7–10, 2007	Barack Obama	46%	Rudy Giuliani	41%	543 RV	±4%
Los Angeles Times/Bloomberg	Jun 7–10, 2007	Barack Obama	47%	John McCain	35%	543 RV	±4%
Los Angeles Times/Bloomberg	Jun 7–10, 2007	Barack Obama	50%	Mitt Romney	34%	543 RV	±4%
Los Angeles Times/Bloomberg	Jun 7–10, 2007	John Edwards	46%	Rudy Giuliani	43%	543 RV	±4%
Rasmussen Reports/Pulse Opinion Research	Jun 6–7, 2007	John Edwards	47%	Rudy Giuliani	43%	800 LV	±4%
Rasmussen Reports/Pulse Opinion Research	Jun 6–7, 2007	John Edwards	51%	Fred Thompson	38%	800 LV	±4%
FOX News/Opinion Dynamics Poll	Jun 5–6, 2007	Hillary Clinton	42%	Rudy Giuliani	45%	900 RV	±3%
FOX News/Opinion Dynamics Poll	Jun 5–6, 2007	Hillary Clinton	43%	John McCain	43%	900 RV	±3%
FOX News/Opinion Dynamics Poll	Jun 5–6, 2007	Hillary Clinton	48%	Fred Thompson	38%	900 RV	±3%
FOX News/Opinion Dynamics Poll	Jun 5–6, 2007	Hillary Clinton	46%	Mitt Romney	36%	900 RV	±3%
FOX News/Opinion Dynamics Poll	Jun 5–6, 2007	Barack Obama	41%	Rudy Giuliani	46%	900 RV	±3%
FOX News/Opinion Dynamics Poll	Jun 5–6, 2007	Barack Obama	47%	Fred Thompson	34%	900 RV	±3%
Rasmussen Reports/Pulse Opinion Research	Jun 4–5, 2007	Barack Obama	39%	Rudy Giuliani	51%	800 LV	±4%
Rasmussen Reports/Pulse Opinion Research	Jun 4–5, 2007	Barack Obama	47%	Fred Thompson	44%	800 LV	±4%
USA Today/Gallup	Jun 1–3, 2007	Hillary Clinton	45%	Rudy Giuliani	52%	1,004 A	±3%
Rasmussen Reports/Pulse Opinion Research	May 30–31, 2007	Hillary Clinton	44%	Rudy Giuliani	47%	800 LV	±4%
Rasmussen Reports/Pulse Opinion Research	May 30–31, 2007	Hillary Clinton	42%	John McCain	48%	800 LV	±4%
Rasmussen Reports/Pulse Opinion Research	May 29, 2007	Bill Richardson	39%	Rudy Giuliani	43%	800 LV	±4%
Rasmussen Reports/Pulse Opinion Research	May 29, 2007	Bill Richardson	38%	John McCain	43%	800 LV	±4%
Rasmussen Reports/Pulse Opinion Research	May 21–22, 2007	Hillary Clinton	48%	Mike Huckabee	43%	800 LV	±4%
Rasmussen Reports/Pulse Opinion Research	May 21–22, 2007	Hillary Clinton	49%	Sam Brownback	41%	800 LV	±4%
Zogby International	May 17–20, 2007	Hillary Clinton	43%	Rudy Giuliani	48%	993 LV	±3.2%
Zogby International	May 17–20, 2007	Hillary Clinton	43%	John McCain	47%	993 LV	±3.2%
Zogby International	May 17–20, 2007	Hillary Clinton	48%	Fred Thompson	41%	993 LV	±3.2%
Zogby International	May 17–20, 2007	Hillary Clinton	48%	Mitt Romney	40%	993 LV	±3.2%
Zogby International	May 17–20, 2007	Barack Obama	48%	Rudy Giuliani	42%	993 LV	±3.2%
Zogby International	May 17–20, 2007	Barack Obama	46%	John McCain	43%	993 LV	±3.2%
Zogby International	May 17–20, 2007	Barack Obama	52%	Fred Thompson	35%	993 LV	±3.2%
Zogby International	May 17–20, 2007	Barack Obama	52%	Mitt Romney	35%	993 LV	±3.2%
Zogby International	May 17–20, 2007	John Edwards	43%	Rudy Giuliani	47%	993 LV	±3.2%
Zogby International	May 17–20, 2007	John Edwards	41%	John McCain	46%	993 LV	±3.2%
Zogby International	May 17–20, 2007	John Edwards	48%	Fred Thompson	40%	993 LV	±3.2%
Zogby International	May 17–20, 2007	John Edwards	50%	Mitt Romney	36%	993 LV	±3.2%
Zogby International	May 17–20, 2007	Bill Richardson	35%	Rudy Giuliani	50%	993 LV	±3.2%
Zogby International	May 17–20, 2007	Bill Richardson	31%	John McCain	52%	993 LV	±3.2%
Zogby International	May 17–20, 2007	Bill Richardson	39%	Fred Thompson	40%	993 LV	±3.2%
Zogby International	May 17–20, 2007	Bill Richardson	40%	Mitt Romney	37%	993 LV	±3.2%
Diageo/The Hotline/Financial Dynamics	May 16–20, 2007	Hillary Clinton	43%	Rudy Giuliani	45%	800 RV	±3.5%
Diageo/The Hotline/Financial Dynamics	May 16–20, 2007	Hillary Clinton	45%	John McCain	43%	800 RV	±3.5%
Diageo/The Hotline/Financial Dynamics	May 16–20, 2007	Barack Obama	43%	Rudy Giuliani	41%	800 RV	±3.5%
Diageo/The Hotline/Financial Dynamics	May 16–20, 2007	Barack Obama	42%	John McCain	39%	800 RV	±3.5%
Diageo/The Hotline/Financial Dynamics	May 16–20, 2007	John Edwards	42%	Rudy Giuliani	43%	800 RV	±3.5%
Diageo/The Hotline/Financial Dynamics	May 16–20, 2007	John Edwards	44%	John McCain	39%	800 RV	±3.5%
Rasmussen Reports/Pulse Opinion Research	May 16–17, 2007	John Edwards	53%	Fred Thompson	32%	800 LV	±4%
Rasmussen Reports/Pulse Opinion Research	May 16–17, 2007	John Edwards	54%	Mitt Romney	33%	800 LV	±4%
Rasmussen Reports/Pulse Opinion Research	May 14–15, 2007	Barack Obama	49%	Fred Thompson	42%	800 LV	±4%
Rasmussen Reports/Pulse Opinion Research	May 14–15, 2007	Barack Obama	49%	Mitt Romney	37%	800 LV	±4%
Rasmussen Reports/Pulse Opinion Research	May 9–10, 2007	Hillary Clinton	47%	Fred Thompson	44%	800 LV	±4%
Rasmussen Reports/Pulse Opinion Research	May 9–10, 2007	Hillary Clinton	47%	Mitt Romney	44%	800 LV	±4%
Rasmussen Reports/Pulse Opinion Research	May 7–8, 2007	John Edwards	47%	Rudy Giuliani	45%	800 LV	±4%
Rasmussen Reports/Pulse Opinion Research	May 7–8, 2007	John Edwards	48%	John McCain	41%	800 LV	±4%
Newsweek/Princeton Survey Research Associates International	May 2–3, 2007	Hillary Clinton	49%	Rudy Giuliani	46%	831 RV	±4%
Newsweek/Princeton Survey Research Associates International	May 2–3, 2007	Hillary Clinton	50%	John McCain	44%	831 RV	±4%
Newsweek/Princeton Survey Research Associates International	May 2–3, 2007	Hillary Clinton	57%	Mitt Romney	35%	831 RV	±4%
Newsweek/Princeton Survey Research Associates International	May 2–3, 2007	Barack Obama	50%	Rudy Giuliani	43%	831 RV	±4%
Newsweek/Princeton Survey Research Associates International	May 2–3, 2007	Barack Obama	52%	John McCain	39%	831 RV	±4%
Newsweek/Princeton Survey Research Associates International	May 2–3, 2007	Barack Obama	58%	Mitt Romney	29%	831 RV	±4%
Newsweek/Princeton Survey Research Associates International	May 2–3, 2007	John Edwards	50%	Rudy Giuliani	44%	831 RV	±4%
Newsweek/Princeton Survey Research Associates International	May 2–3, 2007	John Edwards	52%	John McCain	42%	831 RV	±4%
Newsweek/Princeton Survey Research Associates International	May 2–3, 2007	John Edwards	64%	Mitt Romney	27%	831 RV	±4%
Rasmussen Reports/Pulse Opinion Research	Apr 30 – May 1, 2007	Hillary Clinton	45%	Rudy Giuliani	45%	800 LV	±4%
Rasmussen Reports/Pulse Opinion Research	Apr 30 – May 1, 2007	Hillary Clinton	48%	John McCain	44%	800 LV	±4%
WNBC/Marist College	Apr 26 – May 1, 2007	Hillary Clinton	48%	Rudy Giuliani	43%	822 RV	±3.5%
WNBC/Marist College	Apr 26 – May 1, 2007	Hillary Clinton	47%	John McCain	42%	822 RV	±3.5%
WNBC/Marist College	Apr 26 – May 1, 2007	Barack Obama	41%	Rudy Giuliani	43%	822 RV	±3.5%
WNBC/Marist College	Apr 26 – May 1, 2007	John Edwards	49%	Rudy Giuliani	43%	822 RV	±3.5%
WNBC/Marist College	Apr 26 – May 1, 2007	Barack Obama	39%	John McCain	46%	822 RV	±3.5%
WNBC/Marist College	Apr 26 – May 1, 2007	John Edwards	49%	John McCain	39%	822 RV	±3.5%
Quinnipiac University	Apr 25 – May 1, 2007	Hillary Clinton	40%	Rudy Giuliani	49%	1,166 RV	±2.9%
Quinnipiac University	Apr 25 – May 1, 2007	Barack Obama	41%	Rudy Giuliani	44%	1,166 RV	±2.9%
Quinnipiac University	Apr 25 – May 1, 2007	Al Gore	41%	Rudy Giuliani	48%	1,166 RV	±2.9%
Quinnipiac University	Apr 25 – May 1, 2007	Hillary Clinton	41%	John McCain	46%	1,166 RV	±2.9%
Quinnipiac University	Apr 25 – May 1, 2007	Barack Obama	42%	John McCain	42%	1,166 RV	±2.9%
Quinnipiac University	Apr 25 – May 1, 2007	Al Gore	41%	John McCain	47%	1,166 RV	±2.9%
Quinnipiac University	Apr 25 – May 1, 2007	Hillary Clinton	46%	Fred Thompson	39%	1,166 RV	±2.9%
Quinnipiac University	Apr 25 – May 1, 2007	Barack Obama	47%	Fred Thompson	34%	1,166 RV	±2.9%
Quinnipiac University	Apr 25 – May 1, 2007	Al Gore	47%	Fred Thompson	37%	1,166 RV	±2.9%
Diageo/The Hotline/Financial Dynamics	Apr 26–30, 2007	Hillary Clinton	41%	Rudy Giuliani	44%	801 RV	±3.5%
Diageo/The Hotline/Financial Dynamics	Apr 26–30, 2007	Hillary Clinton	42%	John McCain	43%	801 RV	±3.5%
Diageo/The Hotline/Financial Dynamics	Apr 26–30, 2007	Hillary Clinton	47%	Mitt Romney	33%	801 RV	±3.5%
Diageo/The Hotline/Financial Dynamics	Apr 26–30, 2007	Barack Obama	45%	Rudy Giuliani	36%	801 RV	±3.5%
Diageo/The Hotline/Financial Dynamics	Apr 26–30, 2007	Barack Obama	46%	John McCain	34%	801 RV	±3.5%
Diageo/The Hotline/Financial Dynamics	Apr 26–30, 2007	Barack Obama	50%	Mitt Romney	23%	801 RV	±3.5%
Diageo/The Hotline/Financial Dynamics	Apr 26–30, 2007	John Edwards	44%	Rudy Giuliani	38%	801 RV	±3.5%
Diageo/The Hotline/Financial Dynamics	Apr 26–30, 2007	John Edwards	45%	John McCain	36%	801 RV	±3.5%
Diageo/The Hotline/Financial Dynamics	Apr 26–30, 2007	John Edwards	49%	Mitt Romney	24%	801 RV	±3.5%
NBC News/Wall Street Journal	Apr 20–23, 2007	Barack Obama	45%	John McCain	39%	1,004 A	±3.1%
Rasmussen Reports/Pulse Opinion Research	Apr 18–19, 2007	Barack Obama	43%	Rudy Giuliani	46%	800 LV	±4%
Rasmussen Reports/Pulse Opinion Research	Apr 18–19, 2007	Barack Obama	47%	Fred Thompson	37%	800 LV	±4%
Rasmussen Reports/Pulse Opinion Research	Apr 11–12, 2007	Bill Richardson	34%	Rudy Giuliani	51%	800 LV	±4%
Rasmussen Reports/Pulse Opinion Research	Apr 11–12, 2007	Bill Richardson	42%	Mitt Romney	34%	800 LV	±4%
Rasmussen Reports/Pulse Opinion Research	Apr 9–10, 2007	Barack Obama	48%	John McCain	42%	800 LV	±4%
Rasmussen Reports/Pulse Opinion Research	Apr 9–10, 2007	Barack Obama	52%	Mitt Romney	37%	800 LV	±4%
Time/Schulman, Ronca, & Bucuvalas Inc. (SRBI)	April 5–9, 2007	Hillary Clinton	43%	Rudy Giuliani	48%	1,102 RV	±3%
Time/Schulman, Ronca, & Bucuvalas Inc. (SRBI)	April 5–9, 2007	Barack Obama	45%	Rudy Giuliani	45%	1,102 RV	±3%
Time/Schulman, Ronca, & Bucuvalas Inc. (SRBI)	April 5–9, 2007	Hillary Clinton	49%	Mitt Romney	37%	1,102 RV	±3%
Time/Schulman, Ronca, & Bucuvalas Inc. (SRBI)	April 5–9, 2007	Barack Obama	54%	Mitt Romney	31%	1,102 RV	±3%
Time/Schulman, Ronca, & Bucuvalas Inc. (SRBI)	April 5–9, 2007	Hillary Clinton	44%	John McCain	46%	1,102 RV	±3%
Time/Schulman, Ronca, & Bucuvalas Inc. (SRBI)	April 5–9, 2007	Barack Obama	47%	John McCain	42%	1,102 RV	±3%
Los Angeles Times/Bloomberg	April 5−9, 2007	Barack Obama	48%	John McCain	40%	603 RV	±4%
Los Angeles Times/Bloomberg	April 5−9, 2007	Hillary Clinton	45%	John McCain	42%	603 RV	±4%
Los Angeles Times/Bloomberg	April 5−9, 2007	Hillary Clinton	42%	Rudy Giuliani	48%	603 RV	±4%
Los Angeles Times/Bloomberg	April 5−9, 2007	Barack Obama	46%	Rudy Giuliani	42%	603 RV	±4%
Rasmussen Reports/Pulse Opinion Research	Apr 4–5, 2007	John Edwards	49%	Rudy Giuliani	43%	800 LV	±4%
Rasmussen Reports/Pulse Opinion Research	Apr 4–5, 2007	John Edwards	50%	Fred Thompson	36%	800 LV	±4%
Rasmussen Reports/Pulse Opinion Research	Apr 2–3, 2007	Hillary Clinton	47%	Rudy Giuliani	48%	800 LV	±4%
Rasmussen Reports/Pulse Opinion Research	Apr 2–3, 2007	Hillary Clinton	47%	John McCain	46%	800 LV	±4%
Rasmussen Reports/Pulse Opinion Research	Mar 28–29, 2007	Barack Obama	43%	Rudy Giuliani	44%	800 LV	±4%
Rasmussen Reports/Pulse Opinion Research	Mar 28–29, 2007	Barack Obama	52%	Mike Huckabee	32%	800 LV	±4%
Rasmussen Reports/Pulse Opinion Research	Mar 26–27, 2007	John Edwards	47%	John McCain	38%	800 LV	±4%
Rasmussen Reports/Pulse Opinion Research	Mar 26–27, 2007	John Edwards	55%	Mitt Romney	29%	800 LV	±4%
Time/Schulman, Ronca, & Bucuvalas Inc. (SRBI)	March 23–26, 2007	Hillary Clinton	41%	Rudy Giuliani	50%	1,102 RV	±3%
Time/Schulman, Ronca, & Bucuvalas Inc. (SRBI)	March 23–26, 2007	Barack Obama	44%	Rudy Giuliani	45%	1,102 RV	±3%
Time/Schulman, Ronca, & Bucuvalas Inc. (SRBI)	March 23–26, 2007	Hillary Clinton	42%	John McCain	48%	1,102 RV	±3%
Time/Schulman, Ronca, & Bucuvalas Inc. (SRBI)	March 23–26, 2007	Barack Obama	43%	John McCain	45%	1,102 RV	±3%
Time/Schulman, Ronca, & Bucuvalas Inc. (SRBI)	March 23–26, 2007	Hillary Clinton	51%	Mitt Romney	34%	1,102 RV	±3%
Time/Schulman, Ronca, & Bucuvalas Inc. (SRBI)	March 23–26, 2007	Barack Obama	53%	Mitt Romney	29%	1,102 RV	±3%
McLaughlin & Associates	March 21–25, 2007	Hillary Clinton	40%	Rudy Giuliani	42%	1,000 LV	±3.1%
McLaughlin & Associates	March 21–25, 2007	Hillary Clinton	38%	John McCain	44%	1,000 LV	±3.1%
McLaughlin & Associates	March 21–25, 2007	Barack Obama	38%	Rudy Giuliani	40%	1,000 LV	±3.1%
McLaughlin & Associates	March 21–25, 2007	Barack Obama	39%	John McCain	38%	1,000 LV	±3.1%
Democracy Corps/Greenberg Quinlan Rosner (D)	March 20–25, 2007	Hillary Clinton	46%	John McCain	48%	763 LV	Not reported
Democracy Corps/Greenberg Quinlan Rosner (D)	March 20–25, 2007	Barack Obama	50%	John McCain	44%	763 LV	Not reported
Rasmussen Reports/Pulse Opinion Research	Mar 21–22, 2007	Hillary Clinton	43%	Fred Thompson	44%	800 LV	±4%
Rasmussen Reports/Pulse Opinion Research	Mar 21–22, 2007	Barack Obama	49%	Fred Thompson	37%	800 LV	±4%
Time/Schulman, Ronca, & Bucuvalas Inc. (SRBI)	Mar 9–12, 2007	Hillary Clinton	43%	Rudy Giuliani	47%	1,500 RV	±3%
Time/Schulman, Ronca, & Bucuvalas Inc. (SRBI)	Mar 9–12, 2007	Hillary Clinton	44%	John McCain	43%	1,500 RV	±3%
Time/Schulman, Ronca, & Bucuvalas Inc. (SRBI)	Mar 9–12, 2007	Barack Obama	44%	Rudy Giuliani	43%	1,500 RV	±3%
Time/Schulman, Ronca, & Bucuvalas Inc. (SRBI)	Mar 9–12, 2007	Barack Obama	44%	John McCain	41%	1,500 RV	±3%
American Research Group	Mar 2–5, 2007	Hillary Clinton	42%	Rudy Giuliani	48%	2,104 LV	±2.2%
American Research Group	Mar 2–5, 2007	Barack Obama	41%	Rudy Giuliani	46%	2,104 LV	±2.2%
American Research Group	Mar 2–5, 2007	Hillary Clinton	42%	John McCain	45%	2,104 LV	±2.2%
American Research Group	Mar 2–5, 2007	Barack Obama	42%	John McCain	46%	2,104 LV	±2.2%
Newsweek/Princeton Survey Research Associates International	Feb 28 – Mar 1, 2007	Hillary Clinton	46%	Rudy Giuliani	47%	1,202 RV	±3%
Newsweek/Princeton Survey Research Associates International	Feb 28 – Mar 1, 2007	Barack Obama	43%	Rudy Giuliani	48%	1,202 RV	±3%
Newsweek/Princeton Survey Research Associates International	Feb 28 – Mar 1, 2007	John Edwards	45%	Rudy Giuliani	47%	1,202 RV	±3%
Newsweek/Princeton Survey Research Associates International	Feb 28 – Mar 1, 2007	Hillary Clinton	47%	John McCain	46%	1,202 RV	±3%
Newsweek/Princeton Survey Research Associates International	Feb 28 – Mar 1, 2007	Barack Obama	45%	John McCain	43%	1,202 RV	±3%
Newsweek/Princeton Survey Research Associates International	Feb 28 – Mar 1, 2007	John Edwards	48%	John McCain	43%	1,202 RV	±3%
Newsweek/Princeton Survey Research Associates International	Feb 28 – Mar 1, 2007	Hillary Clinton	53%	Mitt Romney	38%	1,202 RV	±3%
Newsweek/Princeton Survey Research Associates International	Feb 28 – Mar 1, 2007	Barack Obama	54%	Mitt Romney	34%	1,202 RV	±3%
Newsweek/Princeton Survey Research Associates International	Feb 28 – Mar 1, 2007	John Edwards	58%	Mitt Romney	30%	1,202 RV	±3%
Time/Schulman, Ronca, & Bucuvalas Inc. (SRBI)	Feb 23–26, 2007	Hillary Clinton	44%	Rudy Giuliani	47%	1,144 RV	±3%
Time/Schulman, Ronca, & Bucuvalas Inc. (SRBI)	Feb 23–26, 2007	Hillary Clinton	46%	John McCain	45%	1,144 RV	±3%
Time/Schulman, Ronca, & Bucuvalas Inc. (SRBI)	Feb 23–26, 2007	Barack Obama	42%	Rudy Giuliani	47%	1,144 RV	±3%
Time/Schulman, Ronca, & Bucuvalas Inc. (SRBI)	Feb 23–26, 2007	Barack Obama	46%	John McCain	42%	1,144 RV	±3%
Zogby International	Feb 22–24, 2007	Hillary Clinton	40%	Rudy Giuliani	47%	1,078 LV	±3%
Zogby International	Feb 22–24, 2007	Hillary Clinton	39%	John McCain	47%	1,078 LV	±3%
Zogby International	Feb 22–24, 2007	Hillary Clinton	45%	Mitt Romney	35%	1,078 LV	±3%
Zogby International	Feb 22–24, 2007	Barack Obama	46%	Rudy Giuliani	40%	1,078 LV	±3%
Zogby International	Feb 22–24, 2007	Barack Obama	44%	John McCain	40%	1,078 LV	±3%
Zogby International	Feb 22–24, 2007	Barack Obama	51%	Mitt Romney	29%	1,078 LV	±3%
Zogby International	Feb 22–24, 2007	John Edwards	40%	Rudy Giuliani	46%	1,078 LV	±3%
Zogby International	Feb 22–24, 2007	John Edwards	38%	John McCain	47%	1,078 LV	±3%
Zogby International	Feb 22–24, 2007	John Edwards	47%	Mitt Romney	32%	1,078 LV	±3%
Democracy Corps/Greenberg Quinlan Rosner (D)	February 19, 2007	Hillary Clinton	44%	John McCain	46%	1,014 LV	Not reported
Quinnipiac University	Feb 13–19, 2007	Hillary Clinton	43%	Rudy Giuliani	48%	1,536 RV	±2.5%
Quinnipiac University	Feb 13–19, 2007	Hillary Clinton	44%	John McCain	46%	1,536 RV	±2.5%
Quinnipiac University	Feb 13–19, 2007	Hillary Clinton	49%	Mitt Romney	37%	1,536 RV	±2.5%
Quinnipiac University	Feb 13–19, 2007	Barack Obama	40%	Rudy Giuliani	47%	1,536 RV	±2.5%
Quinnipiac University	Feb 13–19, 2007	Barack Obama	43%	John McCain	43%	1,536 RV	±2.5%
Quinnipiac University	Feb 13–19, 2007	Barack Obama	49%	Mitt Romney	29%	1,536 RV	±2.5%
Quinnipiac University	Feb 13–19, 2007	John Edwards	40%	Rudy Giuliani	48%	1,536 RV	±2.5%
Quinnipiac University	Feb 13–19, 2007	John Edwards	42%	John McCain	43%	1,536 RV	±2.5%
Quinnipiac University	Feb 13–19, 2007	John Edwards	48%	Mitt Romney	32%	1,536 RV	±2.5%
Rasmussen Reports/Pulse Opinion Research	Feb 14–15, 2007	Hillary Clinton	48%	Chuck Hagel	40%	800 LV	±4%
Rasmussen Reports/Pulse Opinion Research	Feb 14–15, 2007	Barack Obama	50%	Chuck Hagel	34%	800 LV	±4%
WNBC/Marist College	Feb 12–15, 2007	Hillary Clinton	45%	Rudy Giuliani	47%	978 RV	±3.5%
WNBC/Marist College	Feb 12–15, 2007	Barack Obama	41%	Rudy Giuliani	45%	978 RV	±3.5%
WNBC/Marist College	Feb 12–15, 2007	John Edwards	44%	Rudy Giuliani	44%	978 RV	±3.5%
WNBC/Marist College	Feb 12–15, 2007	Hillary Clinton	46%	John McCain	46%	978 RV	±3.5%
WNBC/Marist College	Feb 12–15, 2007	Barack Obama	41%	John McCain	44%	978 RV	±3.5%
WNBC/Marist College	Feb 12–15, 2007	John Edwards	43%	John McCain	44%	978 RV	±3.5%
WNBC/Marist College	Feb 12–15, 2007	Hillary Clinton	49%	Mitt Romney	36%	978 RV	±3.5%
WNBC/Marist College	Feb 12–15, 2007	Hillary Clinton	56%	Newt Gingrich	36%	978 RV	±3.5%
Fox News/Opinion Dynamics Corporation	Feb 13–14, 2007	Hillary Clinton	40%	Rudy Giuliani	49%	900 RV	±3%
Fox News/Opinion Dynamics Corporation	Feb 13–14, 2007	Barack Obama	39%	Rudy Giuliani	45%	900 RV	±3%
USA Today/Gallup	Feb 9–11, 2007	Hillary Clinton	50%	John McCain	47%	1,006 A	±3%
USA Today/Gallup	Feb 9–11, 2007	Hillary Clinton	48%	Rudy Giuliani	50%	1,006 A	±3%
USA Today/Gallup	Feb 9–11, 2007	Barack Obama	48%	John McCain	48%	1,006 A	±3%
USA Today/Gallup	Feb 9–11, 2007	Barack Obama	43%	Rudy Giuliani	52%	1,006 A	±3%
Times Union/Siena College	Feb 6–9, 2007	Hillary Clinton	45%	John McCain	44%	1,120 RV	±2.9%
Times Union/Siena College	Feb 6–9, 2007	Hillary Clinton	44%	Rudy Giuliani	45%	1,120 RV	±2.9%
Democracy Corps/Greenberg Quinlan Rosner (D)	January 28, 2007	Hillary Clinton	47%	John McCain	48%	1,002 LV	Not reported
Newsweek/Princeton Survey Research Associates International	Jan 24–25, 2007	Hillary Clinton	50%	John McCain	44%	837 RV	±4%
Newsweek/Princeton Survey Research Associates International	Jan 24–25, 2007	Barack Obama	48%	John McCain	42%	837 RV	±4%
Newsweek/Princeton Survey Research Associates International	Jan 24–25, 2007	John Edwards	48%	John McCain	44%	837 RV	±4%
Newsweek/Princeton Survey Research Associates International	Jan 24–25, 2007	Hillary Clinton	49%	Rudy Giuliani	46%	837 RV	±4%
Newsweek/Princeton Survey Research Associates International	Jan 24–25, 2007	Barack Obama	47%	Rudy Giuliani	44%	837 RV	±4%
Newsweek/Princeton Survey Research Associates International	Jan 24–25, 2007	John Edwards	46%	Rudy Giuliani	47%	837 RV	±4%
Newsweek/Princeton Survey Research Associates International	Jan 24–25, 2007	Hillary Clinton	56%	Mitt Romney	37%	837 RV	±4%
Newsweek/Princeton Survey Research Associates International	Jan 24–25, 2007	Barack Obama	56%	Mitt Romney	30%	837 RV	±4%
Newsweek/Princeton Survey Research Associates International	Jan 24–25, 2007	John Edwards	60%	Mitt Romney	26%	837 RV	±4%
Rasmussen Reports/Pulse Opinion Research	Jan 22–23, 2007	Bill Richardson	34%	Rudy Giuliani	49%	800 LV	±4%
Rasmussen Reports/Pulse Opinion Research	Jan 22–23, 2007	Bill Richardson	39%	John McCain	43%	800 LV	±4%
Time/Schulman, Ronca, & Bucuvalas, Inc. (SRBI)	Jan 22–23, 2007	Hillary Clinton	47%	John McCain	47%	1,064 RV	±3%
Time/Schulman, Ronca, & Bucuvalas, Inc. (SRBI)	Jan 22–23, 2007	Barack Obama	42%	John McCain	49%	1,064 RV	±3%
Time/Schulman, Ronca, & Bucuvalas, Inc. (SRBI)	Jan 22–23, 2007	John Edwards	42%	John McCain	49%	1,064 RV	±3%
Cook Political Report/RT Strategies	Jan 18–21, 2007	Hillary Clinton	42%	John McCain	48%	872 RV	±3.3%
ABC News/Washington Post	Jan 16–19, 2007	Hillary Clinton	50%	John McCain	45%	1,000 A	±3%
ABC News/Washington Post	Jan 16–19, 2007	Barack Obama	47%	John McCain	45%	1,000 A	±3%
ABC News/Washington Post	Jan 16–19, 2007	Barack Obama	45%	Rudy Giuliani	49%	1,000 A	±3%
ABC News/Washington Post	Jan 16–19, 2007	Hillary Clinton	49%	Rudy Giuliani	47%	1,000 A	±3%
Rasmussen Reports/Pulse Opinion Research	Jan 17–18, 2007	Barack Obama	47%	John McCain	44%	800 LV	±4%
Rasmussen Reports/Pulse Opinion Research	Jan 17–18, 2007	John Edwards	46%	John McCain	43%	800 LV	±4%
Newsweek/Princeton Survey Research Associates International	Jan 17–18, 2007	Hillary Clinton	48%	John McCain	47%	896 RV	±4%
Newsweek/Princeton Survey Research Associates International	Jan 17–18, 2007	Barack Obama	46%	John McCain	44%	896 RV	±4%
Newsweek/Princeton Survey Research Associates International	Jan 17–18, 2007	John Edwards	48%	John McCain	43%	896 RV	±4%
Newsweek/Princeton Survey Research Associates International	Jan 17–18, 2007	Hillary Clinton	47%	Rudy Giuliani	48%	896 RV	±4%
Newsweek/Princeton Survey Research Associates International	Jan 17–18, 2007	Barack Obama	45%	Rudy Giuliani	47%	896 RV	±4%
Newsweek/Princeton Survey Research Associates International	Jan 17–18, 2007	John Edwards	48%	Rudy Giuliani	45%	896 RV	±4%
Democracy Corps/Greenberg Quinlan Rosner (D)	January 16, 2007	Hillary Clinton	44%	John McCain	49%	1,000 LV	Not reported
Diageo/The Hotline/Financial Dynamics	Jan 11–14, 2007	Hillary Clinton	39%	John McCain	48%	800 RV	±3.5%
Diageo/The Hotline/Financial Dynamics	Jan 11–14, 2007	Barack Obama	38%	John McCain	43%	800 RV	±3.5%
Diageo/The Hotline/Financial Dynamics	Jan 11–14, 2007	John Edwards	35%	John McCain	45%	800 RV	±3.5%
Diageo/The Hotline/Financial Dynamics	Jan 11–14, 2007	Hillary Clinton	40%	Rudy Giuliani	48%	800 RV	±3.5%
Diageo/The Hotline/Financial Dynamics	Jan 11–14, 2007	Barack Obama	38%	Rudy Giuliani	41%	800 RV	±3.5%
Diageo/The Hotline/Financial Dynamics	Jan 11–14, 2007	John Edwards	41%	Rudy Giuliani	40%	800 RV	±3.5%
George Washington University Battleground Poll	Jan 8–11, 2007	Hillary Clinton	43%	Rudy Giuliani	53%	1,000 LV	±3.1%
George Washington University Battleground Poll	Jan 8–11, 2007	Hillary Clinton	43%	John McCain	53%	1,000 LV	±3.1%
George Washington University Battleground Poll	Jan 8–11, 2007	Barack Obama	41%	Rudy Giuliani	50%	1,000 LV	±3.1%
George Washington University Battleground Poll	Jan 8–11, 2007	Barack Obama	39%	John McCain	51%	1,000 LV	±3.1%
Investor's Business Daily/TIPP	Jan 2–4, 2007	Hillary Clinton	43%	Rudy Giuliani	48%	951 A	±3%
Investor's Business Daily/TIPP	Jan 2–4, 2007	Barack Obama	36%	Rudy Giuliani	49%	951 A	±3%
Investor's Business Daily/TIPP	Jan 2–4, 2007	John Edwards	42%	Rudy Giuliani	47%	951 A	±3%
Investor's Business Daily/TIPP	Jan 2–4, 2007	Hillary Clinton	41%	John McCain	48%	951 A	±3%
Investor's Business Daily/TIPP	Jan 2–4, 2007	Barack Obama	36%	John McCain	48%	951 A	±3%
Investor's Business Daily/TIPP	Jan 2–4, 2007	John Edwards	43%	John McCain	44%	951 A	±3%
Investor's Business Daily/TIPP	Jan 2–4, 2007	Hillary Clinton	48%	Mitt Romney	35%	951 A	±3%
Investor's Business Daily/TIPP	Jan 2–4, 2007	Barack Obama	43%	Mitt Romney	31%	951 A	±3%
Investor's Business Daily/TIPP	Jan 2–4, 2007	John Edwards	53%	Mitt Romney	29%	951 A	±3%
Rasmussen Reports/Pulse Opinion Research	Dec 18–19, 2006	Al Gore	43%	Rudy Giuliani	46%	1,000 LV	±3%
Rasmussen Reports/Pulse Opinion Research	Dec 18–19, 2006	Hillary Clinton	43%	Rudy Giuliani	47%	1,000 LV	±3%
CNN/Opinion Research Corporation	Dec 15–17, 2006	Barack Obama	43%	John McCain	47%	1019	±4.5%
CNN/Opinion Research Corporation	Dec 15–17, 2006	Barack Obama	42%	Rudy Giuliani	49%	1019	±4.5%
CNN/Opinion Research Corporation	Dec 15–17, 2006	Barack Obama	51%	Mitt Romney	35%	1019	±4.5%
CNN/Opinion Research Corporation	Dec 15–17, 2006	Al Gore	47%	John McCain	46%	1019	±4.5%
CNN/Opinion Research Corporation	Dec 15–17, 2006	Al Gore	46%	Rudy Giuliani	46%	1019	±4.5%
CNN/Opinion Research Corporation	Dec 15–17, 2006	Al Gore	53%	Mitt Romney	37%	1019	±4.5%
Rasmussen Reports/Pulse Opinion Research	Dec 14–15, 2006	Hillary Clinton	45%	John McCain	49%	1,000 LV	±3%
Rasmussen Reports/Pulse Opinion Research	Dec 14–15, 2006	Al Gore	44%	John McCain	49%	1,000 LV	±3%
Rasmussen Reports/Pulse Opinion Research	Dec 12–13, 2006	John Edwards	41%	John McCain	46%	1,000 LV	±3%
Rasmussen Reports/Pulse Opinion Research	Dec 12–13, 2006	Barack Obama	40%	John McCain	46%	1,000 LV	±3%
Los Angeles Times/Bloomberg	Dec 8–11, 2006	Hillary Clinton	36%	John McCain	50%	1,555 A	±3%
Los Angeles Times/Bloomberg	Dec 8–11, 2006	Hillary Clinton	42%	Mitt Romney	36%	1,555 A	±3%
NBC News/Wall Street Journal	Dec 8–11, 2006	Hillary Clinton	43%	John McCain	47%	Not reported	±3.3%
NBC News/Wall Street Journal	Dec 8–11, 2006	Barack Obama	38%	John McCain	43%	Not reported	±3.3%
NBC News/Wall Street Journal	Dec 8–11, 2006	John Edwards	43%	John McCain	41%	Not reported	±3.3%
NBC News/Wall Street Journal	Dec 8–11, 2006	Hillary Clinton	47%	Mitt Romney	37%	Not reported	±3.3%
NPR/Public Opinion Strategies/Greenberg Quinlan Rosner	Dec 7, 9–10, 2006	Hillary Clinton	41%	John McCain	48%	800 LV	±3.46%
NPR/Public Opinion Strategies/Greenberg Quinlan Rosner	Dec 7, 9–10, 2006	Barack Obama	43%	Mitt Romney	27%	800 LV	±3.46%
Newsweek/Princeton Survey Research Associates International	Dec 6–7, 2006	Hillary Clinton	50%	John McCain	43%	1,000 A	Not reported
Newsweek/Princeton Survey Research Associates International	Dec 6–7, 2006	Hillary Clinton	48%	Rudy Giuliani	47%	1,000 A	Not reported
Newsweek/Princeton Survey Research Associates International	Dec 6–7, 2006	Hillary Clinton	58%	Mitt Romney	32%	1,000 A	Not reported
Newsweek/Princeton Survey Research Associates International	Dec 6–7, 2006	Barack Obama	43%	John McCain	45%	1,000 A	Not reported
Newsweek/Princeton Survey Research Associates International	Dec 6–7, 2006	Barack Obama	44%	Rudy Giuliani	47%	1,000 A	Not reported
Newsweek/Princeton Survey Research Associates International	Dec 6–7, 2006	Barack Obama	55%	Mitt Romney	25%	1,000 A	Not reported
Fox News/Opinion Dynamics Corporation	Dec 5–6, 2006	Barack Obama	35%	Rudy Giuliani	46%	900 RV	±3%
Fox News/Opinion Dynamics Corporation	Dec 5–6, 2006	Hillary Clinton	39%	Rudy Giuliani	48%	900 RV	±3%
Fox News/Opinion Dynamics Corporation	Dec 5–6, 2006	Barack Obama	30%	John McCain	49%	900 RV	±3%
Fox News/Opinion Dynamics Corporation	Dec 5–6, 2006	Hillary Clinton	40%	John McCain	48%	900 RV	±3%
Rasmussen Reports/Pulse Opinion Research	Dec 4–5, 2006	Barack Obama	47%	Mitt Romney	38%	1,000 LV	±3%
Rasmussen Reports/Pulse Opinion Research	Dec 4–5, 2006	John Edwards	50%	Mitt Romney	37%	1,000 LV	±3%
WNBC/Marist College	Nov 27 – Dec 3, 2006	Hillary Clinton	43%	Rudy Giuliani	49%	967 RV	±3.5%
WNBC/Marist College	Nov 27 – Dec 3, 2006	Hillary Clinton	43%	John McCain	49%	967 RV	±3.5%
WNBC/Marist College	Nov 27 – Dec 3, 2006	Hillary Clinton	47%	Condoleezza Rice	43%	967 RV	±3.5%
Rasmussen Reports/Pulse Opinion Research	Nov 28–29, 2006	Barack Obama	48%	Newt Gingrich	38%	1,000 LV	±3%
Rasmussen Reports/Pulse Opinion Research	Nov 28–29, 2006	Hillary Clinton	50%	Newt Gingrich	41%	1,000 LV	±3%
Rasmussen Reports/Pulse Opinion Research	Nov 13–14, 2006	John Edwards	43%	John McCain	47%	1,000 LV	±3%
Rasmussen Reports/Pulse Opinion Research	Nov 13–14, 2006	John Edwards	41%	Rudy Giuliani	50%	1,000 LV	±3%
Rasmussen Reports/Pulse Opinion Research	Nov 13–14, 2006	John Edwards	50%	Mike Huckabee	33%	1,000 LV	±3%
Rasmussen Reports/Pulse Opinion Research	Nov 13–14, 2006	John Edwards	51%	Mitt Romney	34%	1,000 LV	±3%
Rasmussen Reports/Pulse Opinion Research	Nov 10–11, 2006	Tom Vilsack	32%	John McCain	49%	1,000 LV	±3%
Rasmussen Reports/Pulse Opinion Research	Nov 10–11, 2006	Tom Vilsack	39%	Mitt Romney	35%	1,000 LV	±3%
Diageo/The Hotline/Financial Dynamics	Nov 8–12, 2006	Hillary Clinton	40%	John McCain	45%	1,005 RV	±3.1%
Diageo/The Hotline/Financial Dynamics	Nov 8–12, 2006	John Edwards	35%	John McCain	42%	1,005 RV	±3.1%
Diageo/The Hotline/Financial Dynamics	Nov 8–12, 2006	Barack Obama	35%	John McCain	39%	1,005 RV	±3.1%
Rasmussen Reports/Pulse Opinion Research	Nov 8–9, 2006	Al Gore	41%	John McCain	48%	1,000 LV	±3%
Rasmussen Reports/Pulse Opinion Research	Nov 8–9, 2006	Al Gore	44%	Rudy Giuliani	47%	1,000 LV	±3%
McLaughlin & Associates	Nov 7, 2006	Hillary Clinton	35%	John McCain	51%	1,000 LV	±3.1%
McLaughlin & Associates	Nov 7, 2006	Hillary Clinton	37%	Rudy Giuliani	51%	1,000 LV	±3.1%
Rasmussen Reports/Pulse Opinion Research	Nov 6–7, 2006	Barack Obama	39%	John McCain	47%	1,000 LV	±3%
Rasmussen Reports/Pulse Opinion Research	Nov 6–7, 2006	Barack Obama	39%	Rudy Giuliani	48%	1,000 LV	±3%
Rasmussen Reports/Pulse Opinion Research	Nov 6–7, 2006	Barack Obama	48%	Mitt Romney	33%	1,000 LV	±3%
Rasmussen Reports/Pulse Opinion Research	Nov 6–7, 2006	Barack Obama	50%	Mike Huckabee	31%	1,000 LV	±3%
Rasmussen Reports/Pulse Opinion Research	Nov 6–7, 2006	Hillary Clinton	43%	John McCain	48%	1,000 LV	±3%
Rasmussen Reports/Pulse Opinion Research	Nov 6–7, 2006	Hillary Clinton	46%	Rudy Giuliani	46%	1,000 LV	±3%
CNN/Opinion Research Corporation	Nov 3–5, 2006	Hillary Clinton	47%	John McCain	48%	1,008 A	±3%
CNN/Opinion Research Corporation	Nov 3–5, 2006	Hillary Clinton	47%	Rudy Giuliani	47%	1,008 A	±3%
CNN/Opinion Research Corporation	Nov 3–5, 2006	Barack Obama	40%	John McCain	49%	1,008 A	±3%
CNN/Opinion Research Corporation	Nov 3–5, 2006	Barack Obama	41%	Rudy Giuliani	50%	1,008 A	±3%
CNN/Opinion Research Corporation	Nov 3–5, 2006	John Kerry	37%	John McCain	55%	1,008 A	±3%
CNN/Opinion Research Corporation	Nov 3–5, 2006	John Kerry	40%	Rudy Giuliani	53%	1,008 A	±3%
Fox News/Opinion Dynamics Corporation	Oct 24–25, 2006	Clinton/Obama	40%	McCain/Giuliani	48%	900 LV	±3%
Fox News/Opinion Dynamics Corporation	Oct 24–25, 2006	Barack Obama	38%	John McCain	41%	900 LV	±3%
Fox News/Opinion Dynamics Corporation	Oct 24–25, 2006	Hillary Clinton	39%	John McCain	45%	900 LV	±3%
CNN/Opinion Research Corporation	Oct 13–15, 2006	Hillary Clinton	51%	John McCain	44%	Not reported	±4.5%
CNN/Opinion Research Corporation	Oct 13–15, 2006	Hillary Clinton	48%	Rudy Giuliani	47%	Not reported	±4.5%
CNN/Opinion Research Corporation	Oct 13–15, 2006	Hillary Clinton	47%	John McCain	48%	Not reported	±4.5%
CNN/Opinion Research Corporation	Oct 13–15, 2006	Hillary Clinton	50%	Rudy Giuliani	46%	Not reported	±4.5%
WNBC/Marist College	Sep 18–20, 2006	Hillary Clinton	43%	John McCain	48%	1,018 RV	±3%
WNBC/Marist College	Sep 18–20, 2006	Hillary Clinton	42%	Rudy Giuliani	49%	1,018 RV	±3%
WNBC/Marist College	Sep 18–20, 2006	Hillary Clinton	49%	Condoleezza Rice	43%	1,018 RV	±3%
Fox News/Opinion Dynamics Corporation	Aug 29–30, 2006	Hillary Clinton	39%	John McCain	47%	900 RV	±3%
Fox News/Opinion Dynamics Corporation	Aug 29–30, 2006	Hillary Clinton	42%	Rudy Giuliani	46%	900 RV	±3%
Fox News/Opinion Dynamics Corporation	Aug 29–30, 2006	Al Gore	40%	John McCain	47%	900 RV	±3%
Fox News/Opinion Dynamics Corporation	Aug 29–30, 2006	Al Gore	42%	Rudy Giuliani	46%	900 RV	±3%
Diageo/The Hotline/Financial Dynamics	Jul 20–23, 2006	Hillary Clinton	37%	John McCain	49%	800 RV	±3.5%
Time/Schulman, Ronca, & Bucuvalas Inc. (SRBI)	Jul 13–17, 2006	Hillary Clinton	47%	John McCain	49%	902 RV	Not reported
Time/Schulman, Ronca, & Bucuvalas Inc. (SRBI)	Jul 13–17, 2006	John Kerry	42%	John McCain	52%	902 RV	Not reported
Time/Schulman, Ronca, & Bucuvalas Inc. (SRBI)	Jul 13–17, 2006	Al Gore	43%	John McCain	52%	902 RV	Not reported
Diageo/The Hotline/Financial Dynamics	Jun 21–25, 2006	Hillary Clinton	40%	John McCain	50%	800 RV	±3.5%
Diageo/The Hotline/Financial Dynamics	Jun 21–25, 2006	John Edwards	36%	John McCain	49%	800 RV	±3.5%
Cook Political Report/RT Strategies	Jun 1–4, 2006	Hillary Clinton	40%	John McCain	47%	874 RV	Not reported
Diageo/The Hotline/Financial Dynamics	May 18–21, 2006	Hillary Clinton	38%	John McCain	49%	801 RV	±3.5%
Diageo/The Hotline/Financial Dynamics	May 18–21, 2006	Al Gore	33%	John McCain	51%	801 RV	±3.5%
Fox News/Opinion Dynamics Corporation	May 16–18, 2006	Hillary Clinton	51%	Jeb Bush	35%	900 RV	±3%
Fox News/Opinion Dynamics Corporation	May 16–18, 2006	Hillary Clinton	42%	John McCain	46%	900 RV	±3%
Fox News/Opinion Dynamics Corporation	May 16–18, 2006	Hillary Clinton	40%	Rudy Giuliani	49%	900 RV	±3%
Fox News/Opinion Dynamics Corporation	May 16–18, 2006	Al Gore	50%	Jeb Bush	33%	900 RV	±3%
Fox News/Opinion Dynamics Corporation	May 16–18, 2006	Al Gore	36%	John McCain	48%	900 RV	±3%
Fox News/Opinion Dynamics Corporation	May 16–18, 2006	Al Gore	37%	Rudy Giuliani	50%	900 RV	±3%
NBC News/Wall Street Journal	Apr 21–24, 2006	Hillary Clinton	37%	John McCain	46%	1,005 A	±3.1%
Cook Political Report/RT Strategies	Apr 6–9, 2006	Hillary Clinton	37%	John McCain	46%	Not reported	±3.1%
Fox News/Opinion Dynamics Corporation	Mar 14–15, 2006	Hillary Clinton	39%	John McCain	50%	900 RV	±3%
Fox News/Opinion Dynamics Corporation	Mar 14–15, 2006	John Kerry	33%	John McCain	53%	900 RV	±3%
Fox News/Opinion Dynamics Corporation	Mar 14–15, 2006	Al Gore	34%	John McCain	52%	900 RV	±3%
Fox News/Opinion Dynamics Corporation	Mar 14–15, 2006	Hillary Clinton	39%	Rudy Giuliani	51%	900 RV	±3%
Fox News/Opinion Dynamics Corporation	Mar 14–15, 2006	Hillary Clinton	50%	Dick Cheney	37%	900 RV	±3%
Fox News/Opinion Dynamics Corporation	Mar 14–15, 2006	Al Gore	48%	Dick Cheney	36%	900 RV	±3%
Cook Political Report/RT Strategies	Feb 23–26, 2006	Hillary Clinton	36%	John McCain	48%	Not reported	Not reported
Diageo/The Hotline/Financial Dynamics	Feb 16–19, 2006	Hillary Clinton	40%	John McCain	50%	807 RV	±3.5%
WNBC/Marist College	Feb 13–15, 2006	John Kerry	45%	Rudy Giuliani	48%	931 RV	±3.5%
WNBC/Marist College	Feb 13–15, 2006	John Kerry	37%	John McCain	54%	931 RV	±3.5%
WNBC/Marist College	Feb 13–15, 2006	John Kerry	44%	Condoleezza Rice	50%	931 RV	±3.5%
WNBC/Marist College	Feb 13–15, 2006	John Edwards	44%	Rudy Giuliani	47%	931 RV	±3.5%
WNBC/Marist College	Feb 13–15, 2006	John Edwards	41%	John McCain	47%	931 RV	±3.5%
WNBC/Marist College	Feb 13–15, 2006	John Edwards	51%	Condoleezza Rice	42%	931 RV	±3.5%
WNBC/Marist College	Feb 13–15, 2006	Al Gore	42%	Rudy Giuliani	53%	931 RV	±3.5%
WNBC/Marist College	Feb 13–15, 2006	Al Gore	38%	John McCain	55%	931 RV	±3.5%
WNBC/Marist College	Feb 13–15, 2006	Hillary Clinton	47%	Rudy Giuliani	48%	931 RV	±3.5%
WNBC/Marist College	Feb 13–15, 2006	Hillary Clinton	42%	John McCain	52%	931 RV	±3.5%
WNBC/Marist College	Feb 13–15, 2006	Hillary Clinton	49%	Condoleezza Rice	44%	931 RV	±3.5%
Fox News/Opinion Dynamics Corporation	Feb 7–8, 2006	Hillary Clinton	38%	John McCain	51%	900 RV	±3%
Fox News/Opinion Dynamics Corporation	Feb 7–8, 2006	John Kerry	33%	John McCain	53%	900 RV	±3%
Fox News/Opinion Dynamics Corporation	Feb 7–8, 2006	Hillary Clinton	40%	Rudy Giuliani	51%	900 RV	±3%
Fox News/Opinion Dynamics Corporation	Feb 7–8, 2006	John Kerry	34%	Rudy Giuliani	53%	900 RV	±3%
Diageo/The Hotline/Financial Dynamics	Jan 12–15, 2006	Hillary Clinton	36%	John McCain	52%	806 RV	±3.5%
Zogby Interactive	Dec 6–8, 2005	Hillary Clinton	37%	John McCain	52%	1,013 LV	±3.1%
Zogby Interactive	Dec 6–8, 2005	Hillary Clinton	46%	Condoleezza Rice	47%	1,013 LV	±3.1%
Zogby Interactive	Dec 6–8, 2005	John Kerry	34%	John McCain	55%	1,013 LV	±3.1%
Zogby Interactive	Dec 6–8, 2005	John Kerry	45%	Condoleezza Rice	48%	1,013 LV	±3.1%
Zogby Interactive	Dec 6–8, 2005	Mark Warner	23%	John McCain	58%	1,013 LV	±3.1%
Zogby Interactive	Dec 6–8, 2005	Mark Warner	32%	Condoleezza Rice	50%	1,013 LV	±3.1%
Quinnipiac University	Nov 28 – Dec 4, 2005	Hillary Clinton	40%	John McCain	44%	1,230 RV	±2.8%
Diageo/The Hotline/Financial Dynamics	Nov 11–15, 2005	Hillary Clinton	39%	John McCain	52%	700 RV	±3.7%
NBC News/Wall Street Journal	Nov 4–7, 2005	Hillary Clinton	42%	John McCain	44%	Not reported	Not reported
NBC News/Wall Street Journal	Nov 4–7, 2005	Hillary Clinton	50%	Bill Frist	37%	Not reported	Not reported
NBC News/Wall Street Journal	Nov 4–7, 2005	John Kerry	35%	John McCain	53%	Not reported	Not reported
NBC News/Wall Street Journal	Nov 4–7, 2005	John Kerry	45%	Bill Frist	35%	Not reported	Not reported
WNBC/Marist College	Oct 12–13, 17, 2005	Hillary Clinton	43%	Rudy Giuliani	50%	827 RV	±3.5%
WNBC/Marist College	Oct 12–13, 17, 2005	Hillary Clinton	41%	John McCain	50%	827 RV	±3.5%
WNBC/Marist College	Oct 12–13, 17, 2005	Hillary Clinton	50%	Condoleezza Rice	41%	827 RV	±3.5%
WNBC/Marist College	Oct 12–13, 17, 2005	John Kerry	40%	Rudy Giuliani	53%	827 RV	±3.5%
WNBC/Marist College	Oct 12–13, 17, 2005	John Kerry	40%	John McCain	51%	827 RV	±3.5%
WNBC/Marist College	Oct 12–13, 17, 2005	John Kerry	46%	Condoleezza Rice	45%	827 RV	±3.5%
WNBC/Marist College	Oct 12–13, 17, 2005	John Edwards	43%	Rudy Giuliani	48%	827 RV	±3.5%
WNBC/Marist College	Oct 12–13, 17, 2005	John Edwards	41%	John McCain	49%	827 RV	±3.5%
WNBC/Marist College	Oct 12–13, 17, 2005	John Edwards	49%	Condoleezza Rice	42%	827 RV	±3.5%
Fox News/Opinion Dynamics Corporation	Sep 27–28, 2005	Hillary Clinton	39%	Rudy Giuliani	50%	900 RV	±3%
Fox News/Opinion Dynamics Corporation	Sep 27–28, 2005	Hillary Clinton	38%	John McCain	49%	900 RV	±3%
Fox News/Opinion Dynamics Corporation	Sep 27–28, 2005	Hillary Clinton	46%	Condoleezza Rice	43%	900 RV	±3%
Fox News/Opinion Dynamics Corporation	Sep 27–28, 2005	John Kerry	36%	Rudy Giuliani	52%	900 RV	±3%
Fox News/Opinion Dynamics Corporation	Sep 27–28, 2005	John Kerry	35%	John McCain	53%	900 RV	±3%
Fox News/Opinion Dynamics Corporation	Sep 27–28, 2005	John Kerry	43%	Condoleezza Rice	45%	900 RV	±3%
Fox News/Opinion Dynamics Corporation	Sep 27–28, 2005	Al Gore	29%	John McCain	57%	900 RV	±3%
Fox News/Opinion Dynamics Corporation	Sep 27–28, 2005	Al Gore	32%	Rudy Giuliani	55%	900 RV	±3%
Gallup	July 25–28, 2005	John Kerry	41%	John McCain	54%	922 RV	±4%
Gallup	July 25–28, 2005	John Kerry	41%	Rudy Giuliani	54%	922 RV	±4%
Zogby Interactive	Jun 20–22, 2005	Hillary Clinton	35%	John McCain	54%	1,000 LV	±3.2%
Zogby Interactive	Jun 20–22, 2005	John Kerry	35%	John McCain	55%	1,000 LV	±3.2%
Rasmussen Reports/Pulse Opinion Research	Apr 25–26, 2005	Hillary Clinton	38%	John McCain	45%	1,000 A	±3%
Rasmussen Reports/Pulse Opinion Research	Apr 25–26, 2005	Hillary Clinton	40%	Rudy Giuliani	42%	1,000 A	±3%
Marist College	Apr 18–21, 2005	Hillary Clinton	42%	John McCain	50%	838 RV	±3.5%
Marist College	Apr 18–21, 2005	Hillary Clinton	46%	Rudy Giuliani	47%	838 RV	±3.5%
Marist College	Apr 18–21, 2005	John Kerry	41%	John McCain	51%	838 RV	±3.5%
Marist College	Apr 18–21, 2005	Hillary Clinton	55%	Jeb Bush	38%	838 RV	±3.5%
Marist College	Apr 18–21, 2005	John Kerry	46%	Rudy Giuliani	48%	838 RV	±3.5%
Marist College	Apr 18–21, 2005	John Edwards	43%	John McCain	46%	838 RV	±3.5%
Marist College	Apr 18–21, 2005	John Edwards	48%	Rudy Giuliani	45%	838 RV	±3.5%
Moore Information	Mar 21–23, 2005	Hillary Clinton	38%	John McCain	49%	800 RV	±3%
Moore Information	Mar 21–23, 2005	Hillary Clinton	41%	Rudy Giuliani	47%	800 RV	±3%
Democracy Corps/Greenberg Quinlan Rosner (D)	Mar 15–21, 2005	Hillary Clinton	50%	Jeb Bush	47%	501 LV	Not reported
Quinnipiac University	Mar 2–7, 2005	Hillary Clinton	43%	Rudy Giuliani	44%	1,534 RV	±2.5%
Quinnipiac University	Mar 2–7, 2005	Hillary Clinton	41%	John McCain	43%	1,534 RV	±2.5%
The Hotline/Westhill Partners	Feb 24–27, 2005	Bill Richardson	36%	Arnold Schwarzenegger	27%	800 RV	±3.5%
Marist College	Feb 14–16, 2005	Hillary Clinton	42%	John McCain	54%	851 RV	±3.5%
Marist College	Feb 14–16, 2005	John Kerry	37%	John McCain	55%	851 RV	±3.5%
Marist College	Feb 14–16, 2005	Hillary Clinton	47%	Rudy Giuliani	49%	851 RV	±3.5%
Marist College	Feb 14–16, 2005	John Kerry	44%	Rudy Giuliani	50%	851 RV	±3.5%
Marist College	Feb 14–16, 2005	John Edwards	39%	John McCain	51%	851 RV	±3.5%
Marist College	Feb 14–16, 2005	John Edwards	43%	Rudy Giuliani	49%	851 RV	±3.5%
Marist College	Feb 14–16, 2005	Hillary Clinton	51%	Condoleezza Rice	43%	851 RV	±3.5%
Rasmussen Reports/Pulse Opinion Research	Jan 29–30, 2005	Hillary Clinton	47%	Condoleezza Rice	40%	1,000 A	±3%
Rasmussen Reports/Pulse Opinion Research	Jan 29–30, 2005	John Kerry	43%	Condoleezza Rice	45%	1,000 A	±3%
The Hotline/Westhill Partners	Jan 25–27, 2005	Hillary Clinton	46%	Jeb Bush	37%	800 RV	±3.5%
Fox News/Opinion Dynamics Corporation	Dec 14–15, 2004	John Kerry	45%	Jeb Bush	37%	900 RV	±3%
Fox News/Opinion Dynamics Corporation	Dec 14–15, 2004	Hillary Clinton	46%	Jeb Bush	35%	900 RV	±3%
Fox News/Opinion Dynamics Corporation	Dec 14–15, 2004	Hillary Clinton	41%	George Pataki	35%	900 RV	±3%
Fox News/Opinion Dynamics Corporation	Dec 14–15, 2004	Hillary Clinton	40%	Bill Frist	33%	900 RV	±3%
Quinnipiac University	Dec 7–12, 2004	Hillary Clinton	43%	Rudy Giuliani	45%	1,529 RV	±2.5%
Fox News/Opinion Dynamics Corporation	Nov 16–17, 2004	Hillary Clinton	38%	Rudy Giuliani	49%	900 RV	±3%
Fox News/Opinion Dynamics Corporation	Nov 16–17, 2004	Hillary Clinton	37%	John McCain	53%	900 RV	±3%
Fox News/Opinion Dynamics Corporation	Nov 16–17, 2004	John Kerry	41%	Rudy Giuliani	49%	900 RV	±3%
Fox News/Opinion Dynamics Corporation	Nov 16–17, 2004	John Kerry	38%	John McCain	50%	900 RV	±3%
Fox News/Opinion Dynamics Corporation	Nov 16–17, 2004	John Edwards	38%	Rudy Giuliani	50%	900 RV	±3%

=== Three-way contest ===
See

Poll Source	Date	Democrat(s)	%	Republican(s)	%	Independent(s)	%
Fox News/Opinion Dynamics	January 30–31, 2008	Hillary Clinton	41%	John McCain	41%	Michael Bloomberg	6%
Fox News/Opinion Dynamics	January 30–31, 2008	Hillary Clinton	46%	Mitt Romney	30%	Michael Bloomberg	8%
Rasmussen Reports Poll	Nov 9–11, 2007	Hillary Clinton	43%	Rudy Giuliani	38%	Michael Bloomberg	11%
Rasmussen Reports Poll	Oct 19–21, 2007	Hillary Clinton	45%	Rudy Giuliani	35%	Stephen Colbert	13%
Rasmussen Reports Poll	Oct 19–21, 2007	Hillary Clinton	46%	Fred Thompson	34%	Stephen Colbert	12%
Rasmussen Reports Poll	Sep 25–26, 2007	Hillary Clinton	42%	Rudy Giuliani	32%	Mike Bloomberg	7%
NBC News/Wall Street Journal Poll	July 27–30, 2007	Hillary Clinton	42%	Rudy Giuliani	34%	Michael Bloomberg	11%
Zogby America Poll	July 12–14, 2007	Hillary Clinton	41%	John McCain	36%	Mike Bloomberg	11%
Zogby America Poll	July 12–14, 2007	Hillary Clinton	44%	Rudy Giuliani	37%	Mike Bloomberg	7%
Zogby America Poll	July 12–14, 2007	Hillary Clinton	44%	Fred Thompson	37%	Mike Bloomberg	8%
Zogby America Poll	July 12–14, 2007	Hillary Clinton	44%	Mitt Romney	32%	Mike Bloomberg	10%
Zogby America Poll	July 12–14, 2007	Barack Obama	43%	Rudy Giuliani	39%	Mike Bloomberg	6%
Zogby America Poll	July 12–14, 2007	Barack Obama	41%	John McCain	37%	Mike Bloomberg	9%
Zogby America Poll	July 12–14, 2007	Barack Obama	44%	Fred Thompson	36%	Mike Bloomberg	7%
Zogby America Poll	July 12–14, 2007	Barack Obama	45%	Mitt Romney	29%	Mike Bloomberg	9%
Zogby America Poll	July 12–14, 2007	John Edwards	39%	Rudy Giuliani	41%	Mike Bloomberg	9%
Zogby America Poll	July 12–14, 2007	John Edwards	39%	John McCain	36%	Mike Bloomberg	11%
Zogby America Poll	July 12–14, 2007	John Edwards	42%	Fred Thompson	37%	Mike Bloomberg	8%
Zogby America Poll	July 12–14, 2007	John Edwards	43%	Mitt Romney	31%	Mike Bloomberg	10%
Daily News Poll	July 10–12, 2007	Hillary Clinton	40%	Rudy Giuliani	33%	Michael Bloomberg	10%
USA Today/Gallup Poll	July 6–8, 2007	Hillary Clinton	45%	Rudy Giuliani	39%	Michael Bloomberg	12%
FOX News/Opinion Dynamics Poll	June 26–27, 2007	Hillary Clinton	39%	Rudy Giuliani	37%	Michael Bloomberg	7%
CNN/Opinion Research Corporation Poll	June 22–24, 2007	Hillary Clinton	41%	Rudy Giuliani	38%	Michael Bloomberg	17%
CNN/Opinion Research Corporation Poll	June 22–24, 2007	Barack Obama	40%	John McCain	34%	Michael Bloomberg	21%
Newsweek Poll	June 20–21, 2007	Hillary Clinton	46%	Rudy Giuliani	37%	Michael Bloomberg	11%
Newsweek Poll	June 20–21, 2007	Hillary Clinton	48%	Fred Thompson	33%	Michael Bloomberg	13%
Newsweek Poll	June 20–21, 2007	Hillary Clinton	46%	John McCain	35%	Michael Bloomberg	13%
Newsweek Poll	June 20–21, 2007	Barack Obama	44%	Rudy Giuliani	38%	Michael Bloomberg	11%
Newsweek Poll	June 20–21, 2007	Barack Obama	47%	Fred Thompson	32%	Michael Bloomberg	14%
Newsweek Poll	June 20–21, 2007	Barack Obama	46%	John McCain	35%	Michael Bloomberg	11%
Rasmussen Reports (New Jersey) Poll	June 3, 2007	Hillary Clinton	38%	Rudy Giuliani	29%	Michael Bloomberg	21%
Rasmussen Reports (New Jersey) Poll	June 3, 2007	Barack Obama	32%	Fred Thompson	20%	Michael Bloomberg	32%
Rasmussen Reports (New Jersey) Poll	June 3, 2007	John Edwards	34%	Mitt Romney	18%	Michael Bloomberg	32%
FOX News/Opinion Dynamics Poll	Feb 13–14, 2007	Hillary Clinton	40%	Rudy Giuliani	46%	Ralph Nader	5%
Cook Political Report/RT Strategies Poll	Dec 14–17, 2006	Hillary Clinton	37%	Rudy Giuliani	28%	John McCain	20%
NBC News/Wall Street Journal Poll	Dec 8–11, 2006	Hillary Clinton	40%	John McCain	39%	Michael Bloomberg	10%
WNBC/Marist Poll	Nov 27 – Dec 3, 2006	Hillary Clinton	41%	Rudy Giuliani	45%	Donald Trump	7%
WNBC/Marist Poll	Sep 18–20, 2006	Hillary Clinton	39%	Rudy Giuliani	44%	Michael Bloomberg	8%
Diageo/Hotline Poll	Nov 11–15, 2005	Hillary Clinton	34%	Jeb Bush	18%	John McCain	40%
Diageo/Hotline Poll	Nov 11–15, 2005	Hillary Clinton	35%	Condoleezza Rice	20%	John McCain	35%

==== Support likelihood ====
Poll Source	Date	Candidate	Support	Consider	Oppose	Never Heard Of	Unsure
WNBC/Marist Poll	Feb 12–15, 2007	Hillary Clinton	25%	30%	43%		2%
WNBC/Marist Poll	Feb 12–15, 2007	Barack Obama	17%	42%	32%		9%
WNBC/Marist Poll	Feb 12–15, 2007	Al Gore	12%	33%	52%		3%
WNBC/Marist Poll	Feb 12–15, 2007	John Edwards	12%	45%	35%		8%
WNBC/Marist Poll	Feb 12–15, 2007	Rudy Giuliani	16%	51%	30%		3%
WNBC/Marist Poll	Feb 12–15, 2007	John McCain	14%	44%	37%		5%
WNBC/Marist Poll	Feb 12–15, 2007	Newt Gingrich	6%	25%	64%		5%
WNBC/Marist Poll	Feb 12–15, 2007	Mitt Romney	7%	25%	44%		24%
FOX News/Opinion Dynamics Poll	Feb 13–14, 2007	Hillary Clinton	18%	34%	44%		3%
FOX News/Opinion Dynamics Poll	Feb 13–14, 2007	Rudy Giuliani	15%	44%	36%		5%
FOX News/Opinion Dynamics Poll	Feb 13–14, 2007	Barack Obama	12%	45%	34%		10%
FOX News/Opinion Dynamics Poll	Feb 13–14, 2007	John McCain	9%	43%	40%		8%
FOX News/Opinion Dynamics Poll	Feb 13–14, 2007	John Edwards	7%	39%	45%		9%
FOX News/Opinion Dynamics Poll	Feb 13–14, 2007	Newt Gingrich	7%	19%	64%		9%
FOX News/Opinion Dynamics Poll	Feb 13–14, 2007	Ralph Nader	3%	14%	76%		8%
Newsweek Poll	Nov 9–10, 2006	Hillary Clinton	33%	20%	45%	0%	2%
Newsweek Poll	Nov 9–10, 2006	Rudy Giuliani	24%	30%	32%	10%	4%
Newsweek Poll	Nov 9–10, 2006	Condoleezza Rice	24%	27%	43%	4%	2%
Newsweek Poll	Nov 9–10, 2006	Al Gore	21%	24%	53%	0%	2%
Newsweek Poll	Nov 9–10, 2006	John McCain	20%	34%	32%	10%	4%
Newsweek Poll	Nov 9–10, 2006	Barack Obama	20%	19%	24%	34%	3%
Newsweek Poll	Nov 9–10, 2006	John Kerry	16%	24%	55%	2%	3%
Newsweek Poll	Nov 9–10, 2006	John Edwards	15%	28%	36%	16%	5%
Newsweek Poll	Nov 9–10, 2006	Newt Gingrich	10%	17%	58%	12%	3%
Newsweek Poll	Nov 9–10, 2006	Joe Biden	7%	17%	34%	36%	6%
Newsweek Poll	Nov 9–10, 2006	Mitt Romney	6%	13%	27%	48%	6%
Newsweek Poll	Nov 9–10, 2006	Sam Brownback	3%	7%	23%	61%	6%
Newsweek Poll	Nov 9–10, 2006	Duncan Hunter	1%	6%	19%	69%	5%
Time Poll	Oct 3–4, 2006	Rudy Giuliani	17%	55%	19%		18%
Time Poll	Oct 3–4, 2006	Hillary Rodham Clinton	23%	36%	37%		5%
Time Poll	Oct 3–4, 2006	John McCain	12%	56%	19%		13%
Time Poll	Oct 3–4, 2006	Al Gore	16%	44%	35%		5%
Time Poll	Oct 3–4, 2006	John Kerry	14%	43%	34%		9%
Time Poll	Jul 13–17, 2006	Rudy Giuliani	17%	54%	14%		15%
Time Poll	Jul 13–17, 2006	Hillary Rodham Clinton	19%	41%	34%		6%
Time Poll	Jul 13–17, 2006	John McCain	12%	52%	13%		22%
Time Poll	Jul 13–17, 2006	Al Gore	16%	45%	32%		7%
Time Poll	Jul 13–17, 2006	John Kerry	12%	48%	30%		10%
CNN Poll	Jun 1–6, 2006	Hillary Rodham Clinton	22%	28%	47%		3%
CNN Poll	Jun 1–6, 2006	Al Gore	17%	32%	48%		3%
CNN Poll	Jun 1–6, 2006	John Kerry	14%	35%	47%		4%
CNN Poll	Jun 1–6, 2006	Rudolph Giuliani	19%	45%	30%		6%
CNN Poll	Jun 1–6, 2006	John McCain	12%	48%	34%		6%
CNN Poll	Jun 1–6, 2006	Jeb Bush	9%	26%	63%		2%
ABC News/Washington Post Poll	May 11–15, 2006	Hillary Clinton	19%	38%	42%		1%
ABC News/Washington Post Poll	May 11–15, 2006	John McCain	9%	57%	28%		6%
FOX News/Opinion Dynamics Poll	Feb 7–8, 2006	Hillary Clinton	35%	19%	44%		2%
FOX News/Opinion Dynamics Poll	Feb 7–8, 2006	Rudy Giuliani	33%	38%	24%		6%
FOX News/Opinion Dynamics Poll	Feb 7–8, 2006	John McCain	30%	40%	22%		7%
FOX News/Opinion Dynamics Poll	Feb 7–8, 2006	John Kerry	29%	23%	45%		3%
FOX News/Opinion Dynamics Poll	Feb 7–8, 2006	Condoleezza Rice	14%	38%	46%		3%
CNN/USA Today/Gallup Poll	Jan 20–22, 2006	Hillary Rodham Clinton	16%	32%	51%		1%
Diageo/Hotline Poll	Nov 11–15, 2005	John McCain	23%	46%	15%		15%
CNN/USA Today/Gallup Poll	May 20–22, 2005	Hillary Rodham Clinton	28%	31%	40%		1%
CNN/USA Today/Gallup Poll	Jun 9–10, 2003	Hillary Rodham Clinton	20%	33%	45%		2%

=== Other polls ===
==== Candidate distinctions ====
Would you be willing to vote for a female presidential candidate in 2008?

Poll Source	Date	Yes	No
USA Today/Gallup Poll	Feb 9–11, 2007	88%	11%
Times Union/Siena College Poll	Feb 6–9, 2007	81%	12%
Newsweek Poll	Dec 6–7, 2006	86%	8%
CBS News/New York Times Poll	Jan 20–25, 2006	92%	5%
Rasmussen Reports Poll	Apr 6–7, 2005	72%	17%

Would you be willing to vote for an African American presidential candidate in 2008?

Poll Source	Date	Yes	No
USA Today/Gallup Poll	Feb 9–11, 2007	94%	5%
Rasmussen Reports Poll	Jan 17–18, 2007	79%	12%
Newsweek Poll	Dec 6–7, 2006	93%	3%

Would you be willing to vote for a Mormon (a member of the Church of Jesus Christ of Latter-day Saints) presidential candidate in 2008?

Poll Source	Date	Yes	No
USA Today/Gallup Poll	Feb 9–11, 2007	72%	24%
Newsweek Poll	Dec 6–7, 2006	66%	25%
Rasmussen Reports	Nov 20, 2006	38%	43%

Would you be willing to vote for a Roman Catholic presidential candidate in 2008?

Poll Source	Date	Yes	No
USA Today/Gallup Poll	Feb 9–11, 2007	95%	4%

Would you be willing to vote for a Jewish presidential candidate in 2008?

Poll Source	Date	Yes	No
USA Today/Gallup Poll	Feb 9–11, 2007	92%	7%

Would you be willing to vote for a Hispanic presidential candidate in 2008?

Poll Source	Date	Yes	No
USA Today/Gallup Poll	Feb 9–11, 2007	87%	12%

Would you be willing to vote for a thrice-married candidate in 2008?

Poll Source	Date	Yes	No
USA Today/Gallup Poll	Feb 9–11, 2007	67%	30%

Poll Source	Date	Comfortable	Reservations	Uncomfortable
USA Today/Gallup Poll	Feb 9–11, 2007	54%	13%	30%

Would you be willing to vote for a seventy-two year old candidate in 2008?

Poll Source	Date	Yes	No
USA Today/Gallup Poll	Feb 9–11, 2007	57%	42%

Poll Source	Date	Comfortable	Reservations	Uncomfortable
USA Today/Gallup Poll	Feb 9–11, 2007	43%	15%	42%

Would you be willing to vote for a homosexual candidate in 2008?

Poll Source	Date	Yes	No
USA Today/Gallup Poll	Feb 9–11, 2007	55%	43%

Would you be willing to vote for an atheist candidate in 2008?

Poll Source	Date	Yes	No
USA Today/Gallup Poll	Feb 9–11, 2007	45%	53%

==== Candidate quality ====
===== If elected, would the following candidate make a good president or a bad president? =====
Poll Source	Date	Candidate	Good	Bad	Unsure
USA Today/Gallup Poll	Feb 9–11, 2007	Rudy Giuliani	65%	19%	15%
USA Today/Gallup Poll	Feb 9–11, 2007	Hillary Clinton	60%	35%	5%
USA Today/Gallup Poll	Feb 9–11, 2007	John McCain	60%	20%	20%
USA Today/Gallup Poll	Feb 9–11, 2007	Barack Obama	53%	19%	28%

==== Candidate ideology ====
Do you think the following candidate is too liberal, too conservative, or about right?

Poll Source	Date	Candidate	Too Liberal %	Too Conservative %	About Right %	Unsure %
WNBC/Marist Poll	Feb 12–15, 2007	Rudy Giuliani	16%	16%	51%	17%
WNBC/Marist Poll	Feb 12–15, 2007	Hillary Clinton	39%	6%	44%	11%

== See also ==
- 2008 United States presidential election
- Statewide opinion polling for the 2008 United States presidential election
- Statewide opinion polling for Hillary Clinton for the 2008 United States presidential election
- Nationwide opinion polling for the Democratic Party 2008 presidential candidates
- Statewide opinion polling for the 2008 Democratic Party presidential primaries
- Nationwide opinion polling for the Republican Party 2008 presidential candidates
- Statewide opinion polling for the 2008 Republican Party presidential primaries
- Historical polling for U.S. Presidential elections
