= Graphical representations of two-way-contest opinion polling data from the 2008 United States presidential election =

Barack Obama

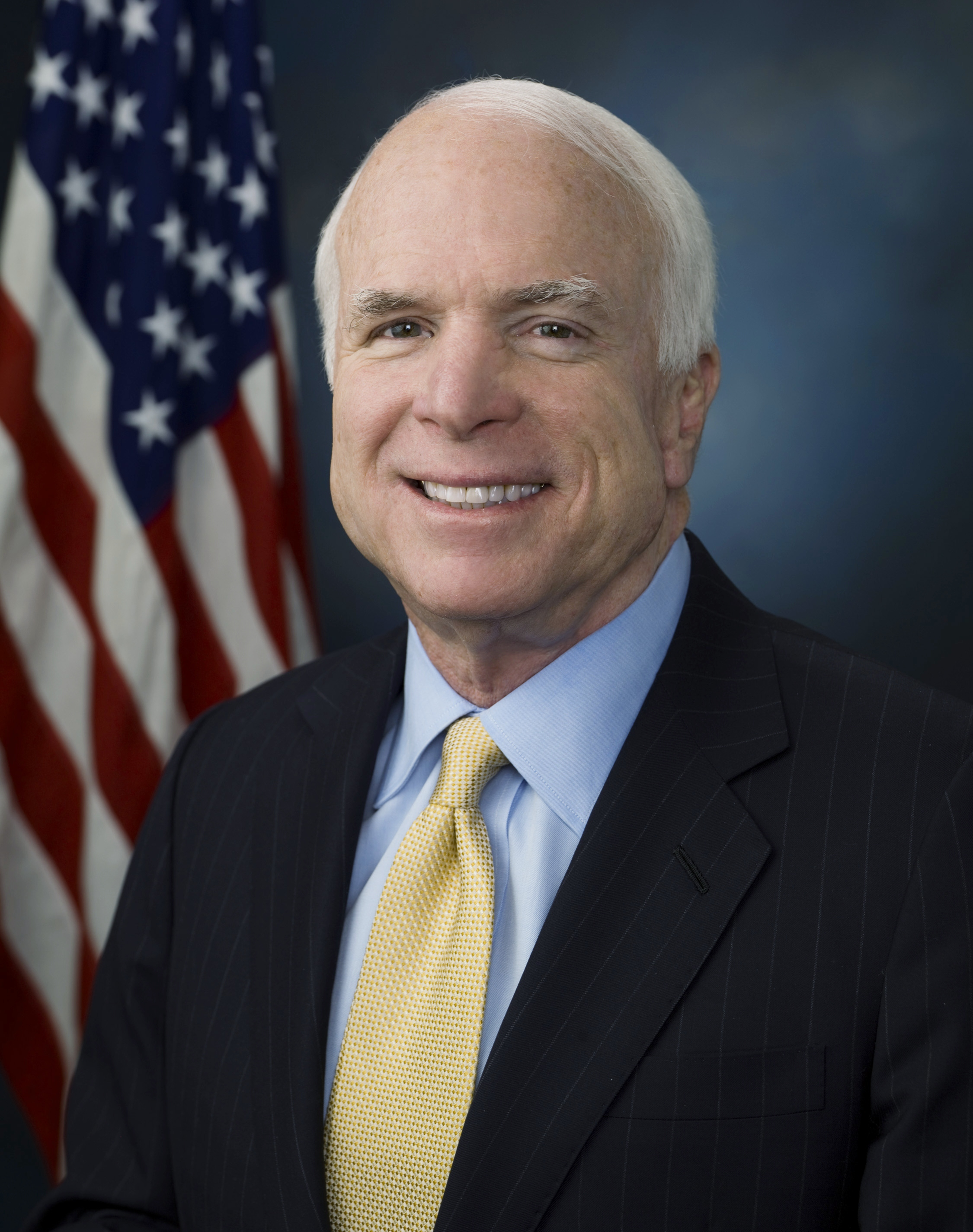
John McCain

This article provides line graphs and bar charts of scientific, nationwide public opinion polls that have been conducted relating to the 2008 United States presidential election. All graph data is taken from Nationwide opinion polling for the United States presidential election, 2008 and Statewide opinion polling for the United States presidential election, 2008. This page was last updated on November 8, 2008.

== Obama v. McCain ==
This shows the results of all polls from December 8, 2006, through November 4, 2008. The horizontal lines represent actual voting results on November 4.

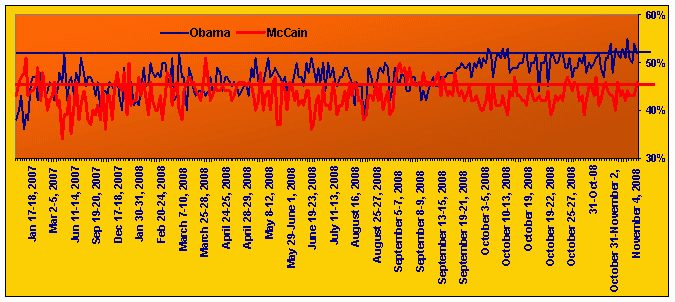

== Obama v. McCain by individual pollster ==
With the election near at hand, a closer look was needed to better see the ebb and flow from day to day. Since each pollster may have had a different set of parameters, it was useful to look at line graphs of a number of them on one page to better discern trends. Horizontal dashed lines represent actual final voting.

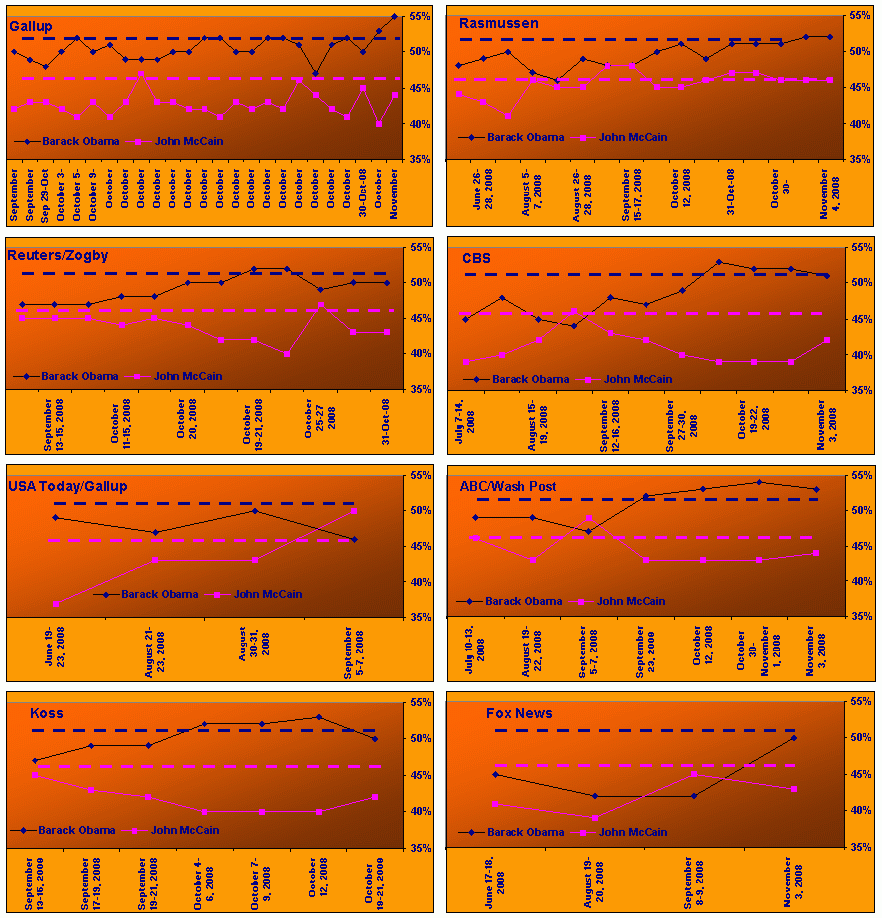

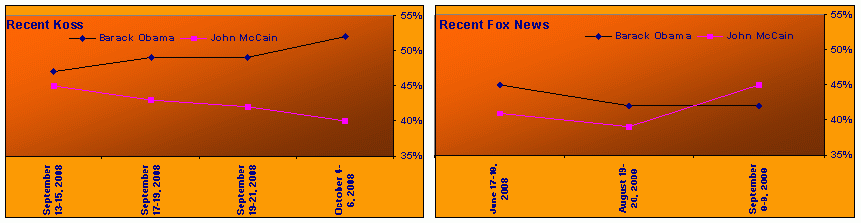

== Obama v. McCain v. Barr v. Nader ==
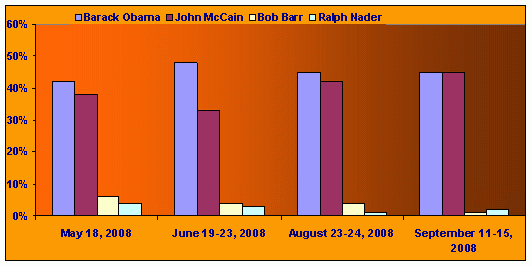

== Seven-way race ==
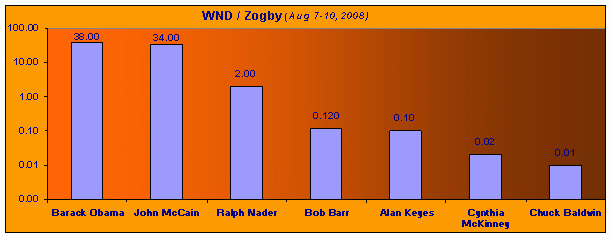

== Line graph, all candidates ==
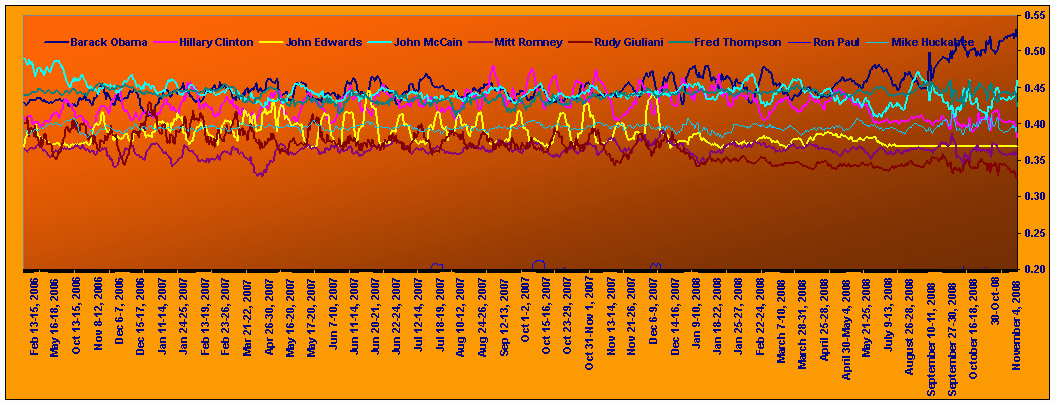

== Democrats v. Republicans ==
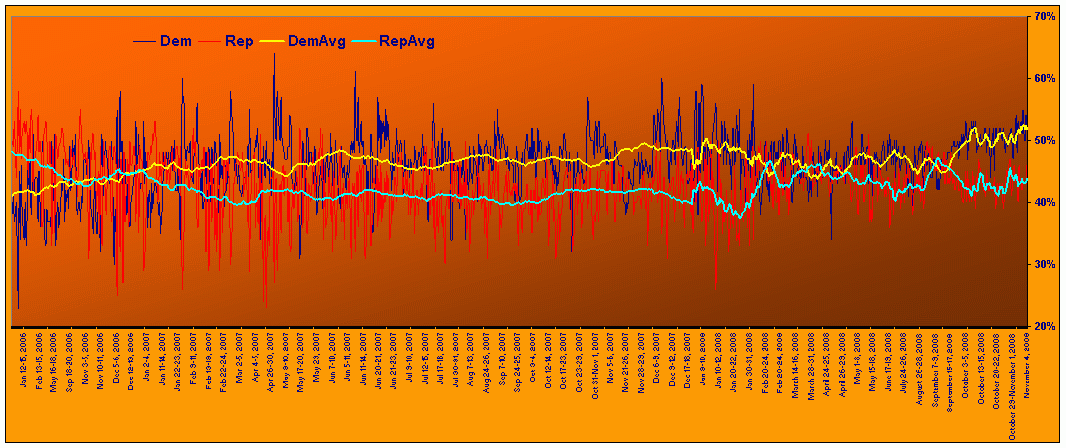
