= Nationwide opinion polling for the 2020 Democratic Party presidential primaries =

This is a list of nationwide public opinion polls that were conducted relating to the Democratic primaries for the 2020 United States presidential election. The persons named in the polls were declared candidates or had received media speculation about their possible candidacy.

Given the large number of candidates, the scores of certain low-polling and infrequently-polled candidates have been combined within the "other" column; their exact scores may be viewed by viewing the footnotes associated with each poll. The polls included are among Democrats or Democrats and Democratic-leaning independents, and do not include Republican-leaning independents. Open-ended polls are included and marked with an asterisk (*), but closed-ended versions of such polls are listed where possible. If multiple versions of polls are provided, the version used for debate qualification is prioritized, then the version among likely voters, then registered voters, then adults.

== Background ==
The Democratic National Committee (DNC) determined that candidates could qualify for the first two Democratic primary debates either by polling at 1% or higher in at least three national or early-state (Iowa, New Hampshire, Nevada, and South Carolina) polls sponsored or conducted by designated organizations (in different regions if by the same organization) published after January 1, 2019, up until June 12, 2019, or by a fundraising threshold requiring at least 65,000 unique donors with at least 200 in 20 different states. If more than 20 candidates met either threshold, candidates meeting both thresholds would be given highest priority for entry into the debates, followed by those with the highest polling average and those with the most donors. The pollsters and sponsors of polls designated for consideration by the DNC were the Associated Press, ABC News, CBS News, CNN, The Des Moines Register, Fox News, the Las Vegas Review-Journal, Monmouth University, NBC News, The New York Times, National Public Radio, Quinnipiac University, Reuters, the University of New Hampshire, USA Today, The Wall Street Journal, The Washington Post, and Winthrop University. Open-ended polls did not count towards the polling threshold. Only top-line polling results counted toward the threshold.

For the third and fourth primary debates, candidates were required to meet both polling and fundraising thresholds. Prior considerations were only polls between June 28 and August 28, 2019, and increased to 4 qualifying polls at 2% support, now excluding surveys sponsored by the Las Vegas Review-Journal and Reuters; the latter requirement was also increased, to 130,000 unique donors with at least 400 in 20 different states.

A total of 29 major candidates declared their candidacies for the primaries, the largest field of presidential primary candidates for any American political party since the modern primaries began in 1972, exceeding the field of 17 major candidates in the 2016 Republican Party presidential primaries.

Other individuals who were included in national Democratic primary polls but did not run for the 2020 nomination included Stacey Abrams, Michael Avenatti, Sherrod Brown, Hillary Clinton, Mark Cuban, Andrew Cuomo, Al Franken, Eric Garcetti, Eric Holder, Tim Kaine, Jason Kander, Joe Kennedy III, John Kerry, Mitch Landrieu, Terry McAuliffe, Chris Murphy, Gavin Newsom, Michelle Obama, Howard Schultz, Oprah Winfrey, and Mark Zuckerberg.

== Polling aggregation ==
The following graph depicts the standing of each candidate in the poll aggregators from December 2018 to April 2020.

View source data.

== 2020 ==
– Debate qualifying poll as designated by the Democratic National Committee (DNC)

=== April–August 2020 ===
April–August 2020 polling
Poll source	Date(s) administered	Sample size (Note: Key: A – all adults RV – registered voters LV – likely voters V – unclear)	Margin of error	Joe Biden	Bernie Sanders	Someone else	Would not vote	Undecided
	August 20	Democratic National Convention ends						
YouGov/Economist	Aug 16–18, 2020	559 (LV)	–	59%	33%	–	–	7%
	August 11	Connecticut primary						
YouGov/Economist	Aug 9–11, 2020	587 (LV)	–	59%	33%	–	–	8%
YouGov/Economist	Aug 2–4, 2020	527 (LV)	–	61%	32%	–	–	7%
YouGov/Economist	Jul 26–28, 2020	576 (LV)	–	60%	33%	–	–	7%
YouGov/Economist	Jul 19–21, 2020	557 (LV)	–	61%	32%	–	–	7%
YouGov/Economist	Jul 12–14, 2020	598 (LV)	–	58%	35%	–	–	8%
	July 12	Puerto Rico primary						
	July 11	Louisiana primary						
	July 7	Delaware and New Jersey primaries						
YouGov/Economist	Jul 5–7, 2020	559 (LV)	–	57%	34%	–	–	10%
YouGov/Economist	Jun 28–30, 2020	605 (LV)	–	59%	34%	–	–	7%
	June 23	Kentucky and New York primaries						
YouGov/Economist	Jun 21–23, 2020	561 (LV)	–	57%	37%	–	–	6%
YouGov/Economist	Jun 14–16, 2020	541 (LV)	–	60%	33%	–	–	7%
	June 9	Georgia and West Virginia primaries						
YouGov/Economist	Jun 7–9, 2020	649 (LV)	–	56%	38%	–	–	7%
	June 6	Guam and U.S. Virgin Islands caucuses						
	June 5	Biden secures a majority of pledged delegates and becomes the presumptive Democratic nominee						
	June 2	District of Columbia, Indiana, Maryland, Montana, New Mexico, Pennsylvania, Rhode Island and South Dakota Democratic primaries						
YouGov/Economist	May 31–Jun 2	589 (LV)	–	60%	33%	–	–	7%
Zogby/EMI/Washington Examiner	May 26 (Note: Additional data sourced from fivethirtyeight.com)	< 1000 (LV) (Note: Democratic subsample not yet released)	–	55%	–	37%	–	–
	May 22	Hawaii primary						
	May 19	Oregon primary						
YouGov/Economist	May 17–19	581 (LV)	–	62%	33%	–	–	5%
	May 12	Nebraska primary						
YouGov/Economist	May 10–12	602 (LV)	–	57%	36%	–	–	7%
Rasmussen Reports	May 10–11	< 1000 (LV) (Note: "Likely Democratic" sample not yet released)	–	54%	–	28%	–	18%
YouGov/Economist	May 3–5	547 (LV)	–	55%	37%	–	–	7%
Morning Consult	May 2–3	737 (RV)	± 4%	61%	–	26% (Note: "The Democrats should probably or definitely select another nominee" with 26%)	–	13%
	May 2	Kansas primary						
	Apr 28	Ohio primary						
Winston Group	Apr 27–28	≈670 (RV) (Note: 67% (rounded to the nearest integer) of a sample of 1000 RVs)	–	54%	17%	2%	18%	8%
YouGov/Economist	Apr 26–28	563 (LV)	–	59%	32%	–	–	9%
Emerson College	Apr 26–28	479 (RV)	–	68%	24%	3%	2% (Note: Listed as "did not vote" in the context of polling a sample of primary voters including those in states with primaries that had already been held before the sampling period)	7%
YouGov/Economist	Apr 19–21	544 (LV)	–	60%	34%	–	–	6%
	Apr 17	Wyoming caucuses						
YouGov/Economist	Apr 12–14	586 (LV)	–	49%	31%	18%	–	2%
	Apr 10	Alaska primary						
Zogby Analytics	Apr 8–9	679 (LV)	± 3.8%	61%	–	30% (Note: Andrew Cuomo with 19%; "someone else" with 11%)	–	9%
	Apr 8	Sanders withdraws from the race						
	Apr 7	Wisconsin primary						
YouGov/Economist	Apr 5–7	586 (LV)	–	49%	28%	18%	–	5%
CNN/SSRS	Apr 3–6	462 (RV)	± 5.6%	65%	30%	1%	–	5%
Morning Consult	Mar 30–Apr 5	13,346 (LV)	± 1.0%	61%	36%	3%	–	–
Winston Group	Apr 1–3	≈670 (RV)	–	48%	27%	2%	14%	10%
IBD/TIPP	Mar 29–Apr 1	447 (RV)	–	62%	30%	3%	–	5%

=== March 2020 ===
March 2020 polling
Poll source	Date(s) administered	Sample size	Margin of error	Joe Biden	Bernie Sanders	Tulsi Gabbard	Someone else	Would not vote	Undecided
YouGov/Economist	Mar 29–31	573 (LV)	–	47%	34%	–	15%	–	4%
HarrisX/The Hill	Mar 29–30	425 (RV)	± 4.7%	54%	32%	–	5%	–	10%
Morning Consult	Mar 23–29	15,101 (LV)	± 1.0%	61%	36%	–	3%	–	–
Harvard-Harris	Mar 24–26	903 (RV)	–	58%	32%	–	–	1%	9%
ABC/Washington Post	Mar 22–25	388 (RV)	± 5.5%	55%	39%	–	2%	5% (Note: "Neither" [Biden nor Sanders] with 3%, reported separately from "Other" with 2%)	1%
YouGov/Economist	Mar 22–24	545 (LV)	–	47%	34%	–	16%	–	3%
Echelon Insights	Mar 20–24	490 (LV)	–	66%	29%	–	–	–	–
Ipsos/Reuters	Mar 18–24	1,981 (A)	± 2.5%	53%	34%	2%	2%%	0%	8%
Morning Consult	Mar 16–22	16,180 (LV)	± 1.0%	60%	36%	–	5%	–	–
	Mar 19	Gabbard withdraws from the race							
Emerson College	Mar 18–19	519 (LV)	± 4.3%	54%	42%	–	4%	–	–
	Mar 17	Arizona, Florida, and Illinois primaries							
YouGov/Economist	Mar 15–17	551 (LV)	–	48%	32%	–	13%	–	6%
Ipsos/Reuters	Mar 13–16	458 (RV)	± 5.2%	48%	39%	2%	2%	0%	8%
	Mar 15	Eleventh Democratic primary debate							
HarrisX/The Hill	Mar 14–15	894 (RV)	± 3.3%	55%	31%	4%	3%	–	7%
	Mar 14	Northern Mariana Islands Democratic caucus							
Morning Consult	Mar 11–15	8,869 (LV)	± 1.0%	58%	37%	3%	3%	–	
Winston Group	Mar 11–13	≈670 (RV)	–	50%	24%	4%	1%	12%	9%
NBC/WSJ	Mar 11–13	438 (LV)	± 4.68%	61%	32%	4%	–	1%	2%
Hofstra University	Mar 5–12	572 (LV)	± 2.9%	58%	35%	2%	5%	–	–
Morning Consult	Mar 11	2,072 (LV)	± 2.0%	59%	35%	3%	3%	–	–
	Mar 11	COVID-19 declared a pandemic by the World Health Organization; national emergency declared on Mar 13							
	Mar 10	Democrats Abroad, Idaho, Michigan, Mississippi, Missouri, North Dakota, and Washington primaries							
YouGov/Economist	Mar 8–10	573 (LV)	–	53%	38%	2%	–	1%	6%
Chism Strategies	Mar 9	840 (LV)	± 3.38%	50%	42%	4%		–	5%
HarrisX/The Hill	Mar 8–9	442 (RV)	± 4.6%	55%	28%	5%	4%	–	8%
Ipsos/Reuters	Mar 6–9	420 (RV)	± 5.5%	54%	33%	2%	3%	0%	8%
Morning Consult	Mar 5–8	9,593 (LV)	± 1.0%	56%	38%	3%	3%	–	–
Quinnipiac University	Mar 5–8	559 (RV)	± 4.2%	54%	35%	2%	1%	–	8%
CNN/SSRS	Mar 4–7	540 (RV)	± 5%	52%	36%	–	8% (Note: Warren with 7%; Someone else with 1%)	–	4%
Morning Consult	Mar 5	1,390 (LV)	± 3.0%	54%	38%	2%	6%	–	–

Poll source	Date(s) administered	Sample size	Margin of error	Joe Biden	Michael Bloomberg	Pete Buttigieg	Tulsi Gabbard	Amy Klobuchar	Bernie Sanders	Tom Steyer	Elizabeth Warren	Others	Would not vote	Undecided
	Mar 5	Warren withdraws from the race												
Ipsos/Reuters	Mar 4–5	474 (RV)	± 5.1%	45%	–	–	1%	–	32%	–	11%	4%	0%	7%
	Mar 4	Bloomberg withdraws from the race												
	Mar 3	Super Tuesday												
Morning Consult	Mar 2–3	961 (LV)	± 4.0%	36%	19%	–	–	–	28%	–	14%	3%	–	–
YouGov/Economist	Mar 1–3	722 (LV)	–	28%	11%	7%	2%	4%	24%	–	19%	–	–	–
	Mar 2	Klobuchar withdraws from the race												
HarrisX/The Hill	Mar 1–2	453 (RV)	± 4.6%	28%	20%	–	2%	3%	23%	–	11%	2%	–	10%
Ipsos/Reuters	Feb 28 – Mar 2	469 (RV)	–	15%	14%	10%	1%	4%	24%	2%	9%	2%	4%	14%
	Mar 1	Buttigieg withdraws from the race												
Morning Consult	Mar 1	2,656 (LV)	± 2.0%	26%	17%	10%	–	3%	29%	1%	11%	–	–	–

=== February 2020 ===
February 2020 polling
Poll source	Date(s) administered	Sample size	Margin of error	Joe Biden	Michael Bloomberg	Pete Buttigieg	Tulsi Gabbard	Amy Klobuchar	Bernie Sanders	Tom Steyer	Elizabeth Warren	Andrew Yang	Others	Would not vote	Undecided
	Feb 29	South Carolina primary; Steyer withdraws from the race													
IBD/TIPP	Feb 20–29	325 (RV)	–	20%	13%	7%	– (Note: not reported)	6%	23%	–	17%	–	–	–	–
Harvard-Harris	Feb 26–28	925 (RV)	–	20%	18%	10%	1%	2%	25%	3%	11%	–	1%	2%	7%
Morning Consult	Feb 26–27	5,334 (LV)	± 1.0%	21%	17%	10%	2%	4%	33%	3%	11%	–	–	–	–
YouGov/Yahoo News	Feb 26–27	–	–	21%	14%	10%	1%	4%	27%	2%	18%	–	–	–	–
Change Research	Feb 25–27	821 (LV)	–	14%	8%	9%	1%	3%	40%	2%	20%	–	–	–	–
SurveyUSA	Feb 25–26	825 (LV)	± 3.6%	21%	21%	9%	1%	4%	28%	2%	8%	–	–	–	5%
Fox News	Feb 23–26	1,000 (RV)	± 4.0%	18%	16%	12%	1%	5%	31%	2%	10%	–	–	1%	4%
	Feb 25	Tenth Democratic primary debate													
YouGov/Economist	Feb 23–25	584 (LV)	–	20%	11%	9%	4%	4%	30%	1%	16%	–	–	1%	4%
Ipsos/Reuters	Feb 19–25	1,808 (RV)	± 2.6%	17%	16%	11%	1%	4%	29%	3%	12%	–	1%	1%	6%
HarrisX/The Hill	Feb 23–24	470 (RV)	± 4.5%	17%	19%	12%	2%	3%	28%	3%	8%	–	– (Note: Not yet released)	–	8%
Morning Consult	Feb 23	2,631 (LV)	± 2.0%	18%	19%	11%	2%	4%	32%	3%	11%	–	–	–	–
	Feb 22	Nevada caucuses													
YouGov/CBS News	Feb 20–22	6,498 (LV)	± 1.7%	17%	13%	10%	1%	5%	28%	2%	19%	–	5% (Note: "Someone else" with 5%)	–	–
Saint Leo University	Feb 17–22	310 (LV)	–	25%	16%	6%	2%	3%	26%	2%	9%	–	–	–	–
Morning Consult	Feb 20	2,609 (LV)	± 2.0%	19%	17%	11%	–	5%	30%	–	12%	–	–	–	–
	Feb 19	Ninth Democratic primary debate													
YouGov/Economist	Feb 16–18	555 (LV)	± 3.0%	18%	12%	11%	2%	7%	24%	2%	16%	–	–	2%	5%
Emerson College	Feb 16–18	573 (LV)	± 2.7%	22%	14%	8%	4%	6%	29%	3%	12%	–	4%	–	–
ABC/Wash Post	Feb 14–17	408 (RV)	± 3.5%	16%	14%	8%	1%	7%	32%	2%	12%	–	–	–	–
NBC/WSJ	Feb 14–17	426 (LV)	± 4.8%	15%	14%	13%	1% (Note: via 538.com)	7%	27%	2%	14%	–	–	–	–
Ipsos/Reuters	Feb 14–17	543 (RV)	± 5.0%	13%	17%	11%	–	5%	25%	–	9%	–	–	–	–
SurveyUSA	Feb 13–17	1,022 (LV)	± 3.3%	18%	18%	12%	– (Note: not polled separately)	4%	29%	2%	10%	–	1% (Note: includes Tulsi Gabbard)	–	6%
Morning Consult	Feb 12–17	15,974 (LV)	± 1.0%	19%	20%	12%	2%	6%	28%	3%	10%	–	1%	–	–
Winston Group	Feb 15–16	≈670 (RV)	–	13%	16%	9%	2%	6%	23%	3%	9%	–	1% (Note: "Someone else" with 1%)	9%	10%
NPR/PBS NewsHour/Marist	Feb 13–16	1,164 (RV)	± 3.7%	15%	19%	8%	0%	9%	31%	2%	12%	–	0%	–	5%
HarrisX/The Hill	Feb 14–15	449 (RV)	± 4.6%	19%	18%	10%	0%	6%	22%	3%	12%	–	–	–	8%
Zogby Analytics	Feb 13–14	732 (LV)	± 3.6%	18%	20%	9%	3%	5%	24%	4%	10%	–	2% (Note: "Someone else" with 2%)	–	6%
YouGov/GW Politics	Feb 3–14	437 (RV)	–	21.5%	9.4%	10.5%	1.4%	3.1%	20.3%	1.1%	14.9%	4.1%	1.1% (Note: Patrick with 0.5%; Bennet with 0.4%; Delaney with 0.2%)	3.5%	8.9%
Morning Consult	Feb 12	2,639 (LV)	± 2%	19%	18%	11%	–	5%	29%	–	10%	–	–	–	–
	Feb 11	New Hampshire primary; Yang withdraws from the race													
YouGov/Economist	Feb 9–11	552 (LV)	–	18%	12%	10%	4%	7%	22%	1%	15%	2%	–	1%	6%
McLaughlin & Associates	Feb 7–11	479 (LV)	–	24%	16%	11%	1%	3%	21%	3%	11%	3%	1% (Note: Bennet with 1%; Patrick with 0%)	–	7%
HarrisX/The Hill	Feb 7–10	913 (RV)	± 3.2%	23%	16%	9%	1%	3%	20%	3%	9%	3%	3% (Note: Bennet and Patrick with 1%; someone else with 1%)	–	11%
Ipsos/Reuters	Feb 6–10	556 (RV)	± 3.6%	17%	15%	8%	1%	3%	20%	2%	11%	5%	2% (Note: Patrick with 1%; someone else with 1%)	3%	14%
Monmouth University	Feb 6–9	357 (RV)	± 5.2%	16%	11%	13%	1%	6%	26%	1%	13%	4%	0%	2%	5%
Quinnipiac University	Feb 5–9	665 (RV)	± 3.8%	17%	15%	10%	1%	4%	25%	1%	14%	2%	1%	1%	10%
Morning Consult	Feb 4–9	15,348 (LV)	± 1%	22%	17%	11%	1%	3%	25%	3%	11%	4%	2% (Note: Bennet with 1%; someone else with 1%)	–	–
	Feb 7	Eighth Democratic primary debate													
Morning Consult	Feb 5	2,500 (LV)	± 2.0%	24%	15%	12%	–	3%	25%	3%	11%	5%	–	–	–
Morning Consult	Feb 4–5	891 (LV)	± 3%	25%	14%	10%	2%	3%	22%	3%	13%	4%	1% (Note: Bennet with 1%)	–	4%
Morning Consult	Feb 4	2,500 (LV)	± 2.0%	27%	16%	9%	–	3%	24%	3%	11%	5%	–	–	–
YouGov/Economist	Feb 2–4	616 (LV)	–	24%	9%	9%	3%	6%	19%	2%	18%	3%	1%	1%	6%
Morning Consult	Feb 3	2,500 (LV)	± 2.0%	29%	16%	7%	–	3%	22%	2%	13%	5%	–	–	–
	Feb 3	Iowa caucuses													
Ipsos/Reuters	Jan 31 – Feb 3	551 (RV)	–	22%	9%	5%	1%	4%	19%	3%	10%	4%	2%	4%	17%
Winston Group	Jan 31 – Feb 2	≈670 (RV)	–	20%	13%	5%	2%	3%	17%	2%	8%	5%	4% (Note: Bennet with 2%; Patrick and "someone else" with 1%)	9%	9%
Atlas Intel	Jan 30 – Feb 2	532 (LV)	± 4.0%	24%	8%	5%	3%	2%	28%	– (Note: 5% for all other candidates combined)	11%	3%	–	–	12%
Morning Consult	Jan 27 – Feb 2	15,259 (LV)	± 1%	28%	14%	6%	2%	3%	24%	3%	14%	4%	3%	–	–

=== January 2020 ===
January 2020 polling
Poll source	Date(s) administered	Sample size	Margin of error	Joe Biden	Michael Bloomberg	Pete Buttigieg	Amy Klobuchar	Bernie Sanders	Tom Steyer	Elizabeth Warren	Andrew Yang	Other	Undecided
Ipsos/Reuters	Jan 29–30	565 (RV)	± 5.0%	23%	12%	4%	2%	18%	4%	10%	4%	1% (Note: Gabbard with 1%; Bennet and Patrick with 0%)	–
IBD/TIPP	Jan 23–30	336 (RV)	–	26%	8%	7%	3%	19%	2%	13%	4%	7% (Note: Bennet and Gabbard with 1%; Delaney and Patrick with no voters; "someone else" with 3%; refused with 2%)	11%
Harvard-Harris	Jan 27–29	980 (RV)	–	31%	13%	6%	3%	20%	2%	12%	3%	6% (Note: Gabbard with 1%; Delaney with 0%; other with 3%; would not vote with 2%)	7%
NBC/WSJ	Jan 26–29	428 (LV)	± 4.74%	26%	9%	7%	5%	27%	2%	15%	4%	3% (Note: Gabbard with 2%; Patrick with 1%; Bennet, Delaney, "none" and other with no voters)	2%
YouGov/Economist	Jan 26–28	591 (LV)	–	26%	4%	7%	4%	24%	1%	20%	4%	5% (Note: Gabbard with 3%; Patrick with 1%; Bennet and Delaney with 0%; would not vote with 1%)	4%
USC Dornlife/LA Times	Jan 15–28	2,227 (LV)	± 2%	34%	9%	9%	3%	18%	2% (Note: Support for Steyer, Yang, and all candidates listed in 'other' is estimated as the proportion of voters who support them plus (the proportion of undecided voters who lean towards them * the proportion of voters who are undecided))	16%	2%	3% (Note: Gabbard with 1%; Bennet with 0%; other with 2%)	3%
Quinnipiac University	Jan 22–27	827 (RV)	± 3.4%	26%	8%	6%	7%	21%	2%	15%	3%	2% (Note: Gabbard with 1%; Bennet, Delaney, and Patrick with 0%)	11%
YouGov Blue/Data for Progress (Note: By the time of this poll, Data for Progress, which has worked with both the Sanders and Warren campaigns, had endorsed Warren.)	Jan 18–27	1,619 (LV)	± 2.6%	30%	5%	8%	4%	21%	2%	23%	4%	2% (Note: Gabbard with 2%; Bennet, Delaney and Patrick with 0%; none of these with 1%)	–
Morning Consult	Jan 20–26	17,836 (LV)	± 1.0%	29%	12%	7%	3%	23%	3%	14%	5%	4% (Note: Bennet, Delaney and Gabbard with 1%; Patrick with 0%; someone else with 1%)	–
YouGov Blue/Data for Progress	Jan 18–26	1,619 (LV)	± 2.6%	42% (Note: If only Biden, Sanders and Warren remained candidates)	–	–	–	23%	–	30%	–	–	–
Ipsos/Reuters	Jan 22–23	545 (RV)	± 5.0%	24%	10%	7%	3%	20%	2%	12%	3%	1% (Note: Gabbard with 1%; Delaney and Patrick with 0%)	–
Emerson College	Jan 21–23	497 (LV)	± 4.1%	30%	7%	6%	4%	27%	1%	13%	8%	4% (Note: Bennet, Delaney and Gabbard with 1%; Patrick with 0%; someone else with 2%)	–
Echelon Insights	Jan 20–23	474 (LV)	–	26%	13%	7%	3%	23%	2%	10%	3%	3% (Note: Bennet with 2%; Gabbard with 1%; Delaney and Patrick with 0%)	10%
Washington Post/ABC News	Jan 20–23	276 (LV) (Note: Likely voter total used here is Democrats and Democratic-leaning registered voters listed as 'absolutely certain to vote')	–	34%	7%	4%	4%	22%	1%	14%	6%	6% (Note: Bennet with 2%; Patrick with 1%; Gabbard with 0%; other with 1%; "none of these" with 2%; would not vote with no voters)	3%
Winston Group	Jan 21–22	≈670 (RV)	–	20%	9%	6%	4%	16%	3%	9%	5%	18% (Note: Gabbard with 3%; Bennet, Delaney and Patrick with 1%; "someone else" with 0%; would not vote with 12%)	11%
HarrisX/The Hill	Jan 20–22	878 (RV)	±3.3%	29%	11%	5%	2%	17%	4%	9%	4%	8% (Note: Bennet and Gabbard with 2%; Delaney and Patrick with 1%; other with 2%)	11%
Fox News	Jan 19–22	495 (LV)	± 4.0%	26%	10%	7%	3%	23%	3%	14%	5%	2% (Note: Patrick with 1%; Bennet, Delaney, and Gabbard with 0%; None of these with 1%)	5%
YouGov/Economist	Jan 19–21	470 (RV)	–	28%	6%	8%	4%	18%	2%	21%	3%	4% (Note: Gabbard with 3%; Bennet, Delaney and Patrick with 0%; would not vote with 1%)	5%
Monmouth University	Jan 16–20	372 (LV)	± 5.1%	30%	9%	6%	5%	23%	1%	14%	3%	3% (Note: Bennet and Gabbard with 1%; Delaney and Patrick with 0%; Others with 1%; no one with 1%)	6%
CNN/SSRS	Jan 16–19	500 (RV)	± 5.3%	24%	5%	11%	4%	27%	2%	14%	4%	3% (Note: "No one" with 2%; Other with 1%; Bennet, Delaney, Gabbard and Patrick with 0%)	5%
Morning Consult	Jan 15–19	12,402 (LV)	± 1.0%	29%	10%	8%	3%	24%	3%	15%	4%	5% (Note: Gabbard with 2%; Bennet and Delaney with 1%; Patrick with 0%; someone else with 1%)	–
Pew Research Center*	Jan 6–19	5,861 (RV)	±1.9%	26%	5%	7%	2%	21%	1%	16%	3%	13% (Note: Booker with 1%; Bennet, Bullock, Castro, Delaney, Gabbard, Harris, O'Rourke, Patrick and Williamson with no voters; "Other response" with 12%)	5% (Note: Listed as "no response"; see the "Other" column for other potentially undecided voters)
Zogby Analytics	Jan 15–16	438 (LV)	–	24%	11%	8%	4%	24%	3%	11%	6%	4% (Note: Gabbard with 2%; someone else with 2%)	6%
Ipsos/Reuters	Jan 15–16	428 (RV)	± 5.4%	23%	11%	7%	2%	22%	1%	14%	3%	3% (Note: Bennet with 2%; Patrick with 1%; Delaney, Gabbard and other with 0%; can't/won't vote with 0%)	13%
SurveyUSA	Jan 14–16	1,086 (LV)	± 3.6%	32%	9%	9%	2%	21%	3%	14%	4%	3% (Note: Gabbard with 2%; other with 1%)	3%
	Jan 14	Seventh Democratic primary debate											
HarrisX/The Hill	Jan 13–14	451 (RV)	± 4.6%	29%	7%	4%	3%	19%	3%	11%	2%	5% (Note: Bennet with 2%; Delaney and Gabbard with 1%; Patrick with 0%; other with 1%)	15%
YouGov/Economist	Jan 11–14	521 (LV)	–	27%	5%	7%	3%	20%	1%	19%	3%	4% (Note: Booker and Gabbard with 2%; Bennet, Delaney and Patrick with 0%; would not vote with 2%)	6%
	Jan 13	Booker withdraws from the race											
Quinnipiac University	Jan 8–12	651 (RV)	± 3.8%	25%	6%	8%	4%	19%	1%	16%	5%	5% (Note: Bennet, Booker, Gabbard, and Patrick with 1%; Delaney with 0%; wouldn't vote with 1%; someone else with 0%)	11%
Morning Consult	Jan 6–12	17,096 (LV)	± 1.0%	29%	8%	8%	3%	23%	4%	14%	5%	7% (Note: Booker and Gabbard with 2%; Bennet and Delaney with 1%; Patrick with 0%; someone else with 1%)	–
IBD/TIPP	Jan 3–11	333 (RV)	–	26%	7%	9%	3%	15%	2%	20%	3%	7% (Note: Gabbard, Delaney and Williamson with 1%; Booker with 0%; Delaney and Patrick with no voters; someone else with 3%; refused with 1%)	9%
Ipsos/Reuters	Jan 8–9	436 (RV)	± 5.4%	23%	8%	7%	1%	20%	3%	15%	3%	6% (Note: Booker with 2%; Bennet, Delaney and Williamson with 1%; Gabbard and Patrick with 0%; other with 1%; would not vote with no voters)	13%
YouGov/Economist	Jan 5–7	574 (LV)	–	27%	3%	7%	3%	20%	2%	22%	3%	6% (Note: Gabbard with 3%; Booker with 1%; Bennet, Delaney, Patrick and Williamson with 0%; would not vote with 2%)	5%
Morning Consult	Dec 30, 2019 – Jan 5, 2020	17,213 (LV)	± 1.0%	31%	7%	8%	3%	23%	4%	14%	4%	8% (Note: Booker & Gabbard with 2%; Bennet, Delaney & Williamson with 1%; Patrick with 0%; someone else with 1%)	–

== 2019 ==
– Debate qualifying poll as designated by the Democratic National Committee (DNC)

=== December 2019 ===
December 2019 polling
Poll source	Date(s) administered	Sample size	Margin of error	Joe Biden	Michael Bloomberg	Cory Booker	Pete Buttigieg	Tulsi Gabbard	Amy Klobuchar	Bernie Sanders	Tom Steyer	Elizabeth Warren	Andrew Yang	Other	Undecided
YouGov/Economist	Dec 28–31	548 (LV)	–	29%	3%	2%	8%	3%	4%	19%	2%	18%	3%	3% (Note: Castro with 1%; Bennet, Delaney, Patrick, and Williamson with 0%; would not vote with 2%)	6%
Winston Group	Dec 28–30	≈670 (RV)	–	28%	7%	3%	5%	1%	3%	11%	2%	9%	3%	14% (Note: Bennet and Castro with 1%; Delaney, Patrick, Williamson and "someone else" with 0%; would not vote with 12%)	13%
Harvard-Harris	Dec 27–29	780 (RV)	–	30%	7%	2%	7%	1%	2%	17%	2%	12%	3%	7% (Note: Castro, Delaney, Gillibrand and Messam with 1%; Gravel, Swalwell and Williamson with 0%; Ryan with no voters; other and would not vote with 1%)	10%
Morning Consult	Dec 23–29	17,787 (LV)	± 1.0%	32%	6%	3%	8%	1%	3%	21%	3%	14%	4%	5% (Note: Bennet, Castro, Delaney, and Williamson with 1%; Patrick with 0%; someone else with 1%)	–
The Hill/HarrisX	Dec 27–28	431 (RV)	± 4.7%	28%	11%	2%	6%	2%	2%	16%	2%	11%	2%	4% (Note: Castro with 2%; Williamson with 1%; Bennet and Patrick with 0%; other with 1%)	12%
YouGov/Economist	Dec 22–24	586 (LV)	–	30%	4%	2%	7%	2%	5%	17%	1%	19%	3%	5% (Note: Castro, Delaney, and Williamson with 1%; Bennet and Patrick with 0%; would not vote with 2%)	5%
Taubmann Center	Dec 19–23	412 (LV)	–	34%	4%	3%	7%	4%	2%	19%	–	20%	4%	4% (Note: Castro with 2%; Delaney and Williamson with 1%; Bennet with 0%)	–
Morning Consult	Dec 20–22	7,178 (LV)	± 1.0%	31%	6%	3%	9%	2%	3%	21%	3%	15%	5%	5% (Note: Bennet, Castro, Delaney and Williamson with 1%; Patrick with 0%; someone else with 1%)	–
	Dec 19	Sixth Democratic primary debate													
Ipsos/Reuters	Dec 18–19	709 (A)	–	18%	5%	1%	4%	2%	1%	15%	2%	10%	2%	8% (Note: Castro and Delaney with 1%; Bennet, Patrick and Williamson with 0%; other with 1%; can't/won't vote with 5%)	29%
McLaughlin & Associates	Dec 14–18	480 (LV)	–	27%	5%	3%	5%	2%	2%	17%	4%	15%	5%	5% (Note: Castro with 2%; Bennet, Delaney and Williamson with 1%; Patrick with 0%)	11%
Emerson College	Dec 15–17	525 (LV)	± 4.2%	32%	3%	2%	8%	4%	2%	25%	2%	12%	6%	2% (Note: Delaney with 1%; Bennet, Castro, Patrick, and Williamson with 0%; someone else with 3%)	–
NBC/WSJ	Dec 14–17	410 (LV)	± 4.84%	28%	4%	2%	9%	2%	5%	21%	1%	18%	3%	2% (Note: Castro with 1%; Bennet, Castro, Delaney, Patrick, and Williamson with 0%; no one with 1%)	5%
YouGov/Economist	Dec 14–17	555 (LV)	–	29%	4%	2%	7%	3%	4%	19%	2%	17%	3%	6% (Note: Castro with 2%; Bennet, Delaney, and Williamson with 1%; Patrick with 0%; "would not vote" with 1%)	4%
CNN/SSRS	Dec 12–15	408 (RV)	± 5.8%	26%	5%	3%	8%	1%	3%	20%	1%	16%	3%	6% (Note: Castro with 2%; Delaney with 1%; Bennet with 0%; Patrick and Williamson without voters; no one with 2%; someone else with 1%)	8%
Quinnipiac University	Dec 11–15	567 (RV)	± 4.1%	30%	7%	2%	9%	1%	3%	16%	1%	17%	3%	1% (Note: Castro with 1%; Bennet, Delaney, Patrick, and Williamson with 0%)	10%
Morning Consult	Dec 9–15	13,384 (LV)	± 1.0%	31%	7%	3%	8%	2%	2%	22%	3%	15%	4%	5%	–
HarrisX/The Hill	Dec 13–14	456 (RV)	± 4.6%	29%	5%	2%	5%	1%	3%	13%	3%	13%	3%	9% (Note: Castro with 4%; Delaney and Patrick with 2%; Bennet with 1%; Williamson with 0%)	13%
Suffolk University/USA Today	Dec 10–14	384 (LV)	–	23%	6%	3%	8%	1%	3%	14%	1%	13%	2%	1% (Note: "refused" with 1%, Patrick with 0%)	25%
Echelon Insights	Dec 9–14	447 (LV)	–	37%	6%	1%	6%	1%	2%	14%	1%	14%	2%	3% (Note: Castro with 2%; Delaney with 1%; Bennet, Patrick and Williamson with 0%)	13%
IBD/TIPP	Dec 5–14	312 (RV)	–	26%	5%	3%	9%	1%	2%	18%	2%	14%	2%	10% (Note: Bennet and Castro with 1%; Williamson with 0%; Delaney and Patrick with no voters; someone else with 3%; refused with 5%)	10%
Ipsos/Reuters	Dec 11–12	593 (RV)	–	21%	7%	– (Note: Data not yet released for this sample for Booker, Castro and Williamson)	5%	1%	2%	18%	3%	11%	3%	6% (Note: Patrick with 1%; Bennet with 0%; other with 2%; can't/won't vote with 3%)	18%
NPR/PBS NewsHour/Marist	Dec 9–11	704 (RV)	± 5.4%	24%	4%	4%	13%	1%	4%	22%	<1%	17%	5%	2% (Note: Castro and Bennet with 1%; Patrick, Williamson, and "other" with <1%, Delaney with no votes)	5%
Fox News	Dec 8–11	1,000 (RV)	± 4.5%	30%	5%	2%	7%	3%	5%	20%	1%	13%	3%	5% (Note: Bennet, Castro, and Williamson with 1%; Delaney and Patrick with 0%; "none of the above" with 2%)	7%
YouGov/Economist	Dec 7–10	497 (LV)	–	26%	4%	3%	11%	3%	2%	16%	1%	21%	3%	4% (Note: Bennet and Castro with 1%; would not vote with 2%)	6%
Quinnipiac University	Dec 4–9	665 (RV)	± 3.8%	29%	5%	1%	9%	2%	3%	17%	1%	15%	4%	5% (Note: Bennet, Castro, Delaney, and Williamson with 1%; Patrick with no voters; would not vote with 1%)	11%
Zogby Analytics	Dec 5–8	443 (LV)	± 4.7%	30%	8%	–	7%	3%	2%	20%	3%	16%	4%	3% (Note: someone else with 3%)	6%
Monmouth University	Dec 4–8	384 (RV)	± 5%	26%	5%	2%	8%	<1%	4%	21%	1%	17%	3%	5% (Note: Castro and Patrick with 1%; Williamson with <1%; Bennet and Delaney with 0%; other with <1%; no one with 3%)	11%
Morning Consult	Dec 2–8	15,442 (LV)	± 1.0%	30%	6%	3%	9%	2%	2%	22%	3%	16%	4%	5% (Note: Bennet, Castro, Delaney and Williamson with 1%; Patrick with 0%; "Someone else" with 1%)	–
Ipsos/Reuters	Dec 4–5	596 (A)	–	19%	4%	1%	6%	0%	1%	14%	1%	9%	3%	5% (Note: Castro, Delaney, and Patrick with 1%; Bennet with 0%; others with 2%; will not vote with 4%)	31%
	Dec 3	Harris withdraws from the race													
YouGov/Economist	Dec 1–3	541 (LV)	–	27%	3%	3%	12%	2%	3%	13%	0%	18%	2%	8% (Note: Harris with 4%; Bennet, Castro, Patrick and Williamson with 1%; Bullock, Delaney, and Sestak with 0%; would not vote with 1%)	7%
The Hill/HarrisX	Nov 30 – Dec 1	437 (RV)	–	31%	6%	1%	9%	0%	2%	15%	2%	10%	2%	8% (Note: Castro and Harris with 2%; Bennet, Bullock, Delaney and Patrick with 1%; Sestak and Williamson with 0%)	13%
David Binder Research	Nov 25 – Dec 1	1,200 (LV)	± 2.8%	29%	8%	2%	10%	2%	2%	15%	2%	14%	2%	8% (Note: Harris with 5%; Castro and Patrick with 1%; Bennet, Bullock, Sestak and Williamson with <1%; Delaney with 0%; other with 1%)	7%
Morning Consult	Nov 25 – Dec 1	15,773 (LV)	± 1.0%	29%	5%	2%	9%	2%	2%	20%	2%	15%	4%	11% (Note: Harris with 5%; Bennet, Castro, Delaney and Williamson with 1%; Patrick with 0%; someone else with 2%)	–

=== November 2019 ===
November 2019 polling
Poll source	Date(s) administered	Sample size	Margin of error	Joe Biden	Michael Bloomberg	Pete Buttigieg	Kamala Harris	Amy Klobuchar	Bernie Sanders	Elizabeth Warren	Andrew Yang	Other	Undecided
Harvard-Harris	Nov 27–29	756 (RV)	–	29%	7%	8%	5%	2%	16%	13%	3%	10% (Note: Steyer with 2%; Booker, Delaney, Gabbard, Gravel and Swalwell with 1%; Castro, Gillibrand, Messam and Williamson with 0%; Ryan with no voters; other with 0%; will not vote with 2%)	8%
YouGov/Economist	Nov 24–26	550 (LV)	–	23%	3%	12%	4%	3%	15%	17%	3%	10% (Note: Booker and Gabbard with 2%; Bullock, Castro, Delaney, Patrick, Steyer and Williamson with 1%; Bennet and Sestak with 0%; would not vote with 2%)	8%
Quinnipiac University	Nov 21–25	574 (RV)	± 4.9%	24%	3%	16%	3%	3%	13%	14%	2%	8% (Note: Bennet, Booker and Castro with 2%; Gabbard with 1%; Bullock, Delaney, Patrick, Sestak, Steyer, and Williamson with 0%; Someone else with 0%, Wouldn't vote with 1%)	11%
	Nov 24	Bloomberg announces his candidacy											
CNN/SSRS	Nov 21–24	431 (RV)	–	28%	3%	11%	3%	2%	17%	14%	3%	7% (Note: Steyer with 3%; Booker with 2%; Castro with 1%; Bennet, Bullock, Delaney, Gabbard, Patrick, Sestak and Williamson with 0%; Someone else with 1%; no one with 3%)	8%
CNN/SSRS	Nov 21–24	431 (RV)	– (Note: If only Biden, Buttigieg, Sanders and Warren remained as candidates)	35%	–	17%	–	–	23%	20%	–	3% (Note: no one 3%)	2%
Morning Consult	Nov 21–24	8,102 (LV)	± 1.0%	30%	2%	9%	5%	2%	21%	15%	4%	13% (Note: Booker, Gabbard and Steyer with 2%; Bennet, Bullock, Castro, Delaney and Williamson with 1%; Patrick with 0%; someone else with 2%)	–
Ipsos/Reuters	Nov 21–22	698 (A)	± 5.0%	21%	–	7%	2%	2%	17%	11%	5%	8% (Note: Steyer with 2%; Castro, Gabbard, and Patrick with 1%; Bennet, Bullock, Delaney, Messam, Sestak, and Williamson with 0%; someone else with 3%)	20%
SurveyUSA	Nov 20–21	1,088 (LV)	± 3.6%	30%	3%	11%	5%	2%	17%	15%	4%	9% (Note: Booker and Steyer with 2%; Castro, Gabbard and Patrick with 1%; others with 2%)	4%
SurveyUSA	Nov 20–21	1,088 (LV)	± 3.6%	32%	–	12%	5%	2%	17%	16%	4%	9% (Note: Booker, Gabbard and Steyer with 2%; Castro with 1%; others with 2%)	4%
RealClear Opinion Research	Nov 15–21	987 (LV)	–	30%	2%	6%	4%	1%	23%	12%	4%	9% (Note: Booker, Gabbard and Steyer with 2%; Bennet, Bullock, and Patrick with 1%; Castro, Delaney, Sestak and Williamson with 0%)	7%
	Nov 20	Fifth Democratic primary debate											
Emerson College	Nov 17–20	468 (LV)	± 4.5%	27%	1%	7%	3%	1%	27%	20%	4%	10% (Note: Gabbard and Steyer with 2%; Booker, Castro and Sestak with 1%; Bennet, Bullock, Delaney, Messam, Patrick and Williamson with 0%; someone else with 3%)	–
Change Research/Election Science	Nov 16–20	1,142 (LV)	± 2.9%	22%	1%	14%	4%	2%	23%	23%	4%	7% (Note: Gabbard with 2%; Bennet, Booker, Castro, Patrick and Williamson with 1%; Bullock, Delaney, Messam, Sestak and Steyer with 0%)	0%
YouGov/Economist	Nov 17–19	586 (LV)	–	30%	–	9%	4%	2%	12%	22%	2%	7% (Note: Gabbard with 3%; Bennet, Booker, Bullock, and Steyer with 1%; Castro, Delaney, Messam, Patrick, Sestak, and Williamson with 0%; would not vote with 3%)	7%
Swayable	Nov 16–18	1,787 (LV)	± 2.0%	30%	–	7%	5%	2%	17%	18%	4%	9% (Note: Booker, Castro, Steyer, and Williamson with 2%; Gabbard with 1%)	–
The Hill/HarrisX	Nov 16–17	449 (RV)	± 4.6%	30%	3%	7%	4%	1%	18%	15%	2%	9% (Note: Castro and Delaney with 2%; Bennet, Booker, Gabbard, Patrick and Steyer with 1%)	10%
Morning Consult	Nov 11–17	17,050 (LV)	± 1.0%	32%	3%	8%	5%	2%	20%	17%	3%	11% (Note: Booker and Gabbard with 2%; Bennet, Bullock, Castro, Delaney, Steyer and Williamson with 1%; Patrick with 0%; someone else with 1%)	–
Ipsos/Reuters	Nov 12–14	685 (A)	–	19%	3%	6%	3%	1%	19%	13%	2%	15% (Note: Bennet, Booker, Bullock, Castro, Gabbard and Steyer with 1%; Delaney, Messam, Sestak and Williamson with 0%; others with 3%; will not vote with 6%)	18%
Ipsos/Reuters	Nov 12–14	702 (A)	–	23%	–	6%	5%	1%	18%	11%	2%	9% (Note: Booker with 2%; Bullock, Castro, Gabbard and Steyer with 1%; Delaney, Messam, Sestak and Williamson with 0%; others with 3%; will not vote with 6%)	21%
YouGov/Economist	Nov 10–12	600 (LV)	–	23%	–	9%	5%	2%	17%	26%	4%	8% (Note: Castro and Gabbard with 2%; Booker, Bullock, Delaney and Steyer with 1%; Bennet, Messam, Sestak and Williamson with 0%; would not vote with 1%)	4%
Morning Consult	Nov 4–10	16,400 (LV)	± 1.0%	32%	2%	8%	5%	2%	20%	19%	3%	12% (Note: Booker with 3%; Bennet, Bullock, Castro, Delaney, Gabbard, Steyer and Williamson with 1%; someone else with 2%)	–
Ipsos/Reuters	Nov 6–7	538 (RV)	–	20%	–	5%	– (Note: Data not yet released for this sample for Booker, Bullock, Castro, Harris, Messam, Sestak and Williamson)	1%	16%	13%	3%	11% (Note: Gabbard and Steyer with 1%; Bennet with 0%; other with 3%; can't/won't vote with 6%)	23%
YouGov/Economist	Nov 3–5	579 (LV)	–	26%	–	8%	6%	2%	14%	25%	1%	12% (Note: Castro and Gabbard with 3%; Booker with 2%; Bullock, Delaney, Steyer and Williamson with 1%; Bennet, Messam and Sestak with 0%; will not vote with 2%)	6%
Ipsos/Reuters	Nov 1–4	686 (A)	–	22%	–	6%	4%	0%	15%	11%	2%	7% (Note: Bennet, Booker, Castro, O'Rourke and Steyer with 1%; Bullock, Delaney, Gabbard, Gillibrand, Hickenlooper, Messam and Williamson with 0%; others with 2%; will not vote with 5%)	25%
Change Research/Crooked Media	Oct 31 – Nov 3	456 (LV)	–	17%	–	14%	4%	2%	17%	21%	4%	6% (Note: Gabbard with 3%; Booker, O'Rourke and Steyer with 1%; Castro with 0%; Bennet, Bullock, Delaney, Messam, Sestak and Williamson with no voters)	14%
Monmouth University	Oct 30 – Nov 3	345 (RV)	± 5.3%	23%	–	9%	5%	2%	20%	23%	3%	6% (Note: Booker with 3%; Steyer with 1%; Bennet, Bullock and Williamson with <%1; Castro, Delaney, Gabbard and Sestak with 0%; "no one" with 1%; other with 1%)	7%
Morning Consult	Oct 28 – Nov 3	16,071 (LV)	± 1.0%	32%	–	7%	5%	2%	20%	20%	3%	12% (Note: Booker and Gabbard with 2%; Bennet, Bullock, Castro, Delaney, Steyer and Williamson with 1%; someone else with 2%)	–
USC Dornsife/ Los Angeles Times	Oct 21 – Nov 3	2,599 (LV)	± 2.0%	28%	–	6%	4%	2%	13%	16%	2%	6% (Note: O'Rourke with 2%; Booker, Gabbard, Steyer and Williamson with 1%; Bennet, Bullock, Castro, Delaney, Messam, Ryan and Sestak with 0%)	21%
The Hill/HarrisX	Nov 1–2	429 (RV)	± 4.7%	26%	–	6%	6%	3%	14%	15%	1%	11% (Note: Booker and Castro with 2%; Bullock, Bennet, Delaney, Gabbard, Sestak, Steyer and Williamson with 1%)	16%
	Nov 1	O'Rourke withdraws from the race											

=== October 2019 ===
October 2019 polling
Poll source	Date(s) administered	Sample size	Margin of error	Joe Biden	Cory Booker	Pete Buttigieg	Tulsi Gabbard	Kamala Harris	Amy Klobuchar	Beto O'Rourke	Bernie Sanders	Elizabeth Warren	Andrew Yang	Other	Undecided
Harvard-Harris	Oct 29–31	640 (RV) (Note: Democrats only)	–	33%	3%	4%	0%	5%	3%	2%	18%	15%	2%	5% (Note: Gillibrand, Steyer and Williamson with 1%; Castro, Gravel, Messam and Swalwell with 0%; Delaney with no voters; not planning on voting with 2%; other with 0%)	8%
Hofstra University/YouGov	Oct 25–31	541 (LV)	–	28%	3%	8%	2%	5%	2%	1%	12%	27%	2%	3% (Note: Bennet, Castro, and Steyer with 1%; Bullock, Delaney, Messam, Sestak, and Williamson with 0%)	8%
IBD/TIPP	Oct 24–31	361 (RV)	–	29%	1%	7%	0%	2%	3%	1%	13%	23%	3%	4% (Note: Castro, Steyer and Williamson with 1%; Bennet, Bullock, Delaney, Messam, Ryan and Sestak with 0%; someone else with 1%; refused with 1%)	13%
Fox News	Oct 27–30	471 (LV)	± 4.5%	31%	2%	7%	2%	3%	2%	2%	19%	21%	3%	2% (Note: Steyer with 1%; Bennet, Bullock, Castro with 0%; Delaney, Messam, Sestak, and Williamson with no voters; "none of these" with 1%; other with 0%)	4%
Fox News	Oct 27–30	471 (LV)	± 4.5%	–	–	–	–	–	–	–	–	–	–	38% (Note: Bloomberg with 6%; other with 32%)	62%
NBC News/Wall Street Journal	Oct 27–30	414 (LV)	± 4.8%	27%	2%	6%	2%	4%	5%	1%	19%	23%	3%	3% (Note: Bennet and Castro with 1%; Bullock, Delaney, Steyer, and Williamson with 0%; "none of these" with 1%; other with 0%)	5%
ABC News/Washington Post	Oct 27–30	452 (A)	± 5.5%	27%	2%	7%	2%	2%	1%	1%	19%	21%	2%	9–10% (Note: Castro with 2%; Bennet, Delaney and Steyer with 1%; Bullock and Williamson with <0.5%; "none of these" with 2%; other with 1%; would not vote with 1%)	6%
YouGov/Economist	Oct 27–29	630 (LV)	–	27%	1%	8%	2%	4%	2%	4%	14%	23%	3%	6% (Note: Bennet, Castro, Delaney and Steyer with 1%; Bullock, Messam, Sestak and Williamson with 0%; would not vote with 2%)	7%
Swayable	Oct 26–27	2,172 (LV)	± 2.0%	29%	3%	6%	2%	4%	2%	3%	17%	19%	3%	8% (Note: Castro and Williamson with 2%; Bennet, Bullock, Delaney, and Steyer with 1%)	–
Morning Consult	Oct 21–27	16,186 (LV)	± 1.0%	32%	2%	7%	2%	6%	2%	2%	20%	20%	3%	7% (Note: Bennet, Bullock, Castro, Delaney, Ryan, Steyer, Williamson and someone else with 1%)	–
Suffolk University/USA Today	Oct 23–26	399 (LV)	± 4.9%	26%	2%	10%	4%	3%	2%	0%	13%	17%	3%	4% (Note: Steyer and Williamson with 1%; Bennet, Castro, Messam and Sestak with 0%; Bullock and Delaney with no voters; refused with 1%)	18%
Echelon Insights	Oct 21–25	449 (RV)	–	32%	2%	6%	1%	5%	2%	1%	15%	22%	1%	3% (Note: Bullock, Ryan and Steyer with 1%; Bennet, Castro, Delaney, Messam, Sestak and Williamson with 0%)	11%
The Hill/HarrisX	Oct 21–22	1,001 (RV)	± 3.1%	27%	1%	6%	0%	5%	1%	3%	14%	19%	2%	7% (Note: Bennet, Castro, Messam, Ryan, Sestak, and Steyer with 1%; Delaney, Bullock, and Williamson with 0%; "Other" with 1%)	13%
YouGov/Economist	Oct 20–22	628 (LV)	–	24%	2%	8%	3%	5%	1%	2%	15%	21%	3%	5% (Note: Bennet, Castro, Ryan, Steyer and Williamson with 1%; Bullock, Delaney, Messam and Sestak with 0%; "would not vote" with 3%)	6%
McLaughlin & Associates	Oct 17–22	468 (LV)	–	28%	3%	3%	2%	6%	2%	3%	18%	16%	6%	5% (Note: Bullock, Castro, Delaney, Ryan, and Williamson with 1%; Bennet, Messam, and Steyer with 0%)	15%
Winston Group	Oct 18 – 21	≈670 (RV)	–	27%	1%	5%	2%	3%	1%	2%	10%	17%	3%	15% (Note: Castro, Ryan and Williamson with 1%; Bullock, Delaney, Sestak and Steyer with 0%; Bennet with no votes; "someone else" with 1%; "Do not plan to vote in the Democratic primary" with 11%)	13%
Emerson College	Oct 18–21	430 (RV)	± 4.7%	27%	3%	6%	3%	5%	1%	2%	25%	21%	4%	3% (Note: Steyer with 1%; Bennet, Bullock, Castro, Delaney, Ryan, Sestak, and Williamson with 0%; "Someone else" with 2%)	–
Quinnipiac University	Oct 17–21	713 (RV)	± 4.6%	21%	1%	10%	1%	5%	3%	1%	15%	28%	1%	3% (Note: Castro and Steyer with 1%; Bennet, Bullock, Delaney, Messam, Ryan, Sestak, and Williamson with 0%; Someone else with 1%)	9%
CNN/SSRS	Oct 17–20	424 (RV)	± 5.8%	34%	1%	6%	1%	6%	3%	3%	16%	19%	2%	3% (Note: Bennet, Ryan, and Steyer with 1%; Bullock, Castro, Delaney, Sestak, and Williamson with 0%)	6%
Morning Consult	Oct 16–20	11,521 (LV)	± 1.0%	30%	3%	6%	1%	6%	2%	3%	18%	21%	3%	8%	–
Ipsos/Reuters	Oct 17–18	566 (RV)	–	24%	1%	5%	2%	4%	1%	3%	15%	17%	2%	9% (Note: Castro and Williamson with 1%; Bullock, Messam, and Ryan with 0%; can't/won't vote with 3%; other with 2%)	16%
HarrisX	Oct 11–18	1,839 (LV)	± 2.3%	34%	2%	4%	1%	5%	2%	3%	16%	18%	2%	4% (Note: Bullock, Castro, and Steyer with 1%; Bennet, Delaney, Messam, Ryan, Sestak and Williamson with 0%; other and would not vote with 0%)	10%
Morning Consult	Oct 16	2,202 (LV)	± 2.0%	31%	2%	6%	1%	7%	2%	2%	18%	21%	3%	9% (Note: Steyer with 2%; Bennet, Bullock, Castro, Delaney, Ryan, Williamson and someone else with 1%)	–
SurveyUSA	Oct 15–16	1,017 (LV)	± 3.7%	32%	2%	5%	1%	7%	2%	2%	17%	22%	2%	2% (Note: Castro and Steyer with 1%; "some other Democrat" with 1%)	4%
	Oct 15	Fourth Democratic primary debate													
YouGov/Economist	Oct 13–15	623 (LV)	–	25%	2%	6%	2%	5%	2%	2%	13%	28%	2%	3% (Note: Bennet, Delaney, and Steyer with 1%; Bullock, Castro, Messam, Ryan, Sestak, and Williamson with 0%)	6%
Quinnipiac University	Oct 11–13	505 (RV)	± 5.3%	27%	2%	8%	<0.5%	4%	2%	2%	11%	30%	2%	4% (Note: Steyer with 2%; Bennet and Castro with 1%; Bullock, Delaney, Messam, Ryan, Sestak and Williamson with less than 0.5%)	8%
Public Religion Research Institute	Oct 10–13	436 (RV)	–	25%	3%	4%	1%	7%	1%	1%	17%	16%	3%	3% (Note: Castro and Ryan with 1%; Bennet, Bullock, Delaney, Messam, Sestak, Steyer and Williamson with 0%; refused with 1%)	19%
Morning Consult	Oct 7–13	15,683 (LV)	± 1.0%	32%	2%	5%	1%	6%	1%	3%	19%	21%	3%	9% (Note: Bennet, Bullock, Castro, Delaney, Ryan, Steyer and Williamson with 1%; someone else with 2%)	–
YouGov/Taubman National Poll	Oct 10–11	468 (LV)	–	25%	1%	6%	5%	4%	1%	3%	13%	23%	11%	8% (Note: Bennet, Castro, de Blasio, Delaney, Gillibrand, Moulton, Ryan and Williamson with 1%; Bullock, Gravel and Messam with 0%)	–
HarrisX	Oct 4–11	1,841 (LV)	± 2.3%	35%	2%	5%	1%	6%	1%	3%	15%	18%	2%	4% (Note: Bennet, Castro, and Steyer with 1%; Bullock, Delaney, Messam, Ryan, Sestak and Williamson with 0%; other and would not vote with 0%)	8%
Swayable	Oct 7–8	2,077 (LV)	± 2.0%	33%	3%	4%	1%	5%	2%	3%	16%	21%	3%	5% (Note: Delaney with 2%; Castro, Ryan, and Williamson with 1%)	–
Fox News	Oct 6–8	484 (LV)	± 4.5%	32%	2%	4%	1%	5%	2%	3%	17%	22%	2%	5% (Note: Bennet, Castro, Ryan, Steyer and Williamson with 1%; Bullock with less than 0.5%; Delaney, Messam and Sestak with 0%)	4%
YouGov/Economist	Oct 6–8	598 (LV)	–	25%	1%	5%	1%	5%	2%	1%	13%	28%	3%	6% (Note: Bullock with 2%; Castro, Delaney, Ryan and Steyer with 1%; Bennet, Messam, Sestak and Williamson with 0%; "would not vote" with 2%)	8%
The Hill/HarrisX	Oct 6–7	446 (RV)	± 4.6%	31%	1%	4%	1%	6%	2%	4%	17%	15%	2%	6% (Note: Steyer with 2%; Bennet, Castro, Ryan and Williamson with 1%; Delaney, Messam and other with 0%; Bullock and Sestak with no voters)	12%
Quinnipiac University	Oct 4–7	646 (RV)	± 4.7%	26%	2%	4%	0%	3%	2%	1%	16%	29%	3%	3% (Note: Bennet, Castro and Ryan with 1%; Bullock, Delaney, Messam, Sestak, Steyer, and Williamson with 0%; Someone else with 1%)	8%
Morning Consult	Sep 30 – Oct 6	16,529 (LV)	± 1.0%	33%	2%	5%	1%	6%	1%	3%	19%	21%	3%	9%	–
Avalanche Strategy/Civiqs	Oct 1–4	1,043 (LV)	– (Note: The result for this listing has not yet been released for the poll in question.)	27%	–	7%	–	6%	–	–	12%	29%	–	–	–
Raycroft Research	Oct 1–4	7,402 (LV)	–	18%	2%	4%	–	3%	1%	6%	17%	26%	6%	17% (Note: Castro with 2%; Bennet with 1%; Steyer with 0%; others and undecided with 14%)	–
HarrisX	Sep 27 – Oct 4	1,815 (LV)	± 2.3%	35%	2%	4%	1%	6%	1%	2%	13%	19%	2%	5% (Note: Bennet, Bullock, Castro, Messam, Ryan and Steyer with 1%; Delaney, Sestak, and Williamson with 0%; would not vote with 0%)	9%
YouGov Blue/ Data for Progress (Note: By the time of the sampling period, Data for Progress had endorsed the Elizabeth Warren 2020 presidential campaign.)	Sep 23 – Oct 4	1,276 (LV)	–	23%	2%	6%	1%	5%	1%	2%	15%	36%	3%	1% (Note: Delaney with 1%; Bennet, Bullock, Castro, Messam, Ryan, Sestak, Steyer, and Williamson with 0%)	–
IBD/TIPP	Sep 26 – Oct 3	341 (RV)	–	26%	0%	7%	1%	3%	1%	2%	10%	27%	3%	2% (Note: Castro and "Someone else" with 1%; Bennet, Bullock, Messam, Ryan and Steyer with 0%; Delaney, Sestak and Williamson with no voters)	16%
Winston Group	Sep 30 – Oct 2	≈670 (RV)	–	29%	1%	4%	1%	4%	1%	2%	12%	11%	1%	23% (Note: Castro with 2%; Bullock, Delaney, Ryan, Steyer and Williamson with 1%; "someone else" with 1%; Sestak with 0%; Bennet with no votes; "Do not plan to vote in the Democratic primary" with 15%)	10%
YouGov/Economist	Sep 28 – Oct 1	602 (LV)	–	22%	2%	7%	2%	5%	1%	3%	14%	26%	3%	4% (Note: Bennet with 2%; Castro and Steyer with 1%; Bullock, Delaney, Messam, Ryan, Sestak, and Williamson with 0%; would not vote with 3%)	8%

=== September 2019 ===
September 2019 polling
Poll source	Date(s) administered	Sample size	Margin of error	Joe Biden	Cory Booker	Pete Buttigieg	Kamala Harris	Beto O'Rourke	Bernie Sanders	Elizabeth Warren	Andrew Yang	Other	Undecided
GW Politics /YouGov	Sep 26–30	582 (LV)	–	18%	1%	5%	5%	1%	21%	28%	3%	12% (Note: Gabbard with 4%; Klobuchar with 2%; Bennet, Castro, de Blasio, Ryan, Steyer, and Williamson with 1%; Bullock, Delaney, and Sestak with 0%)	8%
Ipsos/Reuters	Sep 26–30	1,136 (RV)	–	21%	1%	4%	4%	2%	16%	15%	3%	4% (Note: Bennet, Gabbard, Klobuchar, and Williamson with 1%; Bullock, Castro, Delaney, Messam, Ryan, Sestak, and Steyer with 0%)	22%
Morning Consult	Sep 23–29	16,274 (LV)	± 1.0%	32%	3%	5%	6%	3%	19%	21%	3%	11% (Note: Bennet, Bullock, Castro, Delaney, Gabbard, Klobuchar, Ryan, Steyer, and Williamson with 1%; Someone else with 2%)	–
Monmouth University	Sep 23–29	434 (RV)	± 4.7%	25%	1%	5%	5%	1%	15%	28%	2%	5% (Note: Williamson with 2%; Castro, Klobuchar and Steyer with 1%; Bennet and Ryan with 0%; Bullock, Delaney, Gabbard and Sestak with less than 1%)	10%
HarrisX (Note: 'Likely voters' here combines the 'likely voter' and 'definite voter' categories in the linked poll.)	Sep 20–27	2,780 (LV)	± 2.3%	30%	2%	4%	5%	3%	16%	16%	2%	11% (Note: Castro with 2%; Bennet, Bullock, Delaney, Gabbard, Klobuchar, Ryan, Sestak, Steyer and Williamson with 1%; Messam and someone else with 0%; would not vote with 1%)	13%
Swayable	Sep 25–26	3,491 (LV)	± 2.0%	33%	2%	5%	6%	3%	16%	20%	2%	5% (Note: Ryan with 2%; Klobuchar, Castro, and Steyer with 1%)	–
Ipsos/Reuters	Sep 23–24	495 (RV)	–	22%	1%	4%	4%	1%	14%	17%	1%	8% (Note: Steyer with 2%; Castro, Gabbard and Klobuchar with 1%; Bennet, Bullock, Delaney, Messam, Ryan, Sestak and Williamson with 0%; others with 3%; won't vote with 3%)	22%
Harvard-Harris	Sep 22–24	693 (RV)	–	28%	2%	3%	6%	3%	16%	17%	3%	7% (Note: Castro and Steyer with 2%; Gabbard and Klobuchar with 1%; Delaney, Gillibrand, Gravel, Messam, Ryan and Williamson with 0%; others with 1%; "won't vote" with 3%)	9%
YouGov/Economist	Sep 22–24	608 (LV)	–	25%	0%	7%	6%	2%	16%	25%	2%	7% (Note: Bennet, Bullock, Castro, Delaney, Gabbard, Klobuchar, and Ryan with 1%; Messam, Sestak, Steyer and Williamson with 0%)	10%
Emerson College	Sep 21–23	462 (RV)	± 4.6%	25%	2%	6%	4%	1%	22%	23%	8%	8% (Note: Castro with 2%; Gabbard, Ryan, Sestak, and Williamson with 1%; Bennet, Bullock, Delaney, Klobuchar, Messam, and Steyer with 0%; "Someone else" with 2%)	–
Quinnipiac University	Sep 19–23	561 (RV)	± 4.9%	25%	0%	7%	3%	2%	16%	27%	2%	6% (Note: Castro and Klobuchar with 2%; Bennet and Gabbard with 1%; Bullock, Delaney, Messam, Ryan, Sestak, Steyer, and Williamson with 0%)	13%
David Binder Research	Sep 19–22	1,200 (LV)	± 2.8%	34%	3%	5%	7%	3%	15%	17%	2%	9% (Note: Gabbard with 2%; Bennet, Castro, Klobuchar, Ryan, Steyer and Williamson with 1%; Bullock, de Blasio, Delaney, Messam and Sestak with 0%; someone else with 1%)	5%
Morning Consult	Sep 16–22	17,377 (LV)	± 1.0%	32%	3%	5%	6%	3%	19%	20%	3%	12% (Note: Klobuchar with 2%; Bennet, Bullock, Castro, Delaney, Gabbard, Ryan, Steyer and Williamson with 1%; Someone else with 2%)	–
The Hill/HarrisX	Sep 20–21	440 (RV)	± 4.7%	31%	2%	5%	5%	4%	16%	14%	2%	12% (Note: "Other" with 1%; Castro with 3%; Klobuchar with 2%; Gabbard, Bennet, Delaney, Steyer, Messam, and Ryan with 1%; Sestak, Bullock and Williamson with 0%)	11%
Ipsos/Reuters	Sep 16–20	2,692 (A)	–	19%	2%	3%	4%	3%	17%	12%	3%	13% (Note: Castro, Gabbard, Klobuchar and Williamson with 1%; Messam, Sestak and Steyer with 0%; can't/won't vote with 6%; other with 3%)	23%
HarrisX	Sep 13–20	1,831 (RV)	± 2.3%	32%	3%	5%	6%	3%	15%	17%	2%	8% (Note: Bennet, de Blasio, Bullock, Castro, Delaney, Gabbard, Klobuchar and Steyer with 1%; Messam, Ryan, Sestak and Williamson with 0%)	9%
Swayable	Sep 16–18	3,140 (LV)	± 2.0%	33%	2%	6%	8%	3%	18%	16%	2%	5% (Note: Gabbard, Bullock, Klobuchar, Williamson, and Steyer with 1%)	–
Zogby Analytics	Sep 16–17	601 (LV)	± 4.0%	31%	4%	6%	5%	3%	17%	17%	2%	7% (Note: Klobuchar with 3%; "Someone else" and Castro with 2%)	6%
Fox News	Sep 15–17	480 (LV)	± 4.5%	29%	3%	5%	7%	4%	18%	16%	2%	5% (Note: Klobuchar with 2%; Bennet, Delaney and Steyer with 1%; Williamson with 0%; Bullock, Castro, de Blasio, Gabbard, Messam, Ryan and Sestak with less than 0.5%)	8%
YouGov/Economist	Sep 14–17	603 (LV)	–	25%	2%	8%	5%	3%	15%	19%	3%	8% (Note: Gabbard with 2%; Klobuchar, Castro, Bennet, Williamson, Bullock and Delaney with 1%; de Blasio, Steyer, Ryan, Messam and Sestak with 0%)	8%
NBC News/ Wall Street Journal	Sep 13–16	506 (LV)	± 4.4%	31%	2%	7%	5%	1%	14%	25%	4%	8% (Note: Klobuchar with 2%; Gabbard, Delaney, Steyer, Bennet, de Blasio and Castro with 1%; Bullock, Ryan and Williamson with less than 0.5%)	2%
SurveyUSA	Sep 13–16	1,017 (LV)	± 3.4%	33%	4%	5%	6%	4%	17%	19%	3%	3% (Note: "Some Other Democrat", Castro and Klobuchar with 1%)	6%
Civiqs	Sep 13–16	1,291 (LV)	± 3.1%	24%	1%	7%	6%	2%	14%	30%	2%	6% (Note: Gabbard with 2%; Bullock, Castro, Klobuchar, Steyer with 1%; Bennet, de Blasio, Delaney, Ryan and Williamson with 0%)	7%
Morning Consult	Sep 13–15	7,487 (LV)	± 1.0%	32%	3%	5%	6%	4%	20%	18%	3%	10% (Note: Klobuchar with 2%; Bullock, Castro, Delaney, Gabbard, Ryan, Steyer and Williamson with 1%; Bennet and de Blasio with 0%; Someone else with 1%)	–
Pew Research Center*	Sep 3–15	4,655 (RV)	–	27%	1%	5%	6%	2%	15%	22%	2%	15% (Note: Castro and Klobuchar with 1%; Messam with 0%; Bennet, Bullock, Delaney, Gabbard, Ryan, Sestak, Steyer and Williamson with no voters; "Other response" with 13%)	5%
HarrisX	Sep 6–13	2,808 (LV)	± 2.3%	31%	2%	4%	6%	3%	16%	12%	3%	12% (Note: Bennet, de Blasio, Bullock, Castro, Delaney, Gabbard, Klobuchar, Ryan, Sestak and Steyer with 1%; Messam, and Williamson and someone else with 0%; would not vote with 0%)	11%
	Sep 12	Third Democratic primary debate											
Civiqs	Sep 10–12	1,784 (LV)	–	23%	1%	7%	7%	2%	15%	28%	2%	6% (Note: Gabbard with 2%; Castro, Klobuchar, Ryan and Williamson with 1%; Bennet, de Blasio, Bullock, Delaney and Steyer with 0%)	7%
Democracy Corps	Sep 7–11	241 (LV)	–	30%	4%	4%	4%	1%	21%	19%	2%	8% (Note: Klobuchar and Gabbard with 2%; "Other", Castro, Williamson and Ryan with 1%; Bennet with 0%; de Blasio, Delaney, Steyer, Bullock, Messam and Sestak with less than 0.5%)	5%
Ipsos/Reuters	Sep 9–10	557 (RV)	–	22%	3%	4%	4%	2%	16%	11%	3%	7% (Note: "Other" with 2%; Gabbard, Klobuchar, Steyer, Castro and Ryan with 1%; Williamson, Sestak, Bullock, Messam, de Blasio and Bennet with 0%)	20%
YouGov/Economist	Sep 8–10	632 (LV)	–	24%	2%	5%	6%	1%	17%	24%	2%	11% (Note: Castro and Williamson with 2%; Bennet, Bullock, de Blasio, Delaney, Gabbard, Klobuchar, and Ryan with 1%; Messam, Sestak, and Steyer with 0%)	10%
McLaughlin & Associates	Sep 7–10	454 (LV)	–	28%	4%	6%	6%	3%	21%	12%	2%	11% (Note: Castro, Gabbard and Williamson with 2%; Bennet, de Blasio, Bullock, Klobuchar and Ryan with 1%; Delaney, Messam, Sestak, and Steyer with 0%)	9%
CNN/SSRS	Sep 5–9	908 (RV)	± 4.3%	24%	2%	6%	8%	5%	17%	18%	2%	10% (Note: Gabbard with 2%; Bennet, Castro, de Blasio, Klobuchar, Ryan, Williamson and Steyer with 1%; Bullock, Delaney and Sestak with less than 0.5%; "Someone else" with 1%)	6%
The Hill/HarrisX	Sep 7–8	454 (RV)	± 3.1%	27%	3%	4%	7%	3%	15%	11%	5%	10% (Note: Castro with 2%; Bennet, Bullock, Delaney, Gabbard, Klobuchar, Sestak, Steyer, and Other with 1%; de Blasio, Messam, Ryan, Williamson with 0%; Someone else with 2%)	15%
Morning Consult	Sep 2–8	17,824 (LV)	± 1.0%	33%	3%	5%	7%	3%	21%	16%	3%	9% (Note: Bennet, Castro, de Blasio, Delaney, Gabbard, Klobuchar, Ryan, Steyer, and Williamson with 1%; Bullock with 0%; Someone else with 2%)	–
L.A. Times/USC	Aug 12 – Sep 8	2,462 (LV)	± 2.0%	28%	2%	4%	8%	3%	13%	11%	2%	4% (Note: Gabbard and Klobuchar with 1%; Castro with 0%; others with 2%)	24%
YouGov/FairVote	Sep 2–6	1,002 (LV)	–	27%	2%	6%	8%	3%	16%	24%	2%	11% (Note: Gabbard with 2%; Bennet, de Blasio, Castro, Delaney, Klobuchar, Ryan, Steyer and Williamson with 1%; Bullock, Messam and Sestak and with 0%)	–
HarrisX	Aug 30 – Sep 6	2,878 (LV)	–	30%	2%	5%	7%	3%	18%	13%	2%	10% (Note: Bennet, Bullock, Castro, de Blasio, Gabbard, Klobuchar, Ryan, Steyer, and Williamson with 1%; Delaney, Messam, Sestak and someone else with 0%; would not vote with 1%)	12%
ABC News/ Washington Post	Sep 2–5	437 (A)	± 5.5%	27%	1%	4%	7%	3%	19%	17%	3%	4% (Note: de Blasio, Delaney, Gabbard and Klobuchar with 1%; Bennet, Bullock, Castro, Ryan, Steyer and Williamson with less than 0.5%, Other with less than 0.5%)	6%
YouGov/Economist	Sep 1–3	518 (LV)	–	26%	1%	6%	5%	1%	14%	21%	3%	12% (Note: Gabbard with 3%; Castro and de Blasio with 2%; Bennet, Delaney, Messam, Ryan and Williamson with 1%; Bullock, Klobuchar, Sestak and Steyer with 0%)	12%
Winston Group	Aug 31 – Sep 1	≈670 (RV)	–	30%	2%	4%	5%	2%	12%	11%	2%	19% (Note: Bullock, Castro, DeBlasio, Klobuchar, Gabbard, Ryan, Steyer and Williamson with 1%; Bennet, Delaney, Sestak and "someone else" with 0%; "Do not plan to vote in the Democratic primary" with 11%)	13%
Morning Consult	Aug 26 – Sep 1	16,736 (LV)	± 1.0%	32%	3%	5%	8%	3%	20%	16%	3%	10% (Note: Bennet, Bullock, Castro, Delaney, Gabbard, Klobuchar, Ryan, Steyer and Williamson with 1%, de Blasio with 0%; Someone else with 1%)	–

=== August 2019 ===
August 2019 polling
Poll source	Date(s) administered	Sample size	Margin of error	Joe Biden	Cory Booker	Pete Buttigieg	Kamala Harris	Beto O'Rourke	Bernie Sanders	Elizabeth Warren	Andrew Yang	Other	Undecided
HarrisX	Aug 23–30	3,114 (RV)	–	31%	3%	3%	6%	3%	15%	11%	2%	12% (Note: Castro with 2%; Bennet, Bullock, Delaney, Gabbard, Gillibrand, Klobuchar, Ryan, Williamson, Sestak, and Steyer with 1%; Messam with 0%)	12%
IBD/TIPP	Aug 22–30	360 (RV)	–	28%	4%	5%	6%	0%	12%	24%	1%	3% (Note: "Someone else", Klobuchar and Castro with 1%; Williamson, Gabbard, Bennet, Inslee, and Hickenlooper with 0%; Ryan, de Blasio, Delaney, Bullock, Gillibrand, Moulton, Messam, Sestak and Steyer with less than 0.5%)	15%
Claster Consulting	Aug 28–29	752 (RV)		22%	3%	3%	5%	4%	19%	14%	2%	10% (Note: Other with 6%; Klobuchar with 2%; Williamson & Castro with 1%; Steyer with 0%)	21%
Harvard-Harris	Aug 26–28	985 (RV)		32%	3%	4%	7%	4%	16%	13%	2%	6% (Note: Gabbard, Klobuchar, Castro, Steyer, Delaney and other with 1%; Williamson, Gillibrand, Messam, and Ryan with 0%)	11%
YouGov/Economist	Aug 24–27	1093 (RV)	± 3.1%	25%	2%	5%	8%	2%	14%	21%	2%	8% (Note: Gabbard with 2%; Bennet, Bullock, Castro, de Blasio, Klobuchar, Steyer, and Williamson with 1%; Delaney, Gillibrand, Messam, and Sestak with 0%)	12%
Emerson College	Aug 24–26	627 (RV)	± 3.9%	31%	3%	3%	10%	2%	24%	15%	4%	8% (Note: Gabbard with 3%; Castro and Klobuchar with 1%; Bennet, Bullock, de Blasio, Delaney, Gillibrand, Messam, Moulton, Ryan, Sestak, Steyer, and Williamson with 0%; Someone else with 1%)	–
Change Research	Aug 23–26	874 (LV)	± 3.3%	19%	3%	9%	6%	3%	22%	29%	2%	7% (Note: Castro and Gabbard with 2%; Klobuchar, Williamson and Steyer with 1%; Delaney, Bennet, de Blasio, Sestak, Bullock and Gillibrand with 0%)	–
Quinnipiac University	Aug 21–26	648 (RV)	± 4.6%	32%	1%	5%	7%	1%	15%	19%	3%	6% (Note: Bennet, Bullock, de Blasio, Gabbard, Klobuchar, and Williamson with 1%; Castro, Delaney, Gillibrand, Ryan, Sestak, and Steyer with 0%)	11%
Suffolk University/ USA Today	Aug 20–25	424 (LV)	± 4.8%	32%	2%	6%	6%	2%	12%	14%	3%	2% (Note: Castro and Ryan with 1%; Bennet, Bullock, de Blasio, Delaney, Gabbard, Gillibrand, Klobuchar, Messam, Sestak, Steyer, and Williamson with 0%)	21%
Morning Consult	Aug 19–25	17,303 (LV)	± 1.0%	33%	3%	5%	8%	3%	20%	15%	2%	9% (Note: Bennet, Bullock, Castro, de Blasio, Delaney, Gabbard, Gillibrand, Klobuchar, Ryan, Steyer and Williamson with 1% or less; Someone else with 2%)	–
The Hill/HarrisX	Aug 23–24	465 (RV)	–	30%	2%	4%	4%	3%	17%	14%	2%	9% (Note: Bullock with 2%; Bennet, Castro, Gabbard, Klobuchar, Messam, Steyer, and Williamson with 1%; de Blasio, Delaney, Gillibrand, and Sestak with 0%)	15%
Swayable	Aug 22–23	1,849 (LV)	± 2.0%	33%	2%	3%	9%	4%	18%	16%	1%	6% (Note: Steyer with 2%; Klobuchar, Gabbard, de Blasio, and Bullock with 1%)	–
HarrisX	Aug 16–23	3,132 (RV)	–	28%	4%	3%	8%	4%	17%	10%	2%	10% (Note: Bullock, Castro, de Blasio, Gabbard, Gillibrand, Inslee, Klobuchar, Ryan, Williamson, and Steyer with 1%; Bennet, Delaney, Messam, Moulton and Sestak with 0%)	13%
Echelon Insights	Aug 19–21	479 (RV)	–	30%	4%	3%	11%	4%	19%	11%	1%	1% (Note: Gabbard with 1%; Castro, Klobuchar, Gillibrand, Bennet, Delaney, de Blasio, Bullock, Ryan, Sestak, Steyer, Williamson, Messam and Moulton with 0%)	14%
YouGov/Economist	Aug 17–20	559 (LV)	–	22%	2%	7%	8%	3%	19%	17%	1%	7% (Note: Gabbard with 2%; Bullock, Castro, de Blasio, Gillibrand, and Inslee with 1%; Bennet, Delaney, Klobuchar, Messam, Moulton, Ryan, Sestak, Steyer and Williamson with 0%)	12%
Monmouth University	Aug 16–20	298 (RV)	± 5.7%	19%	4%	4%	8%	2%	20%	20%	3%	7% (Note: Castro and Williamson with 2%; de Blasio, Gabbard, Klobuchar with 1%; Bennet, Bullock, Gillibrand, Delaney, Inslee, Messam, Moulton, Ryan, Sestak, and Steyer with 0%)	10%
CNN/SSRS	Aug 15–18	402 (RV)	± 6.1%	29%	2%	5%	5%	3%	15%	14%	1%	10% (Note: Castro and Gabbard with 2%; Bullock, Klobuchar, Ryan, and Steyer with 1%; Bennet, de Blasio, Delaney, Gillibrand, Inslee, Messam, Moulton, Sestak and Williamson with 0%; Others with 2%)	10%
Morning Consult	Aug 12–18	17,115 (LV)	–	31%	3%	5%	9%	3%	20%	15%	3%	8% (Note: Bullock, Castro, Delaney, Gabbard, Gillibrand, Klobuchar, Ryan, Steyer and Williamson with 1%; Bennet, de Blasio, Inslee and Moulton with 0%; Someone else with 2%)	–
HarrisX	Aug 9–16	3,118 (RV)	–	29%	2%	4%	7%	4%	15%	11%	2%	10% (Note: Bennet, Castro, de Blasio, Delaney, Gabbard, Gillibrand, Hickenlooper, Klobuchar, Ryan, and Steyer with 1%; Bullock, Inslee, Messam, Moulton, Sestak, and Williamson with 0%)	13%
Fox News	Aug 11–13	483 (LV)	± 4.5%	31%	3%	3%	8%	2%	10%	20%	3%	10% (Note: Klobuchar with 2%; Castro, de Blasio, Delaney, Gabbard, Gillibrand, Steyer and Williamson with 1%; "other" with 1%; Messam and Sestak with 0%; Bennet, Bullock, Hickenlooper, Inslee, Moulton, and Ryan with less than 0.5%)	8%
YouGov/Economist	Aug 10–13	592 (LV)	–	21%	2%	5%	8%	5%	16%	20%	1%	8% (Note: Gabbard with 2%; Bennet, Klobuchar, Castro, Gillibrand, Steyer, and Williamson with 1%; Bullock, de Blasio, Delaney, Hickenlooper, Inslee, Messam, Moulton, Ryan and Sestak with 0%)	11%
Morning Consult	Aug 5–11	17,117 (LV)	± 1.0%	33%	3%	5%	9%	3%	20%	14%	2%	13% (Note: Bennet, Bullock, de Blasio, Castro, Delaney, Gabbard, Gillibrand, Hickenlooper, Inslee, Klobuchar, Moulton, Ryan, Steyer and Williamson with <1%; others with 2%)	–
The Hill/HarrisX	Aug 9–10	451 (RV)	–	31%	1%	4%	7%	4%	16%	10%	1%	14% (Note: Bullock, Castro, Klobuchar and Williamson with 2%; Delaney, Gabbard, Gillibrand, Ryan, Sestak, and Steyer with 1%; Bennet, de Blasio, Hickenlooper, Inslee, Messam, and Moulton with 0%)	10%
HarrisX	Aug 2–9	3,088 (RV)	–	28%	3%	4%	7%	3%	16%	10%	1%	12% (Note: Castro with 2%; Bennet, de Blasio, Gabbard, Gillibrand, Hickenlooper, Inslee, Klobuchar, Ryan, Steyer, and Williamson with 1%; Bullock, Delaney, Messam, Moulton, and Sestak with 0%)	16%
Swayable	Aug 5–6	1,958 (LV)	± 2.0%	31%	3%	5%	9%	3%	17%	15%	2%	5% (Note: Castro with 2%; Williamson, Klobuchar, and Bennet with 0%)	–
YouGov/Economist	Aug 3–6	573 (LV)	–	22%	1%	8%	8%	2%	13%	16%	2%	12% (Note: Gabbard with 3%; Bennet, Bullock, Castro, de Blasio, Delaney, Inslee, and Steyer with 1%; Gillibrand, Gravel, Hickenlooper, Klobuchar, Messam, Moulton, Ryan, Sestak, and Williamson with 0%)	14%
SurveyUSA	Aug 1–5	999 (LV)	± 4.1%	33%	1%	8%	9%	1%	20%	19%	0%	1% (Note: Klobuchar with 1%; Bennet, Bullock, Castro, de Blasio, Delaney, Gillibrand, Gravel, Hickenlooper, Inslee, Messam, Moulton, Ryan, Sestak, Steyer, and Williamson with 0%)	7%
Ipsos/Reuters	Aug 1–5	1,258 (A)	± 3.0%	22%	3%	4%	6%	2%	18%	9%	2%	13% (Note: Castro, de Blasio, Gabbard, Klobuchar, and Ryan with 1%; Bennet, Bullock, Delaney, Gillibrand, Gravel, Hickenlooper, Inslee, Messam, Moulton, Steyer, and Williamson with 0%; others with 3%)	21%
Quinnipiac University	Aug 1–5	807 (RV)	± 4.1%	32%	2%	5%	7%	2%	14%	21%	1%	3% (Note: Castro, Gabbard, and Klobuchar with 1%; Gillibrand, Inslee, Hickenlooper, Delaney, Williamson, Messam, Moulton, Ryan, Bennet, Bullock, de Blasio, Gravel, Sestak and Steyer with 0%)	10%
Change Research	Aug 2–4	1,450	± 3.0%	23%	2%	9%	7%	2%	23%	26%	2%	4% (Note: Gabbard with 2%; Castro and Klobuchar with 1%; Gillibrand, Moulton, Hickenlooper, Ryan, Williamson, Inslee, Steyer, Gravel, Bennet, de Blasio and Delaney with 0%)	–
Public Policy Polling	Aug 1–4	588	± 4.0%	36%	4%	4%	10%	–	12%	13%	2%	4% (Note: Bennet and Klobuchar with 2%)	14%
Morning Consult	Aug 1–4	9,845 (LV)	± 1.0%	33%	3%	6%	9%	3%	19%	15%	2%	10% (Note: Bullock, Castro, Delaney, Gabbard, Gillibrand, Klobuchar, Ryan, Steyer, and Williamson with 1%; Bennet, de Blasio, Hickenlooper, Inslee, Moulton with 0%; others with 1%)	–
Pew Research Center*	Jul 22 – Aug 4	1,757 (RV)	± 2.9%	26%	1%	5%	11%	1%	12%	16%	1%	9% (Note: "Other" with 7%; Castro and Klobuchar with 1%; de Blasio, Messam, Moulton and Sestak with 0%; Williamson, Gabbard, Gillibrand, Steyer, Bullock, Bennet, Hickenlooper, Inslee, Ryan and Delaney with less than 0.5%)	18%
HarrisX	Jul 31 – Aug 2	914 (RV)	± 3.4%	28%	3%	3%	8%	3%	16%	8%	2%	13% (Note: Gabbard with 3%; Bennet, Bullock, Castro, Delaney, Gillibrand, Inslee, Klobuchar, Ryan, Steyer, and Williamson with 1%; de Blasio, Gravel, Hickenlooper, Moulton, Messam, and Sestak with 0%)	13%
Morning Consult	Aug 1	2,419 (LV)	± 2.0%	32%	3%	6%	10%	3%	18%	15%	2%	9% (Note: Castro, Delaney, Gabbard, Gillibrand, Klobuchar, Ryan, Steyer, and Williamson with 1%; Bennet, Bullock, de Blasio, Hickenlooper, Inslee, and Moulton with 0%; others with 1%)	–
Harvard CAPS/Harris	Jul 31 – Aug 1	585	–	34%	2%	4%	9%	3%	17%	8%	1%	5% (Note: Castro, Gravel, Klobuchar, Ryan, and Steyer with 1%; Bloomberg, Delaney, Gabbard, Gillibrand, Hickenlooper, Inslee, Messam, Moulton, Swalwell, and Williamson with 0%)	14%
IBD/TIPP	Jul 25 – Aug 1	350 (RV)	–	30%	2%	6%	11%	1%	12%	17%	0%	7% (Note: Gabbard, Klobuchar, Inslee and Ryan with 1%; others with 3%)	10%

=== July 2019 ===
July 2019 polling
Poll source	Date(s) administered	Sample size	Margin of error	Joe Biden	Pete Buttigieg	Kamala Harris	Beto O'Rourke	Bernie Sanders	Elizabeth Warren	Other	Undecided
	Jul 31	Second night of the Second Democratic primary debate									
Morning Consult	Jul 31	2,410 (LV)	± 2.0%	34%	6%	10%	2%	19%	14%	14% (Note: Booker with 3%; Bullock, Castro, Delaney, Gabbard, Inslee, Klobuchar, Steyer, Williamson and Yang with 1%; Bennet, de Blasio, Gillibrand, Hickenlooper, Moulton and Ryan with 0%; others with 2%)	–
	Jul 30	First night of the Second Democratic primary debate									
YouGov/Economist	Jul 27–30	629 (LV)	–	26%	5%	10%	2%	13%	18%	11% (Note: Booker, Castro, and Gabbard with 2%; Bullock, de Blasio, Delaney, Klobuchar, and Yang with 1%; Bennet, Gillibrand, Gravel, Hickenlooper, Inslee, Messam, Moulton, Ryan, Sestak, Steyer, and Williamson with 0%)	11%
Emerson College	Jul 27–29	520	± 4.2%	33%	6%	11%	4%	20%	14%	11% (Note: Steyer and Yang with 2%; de Blasio, Castro, Delaney, Hickenlooper, Gabbard, and Gillibrand with 1%; Bennet, Booker, Bullock, Gravel, Inslee, Klobuchar, Messam, Moulton, Ryan, Sestak, and Williamson with 0%; others with 1%)	–
HarrisX	Jul 27–29	884 (RV)	–	32%	3%	7%	4%	15%	9%	14% (Note: Castro and Steyer with 2%; Bennet, Booker, de Blasio, Delaney, Gillibrand, Gravel, Klobuchar, Ryan, and Yang with 1%; Bullock, Gabbard, Hickenlooper, Inslee, Messam, Sestak, and Williamson with 0%)	14%
The Hill/HarrisX	Jul 27–28	444 (RV)	± 4.7%	34%	5%	9%	4%	20%	12%	9% (Note: Booker, Bullock, Castro, Delaney, Klobuchar, Ryan, Steyer, and Yang with 1%; Bennet, de Blasio, Gabbard, Gillibrand, Gravel, Hickenlooper, Inslee, Messam, Moulton, Sestak, and Williamson with 0%; others with 1%)	8%
Quinnipiac University	Jul 25–28	579 (RV)	± 5.1%	34%	6%	12%	2%	11%	15%	6% (Note: Yang with 2%; Booker, Klobuchar, and Williamson with 1%; Bennet, Bullock, Castro, de Blasio, Delaney, Gabbard, Gillibrand, Gravel, Hickenlooper, Inslee, Messam, Moulton, Ryan, Sestak, and Steyer with 0%)	12%
McLaughlin & Associates	Jul 23–28	468	–	28%	3%	10%	4%	15%	9%	18% (Note: Booker with 3%; Yang with 2%; Bullock, Castro, de Blasio, Delaney, Gabbard, Gillibrand, Hickenlooper, Inslee, Ryan, Steyer, and Williamson with 1%; Bennet, Klobuchar, Messam, and Moulton with <1%)	14%
Morning Consult	Jul 22–28	16,959 (LV)	± 1.0%	33%	5%	12%	3%	18%	13%	18% (Note: Booker with 3%; Yang with 2%; Bennet, Bullock, de Blasio, Castro, Delaney, Gabbard, Gillibrand, Hickenlooper, Inslee, Klobuchar, Moulton, Ryan, Steyer and Williamson with <1%; others with 2%)	–
Democracy Corps	Jul 18–28	471	–	31%	8%	12%	2%	22%	15%	10% (Note: Klobuchar with 2%; Booker, Gabbard, Gillibrand, and Yang with 1%; Castro, de Blasio, Delaney, Bennet, and Ryan with 0%; others with 1%)	3%
Echelon Insights	Jul 23–27	510	± 4.2%	33%	5%	11%	3%	14%	10%	9% (Note: Gabbard with 2%; Booker, Bullock, Castro, Gillibrand, and Yang with 1%; others with 2%)	16%
Change Research	Jul 23–26	1,204	± 2.8%	20%	9%	15%	2%	20%	22%	12% (Note: Klobuchar and Yang with 3%; Gabbard with 2%; Booker, Castro, Gillibrand, and Gravel with 1%; Bennet, de Blasio, Delaney, Hickenlooper, Inslee, Moulton, Steyer, and Williamson with 0%)	–
USC Dornsife/Los Angeles Times	Jul 12–25	1,827	± 3.0%	28%	5%	10%	3%	11%	10%	6% (Note: Booker, Castro, de Blasio, Klobuchar, Ryan, and Yang with 1%; Bennet, Bullock, Delaney, Gabbard, Gillibrand, Gravel, Hickenlooper, Inslee, Messam, Moulton, Sestak, Steyer, and Williamson with 0%)	25%
Fox News	Jul 21–23	455 (LV)	± 4.5%	33%	5%	10%	2%	15%	12%	15% (Note: Klobuchar and Yang with 3%; Booker and Hickenlooper with 2%; Castro, de Blasio, Delaney, Gillibrand, and Steyer with 1%; Moulton and Sestak with 0%; Bennet, Bullock, Gabbard, Inslee, Messam, Ryan and Williamson with less than 0.5%)	7%
YouGov/Economist	Jul 21–23	600 (LV)	–	25%	6%	9%	2%	13%	18%	16% (Note: Castro with 3%; Booker, Gabbard, and Yang with 2%; de Blasio, Bullock, Klobuchar, and Steyer with 1%; Bennet, Delaney, Gillibrand, Gravel, Hickenlooper, Inslee, Messam, Moulton, Ryan, Sestak, and Williamson with 0%)	11%
Morning Consult	Jul 15–21	17,285 (LV)	± 1.0%	33%	5%	13%	3%	18%	14%	10% (Note: Booker and Yang with 2%; Bennet, de Blasio, Bullock, Castro, Delaney, Gabbard, Gillibrand, Hickenlooper, Inslee, Klobuchar, Ryan, Steyer, Moulton and Williamson with <1%; others with 2%)	–
HarrisX	Jul 15–17	910 (RV)	–	26%	4%	10%	4%	14%	9%	11% (Note: Booker with 2%; Castro, Delaney, Gillibrand, Hickenlooper, Klobuchar, Moulton, Ryan, Steyer, and Yang with 1%; Bennet, de Blasio, Bullock, Gabbard, Gravel, Inslee, Messam, Sestak, and Williamson with 0%)	18%
YouGov/Economist	Jul 14–16	572 (LV)	–	23%	7%	10%	2%	13%	15%	13% (Note: Booker with 3%; de Blasio with 2%; Bennet, Bullock, Castro, Gabbard, Gillibrand, Klobuchar, Steyer, and Yang with 1%; Delaney, Gravel, Hickenlooper, Inslee, Messam, Moulton, Ryan, Sestak, and Williamson with 0%)	14%
NBC News/SurveyMonkey	Jul 2–16	5,548 (RV)	± 2.0%	25%	8%	14%	3%	16%	16%	14% (Note: Booker with 3%; Castro and Yang with 2%; Bennet, de Blasio, Gabbard, Gillibrand, Klobuchar, Ryan, and Williamson with 1%; Bullock, Delaney, Gravel, Hickenlooper, Inslee, Messam, Moulton, and Sestak with 0%)	5%
Morning Consult	Jul 8–14	16,504 (LV)	± 1.0%	32%	5%	13%	3%	19%	14%	10% (Note: Booker and Yang with 2%; Bennet, de Blasio, Bullock, Castro, Delaney, Gabbard, Gillibrand, Hickenlooper, Inslee, Klobuchar, Ryan, Swalwell, Moulton and Williamson with <1%; others with 2%)	–
TheHillHarrisX	Jul 12–13	446 (RV)	± 3.1%	29%	1%	11%	3%	16%	9%	13% (Note: Booker, Bullock, Castro, de Blasio, Delaney, Gabbard, Gillibrand, Gravel, Klobuchar, Messam, Moulton and Ryan with 1%; Bennet, Hickenlooper, Inslee, Sestak, Steyer, Williamson, and Yang with 0%; others with 1%)	17%
NBC News/Wall Street Journal	Jul 7–9	400 (LV)	± 4.9%	26%	7%	13%	2%	13%	19%	10% (Note: Yang with 2%; Bennet, Booker, Castro, Delaney, Hickenlooper, Inslee, Klobuchar and Williamson with 1%; others with 0%)	8%
YouGov/Economist	Jul 7–9	592 (LV)	–	22%	6%	15%	1%	12%	18%	11% (Note: Booker, Castro and Gabbard with 2%; Bullock, de Blasio, Hickenlooper, Klobuchar, and Yang with 1%; Bennet, Delaney, Gillibrand, Gravel, Inslee, Messam, Moulton, Ryan, Sestak, Swalwell, and Williamson with 0%)	13%
Emerson College	Jul 6–8	481	± 4.4%	30%	5%	15%	4%	15%	15%	16% (Note: Yang with 3%; Booker and Gabbard with 2%; Bennet, Bullock, Gravel, Inslee, Klobuchar, and Swalwell with 1%; de Blasio, Castro, Delaney, Gillibrand, Hickenlooper, Messam, Ryan, Sestak, and Williamson with 0%; others with 3%)	–
Swayable	Jul 5–7	1,921 (LV)	± 2.0%	28%	6%	16%	4%	18%	12%	7% (Note: Booker with 3%; Gabbard with 2%; Yang and Castro with 1%)	–
Morning Consult	Jul 1–7	16,599 (LV)	± 1.0%	31%	6%	14%	3%	19%	13%	15% (Note: Booker with 2%; Bullock, Castro, de Blasio, Delaney, Gabbard, Gillibrand, Hickenlooper, Klobuchar, Ryan, Williamson, and Yang with 1%; Bennet, Inslee, and Moulton with 0%; others with 2%)	–
YouGov/Economist	Jun 30 – Jul 2	631 (LV)	–	21%	9%	13%	3%	10%	18%	11% (Note: Booker and Castro with 2%; Bennet, Bullock, de Blasio, Gabbard, Gillibrand, Inslee, and Klobuchar with 1%; Delaney, Gravel, Hickenlooper, Messam, Moulton, Ryan, Sestak, Swalwell, Williamson, and Yang with 0%)	12%
Ipsos/Reuters	Jun 28 – Jul 2	1,367	± 3.0%	22%	3%	10%	3%	16%	9%	9% (Note: Yang with 2%; Booker, Bullock, Castro, Gillibrand, and Ryan with 1%; Bennet, de Blasio, Delaney, Gabbard, Gravel, Hickenlooper, Inslee, Klobuchar, Messam, Moulton, Sestak, Swalwell, and Williamson with 0%; others with 2%)	21%
YouGov Blue/Data for Progress	Jun 27 – Jul 2	1,522	–	23%	7%	17%	2%	15%	22%	10% (Note: Booker and Yang with 2%; Castro, Delaney, Gabbard, Hickenlooper, Inslee, and Klobuchar with 1%; Bennet, Bullock, de Blasio, Gillibrand, Gravel, Messam, Moulton, Ryan, Sestak, Swalwell, and Williamson with 0%)	–
HarrisX	Jun 29 – Jul 1	882 (RV)	± 3.4%	28%	4%	13%	3%	14%	9%	15% (Note: Booker and Castro with 2%; Bennet, de Blasio, Delaney, Gabbard, Gillibrand, Hickenlooper, Klobuchar, Ryan, Swalwell, Williamson, and Yang with 1%; Bullock, Gravel, Inslee, Messam, Moulton, and Sestak with 0%; others with 0%)	12%
ABC News/Washington Post	Jun 28 – Jul 1	460 (A)	± 5.5%	29%	4%	11%	2%	23%	11%	13% (Note: Castro with 4%; Klobuchar with 2%; Bennet, Booker, Gabbard, Hickenlooper, Inslee, Yang and Williamson with 1%; de Blasio, Delaney, Moulton, and Swalwell with 0%; others with less than 0.5%)	6%
Change Research	Jun 28 – Jul 1	1,185	± 2.9%	18%	10%	21%	2%	17%	22%	8% (Note: Yang with 2%; Castro, Delaney, Gabbard, Gillibrand, Klobuchar, and Williamson with 1%; Bennet, Booker, Bullock, de Blasio, Gravel, Hickenlooper, Inslee, Messam, Moulton, Ryan, Sestak, and Swalwell with 0%)	–
Quinnipiac University	Jun 28 – Jul 1	554 (RV)	± 5.0%	22%	4%	20%	1%	13%	14%	7% (Note: Booker with 3%; Castro, Gabbard, Klobuchar, and Yang with 1%; Bennet, Bullock, de Blasio, Delaney, Gillibrand, Gravel, Hickenlooper, Inslee, Messam, Moulton, Ryan, Sestak, Swalwell, and Williamson with <1%; others with <1%)	12%

=== April–June 2019 ===
April–June 2019 polling
Poll source	Date(s) administered	Sample size	Margin of error	Joe Biden	Cory Booker	Pete Buttigieg	Kamala Harris	Beto O'Rourke	Bernie Sanders	Elizabeth Warren	Other	Undecided
CNN/SSRS	Jun 28–30	656 (RV)	± 4.7%	22%	3%	4%	17%	3%	14%	15%	8% (Note: Klobuchar with 2%; Castro, de Blasio, Gabbard, and Yang with 1%; Bennet, Delaney, Gillibrand, Hickenlooper, Inslee, Moulton, Ryan, Swalwell, and Williamson with <1%; Bullock and Messam with 0%; others with 2%)	9%
HarrisX	Jun 28–30	909 (RV)	± 3.4%	28%	2%	4%	11%	3%	14%	8%	10% (Note: Castro with 2%; Delaney, Gabbard, Gillibrand, Hickenlooper, Inslee, Klobuchar, Ryan, and Yang with 1%; Bennet, Bullock, de Blasio, Gravel, Messam, Moulton, Sestak, Swalwell, and Williamson with 0%; others with 0%)	15%
Morning Consult/FiveThirtyEight	Jun 27–30	2,485 (LV)	± 2%	31%	2.5%	5.9%	16.8%	2.1%	16.8%	14.4%	6.7% (Note: Castro with 1.7%; Yang with 0.8%; Klobuchar and Gabbard with 0.6%; Bennet and Gillibrand with 0.5%; Delaney and Hickenlooper with 0.4%; Ryan with 0.3%; de Blasio and Inslee with 0.2%; Swalwell and Williamson with 0.1%; others with 0.3%)	3.9%
Harvard-Harris	Jun 26–29	845	–	34%	3%	3%	9%	2%	15%	11%	10% (Note: Gabbard with 2%; Bloomberg, Castro, Delaney, Gillibrand, Hickenlooper, Klobuchar, Ryan, and Yang with 1%; Gravel, Inslee, Messam, Moulton, Swalwell, and Williamson with 0%; others with 0%)	9%
Morning Consult	Jun 27–28	2,407 (LV)	± 2%	33%	3%	6%	12%	2%	19%	12%	13% (Note: Yang with 2%; Bullock, Castro, de Blasio, Delaney, Gabbard, Gillibrand, Klobuchar, Moulton, and Ryan with 1%; Bennet, Hickenlooper, Inslee, Swalwell, and Williamson with 0%; others with 2%)	–
	Jun 27	Second night of the first Democratic primary debate										
Morning Consult/FiveThirtyEight	Jun 26–27	2,041 (LV)	± 2%	33.7%	3.6%	4.8%	6.6%	3.1%	17.8%	17.7%	9.6% (Note: Castro with 2.5%; Yang with 1.3%; Klobuchar with 0.9%; Gabbard, Gillibrand and Ryan with 0.7%; de Blasio, Delaney, and Inslee with 0.6%; Hickenlooper with 0.4%; Bennet with 0.3%; Swalwell with 0.1%; Williamson with 0%; someone else with 0.2%)	3.3%
	Jun 26	First night of the first Democratic primary debate										
YouGov Blue/Data for Progress	Jun 25–26	1,402	–	30%	2%	7%	7%	3%	16%	24%	7% (Note: Yang with 2%; Castro, Gabbard, Hickenlooper, Inslee, and Klobuchar with 1%; Bennet, Bullock, de Blasio, Delaney, Gillibrand, Gravel, Messam, Moulton, Ryan, Sestak, Swalwell, and Williamson with 0%)	–
HarrisX	Jun 24–26	892 (RV)	± 3.4%	29%	1%	3%	6%	4%	17%	9%	12% (Note: Inslee with 2%; Bennet, Castro, de Blasio, Delaney, Gillibrand, Hickenlooper, Klobuchar, Moulton, Williamson, and Yang with 1%; Bullock, Gabbard, Gravel, Messam, Ryan, Sestak, and Swalwell with 0%; others with 0%)	15%
Morning Consult/FiveThirtyEight	Jun 19–26	7,150 (LV)	± 1%	38.5%	2.8%	6.9%	7.9%	3.9%	16.3%	12.7%	5.3% (Note: Yang with 1%; Gillibrand with 0.8%; Castro and Gabbard with 0.6%; Inslee with 0.5%; Hickenlooper with 0.4%; Bennet, Delaney, Klobuchar, Ryan and Swalwell with 0.2%; Williamson with 0.1%; de Blasio with 0%; someone else with 0.3%)	5.5%
Echelon Insights	Jun 22–25	484	–	32%	2%	9%	6%	3%	15%	11%	6% (Note: De Blasio, Hickenlooper, Inslee, Klobuchar, and Yang with 1%; Bennet, Bullock, Castro, Delaney, Gabbard, Gillibrand, Gravel, Messam, Moulton, Ryan, Swalwell, and Williamson with 0%; others with 1%)	19%
YouGov/Economist	Jun 22–25	522 (LV)	–	24%	2%	5%	7%	3%	15%	18%	11% (Note: Gabbard with 3%; Bennet, Bullock, Castro, de Blasio, Gillibrand, Klobuchar, Moulton, and Yang with 1%; Delaney, Gravel, Hickenlooper, Inslee, Messam, Ryan, Swalwell, and Williamson with 0%)	12%
Emerson College	Jun 21–24	457	± 4.5%	34%	3%	6%	7%	1%	27%	14%	8% (Note: Gillibrand, Gravel, Inslee, Klobuchar, and Yang with 1%; Bennet, Bullock, de Blasio, Castro, Delaney, Gabbard, Hickenlooper, Messam, Moulton, Ryan, Swalwell, and Williamson with 0%; others with 3%)	–
McLaughlin & Associates	Jun 18–24	459	–	34%	2%	6%	6%	4%	17%	11%	11% (Note: De Blasio, Gabbard, Inslee, Klobuchar, Messam, Moulton, Swalwell, and Yang with 1%; Bennet, Bullock, Castro, Delaney, Gillibrand, Gravel, Hickenlooper, Ryan, and Williamson with 0%)	12%
Morning Consult	Jun 17–23	16,188 (LV)	± 1.0%	38%	3%	7%	6%	4%	19%	13%	15% (Note: Yang with 2%; Bennet, Bullock, Castro, de Blasio, Delaney, Gabbard, Gillibrand, Hickenlooper, Inslee, Klobuchar, and Ryan with 1%; Moulton, Swalwell, and Williamson with 0%; others with 2%)	–
Change Research	Jun 19–21	1,071	–	24%	2%	13%	8%	2%	22%	22%	5% (Note: Castro, Gabbard, Hickenlooper, Klobuchar, and Yang with 1%; Bennet, Bullock, de Blasio, Delaney, Gillibrand, Gravel, Inslee, Messam, Moulton, Ryan, Sestak, Swalwell, and Williamson with 0%)	–
YouGov/Economist	Jun 16–18	576 (LV)	–	26%	2%	9%	7%	4%	13%	14%	9% (Note: Bennet, Bullock, Castro, de Blasio, Delaney, Gabbard, Gillibrand, Klobuchar, and Yang with 1%; Gravel, Hickenlooper, Inslee, Messam, Moulton, Ryan, Swalwell, and Williamson with 0%)	15%
Monmouth University	Jun 12–17	306	± 5.6%	32%	2%	5%	8%	3%	14%	15%	7% (Note: Yang with 2%; de Blasio, Gabbard, Inslee, Klobuchar, and Williamson with 1%; Castro, Gillibrand, and Ryan with <1%; Bennet, Bullock, Delaney, Gravel, Hickenlooper, Messam, Moulton, and Swalwell with 0%; others with 0%)	11%
Morning Consult	Jun 10–16	17,226 (LV)	± 1.0%	38%	3%	7%	7%	4%	19%	11%	12% (Note: Bennet, Castro, Delaney, Gabbard, Gillibrand, Hickenlooper, Klobuchar, Ryan, Williamson, and Yang with 1%; Bullock, de Blasio, Inslee, Moulton, and Swalwell with 0%; others with 2%)	–
The Hill/HarrisX	Jun 14–15	424 (RV)	± 4.8%	35%	3%	4%	5%	6%	13%	7%	10% (Note: Castro with 2%; Bennet, Bullock, Delaney, Klobuchar, Messam, Ryan, and Swalwell with 1%; de Blasio, Gabbard, Gillibrand, Gravel, Hickenlooper, Inslee, Moulton, Williamson, and Yang with 0%; others with 1%)	17%
Suffolk University/USA Today	Jun 11–15	385	± 5.0%	30%	2%	9%	8%	2%	15%	10%	5% (Note: Bullock, Castro, Hickenlooper, Ryan, and Yang with 1%; Bennet, de Blasio, Delaney, Gabbard, Gillibrand, Gravel, Inslee, Klobuchar, Messam, Moulton, Swalwell, Williamson with 0%; others with 0%)	17%
WPA Intelligence (R) (Note: Poll sponsored by Club for Growth Action.)	Jun 10–13	1,000	± 3.1%	35%	3%	8%	9%	4%	14%	10%	3% (Note: Castro, Klobuchar, and Yang with 1%; Bennet, Bullock, Delaney, Gabbard, Gillibrand, Gravel, Hickenlooper, Inslee, Messam, and Moulton with <1%; de Blasio, Ryan, Swalwell, and Williamson with 0%)	13%
Fox News	Jun 9–12	449 (LV)	± 4.5%	32%	3%	8%	8%	4%	13%	9%	9% (Note: Klobuchar and Yang with 2%; Castro, Delaney, Gabbard, Gillibrand, and Ryan with 1%; Bennet, Bullock, de Blasio, Gravel, Hickenlooper, Inslee, Messam, Moulton, and Swalwell with less than 0.5%; Williamson with 0%; others with <1%)	10%
YouGov/Economist	Jun 9–11	513 (LV)	–	26%	2%	8%	6%	3%	12%	16%	8% (Note: Bennet, Castro, de Blasio, Gillibrand, Inslee, Klobuchar, Swalwell, and Yang with 1%; Bullock, Delaney, Gabbard, Gravel, Hickenlooper, Messam, Moulton, Ryan, and Williamson with 0%)	14%
Quinnipiac University	Jun 6–10	503	± 5.4%	30%	1%	8%	7%	3%	19%	15%	5% (Note: Klobuchar, Ryan, and Yang with 1%; Bennet, Bullock, Castro, de Blasio, Delaney, Gabbard, Gillibrand, Gravel, Hickenlooper, Inslee, Messam, Moulton, Swalwell, and Williamson with <1%; others with <1%)	13%
Change Research	Jun 5–10	1,621	± 2.6%	26%	1%	14%	8%	3%	21%	19%	7% (Note: Abrams, Gabbard, Gillibrand, Gravel, Klobuchar, Ryan, and Yang with 1%; Bennet, Bullock, Castro, de Blasio, Delaney, Hickenlooper, Inslee, Moulton, Swalwell, and Williamson with 0%)	–
Morning Consult	Jun 3–9	17,012 (LV)	± 1.0%	37%	3%	7%	7%	4%	19%	11%	14% (Note: Klobuchar with 2%; Bennet, Bullock, Castro, Delaney, Gabbard, Gillibrand, Hickenlooper, Inslee, Ryan, and Yang with 1%; de Blasio, Moulton, Swalwell, and Williamson with 0%; others with 2%)	–
Ipsos/Reuters	May 29 – Jun 5	2,525	–	30%	2%	5%	6%	4%	15%	8%	7% (Note: De Blasio, Gabbard, Hickenlooper, Klobuchar, Ryan, and Yang with 1%; Bennet, Bullock, Castro, Delaney, Gillibrand, Gravel, Inslee, Messam, Moulton, Swalwell, and Williamson with 0%; others with 1%)	13%
YouGov/Economist	Jun 2–4	550 (LV)	–	27%	2%	9%	8%	2%	16%	11%	8% (Note: De Blasio with 2%; Bullock, Delaney, Gabbard, Hickenlooper, Klobuchar, and Yang with 1%; Bennet, Castro, Gillibrand, Gravel, Inslee, Messam, Moulton, Ryan, Swalwell, and Williamson with 0%)	15%
Park Street Strategies	May 24 – Jun 4	600 (LV)	± 4%	32%	1%	7%	12%	1%	15%	13%	19% (Note: Klobuchar with 2%; Castro and Yang with 1%; no other candidate with supporter greater than or equal to 0.5%)	–
Swayable	Jun 1–3	977 (LV)	± 3.0%	40%	4%	6%	8%	3%	20%	7%	7% (Note: Gabbard with 2%; Delaney, Castro, Klobuchar, Hickenlooper, and Moulton with 1%)	–
Avalanche Strategy	May 31 – Jun 3	1,109	–	29%	–	13%	12%	4%	17%	16%	–	–
The Hill/HarrisX	Jun 1–2	431 (RV)	± 4.7%	35%	3%	8%	4%	4%	16%	5%	5% (Note: Bennet, Hickenlooper, Klobuchar, and Williamson with 1%; Bullock, Castro, de Blasio, Delaney, Gabbard, Gillibrand, Gravel, Inslee, Messam, Moulton, Ryan, Swalwell, and Yang with 0%; others with 1%)	17%
Morning Consult	May 27 – Jun 2	16,587 (LV)	± 1.0%	38%	3%	7%	7%	4%	19%	10%	15% (Note: Bennet, Bullock, Castro, de Blasio, Delaney, Gabbard, Gillibrand, Hickenlooper, Inslee, Klobuchar, Ryan, Williamson, and Yang with 1%; Moulton and Swalwell with 0%; others with 2%)	–
CNN/SSRS	May 28–31	412	± 6.0%	32%	3%	5%	8%	5%	18%	7%	12% (Note: Castro and Klobuchar with 2%; Bennet, Gabbard, Gillibrand, Inslee, Ryan, and Yang with 1%; de Blasio, Delaney, Hickenlooper, and Williamson with <1%; Bullock, Messam, Moulton, and Swalwell with 0%; others with 2%)	8%
Harvard-Harris	May 29–30	471	–	36%	3%	5%	8%	4%	17%	5%	9% (Note: Bloomberg, Castro, Delaney, Gravel, Hickenlooper, Inslee, Ryan, and Yang with 1%; Gabbard, Gillibrand, Klobuchar, Messam, Moulton, Swalwell, and Williamson with 0%; others with 1%)	12%
Morning Consult	May 20–26	16,368 (LV)	± 1.0%	38%	3%	7%	7%	4%	20%	9%	13% (Note: Bennet, Bullock, Castro, Delaney, Gabbard, Gillibrand, Hickenlooper, Klobuchar, Ryan, Williamson, and Yang with 1%; de Blasio, Inslee, Moulton, and Swalwell with 0%; others with 2%)	–
HarrisX	May 23–25	881 (RV)	± 3.4%	33%	3%	5%	6%	3%	15%	7%	8% (Note: Castro, Delaney, Gillibrand, Hickenlooper, Inslee, Klobuchar, Ryan, and Yang with 1%; Gabbard, Gravel, Messam, Moulton, Swalwell, and Williamson with 0%; others with 0%)	14%
Echelon Insights	May 20–21	447	–	38%	2%	5%	5%	5%	16%	5%	9% (Note: Klobuchar with 2%; Bennet, Castro, Gillibrand, Messam, and Yang with 1%; Bullock, de Blasio, Delaney, Gabbard, Hickenlooper, Inslee, Moulton, Ryan, Swalwell, and Williamson with 0%; others with 2%)	16%
Change Research	May 18–21	1,420	± 2.6%	31%	2%	9%	8%	4%	22%	15%	8% (Note: Abrams and Yang with 2%; de Blasio, Gabbard, Gillibrand, and Klobuchar with 1%; Bennet, Bullock, Castro, Delaney, Gravel, Hickenlooper, Inslee, Messam, Moulton, Swalwell, and Williamson with 0%)	–
Monmouth University	May 16–20	334	± 5.4%	33%	1%	6%	11%	4%	15%	10%	8% (Note: Klobuchar with 3%; Castro, de Blasio, Gabbard, Williamson, and Yang with 1%; Bennet, Delaney, Gillibrand, Hickenlooper, Inslee, and Ryan with <1%; Bullock, Gravel, Messam, Moulton, and Swalwell with 0%; others with 0%)	9%
Quinnipiac University	May 16–20	454	± 5.6%	35%	3%	5%	8%	2%	16%	13%	5% (Note: Klobuchar with 2%; Castro, Gabbard, and Yang with 1%; Bennet, Bullock, de Blasio, Delaney, Gillibrand, Hickenlooper, Inslee, Messam, Moulton, Ryan, Swalwell, and Williamson with <1%; others with <1%)	11%
Morning Consult	May 13–19	14,830 (LV)	± 1.0%	39%	3%	6%	8%	4%	19%	9%	13% (Note: Bennet, Bullock, Castro, de Blasio, Delaney, Gabbard, Gillibrand, Hickenlooper, Klobuchar, Ryan, and Yang with 1%; Inslee, Moulton, Swalwell, and Williamson with 0%; others with 2%)	–
The Hill/HarrisX	May 18–19	448 (RV)	± 4.6%	33%	1%	6%	6%	5%	14%	8%	8% (Note: Castro, Gillibrand, Klobuchar, Moulton, Ryan, and Yang with 1%; Bennet, Bullock, de Blasio, Delaney, Gabbard, Gravel, Hickenlooper, Inslee, Messam, Swalwell, and Williamson with 0%; others with 2%)	19%
Fox News	May 11–14	469 (LV)	± 4.5%	35%	3%	6%	5%	4%	17%	9%	10% (Note: Castro and Klobuchar with 2%; Delaney, Gabbard, Inslee, Ryan, Williamson, and Yang with 1%; Bennet, Bullock, Gillibrand, Gravel, Hickenlooper, Messam, and Swalwell with less than 0.5%; Moulton with 0%; others with less than 0.5%)	8%
Ipsos/Reuters	May 10–14	1,132	± 3.0%	29%	2%	4%	6%	6%	13%	6%	10% (Note: Bennet, Castro, de Blasio, Gillibrand, Hickenlooper, Inslee, Klobuchar, Ryan, and Yang with 1%; Bullock, Delaney, Gabbard, Messam, Moulton, Swalwell, and Williamson with 0%; others with 1%)	16%
Emerson College	May 10–13	429	± 4.7%	33%	1%	8%	10%	3%	25%	10%	12% (Note: Castro and Gillibrand with 2%; Bennet, Gabbard, Gravel, Klobuchar, Moulton, and Yang with 1%; Delaney, Hickenlooper, Inslee, Messam, Ryan, Swalwell, and Williamson with 0%; others with 2%)	–
HarrisX	May 8–13	2,207 (RV)	± 3.1%	39%	4%	5%	6%	5%	20%	8%	11% (Note: Klobuchar with 2%; Castro, Delaney, Gillibrand, Gravel, Hickenlooper, Ryan, Williamson, and Yang with 1%; Gabbard, Inslee, Messam, Moulton, and Swalwell with 0%)	–
Morning Consult	May 6–12	15,342 (LV)	± 1.0%	39%	3%	6%	8%	5%	19%	8%	12% (Note: Klobuchar with 2%; Bennet, Castro, Gabbard, Gillibrand, Hickenlooper, Inslee, Ryan, and Yang with 1%; Bullock, de Blasio, Delaney, Moulton, and Swalwell with 0%; others with 2%)	–
McLaughlin & Associates	May 7–11	360	–	30%	5%	4%	7%	5%	19%	7%	13% (Note: Klobuchar and Yang with 2%; Bennet, Castro, Gillibrand, Gravel, Moulton, and Ryan with 1%; Bullock, de Blasio, Delaney, Gabbard, Hickenlooper, Inslee, Messam, Swalwell, and Williamson with 0%)	13%
Zogby Analytics	May 2–9	463	–	37%	3%	7%	5%	5%	15%	6%	11% (Note: Gillibrand, Klobuchar, and Yang with 2%; Castro, Delaney, Gabbard, Hickenlooper, and Inslee with 1%; others with <1%)	10%
GBAO	May 1–5	800	± 3.5%	36%	3%	5%	6%	4%	13%	8%	3% (Note: Castro and Klobuchar with 1%; Gillibrand, Hickenlooper, and Inslee with 0%; others with 1%)	22%
Morning Consult	Apr 29 – May 5	15,770 (LV)	± 1.0%	40%	3%	6%	7%	5%	19%	8%	12% (Note: Klobuchar with 2%; Bullock, Castro, Delaney, Gabbard, Gillibrand, Hickenlooper, Ryan, and Yang with 1%; Inslee and Moulton with 0%; others with 2%)	–
The Hill/HarrisX	May 3–4	440 (RV)	± 5.0%	46%	3%	8%	6%	3%	14%	7%	14% (Note: Bennet, Castro, Delaney, Gabbard, Gillibrand, Inslee, Ryan, Swalwell, Williamson, and Yang with 1%; Gravel, Hickenlooper, Klobuchar, Messam, and Moulton with 0%; others with 4%)	–
Harvard-Harris	Apr 30 – May 1	259 (RV)	–	44%	3%	2%	9%	3%	14%	5%	6% (Note: Bloomberg and Klobuchar with 2%; Delaney and Ryan with 1%; Castro, Gabbard, Gillibrand, Gravel, Hickenlooper, Inslee, Messam, Moulton, Swalwell, Williamson, and Yang with 0%; others with 0%)	11%
Quinnipiac University	Apr 26–29	419	± 5.6%	38%	2%	10%	8%	5%	11%	12%	4% (Note: Castro, Inslee, Klobuchar, and Yang with 1%; Delaney, Gabbard, Gillibrand, Hickenlooper, Messam, Moulton, Ryan, Swalwell, and Williamson with <1%; others with <1%)	8%
HarrisX	Apr 26–28	741 (RV)	± 3.7%	33%	3%	5%	5%	5%	16%	6%	10% (Note: Hickenlooper with 2%; Castro, Delaney, Gabbard, Gillibrand, Gravel, Klobuchar, Moulton, and Swalwell with 1%; Inslee, Messam, Ryan, Williamson, and Yang with 0%; others with 0%)	13%
CNN/SSRS	Apr 25–28	411	± 5.9%	39%	2%	7%	5%	6%	15%	8%	10% (Note: Gabbard and Klobuchar with 2%; Castro, Gillibrand, Inslee, Swalwell, Williamson, and Yang with 1%; de Blasio and Ryan with <1%; Bennet, Bullock, Delaney, Hickenlooper, Messam, and Moulton with 0%; others with <1%)	7%
Morning Consult	Apr 22–28	15,475 (LV)	± 1.0%	36%	3%	8%	7%	5%	22%	9%	14% (Note: Klobuchar and Yang with 2%; Bullock, Castro, Delaney, Gabbard, Gillibrand, Hickenlooper, Inslee, and Ryan with 1%; Moulton with 0%; others with 2%)	–
	Apr 25	Biden announces his candidacy										
Ipsos/Reuters	Apr 17–23	2,237	–	24%	3%	7%	6%	6%	15%	5%	13% (Note: Bullock, Castro, Gillibrand, Hickenlooper, Klobuchar, Ryan, and Yang with 1%; Delaney, Gabbard, Inslee, Messam, Swalwell, and Williamson with 0%; others with 6%)	21%
Morning Consult	Apr 15–21	14,335 (LV)	± 1.0%	30%	4%	9%	8%	6%	24%	7%	12% (Note: Klobuchar and Yang with 2%; Castro, Gabbard, Gillibrand, Hickenlooper, Inslee, and Ryan with 1%; Bullock and Delaney with 0%; others with 2%)	–
Echelon Insights	Apr 17–19	499	–	26%	3%	7%	6%	9%	22%	3%	6% (Note: Yang with 2%; Castro, Delaney, and Klobuchar with 1%; Bennet, de Blasio, Gabbard, Gillibrand, Hickenlooper, Inslee, Messam, Moulton, Ryan, Swalwell, and Williamson with <1%; others with 1%)	18%
Change Research	Apr 12–15	2,518	± 2.2%	21%	4%	17%	7%	9%	20%	8%	15% (Note: Abrams with 4%; Gabbard, Klobuchar, and Yang with 2%; Castro, Hickenlooper, Inslee, Ryan, and Swalwell with 1%; Bennet, Delaney, Gillibrand, McAuliffe, Messam, and Williamson with 0%)	–
Change Research	Apr 12–15	2,518	± 2.2%	–	5%	21%	10%	14%	26%	10%	14% (Note: Klobuchar and Yang with 3%; Castro, Gabbard, Gillibrand, Hickenlooper, Inslee, Ryan, Swalwell, and Williamson with 1%; Delaney and Messam with 0%)	–
Monmouth University	Apr 11–15	330	± 5.4%	27%	2%	8%	8%	4%	20%	6%	5% (Note: Hickenlooper with 2%; de Blasio and Klobuchar with 1%; Castro, Gillibrand, Inslee, McAuliffe, Messam, Moulton, Swalwell, Williamson, and Yang with <1%; Bennet, Bullock, Delaney, Gabbard, and Ryan with 0%; others with 1%)	14%
Monmouth University	Apr 11–15	330	± 5.4%	–	3%	11%	11%	6%	27%	8%	7% (Note: Hickenlooper and Klobuchar with 2%; de Blasio and Yang with 1%; Castro, Gillibrand, Inslee, McAuliffe, Messam, Moulton, Ryan, Swalwell, and Williamson with <1%; Bennet, Bullock, Delaney, and Gabbard with 0%; others with 1%)	20%
USC Dornsife/LAT	Mar 15 – Apr 15	2,196	± 2.0%	27%	2%	2%	7%	7%	16%	4%	9% (Note: Hickenlooper with 2%; Castro, Gabbard, Gillibrand, Inslee, Klobuchar, and Yang with 1%; Delaney and Williamson with 0%; others with 1%)	27%
	Apr 14	Buttigieg announces his candidacy										
Emerson College	Apr 11–14	356	± 5.2%	24%	2%	9%	8%	8%	29%	7%	14% (Note: Castro and Yang with 3%; Delaney, Gabbard, Gravel, Klobuchar, Ryan, and Swalwell with 1%; Gillibrand, Hickenlooper, Inslee, Messam, and Williamson with 0%; others with 2%)	–
Morning Consult	Apr 8–14	12,550 (LV)	± 1.0%	31%	4%	7%	9%	8%	23%	7%	14% (Note: Klobuchar with 2%; Bullock, Castro, Delaney, Gabbard, Gillibrand, Hickenlooper, Inslee, Ryan, and Yang with 1%; McAuliffe with 0%; others with 3%)	–
Morning Consult	Apr 8–14	12,550 (LV)	± 1.0%	–	6%	9%	12%	11%	35%	10%	19% (Note: Klobuchar with 3%; Gillibrand, Ryan, and Yang with 2%; Bullock, Castro, Delaney, Gabbard, Hickenlooper, Inslee, and McAuliffe with 1%; others with 3%)	–
Morning Consult	Apr 1–7	13,644 (LV)	± 1.0%	32%	4%	5%	9%	8%	23%	7%	14% (Note: Gillibrand and Klobuchar with 2%; Bullock, Castro, Delaney, Gabbard, Hickenlooper, Inslee, Ryan, and Yang with 1%; McAuliffe with 0%; others with 2%)	–
The Hill/HarrisX	Apr 5–6	370 (RV)	± 5.0%	36%	6%	4%	9%	7%	19%	6%	14% (Note: Gillibrand and Klobuchar with 2%; Castro and Yang with 1%; Delaney and Gabbard with 0%; others with 8%)	–

=== March 2019 ===
March 2019 polling
Poll source	Date(s) administered	Sample size	Margin of error	Joe Biden	Cory Booker	Pete Buttigieg	Kamala Harris	Amy Klobuchar	Beto O'Rourke	Bernie Sanders	Elizabeth Warren	Other	Undecided
HarrisX	Mar 29–31	743 (RV)	± 3.7%	29%	4%	3%	6%	2%	6%	18%	5%	6% (Note: Castro, Delaney, Gillibrand, Williamson and Yang with 1%; Gabbard, Hickenlooper and Inslee with 0%; others with 1%)	16%
Morning Consult	Mar 25–31	12,940 (LV)	± 1.0%	33%	4%	2%	8%	3%	8%	25%	7%	10% (Note: Bullock, Castro, Delaney, Gabbard, Gillibrand, Hickenlooper and Inslee with 1%; McAuliffe with 0%; others with 3%)	–
Harvard-Harris	Mar 25–26	263	–	35%	4%	2%	5%	2%	7%	17%	6%	9% (Note: Gabbard with 2%; Avenatti, Bloomberg, Castro, Gillibrand, Hickenlooper, Inslee and Yang with 1%; others with 0%)	13%
Quinnipiac University	Mar 21–25	559	± 5.1%	29%	2%	4%	8%	2%	12%	19%	4%	2% (Note: Castro and Hickenlooper with 1%; Delaney, Gabbard, Gillibrand, Inslee, Williamson and Yang with <1%; others with 1%)	14%
Morning Consult	Mar 18–24	13,725 (LV)	± 1.0%	35%	4%	2%	8%	2%	8%	25%	7%	10%	–
Fox News	Mar 17–20	403	± 5.0%	31%	4%	1%	8%	1%	8%	23%	4%	8% (Note: Gillibrand with 2%; Castro, de Blasio, Delaney, Inslee and Yang with 1%; Bennet, Bullock, Gabbard, McAuliffe and Swalwell with <1%; Hickenlooper with 0%; others with 1%)	11%
Emerson College	Mar 17–18	487	± 4.4%	26%	3%	3%	12%	1%	11%	26%	8%	10% (Note: Castro, Gabbard, Hickenlooper, Inslee and Yang with 1%; Gillibrand with 0%; others with 5%)	–
CNN/SSRS	Mar 14–17	456	± 5.7%	28%	3%	1%	12%	3%	11%	20%	6%	10% (Note: Kerry with 4%; Castro, Gillibrand, Hickenlooper and Inslee with 1%; Delaney, Gabbard, and McAuliffe with <1%; Bullock with 0%; others with 2%)	5%
Morning Consult	Mar 11–17	13,551 (LV)	± 1.0%	35%	4%	1%	8%	2%	8%	27%	7%	9% (Note: Castro, Delaney, Gabbard, Gillibrand, Hickenlooper and Inslee with 1%; Bullock and McAuliffe with 0%; others with 3%)	–
	Mar 14	O'Rourke announces his candidacy											
Change Research	Mar 8–10	1,919	–	36%	3%	2%	9%	2%	7%	24%	9%	8% (Note: Inslee with 2%; Bennet, Castro, Gabbard, Gillibrand, Hickenlooper and Yang with 1%; Bullock, Cuomo, de Blasio, Delaney, McAuliffe, Moulton, Swalwell and Williamson with 0%)	–
Change Research	Mar 8–10	1,919	–	–	5%	1%	17%	3%	14%	36%	13%	9% (Note: Castro, Inslee and Yang with 2%; Gabbard, Gillibrand and Hickenlooper with 1%; Delaney and Williamson with 0%)	–
HarrisX	Mar 8–10	740 (RV)	± 3.7%	27%	4%	0%	8%	2%	6%	19%	4%	8% (Note: Delaney with 2%; Castro, Gillibrand, Hickenlooper, Inslee and Yang with 1%; Gabbard and Williamson with 0%; others with 1%)	16%
Morning Consult	Mar 4–10	15,226 (LV)	± 1.0%	31%	4%	1%	10%	3%	7%	27%	7%	11% (Note: Bullock, Castro, Delaney, Gabbard, Gillibrand, Hickenlooper, Inslee and McAuliffe with 1%; others with 3%)	–
	Mar 5	Bloomberg announces that he will not run											
	Mar 4	Clinton announces that she will not run											
Monmouth University	Mar 1–4	310	± 5.6%	28%	5%	<1%	10%	3%	6%	25%	8%	7% (Note: Bloomberg and Brown, Castro, de Blasio, Hickenlooper and Yang with 1%; Bennet, Gabbard, Gillibrand, Holder, Inslee, McAuliffe and Williamson with <1%; Bullock and Delaney with 0%; others with <1%)	8%
Monmouth University	Mar 1–4	310	± 5.6%	–	6%	<1%	15%	3%	7%	32%	10%	9% (Note: Bloomberg and Brown with 2%; Castro, de Blasio, Gillibrand, Hickenlooper and Yang with 1%; Bennet, Gabbard, Holder, Inslee, McAuliffe and Williamson with <1%; Bullock and Delaney with 0%; others with <1%)	15%
GBAO	Feb 25 – Mar 3	817	–	28%	3%	0%	9%	2%	7%	20%	5%	4% (Note: Brown, Castro and Gabbard with 1%; Delaney and Gillibrand with 0%; others with 1%)	22%
Morning Consult	Feb 25 – Mar 3	12,560 (LV)	± 1.0%	31%	4%	1%	11%	3%	6%	27%	7%	12% (Note: Bloomberg with 2%; Brown, Bullock, Castro, Gabbard, Gillibrand, Hickenlooper and Holder with 1%; Delaney, Inslee and McAuliffe with 0%; others with 3%)	–

=== January–February 2019 ===
January–February 2019 polling
Poll source	Date(s) administered	Sample size	Margin of error	Joe Biden	Michael Bloomberg	Cory Booker	Kamala Harris	Amy Klobuchar	Beto O'Rourke	Bernie Sanders	Elizabeth Warren	Other	Undecided
Morning Consult	Feb 18–24	15,642 (LV)	± 1.0%	29%	2%	4%	10%	3%	7%	27%	7%	13% (Note: Brown, Bullock, Buttigieg, Castro, Delaney, Gabbard, Gillibrand, Hickenlooper, Holder and McAuliffe with 1%; Inslee with 0%; others with 3%)	–
Harvard-Harris	Feb 19–20	337	–	37%	3%	2%	10%	–	6%	22%	4%	5% (Note: Castro with 2%; Gabbard and Gillibrand with 1%; Avenatti with 0%; others with 1%)	10%
	Feb 19	Sanders announces his candidacy											
Morning Consult	Feb 11–17	15,383 (LV)	± 1.0%	30%	2%	5%	11%	4%	7%	21%	8%	11% (Note: Brown, Bullock, Castro, Gabbard, Gillibrand, Hickenlooper, Holder, and McAuliffe with 1%; Buttigieg, Delaney, and Inslee with 0%; others with 3%)	–
Emerson College	Feb 14–16	431	± 4.7%	27%	2%	9%	15%	5%	4%	17%	9%	12% (Note: Brown with 3%; Gabbard with 2%; Castro and Gillibrand with 1%; Buttigieg and Delaney with 0%; others with 6%)	–
Bold Blue Campaigns	Feb 9–11	500	± 4.5%	12%	<1%	<1%	11%	1%	7%	9%	3%	9% (Note: Abrams with 5%; Gillibrand with 3%; Brown with 1%; Castro with <1%)	48%
	Feb 10	Klobuchar announces her candidacy											
Morning Consult	Feb 4–10	11,627 (LV)	± 1.0%	29%	2%	5%	13%	3%	7%	22%	8%	11% (Note: Brown with 2%; Bullock, Castro, Gillibrand, Gabbard, Hickenlooper, and Holder with 1%; Buttigieg, Delaney, Inslee, and McAuliffe with 0%; others with 3%)	–
	Feb 9	Warren announces her candidacy											
Morning Consult	Jan 28 – Feb 3	14,494 (LV)	± 1.0%	30%	2%	4%	14%	2%	6%	21%	9%	9% (Note: Castro with 2%; Brown, Bullock, Gabbard, Gillibrand, Hickenlooper, Holder, and McAuliffe with 1%; Buttigieg, Delaney, and Inslee with 0%)	–
Morning Consult/Politico	Feb 1–2	737 (RV)	± 4.0%	29%	2%	5%	14%	2%	5%	16%	6%	7% (Note: Brown with 2%; Gabbard, Hickenlooper, and Kerry with 1%; Bullock, Buttigieg, Castro, Delaney, Garcetti, Gillibrand, Holder, Inslee, McAuliffe, and Newsom with 0%; others with 2%)	13%
	Feb 1	Booker announces his candidacy											
Monmouth University	Jan 25–27	313	± 5.5%	29%	4%	4%	11%	2%	7%	16%	8%	8% (Note: Brown, Castro, Gabbard, Gillibrand, Hickenlooper, Holder, and Yang with 1%; Delaney, Inslee, and McAuliffe with <1%; Buttigieg with 0%; others with 1%)	9%
Morning Consult/Politico	Jan 25–27	685 (RV)	± 4.0%	33%	2%	3%	10%	1%	6%	15%	6%	10% (Note: Brown, Bullock, Castro, Gillibrand, Hickenlooper, Holder, and Kerry with 1%; Buttigieg, Delaney, Gabbard, Garcetti, Inslee, McAuliffe, and Schultz with 0%; others with 3%)	15%
Morning Consult	Jan 21–27	14,381 (LV)	± 1.0%	31%	3%	3%	11%	2%	7%	21%	9%	9% (Note: Castro and Gillibrand with 2%; Brown, Bullock, Hickenlooper, Holder, and McAuliffe with 1%; Delaney, Gabbard, and Inslee with 0%)	–
Morning Consult/Politico	Jan 18–22	694 (RV)	± 4.0%	26%	2%	4%	9%	2%	6%	16%	6%	11% (Note: Castro and Gillibrand with 2%; Brown, Bullock, Gabbard, Hickenlooper, and Kerry with 1%; Delaney, Garcetti, Holder, Inslee, McAuliffe, and Schultz with 0%; others with 2%)	18%
	Jan 21	Harris announces her candidacy											
Emerson College	Jan 20–21	355	± 5.2%	45%	7%	8%	3%	1%	3%	5%	3%	25% (Note: Castro with 8%; Brown with 4%; Delaney and Gabbard with 2%; Gillibrand and Ojeda with 1%; others with 6%)	–
Emerson College	Jan 20–21	355	± 5.2%	–	–	–	19%	–	–	–	43%	38% (Note: Castro with 12%; Gillibrand with 9%; Delaney with 8%; Ojeda with 7%; Gabbard with 3%)	–
Zogby Analytics	Jan 18–20	410	± 4.8%	27%	8%	1%	6%	–	6%	18%	9%	5% (Note: Brown and Gillibrand with 2%; Delaney with 1%; Castro, Gabbard, and McAuliffe with 0%)	21%
Morning Consult	Jan 14–20	14,250 (LV)	± 1.0%	30%	4%	3%	6%	2%	8%	23%	11%	9% (Note: Castro and Gillibrand with 2%; Brown, Bullock, Hickenlooper, Holder, and McAuliffe with 1%; Delaney and Inslee with 0%)	–
Harvard-Harris	Jan 15–16	479	–	23%	5%	3%	7%	–	8%	21%	4%	8% (Note: Gabbard and Gillibrand with 2%; Castro with 1%; Avenatti with 0%; others with 3%)	15%
Morning Consult/Politico	Jan 11–14	674 (RV)	± 4.0%	32%	1%	2%	6%	1%	8%	15%	9%	9% (Note: Brown, Delaney, Gillibrand, Hickenlooper, Holder, and Kerry with 1%; Bullock, Castro, Garcetti, Inslee, McAuliffe, and Schultz with 0%; others with 3%)	18%
Morning Consult	Jan 7–13	4,749 (LV)	± 2.0%	31%	4%	3%	7%	2%	8%	23%	11%	8% (Note: Castro with 2%; Brown, Bullock, Gillibrand, Hickenlooper, Holder, and McAuliffe with 1%; Delaney and Inslee with 0%)	–

== Before 2019 ==
=== October–December 2018 ===
October–December 2018 polling
Poll source	Date(s) administered	Sample size	Margin of error	Joe Biden	Michael Bloomberg	Cory Booker	Kamala Harris	Beto O'Rourke	Bernie Sanders	Elizabeth Warren	Other	Undecided
CNN/SSRS	Dec 6–9	463	± 5.6%	30%	3%	5%	4%	9%	14%	3%	15% (Note: Kerry with 4%; Klobuchar with 3%; Brown, Bullock, Gillibrand, Holder, Inslee, and McAuliffe with 1%; Castro, Garcetti, and Hickenlooper with <1%; Delaney and Steyer with 0%; others with 2%)	9%
Emerson College	Dec 6–9	320	–	26%	–	–	9%	15%	22%	7%	22% (Note: Brown with 7%; others with 15%)	–
Harvard-Harris	Nov 27–28	449	–	28%	4%	4%	3%	7%	21%	5%	4% (Note: Avenatti with 2%; others with 2%)	18%
Morning Consult/Politico	Nov 7–9	733 (RV)	± 4.0%	26%	2%	3%	4%	8%	19%	5%	12% (Note: Brown, Bullock, Castro, Cuomo, Garcetti, Gillibrand, Klobuchar, Newsom, and Schultz with 1%; Avenatti, Delaney, Holder, and Patrick with 0%; others with 3%)	21%
CNN/SSRS	Oct 4–7	464	± 5.5%	33%	4%	5%	9%	4%	13%	8%	16% (Note: Kerry with 5%; Holder with 3%; Garcetti with 2%; Avenatti, Gillibrand, Klobuchar, and Patrick with 1%; Bullock and Delaney with <1%; others with 2%)	6%

=== Before October 2018 ===
Polling prior to December 2018
Poll source	Date(s) administered	Sample size	Margin of error	Joe Biden	Cory Booker	Andrew Cuomo	Kirsten Gillibrand	Kamala Harris	Bernie Sanders	Elizabeth Warren	Oprah Winfrey	Other	Undecided
	2018												
Zogby Analytics	Aug 6–8	576	± 4.1%	27%	4%	3%	2%	5%	16%	7%	–	7% (Note: Brown and Holder with 2%; Delaney, McAuliffe, and Patrick with 1%)	31%
GQR Research	Jul 19–26	443	–	30%	8%	–	–	5%	28%	13%	–	8% (Note: "A governor, like Terry McAuliffe of Virginia, Steve Bullock of Montana or John Hickenlooper of Colorado" and Schultz with 2%; Steyer and Landrieu with 1%; others with 2%)	9%
Zogby Analytics	Jun 4–6	495	± 4.4%	21%	4%	4%	1%	5%	19%	6%	10%	2% (Note: Holder and McAuliffe with 1%; Brown and Patrick with 0%)	29%
Saint Leo University	May 25–31	–	–	19%	2%	4%	2%	4%	9%	4%	15%	15% (Note: Holder with 6%; Bullock and Landrieu with 3%; Brown and Murphy with 1%; McAuliffe and Patrick with 0%; others with 1%)	21%
Zogby Analytics	May 10–12	533	± 4.2%	26%	3%	2%	1%	4%	18%	8%	14%	5% (Note: Brown, Holder, and Patrick with 1%; McAuliffe with 0%)	22%
Civis Analytics	Jan 2018	–	–	29%	–	–	–	–	27%	–	17%	–	–
RABA Research	Jan 10–11	345	± 5.0%	26%	–	–	–	–	21%	18%	20%	–	15%
SurveyMonkey/Axios	Jan 10–11	–	–	22%	3%	–	4%	7%	17%	16%	16%	9% (Note: Steyer with 1%; others with 8%)	–
Emerson College	Jan 8–11	216	–	27%	3%	–	3%	2%	23%	9%	–	15% (Note: Kander with 4%; Klobuchar with 2%; others with 9%)	19%
GQR Research	Jan 6–11	442	–	26%	6%	–	–	–	29%	14%	8%	12% (Note: "A woman senator like Kamala Harris or Kirsten Gillibrand" with 5%; "Moderate Governors John Hickenlooper or Terry McAuliffe" and "A cultural figure like Tom Hanks or Dwayne 'the Rock' Johnson" with 2%; "A businessman like Tom Steyer or Howard Schultz", "A young lawmaker like Chris Murphy or Julian Castro", and "A mayor of a major city like Bill DeBlasio or Antonio Villaraigosa" with 1%; others with 0%)	6%
	2017												
Zogby Analytics	Sep 7–9	356	± 5.2%	17%	–	3%	3%	6%	28%	12%	–	9% (Note: Zuckerberg with 7%; Klobuchar and McAuliffe with 1%)	23%
Gravis Marketing	Jul 21–31	1,917	–	21%	4%	1%	2%	6%	–	–	–	8% (Note: Cuban with 7%; Klobuchar with 1%)	43%
	2016												
Public Policy Polling	Dec 6–7	400	± 4.9%	31%	4%	2%	3%	–	24%	16%	–	7% (Note: Franken with 3%; Brown with 2%; Castro with 0%)	14%

== Polls including Hillary Clinton and Michelle Obama ==
Polls including Clinton and Obama
Poll source	Date(s) administered	Sample size	Margin of error	Joe Biden	Michael Bloomberg	Cory Booker	Hillary Clinton	Kamala Harris	Michelle Obama	Beto O'Rourke	Bernie Sanders	Elizabeth Warren	Oprah Winfrey	Other	Undecided
McLaughlin & Associates	Dec 14–18, 2019	480 (LV)	–	23%	5%	4%	6%	–	–	–	17%	15%	–	22% (Note: Buttigieg with 5%; Yang with 4%; Bennet and Steyer with 3%; Castro and Klobuchar with 2%; Delaney and Gabbard with 1%; Patrick and Williamson with 0%)	10%
Zogby Analytics	Dec 5–8, 2019	443 (LV)	± 4.7%	28%	9%	– (Note: Not listed separately from "someone else")	6%	–	–	–	20%	12%	–	21% (Note: Buttigieg with 8%; Steyer and Yang with 3%; Gabbard and Klobuchar with 2%; someone else with 3%)	5%
Harvard-Harris	Nov 27–29, 2019	756 (RV)	–	20%	5%	1%	22%	2%	–	1%	12%	9%	–	22% (Note: Buttigieg and Kerry with 5%; Klobuchar, Steyer and Yang with 2%; Castro, Delaney, Gabbard, and Gravel with 1%; Gillibrand, Messam, Swalwell and Williamson with 0%; other with 1%; will not vote with 0%)	7%
Harvard-Harris	Oct 29–31, 2019	640 (RV)	–	19%	6%	3%	18%	3%	–	2%	12%	13%	–	17% (Note: Kerry with 8%; Buttigieg and Yang with 2%; Klobuchar and Steyer with 1%; Castro, Gabbard, Gravel, Messam, Swalwell and Williamson with 0%; Delaney with no voters; not planning on voting with 2%; other with 0%)	7%
Fox News	Oct 27–30, 2019	471 (LV)	± 4.5%	–	–	–	27%	–	–	–	–	–	–	30% (Note: Other with 30%)	43%
Fox News	Oct 27–30, 2019	471 (LV)	± 4.5%	–	–	–	–	–	50%	–	–	–	–	8% (Note: Other with 8%)	42%
McLaughlin & Associates	Oct 17–22, 2019	468 (LV)	–	– (Note: If Biden were not in the race)	1%	4%	10%	9%	–	3%	23%	20%	–	21% (Note: Yang with 6%; Buttigieg with 5%; Bennet, Gabbard, Klobuchar and Steyer with 2%; Delaney and Ryan with 1%; Bullock, Castro and Messam with 0%; Williamson with no voters)	10%
Harvard-Harris	Apr 30 – May 1, 2019	254 (RV)	–	34%	2%	5%	6%	4%	–	8%	17%	3%	–	12% (Note: Buttigieg with 4%; Yang with 2%; Delaney, Hickenlooper, Klobuchar, and Ryan with 1%; Castro, Gabbard, Gillibrand, Gravel, Inslee, Messam, Moulton, Swalwell, and Williamson with 0%; others with 1%)	9%
ABC News/Washington Post*	Apr 22–25, 2019	427 (A)	± 5.5%	17%	<1%	1%	2%	4%	2%	4%	11%	4%	–	14% (Note: Buttigieg with 5%; Klobuchar and Trump with 1%; Bennet, Castro, Hickenlooper, Barack Obama, Schultz, and Yang with <1%; others with 4%)	35%
Harvard-Harris	Mar 25–26, 2019	273	–	26%	0%	3%	11%	11%	–	5%	18%	5%	–	6% (Note: Buttigieg and Yang with 2%; Castro and Klobuchar with 1%; Avenatti, Gabbard, Gillibrand, Hickenlooper, and Inslee with 0%; others with 0%)	12%
McLaughlin & Associates	Mar 20–24, 2019	447	–	28%	–	3%	8%	8%	–	8%	17%	5%	–	8% (Note: Buttigieg with 3%; Delaney, Gillibrand, Hickenlooper, Klobuchar, and Williamson with 1%; Castro, Cuomo, de Blasio, Gabbard, Inslee, McAuliffe and Yang with 0%)	16%
D-CYFOR	Feb 22–23, 2019	453	–	39%	2%	4%	8%	8%	–	3%	14%	5%	–	5% (Note: Klobuchar with 2%; Delaney and Gabbard with 1%; Buttigieg, Castro, and Gillibrand with 0%; others with 1%)	11%
Harvard-Harris	Feb 19–20, 2019	346	–	30%	2%	5%	10%	10%	–	4%	19%	4%	–	1% (Note: Avenatti, Castro, Gabbard, and Gillibrand with 0%; others with 1%)	13%
The Hill/HarrisX	Feb 17–18, 2019	370 (RV)	± 5.0%	25%	5%	4%	–	12%	25%	6%	11%	5%	–	7% (Note: Klobuchar with 2%; Brown with 1%; others with 4%)	–
McLaughlin & Associates	Feb 6–10, 2019	450	–	25%	2%	3%	7%	8%	–	6%	16%	5%	5%	10% (Note: Brown, Castro, Cuomo, Gillibrand, Hickenlooper, Klobuchar, Patrick, and Zuckerberg with 1%; Buttigieg, de Blasio, Delaney, Gabbard, Holder, Inslee, Kaine, McAuliffe, and Yang with 0%)	15%
ABC News/Washington Post*	Jan 21–24, 2019	447	± 5.5%	9%	<1%	1%	1%	8%	2%	3%	4%	2%	1%	11% (Note: Trump with 4%; Bullock, Klobuchar, and Pelosi with 1%; Brown, Castro, Gillibrand, Hickenlooper, Johnson, Kennedy, Kucinich, Lee, Scott, Sinema, and Warner with <1%; others with 4%)	43%
Zogby Analytics	Jan 18–20, 2019	410	± 4.8%	25%	5%	3%	–	5%	17%	4%	12%	5%	–	5% (Note: Brown with 2%; Castro, Delaney, and Gillibrand with 1%; Gabbard and McAuliffe with 0%)	20%
Harvard-Harris	Jan 15–16, 2019	488	–	24%	5%	2%	10%	4%	–	9%	13%	5%	–	6% (Note: Castro with 2%; Gabbard and Gillibrand with 1%; Avenatti with 0%; others with 2%)	17%
Morning Consult/Politico	Jan 4–6, 2019	699 (RV)	± 4.0%	27%	1%	3%	12%	3%	–	7%	16%	4%	–	9% (Note: Kerry and Klobuchar with 2%; Brown, Gillibrand, and Inslee with 1%; Bullock, Castro, Cuomo, Delaney, Garcetti, Hickenlooper, Holder, McAuliffe, and Schultz with 0%; others with 2%)	15%
Change Research	Dec 13–17, 2018	2,968	–	21%	2%	4%	5%	8%	–	21%	16%	7%	–	18% (Note: Kennedy with 5%; Klobuchar with 3%; Brown and Castro with 2%; Cuomo, Gillibrand, Holder, Kerry, Steyer, and Swalwell with 1%; Delaney, McAuliffe, and Schultz with 0%)	–
Morning Consult/Politico	Dec 14–16, 2018	706 (RV)	± 4.0%	25%	2%	3%	13%	3%	–	8%	15%	3%	–	13% (Note: Kerry with 2%; Brown, Castro, Cuomo, Garcetti, Gillibrand, Hickenlooper, Holder, Klobuchar, and Newsom with 1%; Bullock, Delaney, McAuliffe, and Schultz with 0%; others with 3%)	15%
McLaughlin & Associates	Dec 10–14, 2018	468	–	17%	2%	–	9%	3%	16%	11%	18%	4%	3%	7% (Note: Brown with 2%; Gillibrand, Hickenlooper, Holder, Klobuchar, and Patrick with 1%; de Blasio, Kaine, Schultz, and Zuckerberg with 0%)	11%
Harvard-Harris	Nov 27–28, 2018	459	–	25%	2%	3%	13%	2%	–	9%	15%	4%	–	5% (Note: Avenatti with 1%; others with 4%)	15%
The Hill/HarrisX	Nov 5–6, 2018	370 (RV)	± 5.0%	30%	5%	5%	16%	5%	–	–	20%	5%	–	–	14%
Change Research	Oct 24–26, 2018	–	–	23%	–	5%	6%	10%	–	10%	18%	9%	–	8% (Note: Kennedy with 8%)	–
Harvard-Harris	Jun 24–25, 2018	533	–	32%	3%	6%	18%	2%	–	–	16%	10%	–	14% (Note: Cuomo with 1%; Gillibrand with 1%; others with 12%)	–
Harvard-Harris	Jan 13–16, 2018	711	–	27%	–	4%	13%	4%	–	–	16%	10%	13%	13% (Note: Cuomo with 2%; Gillibrand with 1% others with 10%)	–
USC Dornsife/LAT	Dec 15, 2017 – Jan 15, 2018	1,576	± 3.0%	28%	–	3%	19%	5%	–	–	22%	11%	–	7% (Note: Gillibrand with 2%; Klobuchar with 1%; others with 4%)	–
Zogby Analytics	Oct 19–25, 2017	682	± 3.8%	19%	–	–	–	3%	22%	–	18%	8%	–	10% (Note: Zuckerberg with 4%; Cuomo and McAuliffe with 2%; Gillibrand and Klobuchar with 1%)	20%

== Head-to-head polls ==
Head-to-head polling data taken while more than two major candidates were in the race
Poll source	Date(s) administered	Sample size	Margin of error	Joe Biden	Michael Bloomberg	Pete Buttigieg	Kirsten Gillibrand	Kamala Harris	Amy Klobuchar	Bernie Sanders	Elizabeth Warren	Oprah Winfrey	Undecided
Ipsos/Reuters	Mar 13-16, 2020	458 (RV)	± 5.2%	54%	–	–	–	–	–	46%	–	–	–
Ipsos/Reutuers	Mar 6-9, 2020	420 (RV)	± 5.5%	59%	–	–	–	–	–	41%	–	–	–
Ipsos/Reuters	Mar 4-5, 2020	474 (RV)	± 5.1%	55%	–	–	–	–	–	45%	–	–	–
Ipsos/Reuters	Feb 28-Mar 2, 2020	469 (RV)	± 5.2%	48%	–	–	–	–	–	52%	–	–	–
Ipsos/Reuters	Feb 28-Mar 2, 2020	469 (RV)	± 5.2%	–	41%	–	–	–	–	59%	–	–	–
Change Research/Election Science	Feb 25–27, 2020	821 (LV)	–	78.6%	21.4%	–	–	–	–	–	–	–	–
Change Research/Election Science	Feb 25–27, 2020	821 (LV)	–	45.4%	–	54.6%	–	–	–	–	–	–	–
Change Research/Election Science	Feb 25–27, 2020	821 (LV)	–	51.1%	–	–	–	–	48.9%	–	–	–	–
Change Research/Election Science	Feb 25–27, 2020	821 (LV)	–	35.7%	–	–	–	–	–	64.3%	–	–	–
Change Research/Election Science	Feb 25–27, 2020	821 (LV)	–	32.4%	–	–	–	–	–	–	67.6%	–	–
Change Research/Election Science	Feb 25–27, 2020	821 (LV)	–	–	77.1%	22.9%	–	–	–	–	–	–	–
Change Research/Election Science	Feb 25–27, 2020	821 (LV)	–	–	27.4%	–	–	–	72.6%	–	–	–	–
Change Research/Election Science	Feb 25–27, 2020	821 (LV)	–	–	24.9%	–	–	–	–	75.1%	–	–	–
Change Research/Election Science	Feb 25–27, 2020	821 (LV)	–	–	22.7%	–	–	–	–	–	77.3%	–	–
Change Research/Election Science	Feb 25–27, 2020	821 (LV)	–	–	–	57.5%	–	–	42.5%	–	–	–	–
Change Research/Election Science	Feb 25–27, 2020	821 (LV)	–	–	–	37.2%	–	–	–	62.8%	–	–	–
Change Research/Election Science	Feb 25–27, 2020	821 (LV)	–	–	–	31.9%	–	–	–	–	68.1%	–	–
Change Research/Election Science	Feb 25–27, 2020	821 (LV)	–	–	–	–	–	–	31.9%	68.1%	–	–	–
Change Research/Election Science	Feb 25–27, 2020	821 (LV)	–	–	–	–	–	–	22.6%	–	77.4%	–	–
Change Research/Election Science	Feb 25–27, 2020	821 (LV)	–	–	–	–	–	–	–	54.2%	45.8%	–	–
NBC News/Wall Street Journal	Feb 14-17, 2020	426 (LV)	± 4.8% (Note: Percentages calculated as original percentage/97%, given that 3% of voters said they'd back neither candidate)	–	38%	–	–	–	–	59%	–	–	3%
NBC News/Wall Street Journal	Feb 14-17, 2020	426 (LV)	± 4.8% (Note: Percentages calculated as original percentage/95%, given that 5% of voters said they'd back neither candidate)	–	–	40%	–	–	–	57%	–	–	5%
Zogby Analytics	Feb 13–14, 2020	732 (LV)	± 3.6%	–	50%	–	–	–	–	50%	–	–	–
YouGov/Yahoo News	Feb 12–13, 2020	367 (LV)	–	47%	34%	–	–	–	–	–	–	–	19%
YouGov/Yahoo News	Feb 12–13, 2020	347 (LV)	–	45%	–	42%	–	–	–	–	–	–	13%
YouGov/Yahoo News	Feb 12–13, 2020	362 (LV)	–	43%	–	–	–	–	45%	–	–	–	12%
YouGov/Yahoo News	Feb 12–13, 2020	359 (LV)	–	44%	–	–	–	–	–	48%	–	–	8%
YouGov/Yahoo News	Feb 12–13, 2020	366 (LV)	–	41%	–	–	–	–	–	–	49%	–	9%
YouGov/Yahoo News	Feb 12–13, 2020	331 (LV)	–	–	37%	44%	–	–	–	–	–	–	19%
YouGov/Yahoo News	Feb 12–13, 2020	351 (LV)	–	–	38%	–	–	–	43%	–	–	–	20%
YouGov/Yahoo News	Feb 12–13, 2020	369 (LV)	–	–	38%	–	–	–	–	53%	–	–	10%
YouGov/Yahoo News	Feb 12–13, 2020	375 (LV)	–	–	38%	–	–	–	–	–	52%	–	10%
YouGov/Yahoo News	Feb 12–13, 2020	388 (LV)	–	–	–	33%	–	–	44%	–	–	–	23%
YouGov/Yahoo News	Feb 12–13, 2020	347 (LV)	–	–	–	37%	–	–	–	54%	–	–	10%
YouGov/Yahoo News	Feb 12–13, 2020	347 (LV)	–	–	–	34%	–	–	–	–	52%	–	14%
YouGov/Yahoo News	Feb 12–13, 2020	383 (LV)	–	–	–	–	–	–	33%	54%	–	–	13%
YouGov/Yahoo News	Feb 12–13, 2020	344 (LV)	–	–	–	–	–	–	31%	–	50%	–	19%
YouGov/Yahoo News	Feb 12–13, 2020	348 (LV)	–	–	–	–	–	–	–	44%	42%	–	14%
YouGov Blue/Data for Progress	Jan 18–26, 2020	1,619 (LV)	± 2.6%	53%	–	–	–	–	–	41%	–	–	–
YouGov Blue/Data for Progress	Jan 18–26, 2020	1,619 (LV)	± 2.6%	47%	–	–	–	–	–	–	45%	–	–
Echelon Insights	Jan 20–23, 2020	474 (LV)	–	56%	–	32%	–	–	–	–	–	–	12%
Echelon Insights	Jan 20–23, 2020	474 (LV)	–	54%	–	–	–	–	–	38%	–	–	8%
Echelon Insights	Jan 20–23, 2020	474 (LV)	–	48%	–	–	–	–	–	–	43%	–	9%
Echelon Insights	Dec 9–14, 2019	447 (LV)	–	65%	–	20%	–	–	–	–	–	–	16%
Echelon Insights	Dec 9–14, 2019	447 (LV)	–	58%	–	–	–	–	–	32%	–	–	11%
Echelon Insights	Dec 9–14, 2019	447 (LV)	–	59%	–	–	–	–	–	–	29%	–	11%
Swayable	Nov 16–18, 2019	2,077 (LV)	± 2%	44.8%	–	–	–	–	–	–	34.2%	–	21% (Note: Includes all who did not express for one of the top two candidates)
Swayable	Oct 26–27, 2019	2,172 (LV)	± 2%	45.2%	–	–	–	–	–	–	34.7%	–	20.1%
Echelon Insights	Oct 21–25, 2019	449 (LV)	–	62%	–	–	–	25%	–	–	–	–	13%
Echelon Insights	Oct 21–25, 2019	449 (LV)	–	60%	–	–	–	–	–	28%	–	–	11%
Echelon Insights	Oct 21–25, 2019	449 (LV)	–	49%	–	–	–	–	–	–	34%	–	17%
Swayable	Oct 7–8, 2019	2,077 (LV)	± 2%	48.1%	–	–	–	–	–	–	36.2%	–	15.7%
HarrisX	Oct 4–6, 2019	803 (LV)	–	41%	–	–	–	41%	–	–	–	–	18%
HarrisX	Oct 4–6, 2019	803 (LV)	–	41%	–	–	–	–	–	40%	–	–	19%
HarrisX	Oct 4–6, 2019	803 (LV)	–	42%	–	–	–	–	–	–	39%	–	20%
HarrisX	Oct 4–6, 2019	803 (LV)	–	–	–	–	–	38%	–	42%	–	–	19%
HarrisX	Oct 4–6, 2019	803 (LV)	–	–	–	–	–	40%	–	–	36%	–	24%
HarrisX	Oct 4–6, 2019	803 (LV)	–	–	–	–	–	–	–	42%	40%	–	18%
Swayable	Sep 25–26, 2019	3,491 (LV)	± 2%	47.7%	–	–	–	–	–	–	34.2%	–	18.1%
Morning Consult	Sep 20–22, 2019	635 (LV)	–	52%	–	–	–	–	–	37%	–	–	12%
Morning Consult	Sep 20–22, 2019	635 (LV)	–	45%	–	–	–	–	–	–	38%	–	17%
Morning Consult	Sep 20–22, 2019	635 (LV)	–	–	–	–	–	–	–	38%	49%	–	13%
Swayable	Sep 16–18, 2019	3,140 (LV)	± 2%	49.8%	–	–	–	–	–	31%	–	–	19.2%
Fox News	Sep 15–17, 2019	480(LV)	± 4.5%	53%	–	–	–	–	–	–	37%	–	7%
YouGov/FairVote (Note: But for the first three results listed, 'undecided' voters are not included in the listed percentages.)	Sep 2–6, 2019	1002(LV)	± 3.3%	51%	–	–	–	–	–	40%	–	–	7%
YouGov/FairVote	Sep 2–6, 2019	1002(LV)	± 3.3%	43%	–	–	–	–	–	–	49%	–	6%
YouGov/FairVote	Sep 2–6, 2019	1002(LV)	± 3.3%	–	–	–	–	–	–	36%	55%	–	7%
YouGov/FairVote	Sep 2–6, 2019	1002(LV)	± 3.3%	63.5%	–	36.5%	–	–	–	–	–	–	–
YouGov/FairVote	Sep 2–6, 2019	1002(LV)	± 3.3%	60.4%	–	–	–	39.6%	–	–	–	–	–
YouGov/FairVote	Sep 2–6, 2019	1002(LV)	± 3.3%	86.4%	–	–	–	–	16.4%	–	–	–	–
YouGov/FairVote	Sep 2–6, 2019	1002(LV)	± 3.3%	–	–	44.6%	–	55.4%	–	–	–	–	–
YouGov/FairVote	Sep 2–6, 2019	1002(LV)	± 3.3%	–	–	72.8%	–	–	27.2%	–	–	–	–
YouGov/FairVote	Sep 2–6, 2019	1002(LV)	± 3.3%	–	–	34.6%	–	–	–	65.4%	–	–	–
YouGov/FairVote	Sep 2–6, 2019	1002(LV)	± 3.3%	–	–	20.7%	–	–	–	–	79.3%	–	–
YouGov/FairVote	Sep 2–6, 2019	1002(LV)	± 3.3%	–	–	–	–	79.6%	20.4%	–	–	–	–
YouGov/FairVote	Sep 2–6, 2019	1002(LV)	± 3.3%	–	–	–	–	42.3%	–	57.7%	–	–	–
YouGov/FairVote	Sep 2–6, 2019	1002(LV)	± 3.3%	–	–	–	–	24.6%	–	–	75.4%	–	–
YouGov/FairVote	Sep 2–6, 2019	1002(LV)	± 3.3%	–	–	–	–	–	22.8%	77.2%	–	–	–
YouGov/FairVote	Sep 2–6, 2019	1002(LV)	± 3.3%	–	–	–	–	–	9.9%	–	90.1%	–	–
Swayable	Aug 22–23, 2019	1,849 (LV)	± 2%	46.8%	–	–	–	–	–	30.5%	–	–	22.7%
Echelon Insights	Aug 19–21, 2019	479 (RV)	–	55%	–	–	–	31%	–	–	–	–	14%
Echelon Insights	Aug 19–21, 2019	479 (RV)	–	55%	–	–	–	–	–	35%	–	–	10%
Echelon Insights	Aug 19–21, 2019	479 (RV)	–	52%	–	–	–	–	–	–	32%	–	16%
HarrisX	Aug 16–18, 2019	909 (RV)	–	42%	–	–	–	38%	–	–	–	–	19%
HarrisX	Aug 16–18, 2019	909 (RV)	–	44%	–	–	–	–	–	38%	–	–	18%
HarrisX	Aug 16–18, 2019	909 (RV)	–	39%	–	–	–	–	–	–	41%	–	20%
HarrisX	Aug 16–18, 2019	909 (RV)	–	–	–	–	–	35%	–	42%	–	–	23%
HarrisX	Aug 16–18, 2019	909 (RV)	–	–	–	–	–	38%	–	–	33%	–	30%
HarrisX	Aug 16–18, 2019	909 (RV)	–	–	–	–	–	–	–	43%	37%	–	21%
Swayable	Aug 5–6, 2019	1,958 (LV)	± 2%	46.5%	–	–	–	–	–	30.6%	–	–	22.9%
Echelon Insights	Jul 23–27, 2019	510 (RV)	–	56%	–	–	–	33%	–	–	–	–	11%
Echelon Insights	Jul 23–27, 2019	510 (RV)	–	58%	–	–	–	–	–	29%	–	–	12%
Echelon Insights	Jul 23–27, 2019	510 (RV)	–	54%	–	–	–	–	–	–	35%	–	10%
Swayable	Jul 5–7, 2019	1,921 (LV)	± 2%	43%	–	–	–	–	–	32%	–	–	25%
HarrisX	Jun 28–30, 2019	909 (RV)	± 3.4%	40%	–	–	–	41%	–	–	–	–	20%
HarrisX	Jun 28–30, 2019	909 (RV)	± 3.4%	41%	–	–	–	–	–	40%	–	–	19%
HarrisX	Jun 28–30, 2019	909 (RV)	± 3.4%	41%	–	–	–	–	–	–	40%	–	19%
HarrisX	Jun 28–30, 2019	909 (RV)	± 3.4%	–	–	–	–	39%	–	41%	–	–	20%
HarrisX	Jun 28–30, 2019	909 (RV)	± 3.4%	–	–	–	–	34%	–	–	35%	–	31%
HarrisX	Jun 28–30, 2019	909 (RV)	± 3.4%	–	–	–	–	–	–	41%	36%	–	23%
Echelon Insights	Jun 22–25, 2019	484	–	57%	–	–	–	–	–	27%	–	–	16%
Echelon Insights	Jun 22–25, 2019	484	–	56%	–	–	–	–	–	–	26%	–	18%
Swayable	Jun 1–3, 2019	977 (LV)	± 3%	53.4%	–	–	–	–	–	28.6%	–	–	18%
HarrisX	May 28–30, 2019	881 (RV)	± 3.4%	41%	–	–	–	38%	–	–	–	–	20%
HarrisX	May 28–30, 2019	881 (RV)	± 3.4%	43%	–	–	–	–	–	41%	–	–	16%
HarrisX	May 28–30, 2019	881 (RV)	± 3.4%	39%	–	–	–	–	–	–	41%	–	20%
HarrisX	May 28–30, 2019	881 (RV)	± 3.4%	–	–	–	–	37%	–	42%	–	–	21%
HarrisX	May 28–30, 2019	881 (RV)	± 3.4%	–	–	–	–	–	–	37%	40%	–	23%
Echelon Insights	May 20–21, 2019	447	–	65%	–	17%	–	–	–	–	–	–	19%
Echelon Insights	May 20–21, 2019	447	–	63%	–	–	–	20%	–	–	–	–	17%
Echelon Insights	May 20–21, 2019	447	–	61%	–	–	–	–	–	25%	–	–	14%
Echelon Insights	May 20–21, 2019	447	–	66%	–	–	–	–	–	–	19%	–	15%
Morning Consult/Politico	Jan 11–16, 2018	689 (RV)	± 4.0%	54%	–	–	–	–	–	–	–	31%	15%
Morning Consult/Politico	Jan 11–16, 2018	689 (RV)	± 4.0%	–	–	–	23%	–	–	–	–	44%	34%
Morning Consult/Politico	Jan 11–16, 2018	689 (RV)	± 4.0%	–	–	–	–	–	–	46%	–	37%	17%
Morning Consult/Politico	Jan 11–16, 2018	689 (RV)	± 4.0%	–	–	–	–	–	–	–	35%	39%	26%

== Favorability ratings ==
Unlike traditional preference polling, favorability ratings allow individuals to independently rate each candidate. This provides a comprehensive impression of a candidate's electorate appeal without vote splitting distortion, where votes divide between ideologically similar candidates in multi-candidate polls. Favorability indicates general candidate acceptance among voters, irrespective of final vote choice. The table uses net favorability (favorable minus unfavorable).

=== From February 2020 to April 2020 ===
Favorability ratings from February 2020 to April 2020
Poll source	Date(s) administered	Biden	Sanders	Gabbard	Warren	Bloomberg	Klobuchar	Buttigieg	Steyer	Patrick	Bennet	Yang
YouGov/Economist	Apr 26–28, 2020	51%										
Emerson College	Apr 26–28, 2020	61.1%										
YouGov/Economist	Apr 19–21, 2020	54%										
Morning Consult/Politico	Apr 18–19, 2020	66%										
Morning Consult	Apr 13–19, 2020	60%										
YouGov/Economist	Apr 12–14, 2020	54%										
Morning Consult	Apr 6–12, 2020	57%										
YouGov/Economist	Apr 5–7, 2020	58%	52%									
Fox News	Apr 4–7, 2020	61%										
Monmouth	Apr 3–7, 2020	57%	45%									
Quinnipiac	Apr 2–6, 2020	66%										
Morning Consult	Mar 31 - Apr 5, 2020	56%	51%									
YouGov/Economist	Mar 29–31, 2020	43%	52%									
Selzer & Co./Grinnell College	Mar 27–30, 2020	59%	49%									
Morning Consult	Mar 23–29, 2020	56%	49%									
YouGov/Economist	Mar 22–24, 2020	47%	39%									
Monmouth	Mar 18–22, 2020	69%										
Morning Consult	Mar 16–22, 2020	56%	50%									
YouGov/Economist	Mar 15–17, 2020	50%	50%	−14%								
Ipsos/Reutuers	Mar 13–16, 2020	62%	58%									
Morning Consult	Mar 11–15, 2020	57%	52%	−6%								
NBC/WSJ (Note: Net favorability calculated as (proportion that feel positive about the candidate - proportion that does not feel positive about the candidate))	Mar 11–13, 2020	55%	51%									
YouGov/Hofstra University	Mar 5–12, 2020	74.1%	53.4%		71.6%							
YouGov/Economist	Mar 8–10, 2020	47%	40%									
Ipsos/Reuters	Mar 6–9, 2020	70%	59%									
Morning Consult	Mar 5–8, 2020	55%	46%	−10%								
Quinnipiac	Mar 5–8, 2020	64%	54%									
CNN/SSRS	Mar 4–7, 2020	51%	40%		39%	−11%						
YouGov/Economist	Mar 1–3, 2020	41%	36%	−23%	50%	−7%	36%	36%				
YouGov/Yahoo News	Feb 26–27, 2020	57%	57%		60%	15%	48%	44%				
Change Research/Election Science (Note: Net favorability calculated as approval voting total)	Feb 25–27, 2020	36%	60%	7%	55%	20%	28%	39%	13%			
Morning Consult	Feb 23–27, 2020	40%	52%	−8%	35%	17%	26%	35%	16%			
Fox News	Feb 23–26, 2020	47%	48%		38%	22%	27%	35%	17%			
YouGov/Economist	Feb 23–25, 2020	37%	51%	−26%	52%	−12%	36%	26%	19%			
Morning Consult	Feb 20, 2020					17%						
YouGov/Economist	Feb 16–18, 2020	39%	46%	−28%	53%	15%	41%	43%	26%			
Morning Consult	Feb 12–17, 2020	39%	53%	−7%	36%	36%	32%	41%	18%			
YouGov/Economist	Feb 9–11, 2020	34%	48%	−20%	51%	28%	35%	39%	33%	11%	17%	51%
Ipsos/Reuters	Feb 6–10, 2020	56%	65%		56%	53%	36%	49%	26%			
Monmouth	Feb 6–9, 2020	38%	53%		48%	14%	31%	36%				
Quinnipiac	Feb 5–9, 2020	54%	58%		60%	40%	49%	47%	20%			32%
Morning Consult	Feb 4–9, 2020	43%	53%	−6%	41%	40%	28%	42%	21%	4%	8%	35%
Ipsos/FiveThirtyEight	Feb 7–8, 2020	33.9%	42.8%		37.1%		23.1%	35.8%	12.9%			20.7%
Ipsos/FiveThirtyEight	Feb 4–6, 2020	39.5%	41.5%		38.3%		19.6%	33.8%	11.4%			21.6%
YouGov/Economist	Feb 2–4, 2020	40%	38%	−27%	49%	26%	32%	40%	29%	11%	19%	46%
Morning Consult	Jan 27 – Feb 2, 2020	47%	53%	−7%	44%	37%	23%	33%	23%	5%	8%	35%

=== From October 2019 to January 2020 ===
Favorability ratings from October 2019 to January 2020
Poll source	Date(s) administered	Biden	Sanders	Gabbard	Warren	Bloomberg	Klobuchar	Buttigieg	Steyer	Patrick	Bennet	Yang	Delaney	Booker	Williamson	Castro	Harris	Bullock	Sestak	Messam	O'Rourke	Ryan
YouGov/Economist	Jan 26–28, 2020	40%	45%	−30%	58%	12%	33%	38%	19%	8%	11%	47%	1%									
Morning Consult	Jan 20–26, 2020	52%	52%	−5%	43%	33%	25%	35%	22%	4%	11%	36%	5%									
Echelon Insights	Jan 20–23, 2020	51%	52%		50%	44%		47%														
YouGov/Economist	Jan 19–21, 2020	50%	50%	−19%	57%	22%	36%	37%	30%	4%	15%	47%	−1%									
Monmouth	Jan 16–20, 2020	52%	48%		42%	17%	32%	27%	6%			35%										
Morning Consult	Jan 15–19, 2020	51%	53%	−6%	44%	32%	24%	34%	24%	5%	10%	36%	4%									
Ipsos/FiveThirtyEight	Jan 14–15, 2020	43.6%	44.2%		47.1%		18.1%	31.2%	15%													
YouGov/Economist	Jan 11–14, 2020	43%	49%	−34%	53%	11%	21%	29%	15%	1%	3%	28%	−7%	42%								
Ipsos/FiveThirtyEight	Jan 10–13, 2020	45.3%	47.8%		43.3%		12.3%	26.5%	9.9%													
Morning Consult	Jan 6–12, 2020	49%	59%	−6%	47%	23%	21%	34%	21%	6%	8%	32%	4%	32%								
YouGov/Economist	Jan 5–7, 2020	43%	55%	−31%	60%	4%	26%	36%	19%	8%	10%	34%	−2%	44%	−22%							
Morning Consult	Dec 30, 2019 – Jan 5, 2020	52%	56%	−8%	44%	17%	21%	34%	20%	4%	8%	31%	3%	29%	−6%							
YouGov/Economist	Dec 28–31, 2019	48%	49%	−25%	55%	−6%	32%	32%	23%	6%	9%	39%	−2%	40%	−21%	34%						
Morning Consult	Dec 23–29, 2019	51%	56%	−8%	55%	15%	22%	35%	19%	5%	8%	32%	4%	31%	−3%	17%						
YouGov/Economist	Dec 22–24, 2019	42%	48%	−40%	59%	−5%	28%	35%	19%	6%	6%	40%	−1%	48%	−21%	38%						
Morning Consult	Dec 20–22, 2019	49%	55%	−12%	44%	17%	26%	33%	19%	4%	8%	34%	3%	28%	−5%	19%						
Ipsos/FiveThirtyEight	Dec 19–20, 2019	45%	42.6%		42.9%		17.1%	27.6%	7.4%			22.3%										
Ipsos/FiveThirtyEight	Dec 13–18, 2019	43.2%	40.5%		40.1%		11%	29.4%	4.2%			16.1%										
YouGov/Economist	Dec 14–17, 2019	45%	47%	−21%	56%	−3%	26%	27%	15%	1%	9%	35%	−3%	38%	−17%	29%						
CNN/SSRS	Dec 12–15, 2019	42%	54%		47%			32%														
Morning Consult	Dec 9–15, 2019	49%	57%	−1%	44%	14%	21%	30%	15%	4%	10%	27%	4%	31%	−4%	17%						
Echelon Insights	Dec 9–14, 2019	67%	56%		48%	14%		40%														
YouGov/Economist	Dec 7–10, 2019	45%	49%	−19%	55%	−9%	25%	33%	5%	3%	5%	25%	−9%	41%	−17%	27%						
Quinnipiac	Dec 4–9, 2019	56%	60%		54%	9%	32%	39%														
Monmouth	Dec 4–8, 2019	56%	53%		61%	1%		35%				25%										
Morning Consult	Dec 2–8, 2019	50%	57%	−5%	47%	13%	22%	32%	15%	4%	6%	28%	3%	32%	−5%	18%						
YouGov/Economist	Dec 1–3, 2019	43%	48%	−19%	53%	−5%	23%	37%	8%	6%	11%	28%	−1%	43%	−18%	38%	37%	7%	−2%			
Morning Consult	Nov 25 – Dec 1, 2019	50%	54%	−4%	42%	9%	20%	34%	14%	5%	8%	26%	1%	28%	−4%	17%	28%					
YouGov/Economist	Nov 24–26, 2019	46%	51%	−17%	52%	−11%	29%	38%	8%	4%	12%	30%	5%	46%	−14%	31%	37%	8%	1%			
Morning Consult	Nov 21–24, 2019	45%	56%	−6%	44%	1%	18%	35%	11%	1%	6%	28%	2%	32%	−5%	17%	32%	4%				
Ipsos/Reuters	Nov 21–22, 2019	55%	68%		57%	3%		38%		−6%												
Ipsos/FiveThirtyEight	Nov 20–21, 2019	44.5%	44%	−17%	48.7%		14.3%	37.3%	2.1%			16.9%		26.3%			25.9%					
YouGov/Economist	Nov 17–19, 2019	50%	45%	−20%	59%	4%	28%	46%	10%	6%	13%	31%	0%	39%	−15%	31%	37%	8%	1%	−3%		
Ipsos/FiveThirtyEight	Nov 14–18, 2019	47.9%	42.7%	−12.5%	46.2%		10.3%	34.4%	1.3%			12.4%		24.6%			24.8%					
Morning Consult	Nov 11–17, 2019	52%	57%	0%	48%	5%	20%	34%	11%	4%	10%	24%	3%	31%	−6%	16%	29%	4%				
Ipsos/Reuters	Nov 12–14, 2019	62%	67%		59%	15%		45%														
YouGov/Economist	Nov 10–12, 2019	37%	52%		58%	6%	25%	38%	−2%	13%	−5%	29%		44%	−21%	30%	41%	−3%		−1%		
Morning Consult	Nov 4–10, 2019	54%	56%		50%		25%	32%	−1%	3%	3%	13%		16%			36%	5%	−6%		22%	
YouGov/Economist	Nov 3–5, 2019	42%	50%	−16%	64%		23%	39%	16%		9%	30%	−3%	37%	−13%	32%	36%	4%	3%	−2%		
Change Research/Crooked Media	Oct 31 – Nov 3, 2019	42%	48%		63%			46%									35%					
Monmouth	Oct 30 – Nov 3, 2019	57%	47%		70%			33%									33%					
Morning Consult	Oct 28 – Nov 3, 2019	54%	56%	−1%	50%		22%	33%	13%		5%	25%	3%	32%	−6%	16%	36%	3%				
YouGov/Kalikow School at Hofstra University	Oct 25–31, 2019	66.7%	69.6%		70.6%																	
YouGov/Economist	Oct 27–29, 2019	49%	51%	−13%	62%		21%	45%	5%		11%	30%	0%	39%	−17%	29%	37%	5%	−5%	−5%	35%	
Morning Consult	Oct 21–27, 2019	55%	59%	−2%	53%		18%	35%	12%		8%	26%	4%	31%	−5%	15%	36%	6%			27%	5%
Echelon Insights	Oct 21–25, 2019	58%	53%		61%			43%									40%					
YouGov/Economist	Oct 20–22, 2019	39%	53%	−8%	64%		24%	42%	12%		10%	27%	0%	43%	−16%	31%	38%	5%	−3%	0%	33%	1%
CNN/SSRS	Oct 17–20, 2019	54%	58%		50%		22%	39%						46%								
Morning Consult	Oct 16–20, 2019	49%	56%	3%	54%		23%	36%	12%		5%	26%	5%	32%	−6%	19%	36%	5%			30%	5%
Ipsos/Reuters (Note: Calculated using net favorability amongst Democratic registered voters who know the candidate * % of Democratic registered voters who know the candidate, to 2 decimal places)	Oct 17–18, 2019	66.91%	55.83%	9.59%	61.59%		25.38%	33.66%	14.9%			27.17%		36.13%		20.66%	40.64%				29.84%	
Morning Consult	Oct 16, 2019	48%	55%	8%	51%		25%	43%	13%		11%	29%	5%	31%	−5%	19%	35%	5%			29%	9%
Ipsos/FiveThirtyEight	Oct 15–16, 2019	48.6%	45.3%	−6.7%	54.3%		15%	33.5%	2%			14.5%		25.3%		8.2%	28.4%				17%	
YouGov/Economist	Oct 13–15, 2019	45%	48%	5%	63%		27%	43%	8%		12%	31%	1%	37%	−11%	31%	39%	9%	1%	−2%	37%	1%
Lord Ashcroft Polls	Oct 1–15, 2019 (Note: Net favorability calculated as (net favorability among exclusively Dem. primary voters * proportion of Dem. primary voters that are exclusively Dem. primary voters) + (net favorability among voters in both Dem. and Rep. primaries * proportion of Dem. primary voters that are voters in both Dem. and Rep. primaries). Net favorability for a single category calculated as (% of category which rates candidate > 0 - % of category which rates candidate < 0).)	55.05%	58.30%		44.17%		4.93%	14.68%				13.71%		17.89%			28.58%				17.68%	
Ipsos/FiveThirtyEight	Oct 7–14, 2019	47.4%	43.1%	2.2%	52.1%		11.8%	31%	−0.8%			14.2%		26.3%		11.6%	30.7%				22.6%	
HarrisX	Oct 12–13, 2019	62%	44%	11%	53%		16%	34%	13%			21%		31%		20%	38%				31%	
Quinnipiac	Oct 11–13, 2019	60%	54%		70%																	
Morning Consult	Oct 7–12, 2019	55%	57%	11%	51%		20%	33%	10%		4%	25%	3%	31%	−2%	16%	36%	5%			28%	3%
Fox News	Oct 6–8, 2019	58%	63%		63%			38%						35%			41%				34%	
YouGov/Economist	Oct 6–8, 2019	40%	55%	0%	66%		23%	42%	7%		8%	33%	−3%	41%	−17%	27%	36%	8%	1%	0%	29%	3%
Morning Consult	Sep 30 – Oct 6, 2019	53%	55%	11%	54%		20%	34%	8%		9%	23%	0%	33%	−2%	17%	38%	3%			31%	5%
YouGov/Economist	Sep 28 – Oct 1, 2019	36%	37%	−1%	60%		25%	46%	9%		13%	32%	−1%	38%	−21%	29%	32%	8%	1%	−2%	35%	5%

=== Before October 2019 ===
Favorability polling prior to October 2019
Poll source	Date(s) administered	Biden	Sanders	Gabbard	Warren	Bloomberg	Klobuchar	Buttigieg	Steyer	Bennet	Yang	Delaney	Booker	Williamson	Castro	Harris	Bullock	Sestak	Messam	O'Rourke	Ryan	de Blasio	Gillibrand	Moulton	Inslee	Hickenlooper	Gravel	Swalwell
Monmouth	Sep 23–29, 2019	52%	56%		66%			41%			25%					42%												
Morning Consult	Sep 23–29, 2019	54%	54%	9%	52%		21%	35%	9%	8%	23%	2%	31%	−3%	14%	35%	3%			30%	4%							
YouGov/Economist	Sep 22–24, 2019	46%	49%	10%	63%		20%	42%	9%	9%	32%	1%	34%	−8%	26%	40%	6%	2%	0%	33%	4%							
Quinnipiac	Sep 19–23, 2019	53%	47%		64%		22%	39%	−1%		13%		31%		7%	34%				25%								
Morning Consult	Sep 16–22, 2019	50%	53%	9%	52%		23%	34%	7%	7%	24%	4%	33%	−3%	8%	35%	4%			30%	3%							
YouGov/Economist	Sep 14–17, 2019	41%	43%	33%	60%		23%	44%	2%	9%	24%	−5%	35%	−17%	8%	30%	2%	−6%	−8%	38%	−6%	−11%						
HarrisX	Sep 14–16, 2019	64%	53%		49%		14%	35%			17%		33%		14%	37%				33%								
Ipsos/FiveThirtyEight	Sep 12–16, 2019	47.1%	44.3%		52.9%		11.8%	35.8%			14.5%		29.4%		9.6%	32.5%				31.2%								
Morning Consult	Sep 13–15, 2019	54%	59%	11%	52%		21%	33%	8%	6%	22%	3%	30%	−6%	11%	38%	6%			31%	1%	−4%						
HarrisX	Sep 10–11, 2019	60%	58%		50%		24%	30%			27%		33%		27%	34%				34%								
Ipsos/FiveThirtyEight	Sep 5–11, 2019	45.7%	44%		48.5%		8.1%	32.2%			14.8%		26.7%		19.8%	31.4%				23.9%								
Ipsos/Reuters	Sep 9–10, 2019	72.9%	73.92%	16.52%	57.6%		24.48%	32.66%	15.08%	11.34%	26.98%	14.04%	34.5%	13.44%	22.94%	48.18%	10.4%	6.76%	5.76%	39.42%	16.43%	20.91%						
YouGov/Economist	Sep 8–10, 2019	39%	46%	0%	61%		19%	42%	8%	12%	33%	−2%	35%	−15%	38%	42%	6%	0%	−6%	33%	−3%	−8%						
NPR/PBS/Marist	Sep 5–8, 2019	49%	39%		64%		17%	41%	−1%		19%		38%		26%	39%				29%								
Morning Consult	Sep 2–8, 2019	52%	57%	10%	49%		20%	36%	9%	10%	25%	5%	33%	−1%	21%	38%	7%			31%	2%	−2%						
YouGov/FairVote	Sep 2–6, 2019	43%	45%	−4%	61%		15%	40%	−2%	5%	25%	−11%	31%	−20%	32%	38%	0%	−2%	−4%	29%	−5%	−22%						
ABC/Washington Post	Sep 2–5, 2019	65%	70%		63%			41%								47%												
YouGov/Economist	Sep 1–3, 2019	36%	50%	3%	60%		10%	30%	0%	8%	31%	−1%	34%	−10%	31%	39%	2%	−3%	−3%	34%	0%	−9%						
Morning Consult	Aug 26 – Sep 1, 2019	52%	55%	11%	49%		20%	32%	9%	8%	22%	3%	31%	−1%	22%	38%	6%			34%	3%	−3%	20%					
YouGov/Economist	Aug 24–27, 2019	48%	55%	12%	64%		29%	48%	8%	12%	32%	−3%	41%	−3%	42%	50%	7%	3%	1%	42%	−2%	−1%	26%					
Morning Consult	Aug 19–25, 2019	56%	57%	13%	48%		20%	34%	11%	7%	23%	3%	31%	0%	23%	35%	7%			34%	6%	−1%	20%					
Echelon Insights	Aug 19–21, 2019	59%	55%		42%			28%								43%												
YouGov/Economist	Aug 17–20, 2019	40%	53%	2%	63%		14%	37%	6%	7%	22%	−8%	36%	−8%	33%	40%	6%	−5%	−4%	33%	−1%	−8%	12%	−3%	11%			
Monmouth	Aug 16–20, 2019	41%	40%		52%		9%	29%	−16%		12%		35%	−11%	22%	39%	9%	−6%		19%								
Morning Consult	Aug 12–18, 2019	52%	55%	10%	48%		19%	36%	10%	8%	23%	3%	34%	0%	23%	37%	6%			36%	6%	−2%	20%	0%	9%			
HarrisX	Aug 14–15, 2019	51%	45%					25%	6%	4%	21%			0%		40%	10%	2%	3%				23%	−3%		8%		
HarrisX	Aug 13–14, 2019			2%	46%		14%					6%	25%		17%					29%	8%	0%			9%			
Fox News	Aug 11–13, 2019	66%	75%		71%											61%												
YouGov/Economist	Aug 10–13, 2019	41%	39%	4%	60%		20%	45%	5%	12%	32%	1%	36%	−8%	34%	42%	9%	3%	−1%	44%	1%	−17%	20%	−3%	18%	5%		
Morning Consult	Aug 5–11, 2019	57%	53%	12%	47%		20%	32%	11%	7%	21%	2%	29%	1%	21%	36%	7%			34%	6%	−4%	18%	3%	9%	9%		
YouGov/Economist	Aug 3–6, 2019	39%	43%	4%	53%		20%	40%	4%	11%	23%	−3%	36%	−9%	31%	30%	6%	−3%	2%	28%	−1%	−8%	17%	−2%	16%	6%	−1%	
Morning Consult	Aug 1–4, 2019	55%	52%	12%	46%		20%	33%	8%	8%	19%	2%	26%	0%	24%	30%	5%			23%	1%	−7%	17%	2%	9%	6%		
Public Policy Polling	Aug 1–4, 2019	59%	36%	<7%	35%		12%	24%	<7%	7%	9%	<7%	27%	<7%	20%	26%	<7%	<7%	<7%	13%	<7%	<7%	<7%	<7%	<7%	<7%	<7%	
YouGov/Economist (Note: This poll's favorability ratings were the first to be calculated using the "Democratic Primary Voter" subsample. All YouGov/Economist polls' favorability ratings before this date are calculated with the "Democratic Party member" subsample.)	Jul 27–30, 2019	47%	45%	2%	65%		22%	43%	5%	−2%	16%	−2%	39%	−4%	39%	48%	11%	−1%	5%	30%	−14%	−5%	9%	−2%	17%	3%	−2%	
HarrisX	Jul 28–29, 2019	61%	38%					30%	18%	9%	18%			8%		43%	10%	13%	12%				22%	14%		12%	13%	
HarrisX	Jul 27–28, 2019			11%	49%		15%					10%	29%		22%					27%	14%	9%			8%			9%
Morning Consult	Jul 22–28, 2019	56%	52%	9%	45%		21%	33%	9%	7%	15%	3%	30%	−3%	23%	41%	5%			27%	4%	−5%	21%	3%	9%	9%		
Democracy Corps	Jul 18–28, 2019		51%		43%			31%								39%												
Echelon Insights	Jul 23–27, 2019	59%	57%		46%			38%								50%												
YouGov/Economist (Note: This poll's favorability ratings were the last to be calculated using the "Democratic Party member" subsample. All YouGov/Economist polls' favorability ratings after this date are calculated with the "Democratic Primary Voter" subsample.)	Jul 21–23, 2019	47%	43%	2%	55%		30%	41%	9%	14%	14%	5%	42%	−5%	41%	48%	11%	6%	3%	36%	4%	3%	21%	8%	20%	15%	6%	
Morning Consult	Jul 15–21, 2019	54%	51%	11%	45%		20%	33%	7%	9%	14%	5%	31%	−2%	21%	44%	5%			26%	4%	−3%	22%	2%	8%	8%		
YouGov/Economist	Jul 14–16, 2019	51%	46%	3%	59%		29%	39%	6%	10%	12%	4%	48%	−7%	39%	54%	6%	4%	0%	33%	9%	4%	22%	2%	18%	10%	4%	
Morning Consult	Jul 8–14, 2019	51%	52%	7%	46%		16%	34%		5%	12%	2%	30%	−7%	24%	40%	4%			25%	2%	−4%	18%	0%	7%	8%		5%
Gallup	Jul 1–12, 2019	52%	55%		46%		18%	33%					31%		21%	43%				18%		1%						
YouGov/Economist	Jul 7–9, 2019	47%	41%	6%	55%		24%	40%		10%	4%	−2%	35%	−16%	35%	49%	6%	1%	−6%	28%	4%	1%	20%	−1%	11%	3%	1%	9%
Morning Consult	Jul 1–7, 2019	56%	57%	7%	50%		20%	35%		6%	12%	3%	30%	−2%	25%	41%	4%			26%	3%	−3%	13%	9%	9%	5%		6%
YouGov/Economist	Jun 30 – Jul 2, 2019	47%	43%	10%	58%		31%	43%		13%	15%	7%	49%	−11%	47%	59%	12%	4%	3%	32%	10%	2%	27%	6%	21%	14%	1%	17%
CNN/SSRS	Jun 28–30, 2019	51%	49%		52%			37%					26%		34%	50%												
Morning Consult/FiveThirtyEight	Jun 26–30, 2019	54.8%	57.8%	9.1%	60.8%		23.1%	37.6%		7.2%	13.5%	3%	40.4%	−4.8%	35.4%	54.1%				24.2%	5.1%	−1.7%	19.6%		7.2%	4%		7.3%
HarrisX	Jun 28–29, 2019	51%	45%					26%		3%	−4%			−4%		40%	4%	−6%	−6%				16%	−4%		−4%	−1%	10%
HarrisX	Jun 27–28, 2019			12%	52%		18%					9%	32%		32%					29%	17%	7%			17%			
Morning Consult	Jun 27–28, 2019	50%	44%	4%	51%		19%	37%		6%	10%	1%	33%	−1%	25%	41%	7%			20%	4%	−6%	15%	1%	4%	10%		4%
HarrisX	Jun 26–27, 2019	63%	49%					32%		8%	17%			8%		42%	7%	6%	6%				24%	4%		−8%	8%	11%
HarrisX	Jun 25–26, 2019			10%	42%		22%					12%	30%		19%					40%	14%	2%			11%			
Morning Consult/FiveThirtyEight	Jun 19–26, 2019	60.4%	56.7%	5.8%	49.9%		19.9%	35.2%		8.6%	15.2	6.8%	33.9%	4.2%	20%	44.9%				35.9%	7.7%	−2.1%	21%		9.1%	7.5%		9.8%
YouGov/Economist	Jun 22–25, 2019	56%	50%	2%	56%		28%	39%		11%	16%	8%	43%	10%	30%	47%	9%		4%	42%	7%	−2%	27%	5%	15%	10%	4%	17%
Echelon Insights	Jun 22–25, 2019	64%	53%		46%			33%								40%												
Morning Consult	Jun 17–23, 2019	60%	57%	6%	44%		22%	32%		6%	13%	4%	29%	4%	18%	37%	7%			32%	4%	−2%	19%	4%	7%	9%		7%
YouGov/Economist	Jun 16–18, 2019	48%	43%	4%	54%		25%	43%		12%	14%	5%	45%	3%	26%	47%	8%		5%	40%	5%	−4%	26%	3%	15%	10%	3%	19%
Morning Consult	Jun 10–16, 2019	62%	56%	6%	45%		20%	33%		10%	13%	6%	34%	6%	18%	40%	7%			34%	5%	0%	22%	3%	11%	9%		10%
WPA Intelligence (R)	Jun 10–13, 2019	71%	55%		57%			48%					49%			63%				50%								
YouGov/Economist	Jun 9–11, 2019	47%	39%	−3%	49%		16%	42%		7%	7%	3%	36%	−2%	24%	45%	4%		−2%	32%	9%	−7%	24%	0%	13%	−1%	−1%	9%
Morning Consult	Jun 3–9, 2019	62%	55%	7%	43%		20%	31%		7%	11%	6%	33%	6%	17%	40%	6%			33%	9%	−2%	21%	4%	10%	8%		9%
YouGov/Economist	Jun 2–4, 2019	54%	47%	0%	55%		26%	42%		10%	13%	3%	47%	3%	30%	54%	6%		2%	38%	9%	7%	26%	7%	16%	11%	−1%	21%
Morning Consult	May 27 – Jun 2, 2019	61%	55%	4%	40%		19%	32%		4%	10%	4%	31%	3%	16%	38%	3%			33%	5%	0%	18%	4%	6%	5%		6%
CNN/SSRS	May 28–31, 2019	65%	61%		52%			33%		3%						43%	−2%					−3%						
Morning Consult	May 20–26, 2019	62%	57%	5%	36%		19%	29%		4%	10%	5%	32%	3%	15%	40%	4%			35%	1%	0%	22%	2%	9%	7%		8%
Echelon Insights	May 20–21, 2019	72%	53%		38%			33%								43%												
Change Research	May 18–21, 2019	48%	50%	7%	67%		20%				14%	2%	38%	1%	25%	56%			0%	40%	0%	−7%	18%	1%	12%	5%		13%
Monmouth	May 16–20, 2019	57%	44%	7%	46%		22%	24%		11%	−1%	1%	28%	0%	18%	49%	0%		−6%	21%	0%	−9%	11%	2%	9%	11%	−5%	11%
Quinnipiac	May 16–20, 2019	65%	50%	−2%	45%		20%	34%		7%	3%	5%	36%	3%	19%	46%	2%		0%	21%	2%	−22%	14%	−3%	12%	6%		8%
Morning Consult	May 13–19, 2019	62%	58%	5%	41%		18%	31%		5%	9%	5%	33%	3%	15%	37%	4%			36%	4%	1%	18%	2%	7%	7%		7%
Morning Consult	May 6–12, 2019	63%	57%	6%	36%		16%	31%		5%	10%	5%	31%		17%	38%	1%			31%	0%	6%	19%	1%	8%	7%		8%
Morning Consult	Apr 29 – May 5, 2019	61%	55%	6%	40%		19%	29%			7%	4%	31%		15%	38%	3%			31%	2%		18%	1%	7%	7%		
Gallup	Apr 17–30, 2019	60%	57%		40%			30%					31%			42%				26%								
CNN/SSRS	Apr 25–28, 2019	69%						26%													3%		14%	−5%				3%
Morning Consult	Apr 22–28, 2019	62%	58%	5%	39%		16%	27%			8%	5%	32%		16%	37%	2%			33%	2%		18%	2%	8%	8%		
Morning Consult	Apr 15–21, 2019	61%	59%	5%	36%		15%	29%			10%	5%	32%		16%	37%	3%			36%	3%		18%		10%	7%		
Change Research	Apr 12–15, 2019	56%	45%	7%	52%		22%	52%		6%	8%	2%	43%	2%	31%	51%			0%	49%	2%		15%		9%	5%		14%
Echelon Insights	April 17–19, 2019	54%	62%					24%								27%				32%								
Monmouth	Apr 11–15, 2019	56%	44%		32%		14%	29%					24%			40%				31%								
Morning Consult	Apr 8–14, 2019	60%	58%	5%	35%		16%	23%			10%	4%	31%		16%	36%	4%			35%	1%		16%		8%	9%		
Morning Consult	Apr 1–7, 2019	60%	57%	6%	35%		19%	20%			5%	3%	33%		14%	34%	3%			35%	0%		19%		6%	7%		
Morning Consult	Mar 25–31, 2019	67%	63%	5%	37%		18%	14%				4%	31%		15%	36%	3%			32%			20%		8%	8%		
Morning Consult	Mar 18–24, 2019	68%	60%	5%	34%		15%	11%				3%	33%		14%	36%	2%			33%			18%		7%	7%		
CNN/SSRS	Mar 14–17, 2019		60%				13%						33%							36%					8%	5%		
Morning Consult	Mar 11–17, 2019	65%	60%	5%	38%		15%	8%				3%	28%		17%	35%	3%			34%			18%		7%	6%		
Change Research	Mar 8–10, 2019	71%	53%		62%											49%				57%								
Morning Consult	Mar 4–10, 2019	68%	60%	5%	36%		15%	6%				3%	30%		13%	40%	2%			36%			18%		5%	4%		
Monmouth	Mar 1–4, 2019	63%	53%		30%	1%	13%			6%			31%	4%		42%	0%			26%		−6%			7%			
Morning Consult	Feb 25 – Mar 3, 2019	68%	60%	5%	35%	10%	15%	6%				3%	31%		13%	41%	2%			35%			18%		5%	4%		
Gallup	Feb 12–28, 2019	71%			35%		21%						33%			42%							22%					
Morning Consult	Feb 18–24, 2019	64%	60%	4%	37%	10%	18%	5%				4%	28%		15%	35%	2%			33%			17%		2%	5%		
Morning Consult	Feb 11–17, 2019	67%	61%	3%	39%	13%	22%	5%				2%	34%		15%	40%	3%			32%			21%		2%	4%		
Morning Consult	Feb 4–10, 2019	69%	57%	2%	34%	12%	15%	4%				3%	31%		13%	41%	1%			31%			18%		5%	5%		
Morning Consult/Politico	Feb 1–2, 2019	74%	61%		43%		18%						38%			43%				37%								
CNN/SSRS	Jan 30 – Feb 2, 2019			2%	41%			4%							16%	43%							15%					
Morning Consult/Politico	Jan 25–27, 2019	69%	55%		45%		12%	3%					26%			41%				26%								
Monmouth	Jan 25–27, 2019	71%	49%	12%	40%	10%	15%	2%			0%	9%	33%		15%	33%				32%			16%		3%	4%		
Morning Consult/Politico	Jan 18–22, 2019	66%	58%		46%		15%						30%			38%				33%			22%					
HarrisX	Jan 15–16, 2019			3%										12%											9%			
Morning Consult/Politico	Jan 11–14, 2019	68%	57%		39%		15%						30%			35%				29%								
NPR/PBS/Marist	Jan 10–13, 2019	64%	29%		36%	0%	13%						30%		13%	26%				29%			8%					
Morning Consult/Politico	Jan 4–6, 2019	71%	59%		33%		8%						26%			27%				30%								
HarrisX	Jan 3–4, 2019	64%	52%		48%	7%	21%		20%				45%		22%	37%				38%			25%					
Change Research	Dec 14–17, 2018	80%	65%	20%	61%	20%	28%					4%	50%		27%	53%				63%								14%
Quinnipiac	Dec 12–17, 2018	77%	61%		48%	17%							41%			37%				41%			21%					
CNN/SSRS	Dec 6–9, 2018	66%	64%		38%								30%			31%				34%								
Morning Consult/Politico	Nov 7–9, 2018																			32%								
GQR Research	Jul 21–26, 2018	53%	57%		34%																							
RABA Research	Jan 10–11, 2018	72%	57%		53%																							
Public Policy Polling	Dec 3–6, 2016	67%	67%		46%								19%		0%								9%					

== See also ==
- Statewide opinion polling for the 2020 Democratic Party presidential primaries
- 2020 Democratic National Convention
- Opinion polling for the 2020 Republican Party presidential primaries
- Nationwide opinion polling for the 2020 United States presidential election
- Statewide opinion polling for the 2020 United States presidential election

== Notes ==
Partisan clients

Additional candidates
