= Results of the 2020 Democratic Party presidential primaries =

Results of the Democratic Party presidential primaries

This article contains the results of the 2020 Democratic Party presidential primaries and caucuses, the processes by which the Democratic Party selected delegates to attend the 2020 Democratic National Convention from August 17–20, 2020. The series of primaries, caucuses, and state conventions culminated in the national convention, where the delegates cast their votes to formally select a candidate. A simple majority (1,990) of the total delegate votes (3,979) was required to become the nominee.

The campaign for the 2020 Democratic presidential nomination began on July 28, 2017, when Maryland Congressman John Delaney became the first candidate to announce his run for president. By April 2019, more than 20 major candidates were recognized by national and state polls, causing the field of 2020 major Democratic presidential candidates to exceed the field of major candidates in the 2016 Republican Party presidential primaries as the largest presidential candidate field for any single U.S. political party in a single election cycle. With the addition of Michael Bloomberg on November 24, 2019, the number of major Democratic presidential candidates in the 2020 Democratic primaries totaled 29.

When voting began in the 2020 Iowa caucuses, 11 major candidates were actively campaigning. Democratic primaries and caucuses in early states yielded a controversial and disputed victory for Pete Buttigieg in the Iowa caucuses, a narrow victory for Bernie Sanders in the New Hampshire primary over Buttigieg, a victory for Sanders in the Nevada caucuses, and a victory for Joe Biden in the South Carolina primary. Sanders won the popular vote in both Iowa and New Hampshire, with New Hampshire generally considered a win for Sanders. Before the March 3, 2020, Super Tuesday primaries, six major candidates ended their campaigns; Bloomberg and Elizabeth Warren ended their campaigns due to poor showings on Super Tuesday. Tulsi Gabbard ended her campaign on March 19. Sanders ended his campaign on April 8, leaving Biden as the only major candidate. Biden won a majority of delegates on June 2 and was formally nominated on August 20, 2020.

== Overview of results ==
Map legend
Joe Biden
Michael Bloomberg
Pete Buttigieg
Amy Klobuchar
Bernie Sanders
Tom Steyer
Elizabeth Warren
Tie
A map of 2020 Democratic Party presidential primary and caucus results. It reflects the winners, measured by the number of pledged delegates, in each state.

A map of 2020 Democratic Party presidential primary and caucus results by county.

== Major candidates ==
The table below shows candidates who dropped out of the race during the primaries and placed third or better in a state contest or earned at least one national delegate.

Legend:	1st place pledged delegates	2nd place	3rd place	Candidate has withdrawn	Candidate not on ballot

Candidates		Joe Biden	Bernie Sanders	Elizabeth Warren	Michael Bloomberg	Pete Buttigieg	Amy Klobuchar	Tulsi Gabbard	Tom Steyer	Other	Pledged delegates Total votes
Age as of 2020-11-03		77	79	71	78	38	60	39	63		
Pledged delegates: Total awarded: 3979 (Note: 2 delegates from Kentucky are uncommitted)		2,720; 68%	1,114; 28%	61; 1.68%	49; 1.23%	24; 0.6%	7; 0.176%	2; 0.05%	0; 0.0%	2; 0.05%	3,979; 100% awarded 36,922,938 votes^{[A]}
Popular votes		19,080,074; 51.7%	9,680,121; 26.2%	2,831,566; 7.7%	2,552,320; 6.9%	924,279; 2.5%	540,055; 1.5%	273,977; 0.7%	258,848; 0.7%	781,698; 2.1%	3,979; 100% awarded 36,922,938 votes^{[A]}
Feb 3	Iowa^{[B]} caucuses	14% 14 delegates 340 SDE; 23,605 votes	26% 9 delegates 562 SDE; 45,652 votes	20% 5 delegates 388 SDE; 34,909 votes	0% 0 delegates 0 SDE; 16 votes	25% 12 delegates 563 SDE; 43,209 votes	12% 1 delegate 264 SDE; 21,100 votes	0% 0 delegates 0 SDE; 16 votes	0% 0 delegates 7 SDE; 413 votes	1.9% 0 delegates 26 SDE; 3,380 votes (Note: Includes: 1.0% for Andrew Yang (1,758 votes, 21 SDE); 0.8% for Uncommitted (1,420 votes, 3 SDE); 0.1% for other candidates (198 votes, 0 SDE); <0.1% for Michael Bennet (4 votes, 0 SDE); 0.0% for Deval Patrick (0 votes, 0 SDE); 0.0% for John Delaney (withdrawn, 0 votes, 0 SDE))	41; 2,151 SDE; 172,300 votes
Feb 11	New Hampshire	8% 0 delegates 24,944 votes	26% 9 delegates 76,384 votes	9% 0 delegates 27,429 votes	2% 0 delegates 4,675 votes	24% 9 delegates 72,454 votes	20% 6 delegates 58,714 votes	3% 0 delegates 9,755 votes	4% 0 delegates 10,732 votes	4.4% 0 delegates 13,290 votes (Note: Includes: 2.8% for Andrew Yang (8,312 votes); 0.6% for write-in candidates (1,914 votes); 0.4% for Deval Patrick (1,271 votes); 0.3% for Michael Bennet (952 votes); 0.3% for other on-ballot candidates (841 votes))	24; 298,377 votes
Feb 22	Nevada^{[B]} caucuses	19% 9 delegates 2,927 CD; 19,179 votes	40% 24 delegates 6,788 CD; 41,075 votes	12% 0 delegates 1,406 CD; 11,703 votes		17% 3 delegates 2,073 CD; 17,598 votes	7% 0 delegates 603 CD; 7,376 votes	0% 0 delegates 4 CD; 32 votes	4% 0 delegates 682 CD; 4,120 votes	0.4% 0 delegates 8 CD; 460 votes (Note: Includes: 0.4% for Uncommitted (367 votes, 7 CD); <0.1% for Andrew Yang (49 votes, 1 CD); <0.1% for other on-ballot candidates (44 votes, 0 CD))	36; 14,491 CD; 101,543 votes
Feb 29	South Carolina	49% 39 delegates 262,336 votes	20% 15 delegates 106,605 votes	7% 0 delegates 38,120 votes		8% 0 delegates 44,217 votes	3% 0 delegates 16,900 votes	1% 0 delegates 6,813 votes	11% 0 delegates 61,140 votes	0.5% 0 delegates 3,132 votes (Note: Includes: 0.2% for Andrew Yang (withdrawn, 1,069 votes); 0.1% for Michael Bennet (withdrawn, 765 votes); 0.1% for Cory Booker (withdrawn, 658 votes); 0.1% for other on-ballot candidates (640 votes))	54; 539,263 votes
Mar 3	Alabama	63% 44 delegates 286,065 votes	17% 8 delegates 74,755 votes	6% 0 delegates 25,847 votes	12% 0 delegates 52,750 votes	0% 0 delegates 1,416 votes	0% 0 delegates 907 votes	0% 0 delegates 1,038 votes	0% 0 delegates 1,048 votes	1.9% 0 delegates 8,267 votes (Note: Includes: 0.8% for Uncommitted (3,700 votes); 0.5% for Michael Bennet (withdrawn, 2,250 votes); 0.2% for Andrew Yang (withdrawn, 875 votes); 0.2% for Cory Booker (withdrawn, 740 votes); 0.1% for John Delaney (withdrawn, 294 votes); 0.1% for Marianne Williamson (withdrawn, 224 votes); <0.1% for Julian Castro (withdrawn, 184 votes))	52; 452,093 votes
Mar 3	American Samoa caucus	9% 0 delegates 31 votes	11% 0 delegates 37 votes	1% 0 delegates 5 votes	50% 4 delegates 175 votes	0% 0 delegates 0 votes	0% 0 delegates 0 votes	29% 2 delegates 103 votes	0% 0 delegates 0 votes	0.0% 0 delegates 0 votes (Note: All for Uncommitted)	6; 351 votes
Mar 3	Arkansas	41% 19 delegates 93,012 votes	22% 9 delegates 51,413 votes	10% 0 delegates 22,971 votes	17% 3 delegates 38,312 votes	3% 0 delegates 7,649 votes	3% 0 delegates 7,009 votes	1% 0 delegates 1,593 votes	1% 0 delegates 2,053 votes	2.3% 0 delegates 5,110 votes (Note: Includes: 0.3% for Kamala Harris (withdrawn, 715 votes); 0.3% for Andrew Yang (withdrawn, 715 votes); 0.3% for Michael Bennet (withdrawn, 574 votes); 0.3% for Cory Booker (withdrawn, 572 votes); 0.2% for Marianne Williamson (withdrawn, 501 votes); 0.2% for Steve Bullock (withdrawn, 485 votes); 0.2% for John Delaney (withdrawn, 443 votes); 0.2% for Joe Sestak (withdrawn, 408 votes); 0.2% for 0ther candidate (393 votes); 0.1% for Julian Castro (withdrawn, 304 votes))	31; 229,122 votes
Mar 3	California	28% 172 delegates 1,613,854 votes	36% 225 delegates 2,080,846 votes	13% 11 delegates 762,555 votes	12% 7 delegates 701,803 votes	4% 0 delegates 249,256 votes	2% 0 delegates 126,961 votes	1% 0 delegates 33,769 votes	2% 0 delegates 113,092 votes	1.8% 0 delegates 102,228 votes (Note: Includes: 0.8% for Andrew Yang (withdrawn, 43,571 votes); 0.3% for other candidates and write-in votes (14,438 votes); 0.2% for Julian Castro (withdrawn, 13,892 votes); 0.1% for Michael Bennet (withdrawn, 7,377 votes); 0.1% for Marianne Williamson (withdrawn, 7,052 votes); 0.1% for Cory Booker (withdrawn, 6,000 votes); 0.1% for John Delaney (withdrawn, 4,606 votes); 0.1% for Joe Sestak (withdrawn, 3,270 votes); <0.1% for Deval Patrick (withdrawn, 2,022 votes))	415; 5,784,364 votes
Mar 3	Colorado	25% 21 delegates 236,565 votes	37% 29 delegates 355,293 votes	18% 8 delegates 168,695 votes	19% 9 delegates 177,727 votes			1% 0 delegates 10,037 votes	0% 0 delegates 3,323 votes	0.8% 0 delegates 8,488 votes (Note: Includes: 0.4% for Andrew Yang (withdrawn, 3,988 votes); 0.2% for other candidates (1,911 votes); 0.1% for Cory Booker (withdrawn, 1,276 votes); 0.1% for Marianne Williamson (withdrawn, 1,086 votes); <0.1% for Deval Patrick (withdrawn, 227 votes))	67; 960,128 votes
Mar 3	Maine	33% 13 delegates 68,729 votes	32% 9 delegates 66,826 votes	16% 2 delegates 32,055 votes	12% 0 delegates 24,294 votes	2% 0 delegates 4,364 votes	1% 0 delegates 2,826 votes	1% 0 delegates 1,815 votes	0% 0 delegates 313 votes	2.3% 0 delegates 4,725 ballots (Note: Includes: 1.7% as blank ballots (3,417 ballots); 0.3% for Andrew Yang (withdrawn, 696 votes); 0.1% for Deval Patrick (withdrawn, 218 votes); 0.1% for Marianne Williamson (withdrawn, 201 votes); 0.1% for Cory Booker (withdrawn, 183 votes))	24; 205,937 votes
Mar 3	Massachusetts	33% 45 delegates 473,861 votes	27% 30 delegates 376,990 votes	21% 16 delegates 303,864 votes	12% 0 delegates 166,200 votes	3% 0 delegates 38,400 votes	1% 0 delegates 17,297 votes	1% 0 delegates 10,548 votes	0% 0 delegates 6,762 votes	1.7% 0 delegates 24,258 ballots (Note: Includes: 0.5% for Deval Patrick (withdrawn, 6,923 votes); 0.4% for No Preference (5,345 votes); 0.3% as blank ballots (4,061 ballots); 0.2% for Andrew Yang (withdrawn, 2,708 votes); 0.1% for other candidates (1,941 votes); 0.1% for Michael Bennet (withdrawn, 1,257 votes); 0.1% for John Delaney (withdrawn, 675 votes); <0.1% for Marianne Williamson (withdrawn, 617 votes); <0.1% for Cory Booker (withdrawn, 426 votes); <0.1% for Julian Castro (withdrawn, 305 votes))	91; 1,418,180 votes
Mar 3	Minnesota	39% 43 delegates 287,553 votes	30% 27 delegates 222,431 votes	15% 5 delegates 114,674 votes	8% 0 delegates 61,882 votes	1% 0 delegates 7,616 votes	6% 0 delegates 41,530 votes	0% 0 delegates 2,504 votes	0% 0 delegates 551 votes	0.7% 0 delegates 24,258 votes (Note: Includes: 0.3% for Uncommitted (5,457 votes); 0.2% for Andrew Yang (withdrawn, 1,749 votes); 0.2% for other on-ballot candidates (1,096 votes))	75; 744,198 votes
Mar 3	North Carolina	43% 68 delegates 572,271 votes	24% 37 delegates 322,645 votes	11% 2 delegates 139,912 votes	13% 3 delegates 172,558 votes	3% 0 delegates 43,632 votes	2% 0 delegates 30,742 votes	0% 0 delegates 6,622 votes	1% 0 delegates 10,679 votes	2.6% 0 delegates 33,321 votes (Note: Includes: 1.6% for No Preference (21,808 votes); 0.2% for Andrew Yang (withdrawn, 2,973 votes); 0.2% for Cory Booker (withdrawn, 2,181 votes); 0.2% for Michael Bennet (withdrawn, 1,978 votes); 0.1% for Deval Patrick (withdrawn, 1,341 votes); 0.1% for Marianne Williamson (withdrawn, 1,243 votes); 0.1% for John Delaney (withdrawn, 1,098 votes); 0.1% for Julian Castro (withdrawn, 699 votes))	110; 1,332,382 votes
Mar 3	Oklahoma	39% 21 delegates 117,633 votes	25% 13 delegates 77,425 votes	13% 1 delegate 40,732 votes	14% 2 delegates 42,270 votes	2% 0 delegates 5,115 votes	2% 0 delegates 6,733 votes	2% 0 delegates 5,109 votes	1% 0 delegates 2,006 votes	2.4% 0 delegates 7,258 votes (Note: Includes: 0.7% for Andrew Yang (withdrawn, 1,997 votes); 0.5% for Cory Booker (withdrawn, 1,530 votes); 0.4% for Michael Bennet (withdrawn, 1,273 votes); 0.4% for Marianne Williamson (withdrawn, 1,158 votes); 0.2% for Deval Patrick (withdrawn, 680 votes); 0.2% for Julian Castro (withdrawn, 620 votes))	37; 304,281 votes
Mar 3	Tennessee	42% 36 delegates 215,390 votes	25% 22 delegates 129,168 votes	10% 1 delegate 53,732 votes	15% 5 delegates 79,789 votes	3% 0 delegates 17,102 votes	2% 0 delegates 10,671 votes	0% 0 delegates 2,278 votes	0% 0 delegates 1,932 votes	1.2% 0 delegates 6,188 votes (Note: Includes: 0.3% for Michael Bennet (withdrawn, 1,650 votes); 0.2% for Uncommitted (1,191 votes); 0.2% for Andrew Yang (withdrawn, 1,097 votes); 0.2% for Cory Booker (withdrawn, 953 votes); 0.1% for Marianne Williamson (withdrawn, 498 votes); 0.1% for John Delaney (withdrawn, 378 votes); 0.1% for Julian Castro (withdrawn, 239 votes); <0.1% for Deval Patrick (withdrawn, 182 votes))	64; 516,250 votes
Mar 3	Texas	35% 113 delegates 725,562 votes	30% 99 delegates 626,339 votes	11% 5 delegates 239,237 votes	14% 11 delegates 300,608 votes	4% 0 delegates 82,671 votes	2% 0 delegates 43,291 votes	0% 0 delegates 8,688 votes	1% 0 delegates 13,929 votes	2.6% 0 delegates 64,227 votes (Note: Includes: 0.8% for Julian Castro (withdrawn, 16,688 votes); 0.5% for Michael Bennet (withdrawn, 10,324 votes); 0.3% for other candidates (6,974 votes); 0.3% for Andrew Yang (withdrawn, 6,674 votes); 0.2% for Cory Booker (withdrawn, 4,941 votes); 0.2% for Marianne Williamson (withdrawn, 3,918 votes); 0.2% for John Delaney (withdrawn, 3,280 votes); 0.1% for Deval Patrick (withdrawn, 1,304 votes))	228; 2,094,428 votes
Mar 3	Utah	18% 7 delegates 40,674 votes	36% 16 delegates 79,728 votes	16% 3 delegates 35,727 votes	15% 3 delegates 33,991 votes	8% 0 delegates 18,734 votes	3% 0 delegates 7,603 votes	1% 0 delegates 1,704 votes	0% 0 delegates 703 votes	0.8% 0 delegates 1,718 votes (Note: Includes: 0.4% for Andrew Yang (withdrawn, 950 votes); 0.1% for Marianne Williamson (withdrawn, 220 votes); 0.1% for other candidates (196 votes); 0.1% for Julian Castro (withdrawn, 159 votes); 0.1% for Cory Booker (withdrawn, 138 votes); <0.1% for Deval Patrick (withdrawn, 55 votes))	29; 220,582 votes
Mar 3	Vermont	22% 5 delegates 34,669 votes	51% 11 delegates 79,921 votes	13% 0 delegates 19,785 votes	9% 0 delegates 14,828 votes	2% 0 delegates 3,709 votes	1% 0 delegates 1,991 votes	1% 0 delegates 1,303 votes	0% 0 delegates 202 votes	1.0% 0 delegates 1,624 ballots (Note: Includes: 0.4% for Andrew Yang (withdrawn, 591 votes); 0.2% as overvotes or blank votes (380 ballots); 0.2% for other candidates and write-in votes (329 votes); 0.1% for Deval Patrick (withdrawn, 137 votes); 0.1% for Marianne Williamson (withdrawn, 135 votes); <0.1% for Julian Castro (withdrawn, 52 votes))	16; 158,032 votes
Mar 3	Virginia	53% 67 delegates 705,501 votes	23% 31 delegates 306,388 votes	11% 1 delegate 142,546 votes	10% 0 delegates 128,030 votes	1% 0 delegates 11,199 votes	1% 0 delegates 8,414 votes	1% 0 delegates 11,288 votes	0% 0 delegates 1,472 votes	0.7% 0 delegates 8,885 votes (Note: Includes: 0.3% for Andrew Yang (withdrawn, 3,361 votes); 0.1% for Cory Booker (withdrawn, 1,910 votes); 0.1% for Michael Bennet (withdrawn, 1,437 votes); 0.1% for Marianne Williamson (withdrawn, 902 votes); 0.1% for Julian Castro (withdrawn, 691 votes); <0.1% for Deval Patrick (withdrawn, 370 votes); <0.1% for write-in candidates (184 votes))	99; 1,323,693 votes
Mar 3–10	Democrats Abroad	23% 4 delegates 9,059 votes	58% 9 delegates 23,139 votes	14% 0 delegates 5,730 votes	2% 0 delegates 892 votes	2% 0 delegates 616 votes	1% 0 delegates 224 votes	0% 0 delegates 146 votes	0% 0 delegates 19 votes	0.4% 0 delegates 159 votes (Note: Includes: 0.2% for Andrew Yang (withdrawn, 85 votes); 0.1% for Uncommitted (48 votes); 0.1% for Deval Patrick (withdrawn, 26 votes))	13; 39,984 votes
Date	State/Territory	Biden	Sanders	Warren	Bloomberg	Buttigieg	Klobuchar	Gabbard	Steyer		
Mar 10	Idaho	49% 12 delegates 53,151 votes	42% 8 delegates 46,114 votes	3% 0 delegates 2,878 votes	2% 0 delegates 2,612 votes	1% 0 delegates 1,426 votes	1% 0 delegates 774 votes	1% 0 delegates 876 votes	0% 0 delegates 112 votes	0.9% 0 delegates 706 votes (Note: Includes: 0.3% for Andrew Yang (withdrawn, 310 votes); 0.1% for Michael Bennet (withdrawn, 91 votes); 0.1% for John Delaney (withdrawn, 65 votes); 0.1% for other candidates (60 votes); 0.1% for Marianne Williamson (withdrawn, 57 votes); 0.1% for Cory Booker (withdrawn, 55 votes); 0.1% for Julian Castro (withdrawn, 49 votes); <0.1% for Deval Patrick (withdrawn, 19 votes))	20; 108,649 votes
Mar 10	Michigan	53% 73 delegates 840,360 votes	36% 52 delegates 576,926 votes	2% 0 delegates 26,148 votes	5% 0 delegates 73,464 votes	1% 0 delegates 22,462 votes	1% 0 delegates 11,018 votes	1% 0 delegates 9,461 votes	0% 0 delegates 1,732 votes	1.8% 0 delegates 26,110 votes (Note: Includes: 1.2% for Uncommitted (19,106 votes); 0.2% for Andrew Yang (withdrawn, 2,380 votes); 0.1% for Michael Bennet (withdrawn, 1,536 votes); 0.1% for Cory Booker (withdrawn, 840 votes); 0.1% for Joe Sestak (withdrawn, 757 votes); 0.1% for Marianne Williamson (withdrawn, 719 votes); <0.1% for John Delaney (withdrawn, 464 votes); <0.1% for Julian Castro (withdrawn, 306 votes))	125; 1,587,679 votes
Mar 10	Mississippi	81% 34 delegates 222,160 votes	15% 2 delegates 40,657 votes	1% 0 delegates 1,550 votes	3% 0 delegates 6,933 votes	0% 0 delegates 562 votes	0% 0 delegates 440 votes	0% 0 delegates 1,003 votes	0% 0 delegates 378 votes	0.3% 0 delegates 708 votes (Note: Includes: 0.2% for Andrew Yang (withdrawn, 450 votes); 0.1% for Deval Patrick (withdrawn, 258 votes))	36; 274,391 votes
Mar 10	Missouri	60% 44 delegates 400,347 votes	35% 24 delegates 230,374 votes	1% 0 delegates 8,156 votes	1% 0 delegates 9,866 votes	0% 0 delegates 3,309 votes	0% 0 delegates 2,682 votes	1% 0 delegates 4,887 votes	0% 0 delegates 584 votes	0.9% 0 delegates 5,907 votes (Note: Includes: 0.4% for Uncommitted (2,494 votes); 0.3% for other candidates (1,809 votes); 0.1% for Andrew Yang (withdrawn, 953 votes); 0.1% for Cory Booker (withdrawn, 651 votes))	68; 666,112 votes
Mar 10	North Dakota firehouse caucuses	39% 6 delegates 5,742 votes	53% 8 delegates 7,682 votes	3% 0 delegates 366 votes	1% 0 delegates 113 votes	1% 0 delegates 164 votes	2% 0 delegates 223 votes	1% 0 delegates 89 votes	0% 0 delegates 6 votes	1.0% 0 delegates 161 ballots (Note: Includes: 0.9% as unsigned votes, overvotes and blank votes (133 ballots); 0.1% for Andrew Yang (withdrawn, 20 votes); <0.1% for Michael Bennet (withdrawn, 3 votes); <0.1% for John Delaney (withdrawn, 3 votes); <0.1% for Deval Patrick (withdrawn, 2 votes))	14; 14,546 votes
Mar 10	Washington	38% 46 delegates 591,403 votes	37% 43 delegates 570,039 votes	9% 0 delegates 142,652 votes	8% 0 delegates 122,530 votes	4% 0 delegates 63,344 votes	2% 0 delegates 33,383 votes	1% 0 delegates 13,199 votes	0% 0 delegates 3,455 votes	1.1% 0 delegates 18,771 votes (Note: Includes: 0.4% for Uncommitted (6,450 votes); 0.4% for Andrew Yang (withdrawn, 6,403 votes); 0.1% for Michael Bennet (withdrawn, 2,044 votes); 0.1% for write-in candidates (withdrawn, 1,479 votes); 0.1% for Cory Booker (withdrawn, 1,314 votes); <0.1% for John Delaney (withdrawn, 573 votes); <0.1% for Deval Patrick (withdrawn, 508 votes))	89; 1,558,776 votes
Mar 14	Northern Marianas caucus	36% 2 delegates 48 votes	63% 4 delegates 84 votes							1% 0 delegates 2 votes	6; 134 votes
Mar 17	Arizona	44% 38 delegates 268,029 votes	33% 29 delegates 200,456 votes	6% 0 delegates 35,537 votes	10% 0 delegates 58,797 votes	4% 0 delegates 24,868 votes	2% 0 delegates 10,333 votes	0% 0 delegates 3,014 votes	0% 0 delegates 1,381 votes	1.7% 0 delegates 10,939 ballots (Note: Includes: 0.8% as other votes (4,942 ballots); 0.3% for Andrew Yang (withdrawn, 1,921 votes); 0.1% for other candidates (812 votes); 0.1% for Julian Castro (withdrawn, 754 votes); 0.1% for Marianne Williamson (withdrawn, 668 votes); 0.1% for John Delaney (withdrawn, 505 votes); 0.1% for Cory Booker (withdrawn, 494 votes); 0.1% for Michael Bennet (withdrawn, 394 votes); <0.1% for Deval Patrick (withdrawn, 242 votes); <0.1% for Henry Hewes (208 votes))	67; 613,355 votes
Mar 17	Florida	62% 162 delegates 1,077,375 votes	23% 57 delegates 397,311 votes	2% 0 delegates 32,875 votes	8% 0 delegates 146,544 votes	2% 0 delegates 39,886 votes	1% 0 delegates 17,276 votes	1% 0 delegates 8,712 votes	0% 0 delegates 2,510 votes	0.8% 0 delegates 16,725 votes (Note: Includes: 0.3% for Andrew Yang (withdrawn, 5,286 votes); 0.2% for Michael Bennet (withdrawn, 4,244 votes); 0.1% for Marianne Williamson (withdrawn, 1,744 votes); 0.1% for John Delaney (withdrawn, 1,583 votes); 0.1% for Cory Booker (withdrawn, 1,507 votes); <0.1% for Joe Sestak (withdrawn, 664 votes); <0.1% for Deval Patrick (withdrawn, 661 votes))	219; 1,739,214 votes
Mar 17	Illinois	59% 95 delegates 986,661 votes	36% 60 delegates 605,701 votes	1% 0 delegates 24,413 votes	2% 0 delegates 25,500 votes	1% 0 delegates 9,729 votes		1% 0 delegates 9,642 votes	0% 0 delegates 1,684 votes	0.7% 0 delegates 10,803 votes (Note: Includes: 0.2% for Andrew Yang (withdrawn, 4,021 votes); 0.2% for Cory Booker (withdrawn, 2,684 votes); 0.1% for Deval Patrick (withdrawn, 1,567 votes); 0.1% for Michael Bennet (withdrawn, 1,346 votes); 0.1% for John Delaney (withdrawn, 1,185 votes))	155; 1,674,133 votes
Date	State/Territory	Biden	Sanders	Warren	Bloomberg	Buttigieg	Klobuchar	Gabbard	Steyer		
Apr 7	Wisconsin	63% 56 delegates 581,463 votes	32% 28 delegates 293,441 votes	2% 0 delegates 14,060 votes	1% 0 delegates 8,846 votes	1% 0 delegates 4,946 votes	1% 0 delegates 6,079 votes	1% 0 delegates 5,565 votes	0% 0 delegates 836 votes	0.7% 0 delegates 10,803 votes (Note: Includes: 0.4% for Uninstructed Delegate (3,590 votes); 0.4% for Andrew Yang (withdrawn, 3,349 votes); 0.2% for write-in candidates (1,575 votes); 0.1% for John Delaney (withdrawn, 529 votes); 0.1% for Michael Bennet (withdrawn, 475 votes); <0.1% for Deval Patrick (withdrawn, 1,567 votes))	84; 925,065 votes
Apr 10	Alaska^{[B]}	55% 8 delegates 10,834 votes	44% 7 delegates 8,755 votes	0 delegates Eliminated	0 delegates Eliminated	0 delegates Eliminated	0 delegates Eliminated	0 delegates Eliminated	0 delegates Eliminated	0.9% 0 delegates 170 votes (Note: All inactive votes)	15; 19,759 votes
Apr 17	Wyoming^{[B]} caucus-by-mail	71% 10 delegates 235 SCD; 10,912 votes	27% 4 delegates 88 SCD; 4,206 votes	0 delegates 0 SCD; Eliminated	0 delegates 0 SCD; Eliminated	0 delegates 0 SCD; Eliminated	0 delegates 0 SCD; Eliminated	0 delegates 0 SCD; Eliminated	0 delegates 0 SCD; Eliminated	1.8% 0 delegates 273 votes	14; 323 SCD; 15,391 votes
Apr 28	Ohio	72% 115 delegates 647,284 votes	17% 21 delegates 149,683 votes	3% 0 delegates 30,985 votes	3% 0 delegates 28,704 votes	2% 0 delegates 15,113 votes	1% 0 delegates 11,899 votes	1% 0 delegates 4,560 votes	0% 0 delegates 2,801 votes	0.4% 0 delegates 3,354 votes (Note: Includes: 0.2% for Michael Bennet (withdrawn, 2,030 votes); 0.1% for Deval Patrick (withdrawn, 822 votes); 0.1% for Andrew Yang (withdrawn, 502 votes))	136; 894,383 votes
Date	State/Territory	Biden	Sanders	Warren	Bloomberg	Buttigieg	Klobuchar	Gabbard	Steyer		
May 2	Kansas	75% 29 delegates 110,041 votes	23% 10 delegates 33,142 votes	0 delegates Eliminated				0 delegates Eliminated		2.5% 0 delegates 3,690 votes	39; 146,873 votes
May 12	Nebraska	77% 29 delegates 126,444 votes	14% 0 delegates 23,214 votes	6% 0 delegates 10,401 votes				3% 0 delegates 4,523 votes			29; 164,582 votes
May 19	Oregon	66% 46 delegates 408,315 votes	21% 15 delegates 127,345 votes	10% 0 delegates 59,355 votes				2% 0 delegates 10,717 votes		2.1% 0 delegates 12,979 votes (Note: All for write-in candidates)	61; 618,711 votes
May 22	Hawaii^{[B]}	61% 16 delegates 21,215 votes	35% 8 delegates 12,337 votes	0 delegates Eliminated	0 delegates Eliminated	0 delegates Eliminated	0 delegates Eliminated	0 delegates Eliminated	0 delegates Eliminated	4.3% 0 delegates 1,492 votes (Note: Includes: 4.1% as inactive votes (1,424 votes); 0.2% as void votes (68 votes))	24; 35,044 votes
Date	State/Territory	Biden	Sanders	Warren	Bloomberg	Buttigieg	Klobuchar	Gabbard	Steyer		
Jun 2	District of Columbia	76% 19 delegates 84,093 votes	10% 0 delegates 11,116 votes	13% 1 delegate 14,228 votes				0% 0 delegates 442 votes		0.7% 0 delegates 809 votes	20; 110,688 votes
Jun 2	Indiana	76% 80 delegates 380,836 votes	14% 2 delegate 67,688 votes	3% 0 delegates 14,344 votes	1% 0 delegates 4,783 votes	4% 0 delegates 17,957 votes	1% 0 delegates 3,860 votes	1% 0 delegates 2,657 votes	0% 0 delegates 1,376 votes	0.9% 0 delegates 4,426 votes (Note: All for Andrew Yang)	82; 497,927 votes
Jun 2	Maryland	84% 96 delegates 879,753 votes	8% 0 delegates 81,939 votes	3% 0 delegates 27,134 votes	1% 0 delegates 6,773 votes	1% 0 delegates 7,180 votes	1% 0 delegates 5,685 votes	0% 0 delegates 4,226 votes	0% 0 delegates 671 votes	3.6% 0 delegates 37,412 votes (Note: Includes: 2.3% for Uninstructed Delegate (23,726 votes); 0.6% for Andrew Yang (withdrawn, 6,670 votes); 0.3% for Cory Booker (withdrawn, 2,662 votes); 0.2% for Michael Bennet (withdrawn, 2,291 votes); 0.1% for Marianne Williamson (withdrawn, 897 votes); 0.1% for Julian Castro (withdrawn, 760 votes); <0.1% for Deval Patrick (withdrawn, 406 votes))	96; 1,050,773 votes
Jun 2	Montana	74% 18 delegates 111,706 votes	15% 1 delegate 22,033 votes	8% 0 delegates 11,984 votes						2.8% 0 delegates 4,250 votes (Note: All for No Preference)	19; 149,973 votes
Jun 2	New Mexico	73% 30 delegates 181,700 votes	15% 4 delegates 37,435 votes	6% 0 delegates 14,552 votes				1% 0 delegates 2,735 votes		4.6% 0 delegates 11,458 votes (Note: Includes: 2.6% for Uncommitted Delegate (6,461 votes); 1.6% for Andrew Yang (withdrawn, 4,026 votes); 0.4% for Deval Patrick (withdrawn, 971 votes))	34; 247,880 votes
Jun 2	Pennsylvania	79% 151 delegates 1,264,624 votes	18% 35 delegates 287,834 votes					3% 0 delegates 43,050 votes			186; 1,595,508 votes
Jun 2	Rhode Island	77% 25 delegates 79,728 votes	15% 1 delegates 15,525 votes	4% 0 delegates 4,479 votes				1% 0 delegates 651 votes		3.5% 0 delegates 3,599 votes (Note: Includes: 1.8% for Uncommitted (1,861 votes); 0.9% for write-in candidates (936 votes); 0.8% for Andrew Yang (withdrawn, 802 votes))	26; 103,982 votes
Jun 2	South Dakota	77% 13 delegates 40,800 votes	23% 3 delegates 11,861 votes								16; 52,661 votes
Jun 6	Guam caucuses	70% 5 delegates 270 votes	30% 2 delegates 118 votes								7; 388 votes
Jun 6	US Virgin Islands caucuses	91% 7 delegates 502 votes	5% 0 delegates 28 votes							3.6% 0 delegates 20 votes	7; 550 votes
Jun 9	Georgia	85% 105 delegates 922,177 votes	9% 0 delegates 101,668 votes	2% 0 delegates 21,906 votes	1% 0 delegates 7,657 votes	1% 0 delegates 6,346 votes	0% 0 delegates 4,317 votes	0% 0 delegates 4,117 votes	0% 0 delegates 1,752 votes	1.5% 0 delegates 16,789 votes (Note: Includes: 0.8% for Andrew Yang (withdrawn, 9,117 votes); 0.5% for Michael Bennet (withdrawn, 5,154 votes); 0.1% for John Delaney (withdrawn, 1,476 votes); 0.1% for Deval Patrick (withdrawn, 1,042 votes))	105; 1,086,729 votes
Jun 9	West Virginia	65% 28 delegates 122,518 votes	12% 0 delegates 22,793 votes	3% 0 delegates 5,741 votes	2% 0 delegates 3,759 votes	2% 0 delegates 3,455 votes	2% 0 delegates 3,011 votes	2% 0 delegates 4,163 votes	1% 0 delegates 1,235 votes	11.2% 0 delegates 22,042 votes (Note: Includes: 8.3% for David Lee Rice (15,470 votes); 1.4% for Andrew Yang (withdrawn, 2,590 votes); 1.0% for Michael Bennet (withdrawn, 1,865 votes); 0.5% for Deval Patrick (withdrawn, 882 votes))	28; 187,482 votes
Jun 23	Kentucky	68% 52 delegates 365,284 votes	12% 0 delegates 65,055 votes	3% 0 delegates 15,300 votes		2% 0 delegates 9,127 votes	1% 0 delegates 5,296 votes	1% 0 delegates 5,859 votes	0% 0 delegates 2,656 votes	13% 2 delegates 69,328 votes (Note: Includes: 10.9% for Uncommitted (58,364 votes, 2 delegates); 1.4% for Andrew Yang (withdrawn, 7,267 votes); 0.5% for Michael Bennet (withdrawn, 2,514 votes); 0.2% for Deval Patrick (withdrawn, 1,183 votes))	54; 537,905 votes
Jun 23	New York	65% 230 delegates 1,136,679 votes	16% 44 delegates 285,908 votes	5% 0 delegates 82,917 votes	2% 0 delegates 39,433 votes	1% 0 delegates 22,927 votes	1% 0 delegates 11,028 votes	1% 0 delegates 9,083 votes	0% 0 delegates 2,299 votes	13% 0 delegates 168,765 ballots (Note: Includes: 7.7% as blank ballots (135,486 ballots); 1.3% for Andrew Yang (withdrawn, 22,686 votes); 0.2% as void ballots (4,621 ballots); 0.2% for Deval Patrick (withdrawn, 3,040 votes); 0.2% for Michael Bennet (withdrawn, 2,932 votes))	274; 1,759,039 votes
Date	State/Territory	Biden	Sanders	Warren	Bloomberg	Buttigieg	Klobuchar	Gabbard	Steyer		
Jul 7	Delaware	89% 21 delegates 81,954 votes	8% 0 delegates 6,878 votes	3% 0 delegates 2,850 votes							21; 91,682 votes
Jul 7	New Jersey	85% 121 delegates 813,693 votes	15% 5 delegates 140,336 votes							0.4% 0 delegates 4,162 votes	126; 958,202 votes
Jul 11	Louisiana	80% 54 delegates 212,555 votes	7% 0 delegates 19,859 votes	2% 0 delegates 6,426 votes	2% 0 delegates 4,312 votes	1% 0 delegates 2,363 votes	1% 0 delegates 2,431 votes	1% 0 delegates 1,962 votes	0% 0 delegates 902 votes	3.8% 0 delegates 10,303 votes (Note: Includes: 1.7% for Andrew Yang (withdrawn, 4,617 votes); 1.1% for other candidates (2,932 votes); 0.7% for John Delaney (withdrawn, 1,877 votes); 0.3% for Deval Patrick (withdrawn, 877 votes))	54; 267,286 votes
Jul 12	Puerto Rico	56% 44 delegates 3,930 votes	13% 5 delegates 932 votes	1% 0 delegates 101 votes	13% 2 delegates 894 votes	2% 0 delegates 158 votes	0% 0 delegates 31 votes	3% 0 delegates 194 votes	1% 0 delegates 62 votes	10.3% 0 delegates 720 votes (Note: All as undervotes, overvotes or blank ballots)	51; 7,022 votes
Aug 11	Connecticut	85% 60 delegates 221,323 votes	12% 0 delegates 30,062 votes					1% 0 delegates 3,398 votes		2.3% 0 delegates 5,975 votes	60; 260,750 votes
Withdrawal date			Apr 8, 2020	Mar 5, 2020	Mar 4, 2020	Mar 1, 2020	Mar 2, 2020	Mar 19, 2020	Feb 29, 2020		

^{A} Total votes, incl. No Preference, Uncommitted, and various write-ins and minor candidates.
^{B} Results from the final alignment / the last round.

== Other candidates ==
Eighteen candidates suspended their campaigns before the Iowa caucuses. Seven major candidates had withdrawn from the race after states began to certify candidates for ballot spots: Joe Sestak, Steve Bullock, Kamala Harris, Julián Castro, Marianne Williamson, Cory Booker, and John Delaney. Three others dropped out after the New Hampshire primary. Since the beginning of the primary season, none of these other candidates have been awarded any delegates.

Candidates		Deval Patrick	Andrew Yang	Michael Bennet	John Delaney	Cory Booker	Marianne Williamson	Julian Castro	Kamala Harris	Steve Bullock	Joe Sestak
Withdrawal date		February 12, 2020	February 11, 2020	February 11, 2020	January 31, 2020	January 13, 2020	January 10, 2020	January 2, 2020	December 3, 2019	December 2, 2019	December 2, 2019
Date	State/ Territory										framelesscenter
Feb 3	IA		1,758	4							
Feb 11	NH	1,271	8,312	952	83	157	99	83	129	64	152
Feb 22	NV	8	49	36							
Feb 29	SC	288	1,069	765	352	658					
Mar 3	AL		875	2,250	294	740	224	184			
Mar 3	AR		715	574	443	572	501	304	715	485	408
Mar 3	CA	2,022	43,571	7,377	4,606	6,000	7,052	13,892			3,270
Mar 3	CO	227	3,988			1,276	1,086				
Mar 3	DA	26	85								
Mar 3	ME	218	696			183	201				
Mar 3	MA	6,918	2,713	1,284	718	426	616	304			
Mar 3	MN	72	1,749	315	172	197	226	114			
Mar 3	NC	1,341	2,973	1,978	1,098	2,181	1,243	699			
Mar 3	OK	680	1,997	1,273		1,530	1,158	620			
Mar 3	TN	182	1,097	1,650	378	953	498	239			
Mar 3	TX	1,304	6,674	10,324	3,280	4,941	3,918	16,688			
Mar 3	UT	55	950	0		138	220	159			
Mar 3	VT	137	591				135	52			
Mar 3	VA	370	3,361	1,437		1,910	902	691			
Mar 10	ID	19	310	92	65	55	57	49			
Mar 10	MI		2,380	1,536	464	840	719	306			757
Mar 10	MS	258	450			0					
Mar 10	MO	52	953	206	159	651	170	103			
Mar 10	ND	2	20	3	3	0					
Mar 10	WA	508	6,403	2,044	573	1,314					
Mar 17	AZ	242	1,921				668	754			
Mar 17	FL	661	5,286	4,244	1,583	1,507	1,744	1,036			664
Mar 17	IL	1,567	4,021	1,346	1,185	2,684					
Apr 7	WI	311	3,349	475	529						
Apr 28	OH	822	502	2,030							
June 2	IN		4,255								
June 2	MD	406	6,670	2,291		2,662	897	760			
June 2	NM	969	3,850								
June 9	GA	1,042	9,117	5,154	1,476						
June 9	WV	859	2,489	1,818							
June 23	NY	3,040	22,686	2,932							
June 23	KY	1,183	7,267	2,514							
July 11	LA	877	4,617	6,173	1,877						
TOTAL		27,116	160,733	62,260	19,342	31,575	22,334	37,037	844	549	5,251

Other candidates were able to make it on the ballot in individual states. Some votes for minor candidates are unavailable because in many states (territories) they can be listed as Others or Write-ins. Since the beginning of the primary season, none of these other candidates have been awarded any delegates. Of the over 200 people who have filed with the FEC as candidates for the Democratic nomination, the following have been placed on the ballot in at least one state.

National popular vote totals for other candidates
Candidate	Votes	No. states on ballot
Uncommitted†	35,970	Various states
Other‡	18,115	Various states
David Lee Rice	15,023	1 (WV)
Roque De La Fuente III	13,610	6 (NH, UT, CA, AZ, CO, TX)
Michael A. Ellinger	3,627	3 (NH, AZ, CA)
Robby Wells	3,340	5 (NH, TX, MO, LA, CO)
Mark Stewart Greenstein	3,331	3 (NH, VT, CA)
Mosie Boyd	2,064	4 (NH, UT, AR, CA)
Steve Burke	1,774	3 (NH, LA, MO)
Rita Krichevsky	468	2 (NH, CO)
Bill Haas	392	1 (MO)
Henry Hewes	345	3 (NH, AZ, MO)
Velma Steinman	191	1 (MO)
Leonard J. Steinman II	175	1 (MO)
Tom Koos	72	1 (NH)
Nathan Bloxham	69	1 (UT)
David John Thistle	53	1 (NH)
Sam Sloan	34	1 (NH)
Lorenz Kraus	52	1 (NH)
Thomas James Torgesen	30	1 (NH)
Jason Evritte Dunlap	12	1 (NH)
Ben Gleib	31	1 (NH)
Raymond Michael Moroz	8	1 (NH)

†Sometimes listed as "None of the Above"

‡Some states don't count some write-ins or minor candidates individually but lump them together.

== Results ==
=== Early states ===
==== Iowa ====
The Iowa Democratic caucuses took place on February 3, 2020. The results of the 2020 Iowa caucuses had been challenged by Bernie Sanders before the Democratic National Committee's Rules and Bylaws Committee following certification, as of February 29, 2020. However, no news reports about the outcome of that challenge had occurred afterwards.

Final alignment popular vote share by county
Buttigieg—<30%
Buttigieg—30–40%
Buttigieg—40–50%
Sanders—<30%
Sanders—30–40%
Sanders—50–60%
Warren—<30%
Warren—30–40%
Biden—<30%
Biden—30–40%
Klobuchar—<30%
Klobuchar—30–40%

Final alignment popular vote share by congressional district
Buttigieg—<30%
Sanders—<30%

2020 Iowa Democratic presidential caucuses
Candidate	Initial alignment		Final alignment (Note: Final vote after votes for candidates below the 15% viability threshold in each precinct are reallocated to other viable candidates.)		State delegate equivalents (Note: The official results included four decimal digits.)		Pledged national convention delegates (Note: In Iowa, the presidential caucuses only are the first determining step for the delegate distribution, the final step are the decisions on the district conventions and the much later state convention. According to the provisions set by the Iowa Democratic Party's "Delegate Selection Plan", statewide delegates preliminarily awarded to other candidates had to be reallocated at the state convention on June 13, as their pledged candidates had dropped out, while the already early decided district delegates remain fixed.)
Candidate	Votes	%	Votes	%	Number	%	Pledged national convention delegates
Pete Buttigieg	37,572	21.31	43,209	25.08	562.95	26.17	(Note: Due to his withdrawal in March, 2 of the 5 statewide delegates mathematically won by Buttigieg were reallocated to Biden at the state convention on June 13.)14
Bernie Sanders	43,581	24.71	45,652	26.50	562.02	26.13	(Note: Due to his withdrawal in April, 3 of the 4 statewide delegates mathematically won by Sanders were reallocated to Biden at the state convention on June 13.)12
Elizabeth Warren	32,589	18.48	34,909	20.26	388.44	18.06	(Note: Due to her withdrawal in March, all of the 3 statewide delegates mathematically won by Warren were reallocated to Biden at the state convention on June 13.)8
Joe Biden	26,291	14.91	23,605	13.70	340.32	15.82	(Note: 8 of the 12 statewide delegates initially awarded to Buttigieg (2), Sanders (3) and Warren (3), who had withdrawn in the meantime, were reallocated to Biden as the sole remaining viable contender and were added to his own 2 statewide delegates at the state convention on June 13.)6
Amy Klobuchar	22,454	12.73	21,100	12.25	263.87	12.27	1
Andrew Yang	8,914	5.05	1,758	1.02	21.86	1.02	
Tom Steyer	3,061	1.74	413	0.24	6.62	0.31	
Michael Bloomberg (did not run yet) (Note: Michael Bloomberg officially announced his candidacy for the Democratic nomination on November 24, 2019, but chose not to contest the first four nominating contests of the primary season, including the Iowa caucuses.)	212	0.12	16	0.01	0.21	0.01	
Tulsi Gabbard	341	0.19	16	0.01	0.11	0.01	
Michael Bennet	164	0.09	4	0.00	0.00	0.00	
Deval Patrick	9	0.01	0	0.00	0.00	0.00	
John Delaney (withdrawn)	0	0.00	0	0.00	0.00	0.00	
Other	155	0.09	198	0.11	0.69	0.03	
Uncommitted	1,009	0.57	1,420	0.82	3.73	0.17	
Total (Note: Per the Iowa Democratic Party official report.)	176,352	100%	172,300	100%	2,150.83	100%	41

==== New Hampshire ====
The New Hampshire Democratic primary took place on February 11, 2020.

Popular vote share by county
Sanders—<30%
Sanders—30–40%
Buttigieg—<30%

Popular vote share by congressional district
Sanders—25–30%

2020 New Hampshire Democratic presidential primary
Candidate	Votes	%	Delegates
Bernie Sanders	76,384	25.60	9
Pete Buttigieg	72,454	24.28	9
Amy Klobuchar	58,714	19.68	6
Elizabeth Warren	27,429	9.19	
Joe Biden	24,944	8.36	
Tom Steyer	10,732	3.60	
Tulsi Gabbard	9,755	3.27	
Andrew Yang	8,312	2.79	
Michael Bloomberg (write-in)	4,675	1.57	
Deval Patrick	1,271	0.43	
Michael Bennet	952	0.32	
Cory Booker (withdrawn)	157	0.05	
Joe Sestak (withdrawn)	152	0.05	
Kamala Harris (withdrawn)	129	0.04	
Marianne Williamson (withdrawn)	99	0.03	
Julian Castro (withdrawn)	83	0.03	
John Delaney (withdrawn)	83	0.03	
Steve Bullock (withdrawn)	64	0.02	
Henry Hewes	43	0.01	
Ben Gleib (withdrawn)	31	0.01	
Other candidates / Write-in	(Note: Including 157 write-in votes)665	0.22	
Donald Trump (write-in Republican)	1,217	0.41	
Bill Weld (write-in Republican)	17	0.01	
Mitt Romney (write-in Republican)	10	0.00	
Other write-in Republicans	5	0.00	
Total	298,377	100%	24

==== Nevada ====
The Nevada Democratic caucus took place with early voting February 14 to 18, and was completed on February 22, 2020.

Final alignment popular vote share by county
Sanders—30–40%
Sanders—40–50%
Sanders—60–70%
Sanders—70–80%
Buttigieg—<30%
Buttigieg—30–40%
Buttigieg—40–50%

County convention delegates won by county
Sanders—30–40%
Sanders—40–50%
Sanders—50–60%
Sanders—70–80%
Buttigieg—<30%
Buttigieg—30–40%
Buttigieg—40–50%
Steyer—<30%

Final alignment popular vote share by congressional district
Sanders—30–40%
Sanders—40–50%

2020 Nevada Democratic presidential caucuses
Candidate	First alignment		Final alignment (Note: Vote count after votes for candidates who did not get at least 15% of the vote in that precinct are reallocated to the voter's second choice.)		County convention delegates (Note: County convention delegates (CCDs) are used to calculate how many pledged national convention delegates each candidate wins statewide and in the state's four congressional districts.)		Pledged national convention delegates (Note: The number of pledged national convention delegates is determined by the number of CCDs won. However, a candidate must get both at least 15% of the total vote to get statewide delegates, and at least 15% of the vote in a congressional district to get delegates from that district. Each precinct has a certain number of CCDs and allocates them based on how many caucus goers there are for each candidate at that precinct.)
Candidate	Votes	%	Votes	%	Number	%	Pledged national convention delegates
Bernie Sanders	35,652	33.99	41,075	40.45	6,788	46.84	24
Joe Biden	18,424	17.57	19,179	18.89	2,927	20.20	9
Pete Buttigieg	16,102	15.35	17,598	17.33	2,073	14.31	3
Elizabeth Warren	13,438	12.81	11,703	11.53	1,406	9.70	
Tom Steyer	9,503	9.06	4,120	4.06	682	4.71	
Amy Klobuchar	10,100	9.63	7,376	7.26	603	4.16	
Tulsi Gabbard	353	0.34	32	0.03	4	0.03	
Andrew Yang (withdrawn)	612	0.58	49	0.05	1	0.01	
Michael Bennet (withdrawn)	140	0.13	36	0.04	0	0.00	
Deval Patrick (withdrawn)	86	0.08	8	0.01	0	0.00	
John Delaney (withdrawn; not on the ballot)	1	0.00	0	0.00	0	0.00	
Uncommitted	472	0.45	367	0.36	7	0.05	
Total	104,883	100%	101,543	100%	14,491	100%	36

==== South Carolina ====
The South Carolina Democratic primary took place on February 29, 2020, three days prior to Super Tuesday.

Popular vote share by county
Biden—30–40%
Biden—40–50%
Biden—50–60%
Biden—60–70%
Biden—70–80%

Popular vote share by congressional district
Biden—30–40%
Biden—40–50%
Biden—50–60%
Biden—60–70%

Official results show that Joe Biden won the Democratic primary with 48.65% of the vote, with Bernie Sanders coming in second with 19.77%.

2020 South Carolina Democratic presidential primary
Candidate	Votes	%	Delegates
Joe Biden	262,336	48.65	39
Bernie Sanders	106,605	19.77	15
Tom Steyer	61,140	11.34	
Pete Buttigieg	44,217	8.20	
Elizabeth Warren	38,120	7.07	
Amy Klobuchar	16,900	3.13	
Tulsi Gabbard	6,813	1.26	
Andrew Yang (withdrawn)	1,069	0.20	
Michael Bennet (withdrawn)	765	0.14	
Cory Booker (withdrawn)	658	0.12	
John Delaney (withdrawn)	352	0.07	
Deval Patrick (withdrawn)	288	0.05	
Total	539,263	100%	54

=== Super Tuesday ===
Super Tuesday took place on March 3, 2020. A total of 14 states and American Samoa voted on Super Tuesday, including the two biggest states, California and Texas. Biden gained 726 delegates, Sanders 505, Bloomberg 49, Warren 62, and Tulsi Gabbard 2.

==== Alabama ====
Popular vote share by county Biden—40–50% Biden—50–60% Biden—60–70% Biden—70–80%

2020 Alabama Democratic presidential primary
Candidate	Votes	%	Delegates
Joe Biden	286,065	63.28	44
Bernie Sanders	74,755	16.54	8
Michael Bloomberg	52,750	11.67	
Elizabeth Warren	25,847	5.72	
Michael Bennet (withdrawn) (Note: Candidate withdrew after the New Hampshire primary when absentee voting had already begun.)	2,250	0.50	
Pete Buttigieg (withdrawn) (Note: Candidate withdrew shortly before the primary when absentee voting had already begun.)	1,416	0.31	
Tom Steyer (withdrawn)	1,048	0.23	
Tulsi Gabbard	1,038	0.23	
Amy Klobuchar (withdrawn)	907	0.20	
Andrew Yang (withdrawn)	875	0.19	
Cory Booker (withdrawn) (Note: Candidate withdrew during the first days of the absentee voting period.)	740	0.16	
John Delaney (withdrawn)	294	0.07	
Marianne Williamson (withdrawn)	224	0.05	
Julian Castro (withdrawn)	184	0.04	
Uncommitted	3,700	0.82	
Total	452,093	100%	52

==== American Samoa ====
2020 American Samoa Democratic presidential caucus
Candidate	Votes	%	Delegates
Michael Bloomberg	175	49.86	4
Tulsi Gabbard	103	29.34	2
Bernie Sanders	37	10.54	
Joe Biden	31	8.83	
Elizabeth Warren	5	1.42	
Uncommitted	0	0.00	
Total	351	100%	6

==== Arkansas ====
Popular vote share by county Biden—30–40% Biden—40–50% Biden—50–60% Biden—60–70% Sanders—30–40%

2020 Arkansas Democratic presidential primary
Candidate	Votes	%	Delegates
Joe Biden	93,012	40.59	17
Bernie Sanders	51,413	22.44	9
Michael Bloomberg	38,312	16.72	5
Elizabeth Warren	22,971	10.03	
Pete Buttigieg (withdrawn) (Note: Candidate withdrew after early voting had started.)	7,649	3.34	
Amy Klobuchar (withdrawn)	7,009	3.06	
Tom Steyer (withdrawn)	2,053	0.90	
Tulsi Gabbard	1,593	0.70	
Kamala Harris (withdrawn)	715	0.31	
Andrew Yang (withdrawn)	715	0.31	
Michael Bennet (withdrawn)	574	0.25	
Cory Booker (withdrawn)	572	0.25	
Marianne Williamson (withdrawn)	501	0.22	
Steve Bullock (withdrawn)	485	0.21	
John Delaney (withdrawn)	443	0.19	
Joe Sestak (withdrawn)	408	0.18	
Julian Castro (withdrawn)	304	0.13	
Other candidate	393	0.17	
Total	229,122	100%	31

==== California ====
2020 California Democratic presidential primary
Candidate	Votes	%	Delegates
Bernie Sanders	2,080,846	35.97	225
Joe Biden	1,613,854	27.90	172
Elizabeth Warren	762,555	13.18	11
Michael Bloomberg	701,803	12.13	7
Pete Buttigieg (withdrawn) (Note: Candidate withdrew shortly before the primary, when all-mail voting had already begun.)	249,256	4.31	
Amy Klobuchar (withdrawn)	126,961	2.19	
Tom Steyer (withdrawn)	113,092	1.96	
Andrew Yang (withdrawn) (Note: Candidate withdrew following the New Hampshire primary, when all-mail voting had already begun.)	43,571	0.75	
Tulsi Gabbard	33,769	0.58	
Julian Castro (withdrawn)	13,892	0.24	
Michael Bennet (withdrawn)	7,377	0.13	
Marianne Williamson (withdrawn)	7,052	0.12	
Cory Booker (withdrawn)	6,000	0.10	
John Delaney (withdrawn)	4,606	0.08	
Joe Sestak (withdrawn)	3,270	0.06	
Deval Patrick (withdrawn)	2,022	0.03	
Other candidates / Write-in	(Note: Including 34 write-in votes)14,438	0.25	
Total	5,784,364	100%	415

==== Colorado ====
The results were certified on March 30. The race was called for Bernie Sanders who won a plurality of votes and delegates.

2020 Colorado Democratic presidential primary
Candidate	Votes	%	Delegates
Bernie Sanders	355,293	37.00	29 (Note: 24 delegates, if Bloomberg's and Warren's statewide delegates would have been calculated.)
Joe Biden	236,565	24.64	21 (Note: 17 delegates, if Bloomberg's and Warren's statewide delegates would have been calculated.)
Michael Bloomberg	177,727	18.51	9 (Note: 14 delegates, if Bloomberg's and Warren's statewide delegates would have been calculated.)
Elizabeth Warren	168,695	17.57	8 (Note: 12 delegates, if Bloomberg's and Warren's statewide delegates would have been calculated.)
Tulsi Gabbard	10,037	1.05	
Andrew Yang (withdrawn)	3,988	0.42	
Tom Steyer (withdrawn) (Note: Candidate withdrew shortly before the primary and after the start of early in-person voting.)	3,323	0.35	
Cory Booker (withdrawn)	1,276	0.13	
Marianne Williamson (withdrawn)	1,086	0.11	
Deval Patrick (withdrawn)	227	0.02	
Other candidates	1,911	0.20	
Total	960,128	100%	67

==== Maine ====
2020 Maine Democratic presidential primary
Candidate	Votes	%	Delegates
Joe Biden	68,729	33.37	11
Bernie Sanders	66,826	32.45	9
Elizabeth Warren	32,055	15.57	4
Michael Bloomberg	24,294	11.80	
Pete Buttigieg (withdrawn) (Note: Candidate withdrew during absentee voting, shortly before the date of the election.)	4,364	2.12	
Amy Klobuchar (withdrawn)	2,826	1.37	
Tulsi Gabbard	1,815	0.88	
Andrew Yang (withdrawn) (Note: Candidate withdrew following the New Hampshire primary, when absentee voting had already begun.)	696	0.34	
Tom Steyer (withdrawn)	313	0.15	
Deval Patrick (withdrawn)	218	0.11	
Marianne Williamson (withdrawn)	201	0.10	
Cory Booker (withdrawn)	183	0.09	
Blank ballots	3,417	1.66	
Total	205,937	100%	24

==== Massachusetts ====
Popular vote share by county

2020 Massachusetts Democratic presidential primary
Candidate	Votes	%	Delegates
Joe Biden	473,861	33.41	37
Bernie Sanders	376,990	26.58	30
Elizabeth Warren	303,864	21.43	24
Michael Bloomberg	166,200	11.72	
Pete Buttigieg (withdrawn) (Note: Candidate withdrew after early voting started, but before the date of the election.)	38,400	2.71	
Amy Klobuchar (withdrawn)	17,297	1.22	
Tulsi Gabbard	10,548	0.74	
Deval Patrick (withdrawn)	6,923	0.49	
Tom Steyer (withdrawn)	6,762	0.48	
Andrew Yang (withdrawn)	2,708	0.19	
Michael Bennet (withdrawn)	1,257	0.09	
John Delaney (withdrawn)	675	0.05	
Marianne Williamson (withdrawn)	617	0.04	
Cory Booker (withdrawn)	426	0.03	
Julian Castro (withdrawn)	305	0.02	
All Others	1,941	0.14	
No Preference	5,345	0.38	
Blank ballots	4,061	0.29	
Total	1,418,180	100%	91

==== Minnesota ====
Popular vote share by county
Biden—30–40%
Biden—40–50%
Biden—50–60%
Biden—60–70%
Sanders—<30%
Sanders—30–40%
Klobuchar—<30%
Klobuchar—30–40%
Klobuchar—40–50%

Popular vote share by congressional district
Biden—30–40%
Biden—40–50%
Sanders—30–40%

2020 Minnesota Democratic presidential primary
Candidate	Votes	%	Delegates
Joe Biden	287,553	38.64	38
Bernie Sanders	222,431	29.89	27
Elizabeth Warren	114,674	15.41	10
Michael Bloomberg	61,882	8.32	
Amy Klobuchar (withdrawn) (Note: Candidate withdrew shortly before the primary when absentee voting had already begun.)	41,530	5.58	
Pete Buttigieg (withdrawn)	7,616	1.02	
Tulsi Gabbard	2,504	0.34	
Andrew Yang (withdrawn) (Note: Candidate withdrew after the New Hampshire primary when absentee voting had already begun.)	1,749	0.24	
Tom Steyer (withdrawn)	551	0.07	
Michael Bennet (withdrawn)	315	0.04	
Marianne Williamson (withdrawn)	226	0.03	
Cory Booker (withdrawn)	197	0.03	
John Delaney (withdrawn) (Note: Candidate withdrew during the first days of absentee voting.)	172	0.02	
Julian Castro (withdrawn)	114	0.02	
Deval Patrick (withdrawn) (Note: Candidate withdrew after in-person absentee voting started on January 17, 2020.)	72	0.01	
Uncommitted	2,612	0.35	
Total	744,198	100%	75

==== North Carolina ====
Popular vote share by county Biden—<30% Biden—30–40% Biden—40–50% Biden—50–60% Biden—60–70% Sanders—30–40% Sanders—40–50%

2020 North Carolina Democratic presidential primary
Candidate	Votes	%	Delegates
Joe Biden	572,271	42.95	68
Bernie Sanders	322,645	24.22	37
Michael Bloomberg	172,558	12.95	3
Elizabeth Warren	139,912	10.50	2
Pete Buttigieg (withdrawn) (Note: Candidate withdrew during early voting, shortly before the date of the election.)	43,632	3.27	
Amy Klobuchar (withdrawn)	30,742	2.31	
Tom Steyer (withdrawn)	10,679	0.80	
Tulsi Gabbard	6,622	0.50	
Andrew Yang (withdrawn)	2,973	0.22	
Cory Booker (withdrawn)	2,181	0.16	
Michael Bennet (withdrawn)	1,978	0.15	
Deval Patrick (withdrawn)	1,341	0.10	
Marianne Williamson (withdrawn)	1,243	0.09	
John Delaney (withdrawn)	1,098	0.08	
Julian Castro (withdrawn)	699	0.05	
No Preference	21,808	1.64	
Total	1,332,382	100%	110

==== Oklahoma ====
Popular vote share by county Biden—<30% Biden—30–40% Biden—40–50%

2020 Oklahoma Democratic presidential primary
Candidate	Votes	%	Delegates
Joe Biden	117,633	38.66	21
Bernie Sanders	77,425	25.45	13
Michael Bloomberg	42,270	13.89	2
Elizabeth Warren	40,732	13.39	1
Amy Klobuchar (withdrawn) (Note: Candidate withdrew during absentee voting, shortly before the election.)	6,733	2.21	
Pete Buttigieg (withdrawn)	5,115	1.68	
Tulsi Gabbard	5,109	1.68	
Tom Steyer (withdrawn)	2,006	0.66	
Andrew Yang (withdrawn)	1,997	0.66	
Cory Booker (withdrawn)	1,530	0.50	
Michael Bennet (withdrawn)	1,273	0.42	
Marianne Williamson (withdrawn)	1,158	0.38	
Deval Patrick (withdrawn)	680	0.22	
Julian Castro (withdrawn)	620	0.20	
Total	304,281	100%	37

==== Tennessee ====
Popular vote share by county Biden—30–40% Biden—40–50% Biden—50–60% Biden—60–70% Sanders—30–40%

2020 Tennessee Democratic presidential primary
Candidate	Votes	%	Delegates
Joe Biden	215,390	41.72	36 (Note: 33 delegates, if Bloomberg's statewide delegates would have been calculated.)
Bernie Sanders	129,168	25.02	22 (Note: 20 delegates, if Bloomberg's statewide delegates would have been calculated.)
Michael Bloomberg	79,789	15.46	5 (Note: 10 delegates, if Bloomberg's statewide delegates would have been calculated.)
Elizabeth Warren	53,732	10.41	1
Pete Buttigieg (withdrawn) (Note: Candidate withdrew shortly before the primary, after early voting started.)	17,102	3.31	
Amy Klobuchar (withdrawn)	10,671	2.07	
Tulsi Gabbard	2,278	0.44	
Tom Steyer (withdrawn)	1,932	0.37	
Michael Bennet (withdrawn)	1,650	0.32	
Andrew Yang (withdrawn)	1,097	0.21	
Cory Booker (withdrawn)	953	0.18	
Marianne Williamson (withdrawn)	498	0.10	
John Delaney (withdrawn)	378	0.07	
Julian Castro (withdrawn)	239	0.05	
Deval Patrick (withdrawn)	182	0.04	
Uncommitted	1,191	0.23	
Total	516,250	100%	64

==== Texas ====
Results by county, showing the candidate receiving the most votes in each county. Joe Biden Bernie Sanders Michael Bloomberg Elizabeth Warren Tie

2020 Texas Democratic presidential primary
Candidate	Votes	%	Delegates
Joe Biden	725,562	34.64	113
Bernie Sanders	626,339	29.91	99
Michael Bloomberg	300,608	14.35	11
Elizabeth Warren	239,237	11.42	5
Pete Buttigieg (withdrawn) (Note: Candidate withdrew shortly before the primary after early voting had already started.)	82,671	3.95	
Amy Klobuchar (withdrawn)	43,291	2.07	
Julian Castro (withdrawn)	16,688	0.80	
Tom Steyer (withdrawn)	13,929	0.67	
Michael Bennet (withdrawn)	10,324	0.49	
Tulsi Gabbard	8,688	0.41	
Andrew Yang (withdrawn)	6,674	0.32	
Cory Booker (withdrawn)	4,941	0.24	
Marianne Williamson (withdrawn)	3,918	0.19	
John Delaney (withdrawn)	3,280	0.16	
Deval Patrick (withdrawn)	1,304	0.06	
Other candidates	6,974	0.33	
Total	2,094,428	100%	228

==== Utah ====
2020 Utah Democratic presidential primary
Candidate	Votes	%	Delegates
Bernie Sanders	79,728	36.14	16 (Note: 13 delegates, if Warren's and Bloomberg's statewide delegates would have been calculated.)
Joe Biden	40,674	18.44	7 (Note: 6 delegates, if Warren's and Bloomberg's statewide delegates would have been calculated.)
Elizabeth Warren	35,727	16.20	3 (Note: 5 delegates, if Warren's and Bloomberg's statewide delegates would have been calculated.)
Michael Bloomberg	33,991	15.41	3 (Note: 5 delegates, if Warren's and Bloomberg's statewide delegates would have been calculated.)
Pete Buttigieg (withdrawn) (Note: Candidate withdrew shortly before the primary after all-mail voting had started.)	18,734	8.49	
Amy Klobuchar (withdrawn)	7,603	3.45	
Tulsi Gabbard	1,704	0.77	
Andrew Yang (withdrawn)	950	0.43	
Tom Steyer (withdrawn)	703	0.32	
Marianne Williamson (withdrawn)	220	0.10	
Julian Castro (withdrawn)	159	0.07	
Cory Booker (withdrawn)	138	0.06	
Deval Patrick (withdrawn)	55	0.02	
Other candidates	196	0.09	
Total	220,582	100%	29

==== Vermont ====
Popular vote share by county Sanders—40–50% Sanders—50–60%

2020 Vermont Democratic presidential primary
Candidate	Votes	%	Delegates
Bernie Sanders	79,921	50.57	11
Joe Biden	34,669	21.94	5
Elizabeth Warren	19,785	12.52	
Michael Bloomberg	14,828	9.38	
Pete Buttigieg (withdrawn) (Note: Candidate withdrew during absentee voting, shortly before the primary.)	3,709	2.35	
Amy Klobuchar (withdrawn)	1,991	1.26	
Tulsi Gabbard	1,303	0.82	
Andrew Yang (withdrawn) (Note: Candidate withdrew following the New Hampshire primary, when absentee voting had already begun.)	591	0.37	
Tom Steyer (withdrawn)	202	0.13	
Deval Patrick (withdrawn)	137	0.09	
Marianne Williamson (withdrawn)	135	0.09	
Donald Trump (write-in Republican)	83	0.05	
Julian Castro (withdrawn)	52	0.03	
Hillary Clinton (write-in)	5	0.00	
Michael Bennet (write-in)	3	0.00	
Other candidates / Write-in	(Note: Including "Blank" (written in) with 8 votes; Ron Paul, Michelle Obama, John Edwards and two others with 2 votes; and 110 other write-ins with 1 vote)238	0.15	
Overvotes / Blank votes	(Note: 57 overvotes and 323 blank votes)380	0.24	
Total	158,032	100%	16

==== Virginia ====
Popular vote share by county
Biden—30–40%
Biden—40–50%
Biden—50–60%
Biden—60–70%
Biden—70–80%
Sanders—30–40%
Sanders—40–50%

Popular vote share by congressional district
Biden—40–50%
Biden—50–60%

2020 Virginia Democratic presidential primary (Note: The "2020 March Democratic Presidential Primary" website published by the Virginia Department of Elections does not include the write-in votes. This article includes them.)
Candidate	Votes	%	Delegates
Joe Biden	705,501	53.30	67
Bernie Sanders	306,388	23.15	31
Elizabeth Warren	142,546	10.77	1
Michael Bloomberg	128,030	9.67	
Tulsi Gabbard	11,288	0.85	
Pete Buttigieg (withdrawn) (Note: Candidate withdrew during absentee voting, shortly before the primary.)	11,199	0.85	
Amy Klobuchar (withdrawn)	8,414	0.64	
Andrew Yang (withdrawn) (Note: Candidate withdrew following the New Hampshire primary, when absentee voting had already begun.)	3,361	0.25	
Cory Booker (withdrawn)	1,910	0.14	
Tom Steyer (withdrawn)	1,472	0.11	
Michael Bennet (withdrawn)	1,437	0.11	
Marianne Williamson (withdrawn)	902	0.07	
Julian Castro (withdrawn)	691	0.05	
Deval Patrick (withdrawn)	370	0.03	
Write-in votes	184	0.01	
Total	1,323,693	100%	99

=== Mid/Late-March ===
==== Democrats Abroad ====
Results of the primary were announced on Monday, March 23, 2020.

2020 Democrats Abroad presidential primary
Candidate	Votes	%	Delegates
Bernie Sanders	23,139	57.87	9
Joe Biden	9,059	22.66	4
Elizabeth Warren (withdrawn) (Note: Candidate suspended campaign during the voting period.)	5,730	14.33	
Michael Bloomberg (withdrawn) (Note: Candidate suspended campaign and subsequently officially withdrew during the voting period.)	892	2.23	
Pete Buttigieg (withdrawn) (Note: Candidate withdrew shortly before the primary, when online voting had already begun.)	616	1.54	
Amy Klobuchar (withdrawn)	224	0.56	
Tulsi Gabbard	147	0.37	
Andrew Yang (withdrawn)	85	0.21	
Deval Patrick (withdrawn)	26	0.07	
Tom Steyer (withdrawn)	19	0.05	
Uncommitted	48	0.12	
Total	39,985	100%	13

==== Idaho ====
2020 Idaho Democratic presidential primary
Candidate	Votes	%	Delegates
Joe Biden	53,151	48.92	12
Bernie Sanders	46,114	42.44	8
Elizabeth Warren (withdrawn) (Note: Candidate withdrew during early voting following Super Tuesday.)	2,878	2.65	
Michael Bloomberg (withdrawn)	2,612	2.40	
Pete Buttigieg (withdrawn) (Note: Candidate withdrew during early voting before Super Tuesday.)	1,426	1.31	
Tulsi Gabbard	876	0.81	
Amy Klobuchar (withdrawn)	774	0.71	
Andrew Yang (withdrawn)	310	0.29	
Tom Steyer (withdrawn)	112	0.10	
Michael Bennet (withdrawn)	91	0.08	
John Delaney (withdrawn)	65	0.06	
Marianne Williamson (withdrawn)	57	0.05	
Cory Booker (withdrawn)	55	0.05	
Julian Castro (withdrawn)	49	0.05	
Deval Patrick (withdrawn)	19	0.02	
Other candidates	60	0.06	
Total	108,649	100%	20

==== Michigan ====
2020 Michigan Democratic presidential primary
Candidate	Votes	%	Delegates
Joe Biden	840,360	52.93	73
Bernie Sanders	576,926	36.34	52
Michael Bloomberg (withdrawn) (Note: Candidate withdrew during absentee voting, following Super Tuesday.)	73,464	4.63	
Elizabeth Warren (withdrawn)	26,148	1.65	
Pete Buttigieg (withdrawn) (Note: Candidate withdrew during absentee voting, before Super Tuesday.)	22,462	1.41	
Amy Klobuchar (withdrawn)	11,018	0.69	
Tulsi Gabbard	9,461	0.60	
Andrew Yang (withdrawn) (Note: Candidate withdrew during absentee voting, following the New Hampshire primary.)	2,380	0.15	
Tom Steyer (withdrawn)	1,732	0.11	
Michael Bennet (withdrawn)	1,536	0.10	
Cory Booker (withdrawn)	840	0.05	
Joe Sestak (withdrawn)	757	0.05	
Marianne Williamson (withdrawn)	719	0.05	
John Delaney (withdrawn) (Note: Candidate withdrew in January, shortly after absentee voting had begun.)	464	0.03	
Julian Castro (withdrawn)	306	0.02	
Uncommitted	19,106	1.20	
Total	1,587,679	100%	125

==== Mississippi ====
2020 Mississippi Democratic presidential primary
Candidate	Votes	%	Delegates
Joe Biden	222,160	80.96	34
Bernie Sanders	40,657	14.82	2
Michael Bloomberg (withdrawn)	6,933	2.53	
Elizabeth Warren (withdrawn)	1,550	0.56	
Tulsi Gabbard	1,003	0.37	
Pete Buttigieg (withdrawn)	562	0.20	
Andrew Yang (withdrawn)	450	0.16	
Amy Klobuchar (withdrawn)	440	0.16	
Tom Steyer (withdrawn)	378	0.14	
Deval Patrick (withdrawn)	258	0.09	
Total	274,391	100%	36

==== Missouri ====
2020 Missouri Democratic presidential primary
Candidate	Votes	%	Delegates
Joe Biden	400,347	60.10	44
Bernie Sanders	230,374	34.59	24
Michael Bloomberg (withdrawn)	9,866	1.48	
Elizabeth Warren (withdrawn)	8,156	1.22	
Tulsi Gabbard	4,887	0.73	
Pete Buttigieg (withdrawn)	3,309	0.50	
Amy Klobuchar (withdrawn)	2,682	0.40	
Andrew Yang (withdrawn)	953	0.14	
Cory Booker (withdrawn)	651	0.10	
Tom Steyer (withdrawn)	584	0.09	
Michael Bennet (withdrawn)	206	0.03	
Marianne Williamson (withdrawn)	170	0.03	
John Delaney (withdrawn)	159	0.02	
Julian Castro (withdrawn)	103	0.02	
Henry Hewes	94	0.01	
Deval Patrick (withdrawn)	52	0.01	
Other candidates	1,025	0.15	
Uncommitted	2,494	0.37	
Total	666,112	100%	68

==== North Dakota ====
All of the withdrawn candidates had withdrawn from the race while mail-in voting had already begun.

2020 North Dakota Democratic presidential caucuses
Candidate	Votes	%	Delegates
Bernie Sanders	7,682	52.81	8
Joe Biden	5,742	39.47	6
Elizabeth Warren (withdrawn)	366	2.52	
Amy Klobuchar (withdrawn)	223	1.53	
Pete Buttigieg (withdrawn)	164	1.13	
Michael Bloomberg (withdrawn)	113	0.78	
Tulsi Gabbard	89	0.61	
Andrew Yang (withdrawn)	20	0.14	
Tom Steyer (withdrawn)	6	0.04	
Michael Bennet (withdrawn)	3	0.02	
John Delaney (withdrawn)	3	0.02	
Deval Patrick (withdrawn)	2	0.01	
Unsigned votes / Overvotes / Blank Votes	(Note: Unsigned 87, over 7, blank 39 votes)133	0.91	
Total	14,546	100%	14

==== Washington ====
Popular vote share by county Biden—30–40% Biden—40–50% Sanders—30–40% Sanders—40–50%

2020 Washington Democratic presidential primary
Candidate	Votes	%	Delegates
Joe Biden	591,403	37.98	46
Bernie Sanders	570,039	36.60	43
Elizabeth Warren (withdrawn) (Note: Candidate withdrew after Super Tuesday when all-mail voting had already begun.)	142,652	9.16	
Michael Bloomberg (withdrawn)	122,530	7.87	
Pete Buttigieg (withdrawn) (Note: Candidate withdrew before Super Tuesday when all-mail voting had already begun.)	63,344	4.07	
Amy Klobuchar (withdrawn)	33,383	2.14	
Tulsi Gabbard	13,199	0.85	
Andrew Yang (withdrawn)	6,403	0.41	
Tom Steyer (withdrawn)	3,455	0.22	
Michael Bennet (withdrawn)	2,044	0.13	
Cory Booker (withdrawn)	1,314	0.08	
John Delaney (withdrawn)	573	0.04	
Deval Patrick (withdrawn)	508	0.03	
Uncommitted	6,450	0.41	
Total	1,557,297	100.00%	89

==== Northern Mariana Islands ====
2020 Northern Mariana Islands Democratic presidential caucus
Candidate	Votes	%	Delegates
Bernie Sanders	84	62.69	4
Joe Biden	48	35.82	2
Uncommitted	2	1.49	
Total	134	100%	6

==== Arizona ====
Popular vote share by county Biden—40–50% Biden—50–60% Sanders—30–40% Sanders—40–50%

2020 Arizona Democratic presidential primary
Candidate	Votes	%	Delegates
Joe Biden	268,029	43.70	38
Bernie Sanders	200,456	32.70	29
Elizabeth Warren (withdrawn) (Note: Candidate withdrew after Super Tuesday during early voting.)	35,537	5.79	
Pete Buttigieg (withdrawn) (Note: Candidate withdrew before Super Tuesday during early voting.)	24,868	4.05	
Tulsi Gabbard	3,014	0.49	
Andrew Yang (withdrawn)	1,921	0.31	
Julian Castro (withdrawn)	754	0.12	
Marianne Williamson (withdrawn)	668	0.11	
Deval Patrick (withdrawn)	242	0.04	
Henry Hewes	208	0.03	
Other candidates	812	0.13	
Other votes	4,942	0.81	
Ineligible candidates (Note: While Bloomberg, Klobuchar, Steyer, Delaney, Booker and Bennet had formally withdrawn and were not published in the final state canvass, those ballots were included by the state as part of overall cast ballots and any media covering the primary reported individual vote tallies for those candidates.) Michael Bloomberg; Amy Klobuchar; Tom Steyer; John Delaney; Cory Booker; Michael Bennet	71,904 58,797; 10,333; 1,381; 505; 494; 394	11.72 9.59; 1.68; 0.23; 0.08; 0.08; 0.06	
Total	613,355	100%	67

==== Florida ====
Popular vote share by county Biden—40–50% Biden—50–60% Biden—60–70% Biden—70–80% Biden—80–90%

2020 Florida Democratic presidential primary
Candidate	Votes	%	Delegates
Joe Biden	1,077,375	61.95	162
Bernie Sanders	397,311	22.84	57
Michael Bloomberg (withdrawn) (Note: Candidate withdrew after Super Tuesday when early voting had begun in a few counties.)	146,544	8.43	
Pete Buttigieg (withdrawn)	39,886	2.29	
Elizabeth Warren (withdrawn)	32,875	1.89	
Amy Klobuchar (withdrawn)	17,276	0.99	
Tulsi Gabbard	8,712	0.50	
Andrew Yang (withdrawn)	5,286	0.30	
Michael Bennet (withdrawn)	4,244	0.24	
Tom Steyer (withdrawn)	2,510	0.14	
Marianne Williamson (withdrawn)	1,744	0.10	
John Delaney (withdrawn)	1,583	0.09	
Cory Booker (withdrawn)	1,507	0.09	
Julián Castro (withdrawn)	1,036	0.06	
Joe Sestak (withdrawn)	664	0.04	
Deval Patrick (withdrawn)	661	0.04	
Total	1,739,214	100%	219

==== Illinois ====
2020 Illinois Democratic presidential primary
Candidate	Votes	%	Delegates
Joe Biden	986,661	58.94	95
Bernie Sanders	605,701	36.18	60
Michael Bloomberg (withdrawn) (Note: Candidate withdrew after Super Tuesday during early voting.)	25,500	1.52	
Elizabeth Warren (withdrawn)	24,413	1.46	
Pete Buttigieg (withdrawn) (Note: Candidate withdrew shortly before Super Tuesday during early voting.)	9,729	0.58	
Tulsi Gabbard	9,642	0.58	
Andrew Yang (withdrawn) (Note: Candidate withdrew after the New Hampshire primary when early voting had already begun.)	4,021	0.24	
Cory Booker (withdrawn)	2,684	0.16	
Tom Steyer (withdrawn)	1,684	0.10	
Deval Patrick (withdrawn)	1,567	0.09	
Michael Bennet (withdrawn)	1,346	0.08	
John Delaney (withdrawn)	1,185	0.07	
Total	1,674,133	100%	155

=== April–May ===
==== Wisconsin ====
2020 Wisconsin Democratic presidential primary
Candidate	Votes	%	Delegates
Joe Biden	581,463	62.86	56
Bernie Sanders	293,441	31.72	28
Elizabeth Warren (withdrawn)	14,060	1.52	
Michael Bloomberg (withdrawn)	8,846	0.96	
Amy Klobuchar (withdrawn)	6,079	0.66	
Tulsi Gabbard (withdrawn)	5,565	0.60	
Pete Buttigieg (withdrawn)	4,946	0.53	
Andrew Yang (withdrawn)	3,349	0.36	
Tom Steyer (withdrawn)	836	0.09	
John Delaney (withdrawn)	529	0.06	
Michael Bennet (withdrawn)	475	0.05	
Deval Patrick (withdrawn)	311	0.03	
Write-in votes	1,575	0.17	
Uninstructed Delegate	3,590	0.39	
Total	925,065	100%	84

==== Alaska ====
2020 Alaska Democratic presidential primary final results
Candidate	Votes	%	Delegates
Joe Biden	10,834	54.83	8
Bernie Sanders (withdrawn)	8,755	44.31	7
Inactive votes (Note: Votes which had all its 5 ranked vote-choices allocated towards eliminated candidates who did not reach the threshold of 15%.)	170	0.86	
Total	19,759	100%	15

==== Wyoming ====
2020 Wyoming Democratic presidential primary final results
Candidate	Votes	%	Delegates
Joe Biden	10,912	70.90	10
Bernie Sanders (withdrawn)	4,206	27.33	4
Inactive votes (Note: Votes which had all its 5 ranked vote-choices allocated towards eliminated candidates who did not reach the threshold of 15%.)	273	1.77	
Total	15,391	100%	14

==== Ohio ====
2020 Ohio Democratic presidential primary
Candidate	Votes	%	Delegates
Joe Biden	647,284	72.37	115
Bernie Sanders (withdrawn)	149,683	16.74	21
Elizabeth Warren (withdrawn)	30,985	3.46	
Michael Bloomberg (withdrawn)	28,704	3.21	
Pete Buttigieg (withdrawn)	15,113	1.69	
Amy Klobuchar (withdrawn)	11,899	1.33	
Tulsi Gabbard (withdrawn)	4,560	0.51	
Tom Steyer (withdrawn)	2,801	0.31	
Michael Bennet (withdrawn)	2,030	0.23	
Deval Patrick (withdrawn)	822	0.09	
Andrew Yang (write-in; withdrawn)	502	0.06	
Total	894,383	100%	136

==== Kansas ====
2020 Kansas Democratic presidential primary final results
Candidate	Votes	%	Delegates
Joe Biden	110,041	74.92	29
Bernie Sanders (withdrawn)	33,142	22.57	10
Inactive votes (Note: Votes which had all its 5 ranked vote-choices allocated towards eliminated candidates who did not reach the threshold of 15%.)	3,690	2.51	
Total	146,873	100%	39

==== Nebraska ====
2020 Nebraska Democratic presidential primary
Candidate	Votes	%	Delegates
Joe Biden	126,444	76.83	29
Bernie Sanders (withdrawn)	23,214	14.10	
Elizabeth Warren (withdrawn)	10,401	6.32	
Tulsi Gabbard (withdrawn)	4,523	2.75	
Total	164,582	100%	29

==== Oregon ====
2020 Oregon Democratic presidential primary
Candidate	Votes	%	Delegates
Joe Biden	408,315	65.99	46
Bernie Sanders (withdrawn)	127,345	20.58	15
Elizabeth Warren (withdrawn)	59,355	9.59	
Tulsi Gabbard (withdrawn)	10,717	1.73	
Write-in votes	12,979	2.10	
Total	618,711	100%	61

==== Hawaii ====
2020 Hawaii Democratic presidential primary
Candidate	Votes	%	Delegates
Joe Biden	21,215	60.54	16
Bernie Sanders (withdrawn)	12,337	35.20	8
Void Votes	68	0.19	
Inactive votes (Note: Votes which had all its 3 ranked vote-choices allocated towards eliminated candidates who did not reach the threshold of 15%.)	1,424	4.06	
Total	35,044	100%	24

=== Early June ===
==== District of Columbia ====
Popular vote share by ward
Biden—60–70%
Biden—70–80%
Biden—80–90%

Popular vote share by precinct
Biden—50–60%
Biden—60–70%
Biden—70–80%
Biden—80–90%
Biden—>90%

2020 District of Columbia Democratic presidential primary
Candidate	Votes	%	Delegates
Joe Biden	84,093	75.97	19
Elizabeth Warren (withdrawn)	14,228	12.85	1
Bernie Sanders (withdrawn)	11,116	10.04	
Tulsi Gabbard (withdrawn)	442	0.40	
Write-in votes	809	0.73	
Total	110,688	100%	20

==== Indiana ====
2020 Indiana Democratic presidential primary
Candidate	Votes	%	Delegates
Joe Biden	380,836	76.48	80
Bernie Sanders (withdrawn)	67,688	13.59	2
Pete Buttigieg (withdrawn)	17,957	3.61	
Elizabeth Warren (withdrawn)	14,344	2.88	
Michael Bloomberg (withdrawn)	4,783	0.96	
Andrew Yang (withdrawn)	4,426	0.89	
Amy Klobuchar (withdrawn)	3,860	0.78	
Tulsi Gabbard (withdrawn)	2,657	0.53	
Tom Steyer (withdrawn)	1,376	0.28	
Total	497,927	100%	82

==== Maryland ====
2020 Maryland Democratic presidential primary
Candidate	Votes	%	Delegates
Joe Biden	879,753	83.72	96
Bernie Sanders (withdrawn)	81,939	7.80	
Elizabeth Warren (withdrawn)	27,134	2.58	
Pete Buttigieg (withdrawn)	7,180	0.68	
Michael Bloomberg (withdrawn)	6,773	0.64	
Andrew Yang (withdrawn)	6,670	0.63	
Amy Klobuchar (withdrawn)	5,685	0.54	
Tulsi Gabbard (withdrawn)	4,226	0.40	
Cory Booker (withdrawn)	2,662	0.25	
Michael Bennet (withdrawn)	2,291	0.22	
Marianne Williamson (withdrawn)	897	0.09	
Julian Castro (withdrawn)	760	0.07	
Tom Steyer (withdrawn)	671	0.06	
Deval Patrick (withdrawn)	406	0.04	
Uncommitted	23,726	2.26	
Total	1,050,773	100%	96

==== Montana ====
2020 Montana Democratic presidential primary
Candidate	Votes	%	Delegates
Joe Biden	111,706	74.48	18
Bernie Sanders (withdrawn)	22,033	14.69	1
Elizabeth Warren (withdrawn)	11,984	7.99	
No Preference	4,250	2.83	
Total	149,973	100%	19

==== New Mexico ====
2020 New Mexico Democratic presidential primary
Candidate	Votes	%	Delegates
Joe Biden	181,700	73.30	30
Bernie Sanders (withdrawn)	37,435	15.10	4
Elizabeth Warren (withdrawn)	14,552	5.87	
Andrew Yang (withdrawn)	4,026	1.62	
Tulsi Gabbard (withdrawn)	2,735	1.10	
Deval Patrick (withdrawn)	971	0.39	
Uncommitted Delegate	6,461	2.61	
Total	247,880	100%	34

==== Pennsylvania ====
2020 Pennsylvania Democratic presidential primary
Candidate	Votes	%	Delegates
Joe Biden	1,264,624	79.26	151
Bernie Sanders (withdrawn)	287,834	18.04	35
Tulsi Gabbard (withdrawn)	43,050	2.70	
Total	1,595,508	100%	186

==== Rhode Island ====
2020 Rhode Island Democratic presidential primary
Candidate	Votes	%	Delegates
Joe Biden	79,728	76.67	25
Bernie Sanders (withdrawn)	15,525	14.93	1
Elizabeth Warren (withdrawn)	4,479	4.31	
Andrew Yang (withdrawn)	802	0.77	
Tulsi Gabbard (withdrawn)	651	0.63	
Write-in votes	936	0.90	
Uncommitted	1,861	1.79	
Total	103,982	100%	26

==== South Dakota ====
2020 South Dakota Democratic presidential primary
Candidate	Votes	%	Delegates
Joe Biden	40,800	77.48	13
Bernie Sanders (withdrawn)	11,861	22.52	3
Total	52,661	100%	16

=== Mid/Late June ===
==== Guam ====
2020 Guam Democratic caucuses
Candidate	Votes	%	Delegates
Joe Biden	270	69.59	5
Bernie Sanders (withdrawn)	118	30.41	2
Total	388	100%	7

==== US Virgin Islands ====
2020 U.S. Virgin Islands Democratic presidential caucuses
Candidate	Votes	%	Delegates
Joe Biden	502	91.27	7
Bernie Sanders (withdrawn)	28	5.09	
Uncommitted	20	3.64	
Total	550	100%	7

==== Georgia ====
2020 Georgia Democratic presidential primary
Candidate	Votes	%	Delegates
Joe Biden	922,177	84.86	105
Bernie Sanders (withdrawn)	101,668	9.36	
Elizabeth Warren (withdrawn)	21,906	2.02	
Andrew Yang (withdrawn)	9,117	0.84	
Michael Bloomberg (withdrawn)	7,657	0.70	
Pete Buttigieg (withdrawn)	6,346	0.58	
Michael Bennet (withdrawn)	5,154	0.47	
Amy Klobuchar (withdrawn)	4,317	0.40	
Tulsi Gabbard (withdrawn)	4,117	0.38	
Tom Steyer (withdrawn)	1,752	0.16	
John Delaney (withdrawn)	1,476	0.14	
Deval Patrick (withdrawn)	1,042	0.10	
Total	1,086,729	100%	105

==== West Virginia ====
2020 West Virginia Democratic presidential primary
Candidate	Votes	%	Delegates
Joe Biden	122,518	65.35	28
Bernie Sanders (withdrawn)	22,793	12.16	
David Lee Rice	15,470	8.25	
Elizabeth Warren (withdrawn)	5,741	3.06	
Tulsi Gabbard (withdrawn)	4,163	2.22	
Michael Bloomberg (withdrawn)	3,759	2.01	
Pete Buttigieg (withdrawn)	3,455	1.84	
Amy Klobuchar (withdrawn)	3,011	1.61	
Andrew Yang (withdrawn)	2,590	1.38	
Michael Bennet (withdrawn)	1,865	0.99	
Tom Steyer (withdrawn)	1,235	0.66	
Deval Patrick (withdrawn)	882	0.47	
Total	187,482	100%	28

==== Kentucky ====
2020 Kentucky Democratic presidential primary
Candidate	Votes	%	Delegates
Joe Biden	365,284	67.91	52
Uncommitted	58,364	10.85	2
Bernie Sanders (withdrawn)	65,055	12.09	
Elizabeth Warren (withdrawn)	15,300	2.84	
Pete Buttigieg (withdrawn)	9,127	1.70	
Andrew Yang (withdrawn)	7,267	1.35	
Tulsi Gabbard (withdrawn)	5,859	1.09	
Amy Klobuchar (withdrawn)	5,296	0.98	
Tom Steyer (withdrawn)	2,656	0.49	
Michael Bennet (withdrawn)	2,514	0.47	
Deval Patrick (withdrawn)	1,183	0.22	
Total	537,905	100%	54

==== New York ====
2020 New York Democratic presidential primary
Candidate	Votes	%	Delegates
Joe Biden	1,136,679	64.62	230
Bernie Sanders (withdrawn)	285,908	16.25	44
Elizabeth Warren (withdrawn)	82,917	4.71	
Michael Bloomberg (withdrawn)	39,433	2.24	
Pete Buttigieg (withdrawn)	22,927	1.30	
Andrew Yang (withdrawn)	22,686	1.29	
Amy Klobuchar (withdrawn)	11,028	0.63	
Tulsi Gabbard (withdrawn)	9,083	0.52	
Deval Patrick (withdrawn)	3,040	0.17	
Michael Bennet (withdrawn)	2,932	0.17	
Tom Steyer (withdrawn)	2,299	0.13	
Blank ballots / Void ballots	(Note: 135,486 blank and 4,621 void ballots)140,107	7.96	
Total	1,759,039	100%	274

=== July–August ===
==== Delaware ====
2020 Delaware Democratic presidential primary
Candidate	Votes	%	Delegates
Joe Biden	81,954	89.39	21
Bernie Sanders (withdrawn)	6,878	7.50	
Elizabeth Warren (withdrawn)	2,850	3.11	
Total	91,682	100%	21

==== New Jersey ====
2020 New Jersey Democratic presidential primary
Candidate	Votes	%	Delegates
Joe Biden	814,188	84.92	121
Bernie Sanders (withdrawn)	140,412	14.65	5
Uncommitted	4,162	0.43	
Total	958,762	100%	126

==== Louisiana ====
2020 Louisiana Democratic presidential primary
Candidate	Votes	%	Delegates
Joe Biden	212,555	79.52	54
Bernie Sanders (withdrawn)	19,859	7.43	
Elizabeth Warren (withdrawn)	6,426	2.40	
Michael Bennet (withdrawn)	6,173	2.31	
Andrew Yang (withdrawn)	4,617	1.73	
Michael Bloomberg (withdrawn)	4,312	1.61	
Amy Klobuchar (withdrawn)	2,431	0.91	
Pete Buttigieg (withdrawn)	2,363	0.88	
Tulsi Gabbard (withdrawn)	1,962	0.73	
John Delaney (withdrawn)	1,877	0.70	
Tom Steyer (withdrawn)	902	0.34	
Deval Patrick (withdrawn)	877	0.33	
Other candidates	2,932	1.10	
Total	267,286	100%	54

==== Puerto Rico ====
2020 Puerto Rico Democratic presidential primary
Candidate	Votes	%	Delegates
Joe Biden	3,930	55.97	44
Bernie Sanders (withdrawn)	932	13.27	5
Michael Bloomberg (withdrawn)	894	12.73	2
Tulsi Gabbard (withdrawn)	194	2.76	
Pete Buttigieg (withdrawn)	158	2.25	
Elizabeth Warren (withdrawn)	101	1.44	
Tom Steyer (withdrawn)	62	0.88	
Amy Klobuchar (withdrawn)	31	0.44	
Undervotes / Overvotes / Blank Ballots	(Note: Under 356, over 89, blank 275 votes)720	10.25	
Total	7,022	100%	51

==== Connecticut ====
2020 Connecticut Democratic presidential primary
Candidate	Votes	%	Delegates
Joe Biden	224,500	84.90	60
Bernie Sanders (withdrawn)	30,512	11.54	
Tulsi Gabbard (withdrawn)	3,429	1.30	
Uncommitted	5,975	2.26	
Total	264,416	100%	60

== Total votes and delegates by candidate ==
Candidates listed received at least 0.01% of the total vote:

Candidate	Total votes	Total delegates
Joe Biden	19,080,502 (51.6%)	2,709
Bernie Sanders	9,680,424 (26.2%)	1,113
Elizabeth Warren	2,832,060 (7.7%)	75
Michael Bloomberg	2,552,434 (6.9%)	49
Pete Buttigieg	924,331 (2.5%)	24
Amy Klobuchar	540,064 (1.5%)	7
Tulsi Gabbard	273,383 (0.7%)	2
Tom Steyer	260,481 (0.7%)	0
Andrew Yang	160,733 (0.4%)	0
Michael Bennet	62,260 (0.1%)	0
Julian Castro	37,037 (0.1%)	0
Cory Booker	31,575 (0.08%)	0
Deval Patrick	27,116 (0.07%)	0
Marianne Williamson	22,334 (0.06%)	0
John Delaney	19,342 (0.05%)	0
David Lee Rice	15,023 (0.04%)	0
Roque De La Fuente III	13,610 (0.03%)	0
Joe Sestak	5,251 (0.01%)	0
