= 2020 New Hampshire Republican presidential primary =

- February 11, 2020

22 pledged delegates

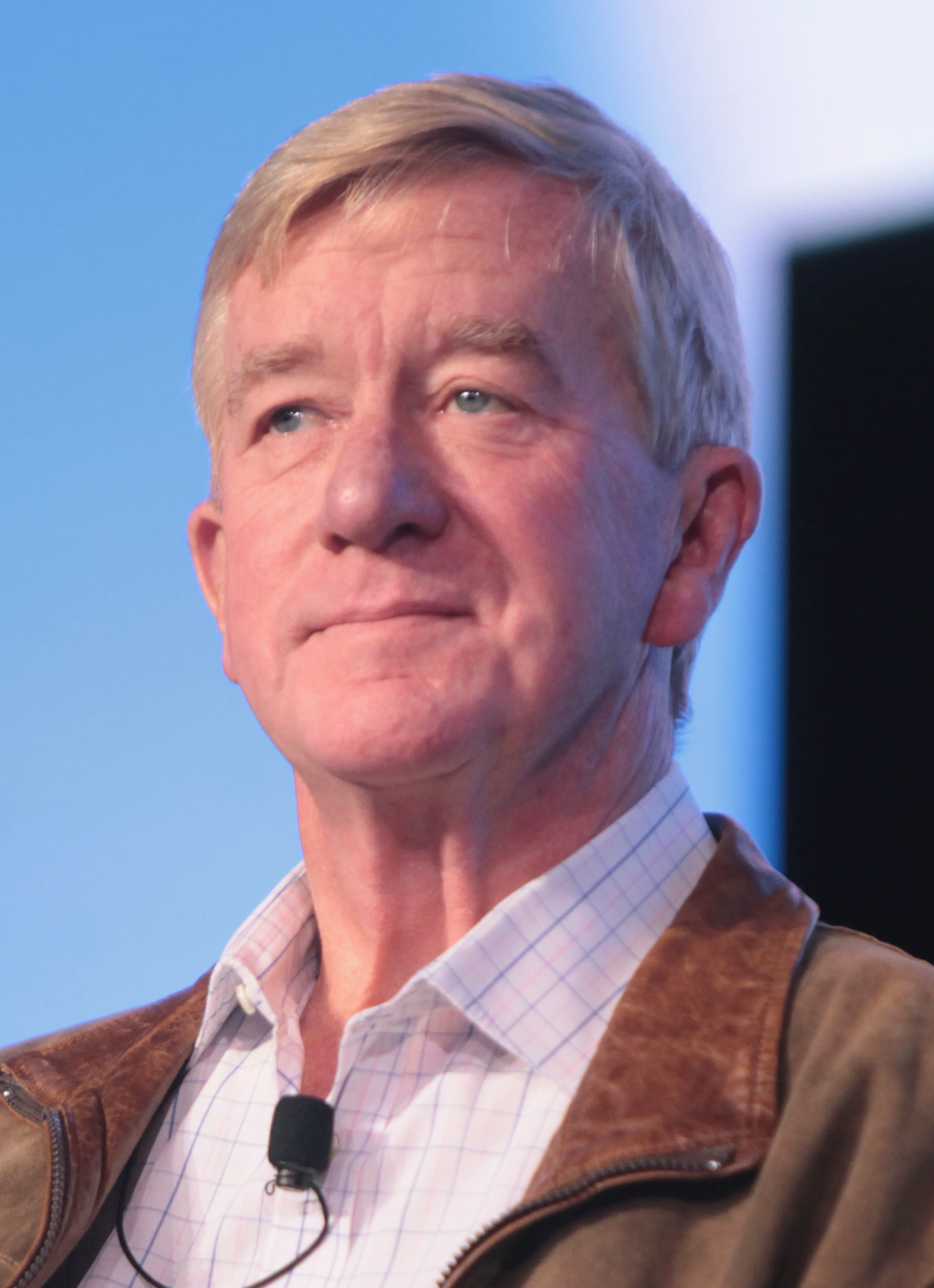
Candidate	Donald Trump	Bill Weld
Home state	Florida	Massachusetts
Delegate count	22	0
Popular vote	129,734	13,844
Percentage	84.4%	9.0%
- Donald Trump

The 2020 New Hampshire Republican presidential primary took place on Tuesday, February 11, 2020, as the second nominating contest in the Republican Party presidential primaries for the 2020 presidential election, following the Iowa caucuses the week before. The New Hampshire primary is a semi-closed primary, meaning that only Republicans and independents may vote in this primary.

Incumbent president Donald Trump won the primary with 84.4 percent of the vote, clinching all of the state's 22 pledged delegates to the national convention. Despite Bill Weld winning 9% of the vote, President Trump received the most votes (129,734) in the New Hampshire primary for an incumbent candidate in U.S. history, moving past the previous record-holder, Bill Clinton, in 1996 (76,797).

== Procedure ==
The state's ballot access laws have been traditionally lenient, with prospective presidential candidates only required to pay a $1,000 fee to secure a line on the primary ballot.

Primary elections are scheduled to be held on Tuesday, February 11, 2020, with the vast majority of polling places closed by 7 p.m. and 13 cities allowed to close at 8 p.m. In this semi-closed Republican primary, candidates must meet a viability threshold of 10 percent at the statewide level in order to be considered viable. New Hampshire's pledged delegates to the 2020 Republican National Convention are then allocated proportionally to candidates who received 10% or more of the vote.

=== Candidates on the ballot ===
The following candidates were on the ballot, and listed in order of filing:

- Rocky De La Fuente, California
- Rick Kraft, New Mexico
- Donald Trump, Florida
- Star Locke, Texas
- Robert Ardini, New York
- Eric Merrill, New Hampshire
- Stephen B. Comley Sr., Massachusetts
- Bob Ely, Illinois
- Zoltan Istvan, California
- Matthew John Matern, California
- "President" R. Boddie, Georgia
- Larry Horn, Oregon
- Bill Weld, Massachusetts
- Juan Payne, Alabama
- Joe Walsh, Illinois
- William N. Murphy, New Hampshire
- Mary Maxwell, New Hampshire

== Campaign ==
All the major candidates, as well as many minor ones, had events in the state starting in 2018.

The famous Lesser-Known Candidates Forum took place on January 28, the latest it has ever been held. Robert Ardini, President R. Boddie, Stephen Comley, Zoltan Istvan, Mary Maxwell, and Bill Murphy participated.

== Results ==
Typically, the top candidates of the other major party receive a large number of write-in votes.

County won by these popular vote results:
Trump—85–90%
Trump—80–85%

Congressional district won by these popular vote results:
Trump—80–85%

2020 New Hampshire Republican primary
Candidate	Votes	%	Estimated delegates
Donald Trump (incumbent)	129,734	84.42	22
Bill Weld	13,844	9.01	0
Joe Walsh (withdrawn)	838	0.55	0
Mitt Romney (write-in)	632	0.41	0
Rocky De La Fuente	148	0.10	0
Robert Ardini	77	0.05	0
Bob Ely	68	0.04	0
Zoltan Istvan	56	0.04	0
Others / Write-in	2,339	1.52	0
Pete Buttigieg (write-in Democratic)	1,136	0.74	0
Amy Klobuchar (write-in Democratic)	1,076	0.70	0
Mike Bloomberg (write-in Democratic)	801	0.52	0
Bernie Sanders (write-in Democratic)	753	0.49	0
Tulsi Gabbard (write-in Democratic)	369	0.24	0
Joe Biden (write-in Democratic)	330	0.21	0
Tom Steyer (write-in Democratic)	191	0.12	0
Andrew Yang (write-in Democratic)	162	0.11	0
Elizabeth Warren (write-in Democratic)	157	0.10	0
Other write-in Democrats	963	0.63	0
Total	153,674	100%	22

== See also ==
- 2020 New Hampshire Democratic presidential primary
- New Hampshire midnight voting
