= 2020 North Dakota Democratic presidential caucuses =

- March 10, 2020

18 delegates (14 pledged, 4 unpledged) to the Democratic National Convention The number of pledged delegates won is determined by the popular vote

Candidate	Bernie Sanders	Joe Biden
Home state	Vermont	Delaware
Delegate count	8	6
Popular vote	7,682	5,742
Percentage	52.81%	39.47%

Joe Biden	Bernie Sanders	N/A

The 2020 North Dakota Democratic presidential caucuses took place on March 10, 2020, as one of several states voting the week after Super Tuesday in the Democratic Party primaries and caucuses for the 2020 presidential election. While the contest has in effect been a party-run open primary for the first time in North Dakota's history, the state party retained the traditional caucus name, classifying it as a firehouse caucus. The state awarded 18 delegates to the 2020 Democratic National Convention, of which 14 were pledged delegates allocated on the basis of the results of the election.

Senator Bernie Sanders decisively won the caucuses with almost 53% of the vote and 8 delegates over former vice president Joe Biden who won almost 40% and 6 delegates, as North Dakota was the only state on that day and the last state of the primary season to vote in favor of Sanders.

== Procedure ==
North Dakota was one of six states (along with Democrats Abroad) which held primaries on March 10, 2020, one week after Super Tuesday. On March 13, 2019, the North Dakota Democratic–Nonpartisan League Party released its draft delegate selection plan, which moved away from the previous caucus system and called for the creation, in effect, of a party-run primary referred to by the party as a "firehouse caucus". The date was also moved back from June in 2016 to a more relevant date in March.

Voting by mail began on January 20, 2020, and continued through March 5. On March 10, polls opened and closed simultaneously throughout the state, with in-person voting through a ballot system taking place between 11:00 a.m. and 7:00 p.m. in the Central Time Zone and from 10:00 a.m. until 6:00 p.m. within the Mountain Time Zone at firehouse caucus locations across the state. Global Election Services (GES), a subsidiary of publicly traded Global Arena Holding, was retained to administer the North Dakota Democratic-NPL Presidential Primary election. In the open caucuses, candidates had to meet a threshold of 15 percent statewide in order to be considered viable. The 14 pledged delegates to the 2020 Democratic National Convention were allocated proportionally on the basis of the results of the firehouse caucus. Of these, 9 corresponded to the result of the statewide vote (coterminous with its sole congressional district) and another 2 were allocated to party leaders and elected officials (PLEO delegates), in addition to 3 at-large delegates, both also according to the statewide vote. The March primary as part of Stage I on the primary timetable received no bonus delegates, in order to disperse the primaries between more different date clusters and keep too many states from hoarding on a March date.

Following legislative district conventions between March 11 and March 14, 2020, to elect state convention delegates, the state convention met virtually between March 19 and March 21, 2020 (originally planned in Minot but cancelled due to the COVID-19 pandemic) and elected 9 national convention district delegates. Afterwards, at the meeting of the select committee on delegates on April 4, 2020, the 9 district delegates elected the 3 at-large and 2 pledged PLEO delegates for the Democratic National Convention. The delegation also included 4 unpledged PLEO delegates: 4 members of the Democratic National Committee.

Pledged national convention delegates
Type	Del.
CD at-large	9
PLEO	2
At-large	3
Total pledged delegates	14

== Candidates ==
The following candidates qualified for the ballot in North Dakota:

Running

- Joe Biden
- Tulsi Gabbard
- Bernie Sanders

Withdrawn

- Michael Bennet
- Michael Bloomberg
- Pete Buttigieg
- John Delaney
- Amy Klobuchar
- Deval Patrick
- Tom Steyer
- Elizabeth Warren
- Andrew Yang

== Polling ==
Poll source	Date(s) administered	Sample size (Note: Key: A – all adults RV – registered voters LV – likely voters V – unclear)	Margin of error	Joe Biden	Tulsi Gabbard	Bernie Sanders	Other	Undecided
Swayable	Mar 7–9, 2020	383 (LV)	± 9%	65%	0%	31%	4%	–

== Results ==
All of the withdrawn candidates had withdrawn from the race while mail-in voting had already begun.

2020 North Dakota Democratic presidential caucuses
Candidate	Votes	%	Delegates
Bernie Sanders	7,682	52.81	8
Joe Biden	5,742	39.47	6
Elizabeth Warren (withdrawn)	366	2.52	
Amy Klobuchar (withdrawn)	223	1.53	
Pete Buttigieg (withdrawn)	164	1.13	
Michael Bloomberg (withdrawn)	113	0.78	
Tulsi Gabbard	89	0.61	
Andrew Yang (withdrawn)	20	0.14	
Tom Steyer (withdrawn)	6	0.04	
Michael Bennet (withdrawn)	3	0.02	
John Delaney (withdrawn)	3	0.02	
Deval Patrick (withdrawn)	2	0.01	
Unsigned votes / Overvotes / Blank Votes	(Note: Unsigned 87, over 7, blank 39 votes)133	0.91	
Total	14,546	100%	14

=== Results by caucus site ===
Caucus site	County	Sanders	%	Biden	%	Others	%	Total	Margin
Fargo	Cass	2,682	65.22%	1,376	33.46%	54	1.32%	4,112	31.76%
Grand Forks	Grand Forks	1,033	56.20%	766	41.68%	39	2.12%	1,838	14.52%
Bismarck	Burleigh	1,126	48.91%	1,136	49.35%	40	1.74%	2,302	-0.44%
Minot	Ward	523	53.04%	441	44.73%	22	2.23%	986	8.31%
Williston	Williams	158	50.80%	139	44.69%	14	4.51%	311	6.11%
Jamestown	Stutsman	156	32.84%	307	64.63%	12	2.53%	475	-31.79%
Devils Lake	Ramsey	87	32.46%	176	65.67%	5	1.87%	268	-33.21%
Valley City	Barnes	110	33.13%	212	63.86%	10	3.01%	332	-30.73%
Dickinson	Stark	212	56.68%	152	40.64%	10	2.68%	375	16.04%
Belcourt	Rolette	286	64.71%	146	33.03%	10	2.26%	442	31.67%
Cannon Ball	Sioux	103	76.87%	28	20.90%	3	2.23%	134	55.97%
New Town	Mountrail	164	62.84%	94	36.02%	3	1.14%	261	26.82%
Wahpeton	Richland	111	38.81%	168	58.74%	7	2.45%	286	-19.93%
Fort Totten	Benson	53	67.95%	21	26.92%	4	5.13%	78	41.03%
Vote By Mail	-	878	39.66%	580	26.20%	756	34.14%	2,214	13.46%

== See also ==
- 2020 North Dakota Republican presidential caucuses
