= 2020 Democrats Abroad presidential primary =

- March 3–10, 2020

17 delegate votes (13 pledged, 4 unpledged) to the Democratic National Convention The number of pledged delegates won is determined by the popular vote

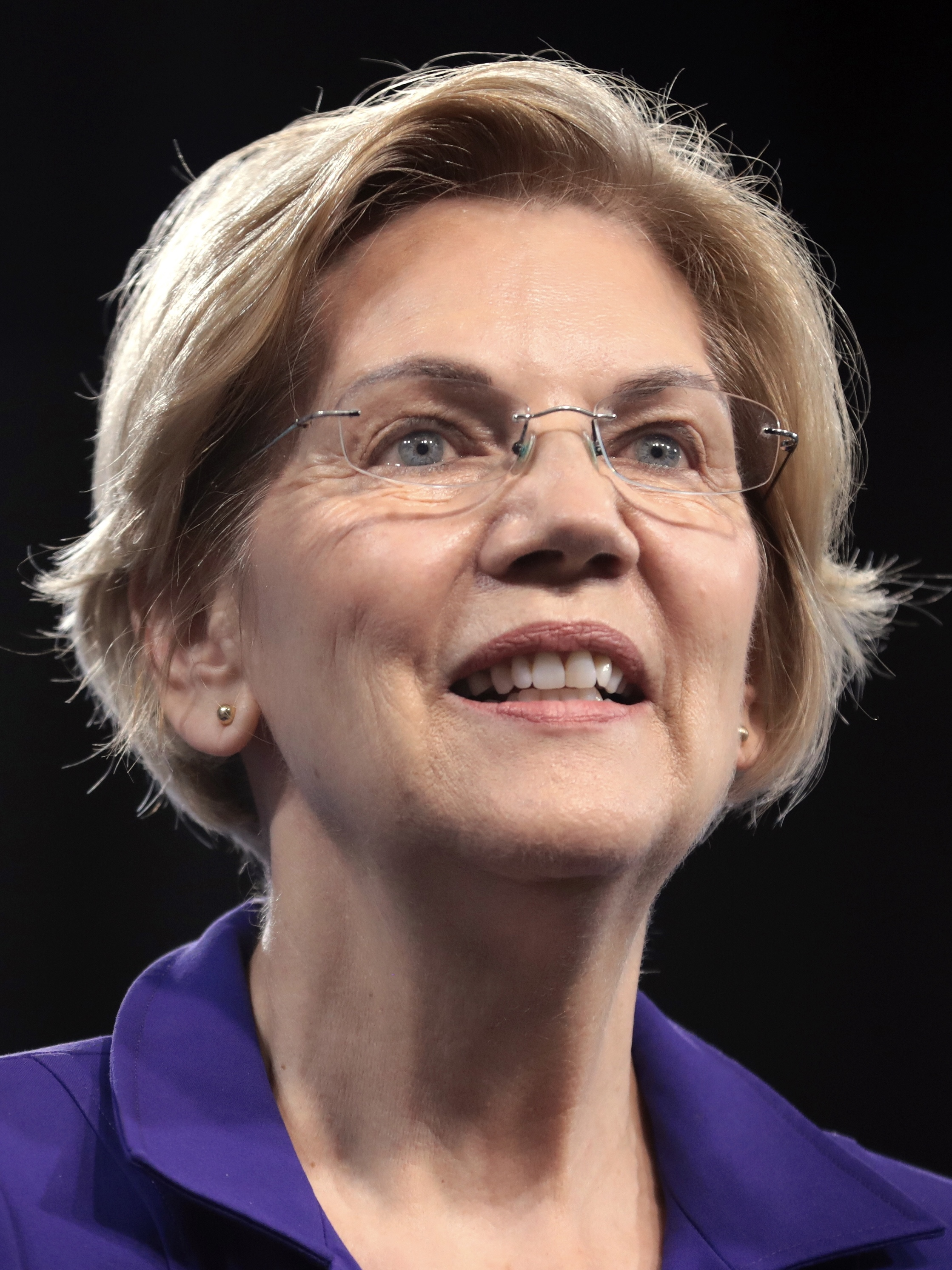
Candidate	Bernie Sanders	Joe Biden	Elizabeth Warren (withdrawn) (Note: Warren withdrew on March 5, 2020, while voting was occurring, but before the primary ended.)
Home state	Vermont	Delaware	Massachusetts
Delegate count	9	4	0
Popular vote	23,139	9,059	5,730
Percentage	57.9%	22.7%	14.3%
- Joe Biden Bernie Sanders Elizabeth Warren Biden/Sanders Tie Sanders/Warren Tie

The 2020 Democrats Abroad Presidential Primary took place from March 3 to 10, 2020, allowing U.S. citizens residing outside the United States and those officially affiliated with Democrats Abroad to participate in the Democratic Party's 2020 presidential nomination process. Spanning more than 230 voting locations worldwide, participants cast their in-person votes across various countries and continents. Alternative voting methods included e-mail and postal mail. The voting period started on Super Tuesday and concluded the Tuesday of the following week. The 2020 Democrats Abroad Global Primary allocated a total of 21 delegates to the 2020 Democratic National Convention. Among these, 13 were pledged delegates, committed to supporting a specific candidate based on primary results, each holding a full vote. Additionally, 8 automatic delegates, unbound to any candidate and each possessing a half vote, contributed to a cumulative total of 17 votes.

The official results were announced on 23 March 2020. U.S. Senator Bernie Sanders emerged as the victor, with a strong showing with approximately 58% of the vote, resulting in the allocation of 9 delegates. Former Vice President Joe Biden garnered nearly 23% of the vote, translating in the allocation of 4 delegates. Meanwhile, U.S. Senator Elizabeth Warren, despite formally withdrawing from the presidential race two days after Super Tuesday, earned around 14% of the vote, falling short of the mandated 15% threshold for delegate allocation.

== Procedure ==
The Democrats Abroad party-run global primary ran from March 3 (Super Tuesday) to March 10, 2020, at hundreds of voting centers around the world. Votes were also cast by fax, email, or post.

Eligibility: Voters had to meet the following criteria to vote

- Be abroad and be a U.S. citizen
- Be a member of Democrats Abroad
- Be 18 as of November 3, 2020
- Not have voted, nor plan to vote, in any other 2020 state presidential primary

Voters abroad also voted by downloading a ballot and emailing or postal mailing it to Democrats Abroad from February 18, 2020. Ballots must have been received prior to 12:00 a.m. Pacific Standard Time on March 11, 2020. No proxy voting was permitted. It was not possible for voters to change their vote if their supported candidate had officially withdrawn from the ballot during the voting period.

Candidates had to meet a threshold of 15 percent in order to be allocated pledged delegates to the National Convention. The 13 pledged delegates to the 2020 Democratic National Convention were allocated proportionally on the basis of the results of the party-run primary, also classified as a caucus, including 9 at-large regional delegates (divided between three world regions), one global PLEO delegate (party leader and elected official) and three at-large global delegates. As part of Stage I on the primary timetable there were no bonus delegates for a March contest on a joint date in that year.

Regional conventions were held online (originally planned as regional caucuses during the global convention in Toronto, Canada) for the Americas, Asia-Pacific, and Europe-Middle East-Africa regions on May 16, 2020, and May 17, 2020, selecting 9 national convention delegates, with the number each region was eligible to designate dependent on the proportion of ballots within each region, 6 for Europe-Middle East-Africa, 2 for the Americas, and 1 for Asia-Pacific. Between May 16 and May 17, 2020, the global convention also met online to elect a sole pledged PLEO delegate and 3 at-large delegates for the Democratic National Convention. The delegation also included 8 unpledged delegates: 8 members of the Democratic National Committee, who each had a half vote (meaning 4 unpledged delegate votes).

== Candidates ==
Pledged national convention delegates
Type	Del.
Regional at-large (Note: Europe-Middle East-Africa received 6 delegates, Americas 2, Asia-Pacific 1.)	9
PLEO	1
At-large	3
Total pledged delegates	13

The following people have filed and were on the Democrats Abroad ballot when voting began:

Running

- Joe Biden
- Michael Bloomberg
- Tulsi Gabbard
- Bernie Sanders
- Elizabeth Warren

Withdrawn

- Pete Buttigieg (Note: Candidate withdrew shortly before the primary, when online voting had already begun.)
- Amy Klobuchar
- Deval Patrick
- Tom Steyer
- Andrew Yang

Cory Booker and Michael Bennet originally also qualified, but officially withdrew from the ballot before the primary. Bloomberg and Warren suspended their respective presidential campaigns on March 4 and March 5, while the primary was going on, with Bloomberg also officially withdrawing from the ballot on March 7, not being eligible for the rest of the voting period.

== Results ==
Results of the primary were announced on Monday, March 23, 2020.

2020 Democrats Abroad presidential primary
Candidate	Votes	%	Delegates
Bernie Sanders	23,139	57.87	9
Joe Biden	9,059	22.66	4
Elizabeth Warren (withdrawn) (Note: Candidate suspended campaign during the voting period.)	5,730	14.33	
Michael Bloomberg (withdrawn) (Note: Candidate suspended campaign and subsequently officially withdrew during the voting period.)	892	2.23	
Pete Buttigieg (withdrawn)	616	1.54	
Amy Klobuchar (withdrawn)	224	0.56	
Tulsi Gabbard	147	0.37	
Andrew Yang (withdrawn)	85	0.21	
Deval Patrick (withdrawn)	26	0.07	
Tom Steyer (withdrawn)	19	0.05	
Uncommitted	48	0.12	
Total	39,985	100%	13

=== Results by country ===
Country	Sanders	Biden	Warren	Bloomberg	Buttigieg	Klobuchar	Gabbard	Yang	Patrick	Steyer	Uncommitted	Total	Percent of Total
Afghanistan	1	2	0	0	0	0	0	0	0	0	0	3	0.01%
Albania	7	0	0	0	0	0	0	0	0	0	0	7	0.02%
Algeria	0	1	0	0	0	0	0	0	0	0	0	1	0.00%
Angola	3	0	0	0	0	0	0	0	0	0	0	3	0.01%
Antigua and Barbuda	2	0	0	0	0	0	0	0	0	0	0	2	0.01%
Argentina	87	14	2	2	0	0	1	1	0	0	0	107	0.27%
Armenia	8	0	0	0	0	0	0	0	0	0	0	8	0.02%
Australia	944	324	113	11	12	4	7	2	2	1	0	1420	3.55%
Austria	302	105	75	8	10	2	2	2	0	0	2	508	1.27%
Azerbaijan	2	0	0	0	0	0	0	0	0	0	0	2	0.01%
Bahamas	3	2	0	1	0	0	0	0	0	0	0	6	0.02%
Bahrain	5	0	0	0	0	0	0	0	0	0	0	5	0.01%
Bangladesh	1	2	0	0	0	0	0	0	0	0	0	3	0.01%
Barbados	2	2	0	1	0	0	0	0	0	0	0	5	0.01%
Belarus	2	0	0	0	0	0	0	0	0	0	0	2	0.01%
Belgium	200	81	59	10	5	3	3	1	1	0	0	363	0.91%
Belize	5	1	3	0	0	0	0	0	0	0	0	9	0.02%
Benin	2	2	1	0	0	0	0	0	0	0	0	5	0.01%
Bhutan	0	2	0	0	0	0	0	0	0	0	0	2	0.01%
Bolivia	4	1	1	0	0	0	0	0	0	0	0	6	0.02%
Bosnia and Herzegovina	9	1	3	0	0	0	0	0	0	0	0	13	0.03%
Botswana	0	1	2	0	0	0	0	0	0	0	0	3	0.01%
Brazil	58	24	11	2	2	1	1	0	0	0	0	99	0.25%
Bulgaria	5	0	0	0	1	0	0	0	0	0	0	6	0.02%
Burundi	1	0	0	0	0	0	0	0	0	0	0	1	0.00%
Cambodia	15	2	6	0	0	0	0	0	0	0	0	23	0.06%
Cameroon	2	0	0	0	0	1	0	0	0	0	0	3	0.01%
Canada	2609	1195	659	89	78	26	20	2	4	4	5	4691	11.73%
Cape Verde	0	0	1	0	0	0	0	0	0	0	0	1	0.00%
Central African Republic	1	0	0	0	0	0	0	0	0	0	0	1	0.00%
Chad	0	1	0	0	0	0	0	0	0	0	0	1	0.00%
Chile	53	11	9	2	1	0	0	0	0	0	0	76	0.19%
China	687	227	92	17	11	6	6	16	1	0	3	1066	2.67%
Colombia	80	17	9	1	2	0	0	2	1	1	0	113	0.28%
Comoros	0	1	0	0	0	0	0	0	0	0	0	1	0.00%
Congo DR	4	0	0	0	0	0	0	0	0	0	0	4	0.01%
Costa Rica	255	225	49	8	7	6	1	0	0	0	1	552	1.38%
Croatia	10	1	2	0	0	0	1	0	0	0	0	14	0.04%
Cuba	2	0	0	0	0	0	0	0	0	0	0	2	0.01%
Cyprus	3	0	0	0	0	0	0	0	0	0	0	3	0.01%
Czechia	309	55	56	4	2	1	3	0	0	0	3	433	1.08%
Denmark	356	81	112	10	7	1	4	0	0	1	0	572	1.43%
Dominica	2	0	0	0	0	0	0	0	0	0	0	2	0.01%
Dominican Republic	29	16	2	4	0	0	0	1	1	0	0	53	0.13%
Ecuador	116	69	18	2	6	1	0	0	0	0	0	212	0.53%
Egypt	30	4	0	0	0	0	0	0	0	0	0	34	0.09%
El Salvador	2	1	0	0	0	0	1	0	0	0	0	4	0.01%
Estonia	6	3	2	0	0	0	1	0	0	0	0	12	0.03%
Eswatini	0	1	0	0	0	0	0	0	0	0	0	1	0.00%
Ethiopia	6	3	3	0	0	1	0	0	0	0	0	13	0.03%
Fiji	4	0	3	0	0	0	0	0	0	0	0	7	0.02%
Finland	150	50	33	4	2	2	0	0	0	0	0	241	0.60%
France	1706	720	419	76	73	25	6	3	1	1	4	3034	7.59%
Gambia	2	0	0	0	0	1	0	0	0	0	0	3	0.01%
Georgia	19	2	1	0	1	1	1	0	0	0	0	25	0.06%
Germany	3249	1086	754	51	67	28	16	7	2	1	7	5268	13.18%
Ghana	2	6	1	0	0	0	0	0	0	0	0	9	0.02%
Great Britain	2862	1224	1177	243	125	35	10	6	7	4	9	5702	14.26%
Greece	118	64	35	7	4	2	1	0	0	0	1	232	0.58%
Grenada	2	0	0	0	0	0	0	0	0	0	0	2	0.01%
Guatemala	71	61	35	4	2	1	0	0	0	0	0	174	0.44%
Guinea	1	0	0	0	0	0	0	0	0	0	0	1	0.00%
Guyana	1	0	0	0	0	0	0	0	0	0	0	1	0.00%
Haiti	6	5	0	0	0	0	0	0	0	0	0	11	0.03%
Honduras	8	8	6	0	0	0	0	0	0	0	0	22	0.06%
Hungary	78	26	9	2	0	0	2	0	0	0	0	117	0.29%
Iceland	20	0	0	0	0	0	2	0	0	0	0	22	0.06%
India	128	36	13	5	1	0	6	2	0	0	0	191	0.48%
Indonesia	48	21	12	2	3	0	0	0	0	0	0	86	0.22%
Iran	2	0	0	0	0	0	0	0	0	0	0	2	0.01%
Iraq	3	0	1	0	0	1	0	0	0	0	0	5	0.01%
Israel	236	234	89	55	12	7	3	1	0	0	1	638	1.60%
Italy	382	185	133	27	21	5	3	2	1	0	1	760	1.90%
Ivory Coast	1	1	0	0	0	0	0	0	0	0	0	2	0.01%
Jamaica	1	3	0	0	0	0	0	0	0	0	0	4	0.01%
Japan	757	117	62	6	8	2	4	12	0	0	1	969	2.42%
Jordan	39	4	1	0	1	0	0	0	0	1	0	46	0.12%
Kazakhstan	6	1	1	0	0	0	0	0	0	0	0	8	0.02%
Kenya	20	16	12	0	0	0	1	0	0	0	0	49	0.12%
Korea Republic	367	19	39	4	4	0	2	3	1	0	0	439	1.10%
Kuwait	19	3	1	0	0	0	0	0	0	0	0	23	0.06%
Kyrgyzstan	3	1	1	0	0	0	0	0	0	0	0	5	0.01%
Laos	10	2	2	0	0	0	0	0	0	0	0	14	0.04%
Latvia	5	2	1	0	0	0	0	0	0	0	0	8	0.02%
Lebanon	35	5	1	0	0	1	1	0	0	0	0	43	0.11%
Liberia	0	1	0	0	0	0	0	0	0	0	0	1	0.00%
Lithuania	4	1	1	0	0	0	0	0	0	0	0	6	0.02%
Luxembourg	44	24	10	0	3	0	0	0	0	0	0	81	0.20%
Madagascar	1	0	1	0	0	0	0	0	0	0	0	2	0.01%
Malawi	4	6	0	0	0	0	0	0	0	0	0	10	0.03%
Malaysia	27	15	6	0	1	1	0	0	0	0	0	50	0.13%
Mali	1	1	0	0	0	0	0	0	0	0	0	2	0.01%
Malta	6	1	0	0	1	0	0	0	0	0	0	8	0.02%
Marshall Islands	1	0	0	0	0	0	0	0	0	0	0	1	0.00%
Mauritius	0	0	1	0	0	0	0	0	0	0	0	1	0.00%
Mexico	634	569	187	54	31	16	6	1	1	2	3	1504	3.76%
Micronesia	0	0	1	0	0	0	0	0	0	0	0	1	0.00%
Moldova	11	6	0	0	0	0	1	0	0	0	0	18	0.05%
Monaco	0	3	1	0	0	0	1	0	0	0	0	4	0.01%
Morocco	24	3	7	0	0	0	0	0	0	0	0	34	0.09%
Mozambique	11	1	3	0	0	0	0	0	0	0	0	15	0.04%
Myanmar	17	1	6	0	1	0	0	0	0	0	0	25	0.06%
Nepal	5	2	0	0	1	0	0	0	0	0	0	8	0.02%
Netherlands	772	217	269	32	17	6	2	1	0	0	3	1319	3.30%
New Zealand	248	53	44	3	5	2	2	0	0	0	0	357	0.89%
Nicaragua	5	1	1	0	1	0	0	0	0	0	0	8	0.02%
Nigeria	4	2	1	2	0	0	0	0	0	0	0	9	0.02%
North Macedonia	1	0	0	0	0	0	0	0	0	0	0	1	0.00%
Norway	268	66	76	6	6	5	1	1	0	0	0	429	1.07%
Oman	6	0	1	0	0	0	0	0	0	0	0	7	0.02%
Pakistan	7	1	0	1	0	0	1	0	0	0	0	10	0.03%
Palau	1	0	0	0	0	0	0	0	0	0	0	1	0.00%
Panama	56	73	27	4	0	1	1	1	0	0	1	164	0.41%
Papua New Guinea	1	2	0	0	0	0	0	0	0	0	0	3	0.01%
Paraguay	3	0	1	0	0	0	0	0	0	0	0	4	0.01%
Peru	47	8	21	4	0	0	0	0	0	0	0	80	0.20%
Philippines	68	31	5	6	0	0	0	1	0	0	0	111	0.28%
Poland	48	5	3	1	1	0	0	1	0	0	0	59	0.15%
Portugal	100	61	39	7	2	3	1	0	0	1	1	215	0.54%
Qatar	27	1	1	2	0	0	1	0	0	0	0	32	0.08%
Republic of Ireland	293	86	103	8	6	1	0	1	0	0	0	498	1.25%
Romania	17	14	6	3	0	0	0	0	0	0	0	40	0.10%
Russia	55	17	13	6	2	0	2	0	0	0	0	95	0.24%
Rwanda	19	4	14	0	0	0	0	0	0	0	0	37	0.09%
Saint Kitts and Nevis	1	2	1	0	0	0	0	0	0	0	0	4	0.01%
Saint Lucia	1	0	0	0	0	0	0	0	0	0	0	1	0.00%
Saint Vincent and the Grenadines	1	1	2	0	0	0	1	0	0	0	0	5	0.01%
Saudi Arabia	30	3	4	0	1	0	1	1	0	0	0	40	0.10%
Senegal	10	0	2	0	0	0	0	0	0	0	0	12	0.03%
Serbia	4	2	2	0	0	0	0	0	0	0	0	8	0.02%
Seychelles	2	1	0	0	0	0	0	0	0	0	0	3	0.01%
Sierra Leone	6	0	2	0	1	0	0	0	0	0	0	9	0.02%
Singapore	127	123	38	14	2	1	3	2	0	0	0	310	0.78%
Slovakia	7	1	2	0	0	0	0	0	0	0	0	10	0.03%
Slovenia	6	0	1	0	0	0	0	0	0	0	0	7	0.02%
Somalia	1	0	0	0	0	0	0	0	0	0	0	1	0.00%
South Africa	52	43	15	3	2	1	0	0	0	0	0	116	0.29%
South Sudan	2	0	0	0	0	0	0	0	0	0	0	2	0.01%
Spain	1013	248	183	22	18	5	1	2	2	1	1	1496	3.74%
Sri Lanka	3	1	1	0	0	0	0	0	0	0	0	5	0.01%
Sudan	2	0	0	0	0	0	0	0	0	0	0	2	0.01%
Sweden	635	217	105	6	9	4	3	2	1	0	0	982	2.46%
Switzerland	448	299	157	25	25	10	2	1	0	0	0	967	2.42%
Taiwan	263	52	1	10	1	1	4	6	0	0	2	340	0.08%
Tanzania	6	4	0	0	0	0	1	0	0	0	0	11	0.03%
Thailand	352	144	85	12	5	2	4	3	0	0	1	608	1.52%
Timor Leste	1	0	1	0	0	0	0	0	0	0	0	2	0.01%
Togo	7	0	0	0	0	0	0	0	0	0	0	7	0.02%
Tonga	2	0	0	0	0	0	0	0	0	0	0	2	0.01%
Trinidad and Tobago	1	2	0	0	0	0	0	0	0	0	0	3	0.01%
Tunisia	4	1	0	0	0	0	0	0	0	0	0	5	0.01%
Turkey	99	9	16	1	1	0	0	0	0	0	0	126	0.32%
Uganda	15	4	1	0	0	0	0	0	0	1	0	21	0.05%
Ukraine	14	9	1	0	2	0	0	0	0	0	0	26	0.07%
United Arab Emirates	419	231	87	10	4	1	1	3	0	0	0	756	1.89%
Uruguay	5	1	4	0	0	0	0	0	0	0	0	10	0.03%
Uzbekistan	1	0	0	0	0	0	0	0	0	0	0	1	0.00%
Venezuela	0	1	0	0	0	0	0	0	0	0	0	1	0.00%
Vietnam	430	55	37	2	0	1	2	1	0	0	0	528	1.32%
Zambia	4	1	2	0	0	0	0	0	0	0	0	7	0.02%
Zimbabwe	1	0	0	0	0	0	0	0	0	0	0	1	0.00%
TOTAL	23,139	9,059	5,730	892	616	224	147	85	26	19	48	39,985	
Percent	57.87%	22.66%	14.33%	2.23%	1.54%	0.56%	0.37%	0.21%	0.07%	0.05%	0.12%	100.00%	
