= 2020 Vermont Democratic presidential primary =

- March 3, 2020

24 delegates (16 pledged, 8 unpledged) to the Democratic National Convention The number of pledged delegates won is determined by the popular vote

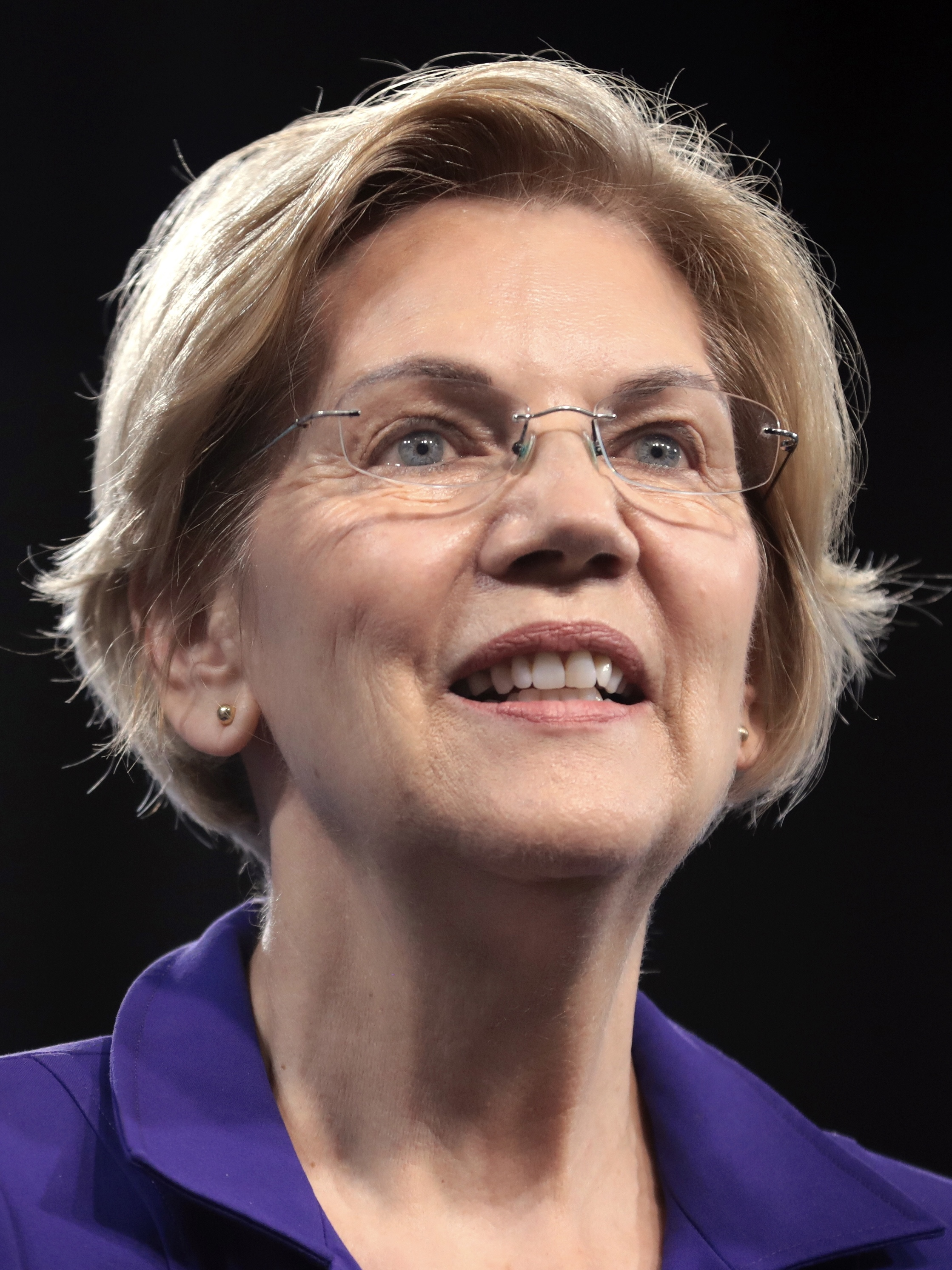

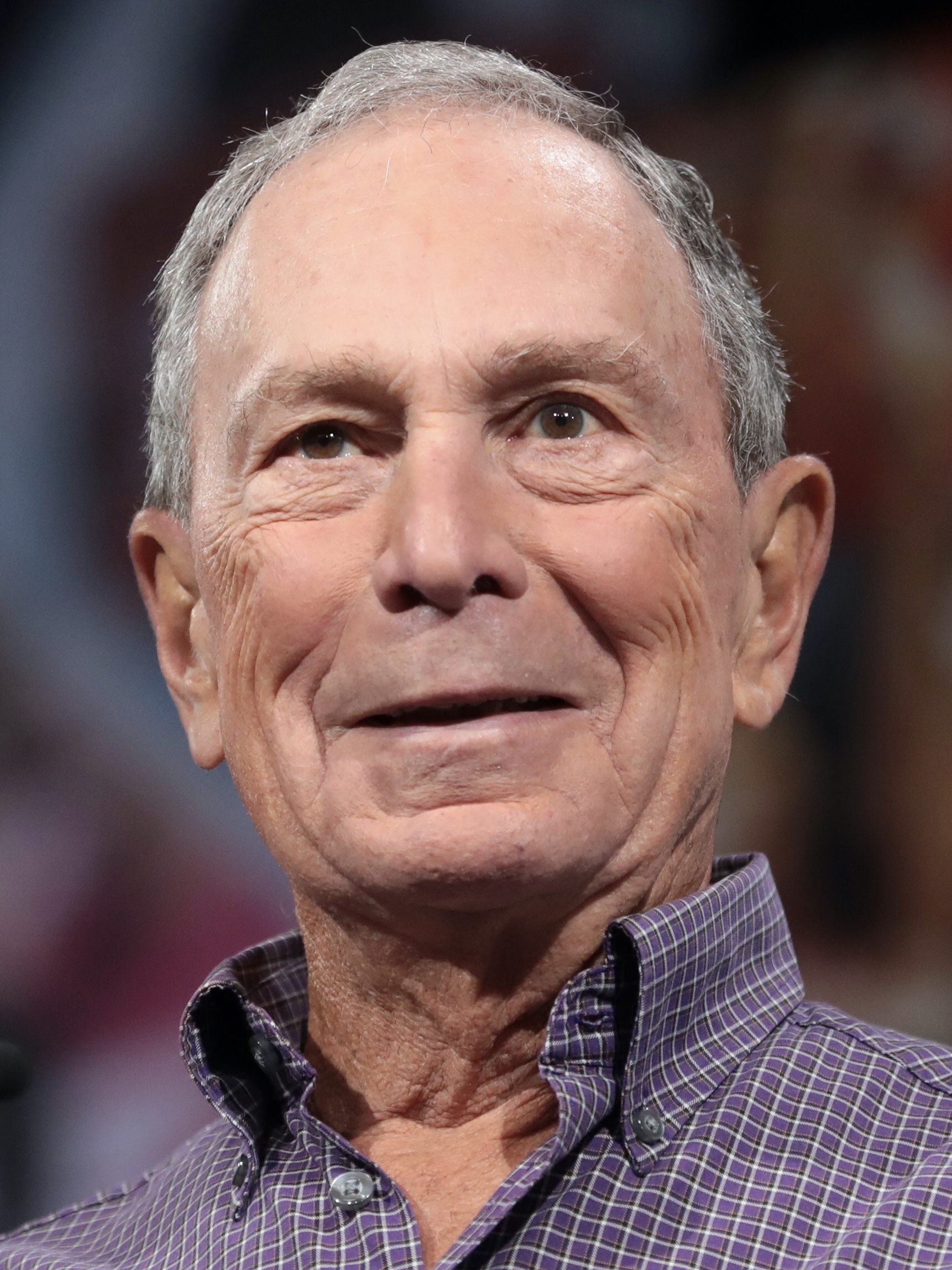
Candidate	Bernie Sanders	Joe Biden
Home state	Vermont	Delaware
Delegate count	11	5
Popular vote	79,921	34,669
Percentage	50.57%	21.94%
Candidate	Elizabeth Warren	Michael Bloomberg
Home state	Massachusetts	New York
Delegate count	0	0
Popular vote	19,785	14,828
Percentage	12.52%	9.38%
- Bernie Sanders Joe Biden

Pledged national convention delegates
Type	Del.
CD at-large	11
PLEO	2
At-large	3
Total pledged delegates	16

The 2020 Vermont Democratic presidential primary took place on March 3, 2020, as one of 15 contests scheduled on Super Tuesday in the Democratic Party primaries for the 2020 presidential election, following the South Carolina primary the weekend before. The Vermont primary was an open primary, with the state awarding 24 delegates towards the 2020 Democratic National Convention, of which 16 were pledged delegates allocated on the basis of the results of the primary.

While Senator Bernie Sanders won the primary in his home state by a landslide, gaining over 50% of the vote and 11 delegates, he underperformed compared to the 2016 primary, when he had won over 85% of the vote, allowing former Vice President Joe Biden to garner 5 delegates with a 22% second-place finish and add to the narrative of his surge following the South Carolina primary. Senator Elizabeth Warren and former New York City mayor Michael Bloomberg placed third and fourth respectively without any delegates.

== Procedure ==
Vermont was one of 14 states and one territory holding primaries on Super Tuesday. The Super Tuesday primary as part of Stage I on the primary timetable received no bonus delegates, in order to disperse the primaries between more different date clusters and keep too many states from hoarding on the first shared date or on a March date in general.

Early voting began on January 18, 2020, and took six days a week between then and election day. Regular voting took place throughout the state from 5:00 a.m. until 7:00 p.m. in much of the state, with some precincts closing as late as 10:00 p.m. In the open primary, candidates had to meet a threshold of 15 percent in order to be considered viable. The 16 pledged delegates to the 2020 Democratic National Convention were allocated proportionally on the basis of the results of the primary. Of these, 11 were formally allocated as district delegates on the basis of the statewide result (by definition coterminous with the state's sole congressional district) and another 2 were allocated to party leaders and elected officials (PLEO delegates), in addition to 3 at-large delegates, both also according to the statewide result.

After town caucuses on April 21, 2020, designated delegates for the state convention, the state convention was held on May 30, 2020, to nominate national convention district delegates, who in turn elected the 3 at-large and 2 pledged PLEO delegates for the Democratic National Convention at the national convention delegate meeting on June 13, 2020. The delegation also included 8 unpledged PLEO delegates: 4 members of the Democratic National Committee, 3 members from Congress (both senators, including formally Independent Bernie Sanders, and representative Peter Welch), and former DNC chair Howard Dean.

== Candidates ==
The following people have filed and qualified to be on the ballot in Vermont.

Running

- Joe Biden
- Michael Bloomberg
- Tulsi Gabbard
- Mark Greenstein (Note: Filed as Mark Stewart in the Vermont primary)
- Bernie Sanders
- Elizabeth Warren

Withdrawn

- Pete Buttigieg (Note: Candidate withdrew during absentee voting, shortly before the primary.)
- Julian Castro
- Amy Klobuchar
- Deval Patrick (Note: Candidate withdrew following the New Hampshire primary, when absentee voting had already begun.)
- Tom Steyer
- Marianne Williamson
- Andrew Yang

The name of early presidential candidate Michael Bennet, who had already dropped out of the race, was written in by three voters.

== Polling ==
Polling Aggregation
Source of poll aggregation	Date updated	Dates polled	Bernie Sanders	Elizabeth Warren	Joe Biden	Michael Bloomberg	Tulsi Gabbard	Other/ Undecided (Note: Calculated by taking the difference of 100% and all other candidates combined)
270 to Win	March 3, 2020	February 4–March 2, 2020	52.0%	14.0%	10.7%	10.3%	1.0%	12.0%
RealClear Politics	March 3, 2020	Insufficient recent polling to supply an average.						
FiveThirtyEight	March 3, 2020	until March 2, 2020 (Note: FiveThirtyEight aggregates polls with a trendline regression of polls rather than a strict average of recent polls.)	53.0%	14.2%	10.4%	8.9%	0.9%	12.6%
Average			52.5%	14.1%	10.55%	9.6%	0.95%	12.3%
Vermont primary results (March 3, 2020)			50.6%	12.5%	21.9%	9.4%	0.8%	4.8%

Tabulation of individual polls of the 2020 Vermont Democratic Primary
Poll source	Date(s) administered	Sample size (Note: Key: A – all adults RV – registered voters LV – likely voters V – unclear)	Margin of error	Joe Biden	Michael Bloomberg	Pete Buttigieg	Amy Klobuchar	Bernie Sanders	Elizabeth Warren	Other	Un- decided
	Mar 2, 2020	Klobuchar withdraws from the race									
Swayable	Mar 1–2, 2020	147 (LV)	± 11.0%	11%	16%	5%	2%	48%	17%	2% (Note: Gabbard with 0%; Steyer with no voters; "Other" with 2%)	–
Data for Progress	Feb 28–Mar 2, 2020	236 (LV)	± 6.9%	16%	8%	1%	–	57%	16%	2% (Note: Gabbard with 2%)	–
	Mar 1, 2020	Buttigieg withdraws from the race									
Vermont Public Radio	Feb 4–10, 2020	332 (LV)	± 4.0%	5%	7%	9%	4%	51%	13%	2% (Note: Yang with 2%; Gabbard with 1%)	7%

== Results ==
Popular vote share by county Sanders—40–50% Sanders—50–60%

2020 Vermont Democratic presidential primary
Candidate	Votes	%	Delegates
Bernie Sanders	79,921	50.57	11
Joe Biden	34,669	21.94	5
Elizabeth Warren	19,785	12.52	
Michael Bloomberg	14,828	9.38	
Pete Buttigieg (withdrawn)	3,709	2.35	
Amy Klobuchar (withdrawn)	1,991	1.26	
Tulsi Gabbard	1,303	0.82	
Andrew Yang (withdrawn)	591	0.37	
Tom Steyer (withdrawn)	202	0.13	
Deval Patrick (withdrawn)	137	0.09	
Marianne Williamson (withdrawn)	135	0.09	
Donald Trump (write-in Republican)	83	0.05	
Julian Castro (withdrawn)	52	0.03	
Hillary Clinton (write-in)	5	0.00	
Michael Bennet (write-in)	3	0.00	
Other candidates / Write-in	(Note: Including "Blank" (written in) with 8 votes; Ron Paul, Michelle Obama, John Edwards and two others with 2 votes; and 110 other write-ins with 1 vote)238	0.15	
Overvotes / Blank votes	(Note: 57 overvotes and 323 blank votes)380	0.24	
Total	158,032	100%	16

=== Results by county ===
2020 Vermont Democratic primary (results per county)
County	Bernie Sanders		Joe Biden		Elizabeth Warren		Michael Bloomberg		Pete Buttigieg		Amy Klobuchar		Tulsi Gabbard		Andrew Yang		Tom Steyer		Deval Patrick		Marianne Williamson		Mark Stewart		Julian Castro		Write-ins		Overvotes		Blank votes		Total votes cast
County	Votes	%	Votes	%	Votes	%	Votes	%	Votes	%	Votes	%	Votes	%	Votes	%	Votes	%	Votes	%	Votes	%	Votes	%	Votes	%	Votes	%	Votes	%	Votes	%	Total votes cast
Addison	5,069	48.61	2,256	21.63	1,581	15.16	974	9.34	227	2.18	117	1.12	67	0.64	34	0.33	15	0.14	7	0.07	6	0.06	11	0.11	5	0.05	17	0.16	7	0.07	35	0.34	10,428
Bennington	3,568	45.10	2,308	29.17	813	10.28	827	10.45	158	2.00	69	0.87	62	0.78	27	0.34	10	0.13	20	0.25	9	0.11	4	0.05	5	0.06	17	0.21	3	0.04	12	0.15	7,912
Caledonia	2,749	50.88	1,182	21.88	656	12.14	501	9.27	121	2.24	56	1.04	59	1.09	33	0.61	5	0.09	10	0.19	6	0.11	4	0.07	1	0.02	5	0.09	7	0.13	8	0.15	5,403
Chittenden	26,465	51.98	9,959	19.56	6,972	13.69	4,647	9.13	1,254	2.46	777	1.53	375	0.74	173	0.34	43	0.08	22	0.04	37	0.07	27	0.05	14	0.03	56	0.11	9	0.02	83	0.16	50,913
Essex	408	43.78	275	29.51	55	5.90	117	12.55	22	2.36	15	1.61	10	1.07	7	0.75	2	0.21	0	0	0	0	2	0.21	0	0	7	0.75	1	0.11	11	1.18	932
Franklin	3,962	50.14	1,919	24.28	527	6.67	1,021	12.92	194	2.46	81	1.03	57	0.72	47	0.59	7	0.09	8	0.10	14	0.18	7	0.09	4	0.05	25	0.32	3	0.04	26	0.33	7,902
Grand Isle	936	46.73	475	23.71	178	8.89	284	14.18	54	2.70	31	1.55	17	0.85	9	0.45	2	0.10	0	0	1	0.05	2	0.10	0	0	3	0.15	2	0.10	9	0.45	2,003
Lamoille	3,146	53.57	1,271	21.64	495	8.43	680	11.58	114	1.94	65	1.11	37	0.63	26	0.44	5	0.09	4	0.07	2	0.03	0	0	2	0.03	9	0.15	1	0.02	16	0.27	5,873
Orange	3,283	52.10	1,342	21.30	885	14.05	451	7.16	134	2.13	85	1.35	60	0.95	20	0.32	8	0.13	6	0.10	4	0.06	2	0.03	2	0.03	5	0.08	3	0.05	11	0.17	6,301
Orleans	1,985	51.53	899	23.34	341	8.85	439	11.40	67	1.74	37	0.96	35	0.91	14	0.36	5	0.13	4	0.10	7	0.18	5	0.13	1	0.03	1	0.03	2	0.05	10	0.26	3,852
Rutland	5,585	46.49	3,275	27.26	979	8.15	1,463	12.18	310	2.58	133	1.11	122	1.02	46	0.38	18	0.15	16	0.13	15	0.12	15	0.12	5	0.04	16	0.13	5	0.04	11	0.09	12,014
Washington	8,668	51.76	3,260	19.47	2,479	14.80	1,347	8.04	467	2.79	178	1.06	134	0.80	66	0.39	17	0.10	9	0.05	23	0.14	16	0.10	9	0.05	19	0.11	6	0.04	49	0.29	16,747
Windham	6,857	55.21	2,316	18.65	1,844	14.85	748	6.02	237	1.91	171	1.38	115	0.93	36	0.29	31	0.25	17	0.14	6	0.05	9	0.07	2	0.02	13	0.10	4	0.03	13	0.10	12,419
Windsor	7,240	47.22	3,932	25.64	1,980	12.91	1,329	8.67	350	2.28	176	1.15	153	1.00	53	0.35	34	0.22	14	0.09	5	0.03	6	0.04	2	0.01	26	0.17	4	0.03	29	0.19	15,333
Total	79,921	50.57	34,669	21.94	19,785	12.52	14,828	9.38	3,709	2.35	1,991	1.26	1,303	0.82	591	0.37	202	0.13	137	0.09	135	0.09	110	0.07	52	0.03	219	0.14	57	0.04	323	0.20	158,032

== See also ==
- 2020 Vermont Republican presidential primary
