= 2020 in United States politics and government =

Events in 2020 pertaining to politics and government in the United States.

== Events ==
=== January ===
- January 1
  - Crowds of demonstrators remain outside the Embassy of the United States and are smaller than on December 31, 2019, in Baghdad, Iraq. President Donald Trump sent 750 marines to guard the embassy and Tweeted a threat against Iran.
  - Recreational marijuana becomes legal in Illinois.
  - State laws on bail, the gig economy, minimum wages, data privacy, and red flag gun control take effect in several states, including California, New York, Colorado, Nevada, and Hawaii.
  - Several new federal regulations take effect in the US as of this date, including new regulations on retirement funds, new minimum wage rules, and new overtime rules.
  - Pete Buttigieg resigns as mayor of South Bend, Indiana. He is succeeded by James Mueller.
- January 2
  - Julian Castro drops out of the presidential race.
  - Secretary of State Mike Pompeo postpones his trip to Ukraine, Belarus, Kazakhstan, Uzbekistan, and Cyprus due to the situation in Iraq.
  - Virginia governor Ralph Northam (D) requests a bill to remove the Robert E. Lee statue from the U.S. Capitol building.
- January 3 – President Donald Trump approves the targeted killing of notorious Iranian general Qasem Soleimani and Iraqi paramilitary leader Abu Mahdi al-Muhandis in Baghdad, Iraq, without the consultation of Congress. In anticipation of a conflict between Iran and the U.S. results in World War III trending on Twitter. Supporters of Soleimani protested his killing while those who participated in the 2019 Iranian demonstrations praised it.
- January 4
  - Thousands of people in 70 cities across the country protest against a new war in the Middle East.
  - The White House officially notifies Congress about the airstrike that killed Qasem Soleimani, in accordance with the 1973 War Powers Resolution.
- January 5
  - The Iraqi parliament votes to expel U.S. troops from the country.
  - Al-Shabaab attacks a U.S. military base in Kenya. Three Americans are killed and two are injured.
  - 25,000 people march against Antisemitism in the United States in New York City.
  - Sixty people of Iranian descent, including American citizens, are detained at the Peace Arch Border Crossing in Washington.
- January 6
  - US House Speaker Nancy Pelosi announced she would introduce a resolution to limit Trump's ability to take actions against Iran.
  - Tennessee Congressman Phil Roe (R-1) is the 26th Republican to announce he will not seek reelection.
  - Julian Castro endorses Elizabeth Warren for president.
  - Former Rhode Island governor Lincoln Chafee announces his candidacy for president with the Libertarian Party.
  - Kelly Loeffler (R-GA) is sworn in as a United States Senator.
- January 7
  - California Congressman Duncan D. Hunter (R-50) sends a letter of resignation to House Speaker Nancy Pelosi, effective January 13.
  - Between six and nine missiles fired by the Iranian Revolutionary Guard Corps hit U.S. bases in Iraq, including Al Asad Airbase in the western part of the country. No casualties or damages are reported.
- January 8 – Maricopa County, Arizona, Assessor Paul Petersen (R) resigns after being indicted for his alleged involvement in human-trafficking.
- January 9
  - Facebook reiterates that it will allow politicians to lie on political ads, although users are free to block them.
  - The New York City Bar Association asks Congress to investigate Attorney General William Barr for political bias and ethics violations.
  - Three Republicans join House Democrats and one Independent in voting 224–194 in favor of the Iran War Powers Resolution sponsored by Congresswoman Elissa Slotkin (D-MI-8).
  - Tom Steyer will join Joe Biden, Bernie Sanders, Elizabeth Warren, Pete Buttigieg, Amy Klobuchar, and Andrew Yang in the 7th Democratic presidential debate on January 14.
  - Anti-war protests in 370 U.S. cities.
  - Staff for the Andrew Yang 2020 presidential campaign unionize. Workers for Buttigieg, Warren, Sanders, and Biden are also unionized.
- January 10 – Marianne Williamson announces she has ended her presidential campaign.
- January 11
  - Two American soldiers are killed and two wounded by an improvised explosive device (IED) in southern Afghanistan.
  - Independent Congressman Justin Amash (MI-3) accuses President Trump of selling U.S. troops to after Trump tells Laura Ingraham that Saudi Arabia deposited $1 billion in a bank account in return for an increased military presence.
- January 12 – A report by the Texas Department of Public Safety warns that "involuntary celibates" (Incels) are a domestic terrorism threat.
- January 13
  - Senator Cory Booker drops out of the 2020 presidential campaign. He will run for reelection to the U.S. Senate instead.
  - All 16 Roman Catholic bishops in Texas and two large newspapers, The Dallas Morning News and the Houston Chronicle condemn Texas governor Greg Abbott's decision to bar refugees from settling in the state.
- January 14
  - Two white women and four white men participate in the 7th Democratic Party presidential debate in Des Moines, Iowa.
- January 15
  - U.S. Speaker of the United States House of Representatives Nancy Pelosi names the seven managers of the impeachment team and the House votes to send its impeachment resolutions to the Senate for a trial of President Donald Trump.
  - President Trump signs an initial trade deal with China.
  - Whitefield Academy in Kentucky expels a 15-year-old girl for wearing a rainbow sweater and blowing out candles on a rainbow birthday cake in her home.
  - Virginia becomes the 38th state to ratify the Equal Rights Amendment. It is unclear if, or when, it will become law.
- January 16
  - Chief Justice of the United States John Roberts and 99 senators are sworn in at the Trump impeachment trial. Senator Jim Inhofe (R-OK) misses the vote because he is in Oklahoma with a sick relative.
  - The U.S. Senate ratifies the United States–Mexico–Canada Agreement (USMCA) on a vote of 89 to 10. Environmentalists argue the treaty does not go far enough.
  - Congresswoman Ayanna Pressley (D-MA-7) reveals she has Alopecia areata, also called "spot baldness".
- January 17
  - The National Archives acknowledges that it altered photographs of the 2017 Women's March on Washington, blurring the word Trump in a sign that reads, "God Hates Trump" and another that reads, "Trump & GOP – Hands Off Women".
  - The Federal Election Commission (FEC) grants Michael Bloomberg a 45-day extension to file his financial disclosure form, until after the Super Tuesday primaries.
- January 20 – Martin Luther King Jr. Day (Federal holiday)
  - Most Democratic presidential candidates marched together in Columbia, South Carolina. Then they went to Des Moines, Iowa for the "Brown and Black Forum."
  - 22,000 people, many heavily armed, participated in the Richmond, Virginia gun rally.
- January 20 – 24: World Economic Forum in Davos, Switzerland. Ivanka Trump, Jared Kushner, and several cabinet members will be in the U.S. delegation. President Trump talks about the U.S. economy and warns about fearmongering on climate change.
- January 21 – In an interview with The Hollywood Reporter, Hillary Clinton says "nobody likes" Senator Bernie Sanders and refuses to promise to support him if he wins the 2020 Democratic Presidential Nomination.
- January 22
  - Tulsi Gabbard sues Hillary Clinton for $50 million for calling her a "Russian asset".
  - On the second day of the Donald Trump impeachment trial, Senate Republicans complain that House Democrats have not introduced any new evidence one day after voting against allowing new evidence.
- January 23
  - Prince Charles ignores and walks past U.S. Vice President Mike Pence without shaking his hand at the World Holocaust Forum in Jerusalem.
  - The U.S. imposes new visa rules limiting entry by pregnant women.
- January 24 – Congressman Adam Schiff (D-CA-28) concludes the opening arguments in the impeachment trial of Donald Trump by calling upon Senators to show "moral courage" in voting to call witnesses.
- January 26 – Taking his cue from Fox News personality Mark Levin, President Trump threatens to eliminate funding for National Public Radio (npr) two days after Secretary of State Mike Pompeo lost his temper after an interview with reporter Mary Louise Kelly.
- January 27
  - The US Army announces that its Artificial Intelligence Task Force (AITF) has developed a new Artificial Intelligence (AI) system, Aided Threat Recognition from Mobile Cooperative and Autonomous Sensors (ATR-MCAS) that may transform future operations.
  - Dr. Laura Hawks of Harvard University publishes a study in the JAMA Internal Medicine that shows that even many people who have private insurance cannot afford to pay for hospital care and doctor's visits.
- January 28 – The defense wraps up in the Impeachment trial of Donald Trump.
- January 31
  - Senate rejects calling witnesses in Trump impeachment trial.
  - The Trump administration restricts entry into the United States from the People's Republic of China in an attempt to slow the Novel Coronavirus.
  - The Trump Administration partially bans immigration from Kyrgyzstan, Myanmar, Eritrea, Nigeria, Sudan, and Tanzania.
  - The Trump Administration ends the ban on land mines in South Korea.
  - Heavily armed gunmen, some with masks, take over the Capitol in Frankfort, Kentucky in gun rally.
  - Former Congressman John Delaney drops out of the 2020 presidential race.

=== February ===
- February 1
  - Palestinian leader Mahmoud Abbas threatens to cut security ties to the United States and Israel.
  - The U.S. Secretary of State says the United States can supply Belarus with 100% of its needed oil and gas after Russia cuts its supply.
  - Republican Montana Representative Rodney Garcia says socialists should be shot or jailed.
- February 2 – Former New York Mayor Michael Bloomberg responds to President Donald Trump's Twitter attacks during Super Bowl LIV. Trump called Bloomberg "Mini Mike" and attacked his candidacy for president after seeing a series of Trump attack ads put out by the Bloomberg campaign; the former mayor responded with, "I stand twice as tall as he does on the stage, the stage that matters."
- February 3
  - 2020 Iowa Democratic caucuses: The Democratic caucus results are delayed thirteen hours due to a snafu with a vote-counting app.
    - With 99.94% of precincts reporting, the results are: Buttigieg, 26.1% (14 delegates); Sanders 26.1% (12 delegates); Warren 18.0% (8 delegates); Biden 15.8% (6 delegates); and Klobuchar 12.3% (1 delegate).
  - 2020 Iowa Republican caucuses: Donald Trump 97%, Joe Walsh 1.4%, Bill Weld 1.2% with 8% of the votes counted.
    - Former Massachusetts governor Bill Weld gets one delegate and Trump gets 39 delegates to the 2020 Republican National Convention.
- February 4 – President Donald Trump delivers his third State of the Union address. The speech has partisan overturns, as Trump refuses to shake Speaker Nancy Pelosi's hand and she tears up the text in disgust at the end.
- February 5 — the US Senate voted on whether or not to convict the president on the charges and evidence as they were presented and debated upon. The senators voted 52 to 48 to find President Trump not guilty on the charge of abuse of power (all 45 Democrats, independent senators Bernie Sanders and Angus King, and Republican senator Romney voted guilty). They voted 53 to 47, in a party-line vote, to find him not guilty on the charge of obstruction of Congress.
- February 7
  - U.S. Army Lt. Col. Alexander Vindman and Ambassador Gordon Sondland are fired in retaliation for testifying at the impeachment inquiry against Donald Trump. Vindman's twin brother, Lt. Col. Eugene Vindman, was also fired.
  - Former Illinois Congressman Joe Walsh drops out of the Republican presidential primaries.
- February 10
  - New York Congressman Jerry Nadler (D-NY) demands that Attorney General Bill Barr explain the Justice Department's special new policy for investigating allegations of corruption based on evidence provided by attorney Rudy Giuliani related to Ukraine. The existence of the non-standard channel of investigation was first revealed by Senator Lindsey Graham (R-SC) on February 9.
  - Construction begins of the border wall in the Organ Pipe Cactus National Monument, destroying Native American burial sites belong to the Tohono Oʼodham Nation and threatening severe environmental damage.
- February 11
  - 2020 New Hampshire Democratic primary
    - 100% of precincts reporting: Sanders 25.7% (9 delegates), Buttigieg 24.4% (9 delegates), Klobuchar 19.8% (6 delegates), Warren 9.2%, Biden 8.4%
  - Andrew Yang and Michael Bennet suspend their presidential campaigns. Deval Patrick suspend his campaign on February 12.
  - Four federal prosecutors resign in response to the politicization of the United States Department of Justice in the Roger Stone case.
- February 13
  - Attorney General William Barr says that Trump tweets make it impossible for him to do his job.
  - Eight Republicans join Senate Democrats in voting 55–45 in favor of the Iran War Powers Resolution
- February 14 – Justice Department decides not to prosecute former FBI director Andrew McCabe.
- February 16 – Ivanka Trump praises Saudi Arabia and other Mideast countries for the advances they have made on women's rights.
- February 17 – 1,100 former DOJ employees call on Attorney General Bill Barr to step down and for current employees to speak up against politicization of the department.
- February 18
  - Donald Trump commutes former Illinois governor Rod Blagojevich's 14-year sentence to seven years. He pardons former New York police commissioner Bernard Kerik and former San Francisco 49ers owner Edward J. DeBartolo Jr.
  - Sarah Miyazawa LaFleur of MM LaFleur clothing says the company will lend free clothing to any woman running for office.
  - The lawyer for Julian Assange, founder of WikiLeaks, claims that former Congressman Dana Rohrabacher (R-CA) offered Assange a pardon in 2017 in exchange for denying Russian involvement in the DNC leak. In a February 20 interview with Yahoo! News, Rohrabacher admitted that he had offered a pardon to Assange.
- February 19 – President Trump replaces acting director of national intelligence Joseph Maguire with the inexperienced ambassador to Germany Richard Grenell after Maguire's office tells the United States House Permanent Select Committee on Intelligence that Russia intends to interfere in the 2020 elections.
- February 22 – 2020 Nevada Democratic caucuses
- February 26 – Donald Trump files a lawsuit against The New York Times for libel for saying Russia supported his 2016 campaign.
- February 28 – At a political rally in North Charleston, South Carolina, Donald Trump accuses the Democrats of politicizing the coronavirus and says the media are perpetuating a "hoax" as new outbreaks are reported in the United States, Iran, South Korea, and Italy.
- February 29
  - The United States and the Taliban sign an agreement that may lead to the end of the war in Afghanistan.
  - Joe Biden is declared the winner of the 2020 South Carolina Democratic primary.

=== March ===
- March 1
  - Pete Buttigieg withdraws from the 2020 Democratic Party presidential primaries.
  - Joe Biden says he will insist that the 2020 Democratic presidential nominee has a majority, not a plurality, of votes at the DNC national convention.
  - U.S. District Judge Randolph Moss rules that Ken Cuccinelli was not eligible to serve as acting director of the United States Citizenship and Immigration Services and suspends two policies Cuccinelli implemented while leading the agency.
- March 2
  - Amy Klobuchar suspends her 2020 presidential campaign and endorses the Joe Biden 2020 presidential campaign.
  - Michael Bloomberg pledges carte blanche support for Israel in a speech before AIPAC.
  - A report by the British newspaper The Guardian shows that Texas leads the South in closing down voting places, making it more difficult for Democratic-leaning African-Americans and Latinos to vote.
- March 3
  - Super Tuesday presidential primary elections
    - Joe Biden wins Alabama, Massachusetts, Minnesota, North Carolina, Oklahoma, Tennessee, Texas, and Virginia. Preliminary results place him second in California. He leads with 453 pledged delegates.
    - Bernie Sanders wins Colorado, Utah, and Vermont and leads in California. He is in second place with 382 pledged delegates.
    - Elizabeth Warren fails to win any states, but she is in third place with 50 pledged delegates.
    - Michael Bloomberg has 44 delegates, including four from American Samoa. On March 4 he drops out and endorses Biden.
    - Tulsi Gabbard has two delegates from American Samoa.
  - The Texas Democratic primary for the Railroad Commission of Texas is expected to be a major test on climate change. No candidate wins the primary, so there will be a runoff on May 26.
  - During a meeting of the House Ways and Means Committee, Congressman Bill Pascrell (D-NJ) accuses Treasury Secretary Steven Mnuchin of lying and breaking the law by hiding President Trump's tax returns.
- March 4 – 2020 Alabama Republican primary: In the presidential primary, Donald Trump gets 96% of the vote and all 50 delegates; Bill Weld gets 1.5% of the votes. Former attorney general and senator Jeff Sessions will face football coach Tommy Tuberville in a runoff election for the Republican Senate nomination on March 31.
- March 5
  - The Elizabeth Warren 2020 presidential campaign ends after a dismal showing on Super Tuesday.
  - The Attorney General of New York warns televangelist Jim Bakker against profiting off an unproven cure for the novel coronavirus.
  - Former Congressman Aaron Schock (R-IL), a leading anti-LGBTQ voice while in Congress, comes out as gay.
- March 6
  - The Donald Trump 2020 presidential campaign sues CNN for libel.
  - After Vice President Mike Pence praised Washington Governor Jay Inslee for his efforts to control the outbreak of the coronavirus, the Trump called Inslee "a snake."
  - The Tulsi Gabbard 2020 presidential campaign appeals to Joe Biden and Bernie Sanders to support her participation in the March 15 presidential debate after the DNC changes its rules to deny her a spot.
  - Five senior members of the Atomwaffen Division right-wing hate group are charged with federal crimes in two cases across four states.
- March 7 – The Trump administration ignores politically inconvenient CDC recommendation that elderly people should be advised to avoid commercial air flights in response to the coronavirus. Fox News helps Donald Trump spread false information about the virus.
- March 9
  - Former Wells Fargo Chairwoman Elizabeth “Betsy” Duke and James Quigley resign three days before House Committee on Financial Services hearings on the Wells Fargo account fraud scandal.
  - President Trump proposes a payroll tax (FICA) cut to stimulate the economy. Democrats oppose the idea, proposing paid sick leave and infrastructure spending instead.
- March 10 – Six Democratic primaries and caucuses
  - Kansas City mayor Quinton Lucas (D) says he was not allowed to vote in the Missouri Democratic primary at his regular polling place.
  - Joe Biden defeats Bernie Sanders in the Michigan Democratic primary.
- March 12 – Two Americans and a British soldier are killed during a rocket attack in Iraq.
- March 13
  - The Pentagon announces it will keep two aircraft carrier groups in the Persian Gulf after carrying out airstrikes against five depots for Iranian rockets in Iraq.
  - Donald Trump declares an emergency and the House approves a $50 billion package to address the economic effects of the COVID-19 pandemic in the United States.
- March 15
  - Joe Biden and Bernie Sanders debate; Biden promises to choose a female running mate.
  - Donald Trump says he is considering a full pardon for Michael Flynn.
- March 16
  - Springfield, Missouri gunman kills five, including a police officer.
  - Ohio Governor Mike DeWine (R) postpones the primary elections until June 2. This comes one day after a judge said he could not do so. Kentucky then postponed its primary for five weeks.
  - A Lebanese military court releases Amer Fakhoury, a Lebanese-American who was accused of aiding an Israeli-backed militia group. The judge appeals the verdict.
  - Los Angeles releases 600 inmates to prevent the spread of coronavirus.
  - Congressman Louie Gohmert (R-TX) holds up the bipartisan coronavirus relief bill that provides for free testing; paid sick, family, and medical leave; strengthen unemployment insurance and food security; it increases funds for Medicaid. Gohmert's objections are purely technical.
- March 17
  - Democratic primaries in Arizona, Florida, and Illinois. Biden wins all three states. Biden has 1,180 delegates and Sanders has 885.
    - Progressive Marie Newman defeats incumbent conservative Congressman Dan Lipinski (D-IL) in the 2020 Illinois Democratic primary.
  - Mark Andrew Green, the head of the United States Agency for International Development (USAID), resigns. Green enjoyed bipartisan support.
  - The Justice Department quietly drops charges against Russian business charged in the Report on the Investigation into Russian Interference in the 2016 Presidential Election.
- March 18 – Tulsi Gabbard drops out of the presidential race and endorses Joe Biden.
- March 19 – Muhammad Masood, 28, a Pakistani doctor working in the U.S., is arrested on terrorism charges in Minnesota.
- March 20
  - Secretary of State Mike Pompeo criticized the Chinese Communist Party for delaying information about the coronavirus. A Chinese spokesperson shot back, noting that China had notified the U.S. government about the outbreak on January 3, 2020, but that the U.S. Embassy in Wuhan did not notify its residents until January 15.
  - Senator Richard Burr (R-NC) faces calls for his resignation after allegations that he used insider information about the coronavirus pandemic to make millions off the stock market. Senators Dianne Feinstein (D-CA), Kelly Loeffler (R-GA), and James Inhofe (R-OK) also made questionable deals. Burr asks for an ethics review.
  - The Pentagon successfully tests a Mach 5 hypersonic missile.
  - The Michael Bloomberg 2020 presidential campaign transfers $18 million to the Democratic National Committee.
- March 23 – Senate colleagues Martha McSally (R-AZ) and Kyrsten Sinema (D-AZ) call Rand Paul "absolutely irresponsible" for going out in public and using the Senate pool and gym after testing positive for COVID-19.
- March 24
  - Donald Trump easily fields softball questions in a virtual town hall meeting on Fox News. He compares the coronavirus pandemic to a bad seasonal flu epidemic, promises to help Boeing, and calls for the country to go back to work by Easter.
  - A congressionally mandated commission recommends women should be eligible for the draft.
  - The $2 trillion rescue package worked out by Secretary of the Treasury Steve Mnuchin, Senate Majority Leader Mitch McConnell, and Senate Minority Leader Chuck Schumer is held up by Republican Senators Lindsey Graham (R-SC), Tim Scott (R-SC), Ben Sasse (R-Ne), and Rick Scott (R-FL) who fear it is too generous for American workers. Independent Bernie Sanders (I-VT) says he will vote against the bill unless the Republicans drop their demands. The bill passed 96–0.
  - Joe Biden calls for an end to Democratic debates.
  - The FBI kills a suspected white supremacist just before he detonated a car bomb outside a medical center in Kansas City, Missouri. 36-year-old Timothy Wilson “espoused white supremacist ideology” and “made a threat that if any agent attempted to [search his property] they should ‘bring a lot of body bags,” said the FBI alert that circulated on March 25.
- March 25 – A 17-year-old boy in Lancaster, California died of COVID-19 after being denied health care because he did not have health insurance.
- March 26 – The Green Party of the United States says the COVID-19 pandemic will keep third parties off the ballot in 2020 unless petitioning requirements are relaxed.
- March 27 – The House approves the $2 trillion stimulus bill previously approved by the Senate. Pelosi says more money will be needed.

=== April ===
- April 1 – In an interview on The View, Whoopi Goldberg asks Bernie Sanders why he is continuing his campaign for president. Sanders replies, "We are assessing our campaign, as a matter of fact, where we want to go forward. But people in a democracy do have a right to vote."
- April 3
  - Democratic Senate leader Chuck Schumer says more money for the unemployed will probably be necessary after a record 6.6 million people filed for unemployment benefits last week.
  - In an interview on CNBC, House Speaker Nancy Pelosi pushes an infrastructure proposal but says that clean water and broadband provisions will probably have to wait in favor of more funding for direct payments to individuals, unemployment insurance, small-business loans, and protective equipment for doctors and other medical professionals.
  - President Trump nominates Justin Walker, 37, who was approved just five months ago to a federal judgeship in Kentucky despite having no experience and receiving a “not qualified” rating from the American Bar Association, to a seat on the United States Court of Appeals for the District of Columbia Circuit.
  - Donald Trump fires Michael Atkinson, who was the Inspector General of the Intelligence Community who revealed the Ukraine whistleblower complaint that led to Trump's impeachment. Thomas Monheim, a career intelligence professional, will serve as acting inspector general.
- April 4 – Wyoming Democratic caucuses and Alaska Democratic primary changed from in-person to a mail-in process
- April 6 – The Supreme Court turns down an appeal from a Catholic church in Washington, DC, that would have allowed them to place religious ads on public buses.
- April 7 – The Wisconsin primaries goes ahead as scheduled but absentee voting is extended until April 13. Nineteen people were infected with COVID-19.
- April 8 – Bernie Sanders drops out of the presidential race.
- April 12 – Virginia Governor Ralph Northam signs new measures into law aimed at expanding access to voting in the commonwealth. Election Day is made a national holiday, early voting is extended to 45 days, and the requirement that a photo ID is shown before voting is eliminated.
- April 13
  - Donald Trump claims that he has exclusive authority to end restrictions as the COVID-19 outbreak eases. Joe Biden attacked Trump's comments, tweeting "I am not running for office to be King of America. I respect the Constitution. I've read the Constitution. I've sworn an oath to it many times." Federal legislators of both parties pushed back against Trump's comments.
  - Bernie Sanders endorses Joe Biden for president.
- April 14
  - Former President Barack Obama formally endorses Joe Biden for president.
  - Liberal Jill Karofsky defeats conservative incumbent Daniel Kelly as Justice of the Wisconsin Supreme Court.
- April 15
  - A Texas judge rules that all citizens of Texas are eligible to request mail-in ballots based on disability if they fear contracting COVID-19 by voting in person. Republican lawmakers oppose the ruling and plan to appeal.
  - The Georgia election board has approved drop-boxes for the primary election in June. Absentee voters will have the option of using the drop-boxes rather than paying for postage. Individual counties will have the option to use the drop-boxes or not, and they will have to pay for them.
  - The Republican-controlled Kentucky General Assembly overrides Governor Andy Beshear's veto of a bill requiring government-issued voter-ID in order to participate in the November 3 elections. State offices that issue such IDs are closed.
- April 16 – A report published by Vice Media asserts that former Michigan governor Rick Snyder covered up and lied about the Flint water crisis. VICE notes that the Michigan statute of limitations runs out on April 25, 2020, for new felony misconduct-in-office charges related to the water crisis to be filed, although the Michigan AG's office disputes this deadline.
- April 19 – Republicans are pushing an anti-Chinese narrative about the origins of the coronavirus outbreak, despite warnings from the FBI and Asian-American leaders about xenophobia and racism. Dr. Anthony Fauci, of the White House Coronavirus Task Force has denied the theory of a laboratory origin of the virus, and the Chairman of the Joint Chiefs of Staff, General Mark Milley, said that the “weight of evidence” points toward natural origins.
- April 20
  - The Supreme Court rules 6-3 that criminal convictions require unanimous votes, rather than the 10–2 vote allowed in Louisiana and Oregon.
  - Big restaurant chains are getting millions in subsidies earmarked for small businesses so long as they do not have 500 employees in a single location.
  - Trump tweets that he intends to sign an executive order suspending all immigration to the U.S.
  - The United States Court of Appeals for the Fifth Circuit upholds the Texas ban on most abortions.
- April 21 – Authorities in Milwaukee link seven COVID-19 infections to the April 7 election.
- April 22 – Dr. Rick Bright, the head of the federal agency charged with overseeing the production of a vaccine to fight the novel coronavirus pandemic, says he was transferred "in response to my insistence that the government invest the billions of dollars allocated by Congress to address the COVID-19 pandemic into safe and scientifically vetted solutions, and not in drugs, vaccines and other technologies that lack scientific merit."
- April 23
  - The State Department announces a $12.1 million economic aid package for Greenland aimed at strengthening mutual ties and boosting a renewed U.S. push for a greater military presence in the Arctic.
  - SCOTUS rules 6-3 that dumping polluted water into the ground does not make it miraculously clean and is still a violation of the Clean Water Act.
- April 27 – In a 5–4 decision, SCOTUS dismisses a case brought by gun-rights advocates in New York City that would prohibit transporting guns outside the city.
- April 29 – The United States Court of Appeals for the Tenth Circuit rules that Kansas cannot require voters to show proof of citizenship when they register.

=== May ===
- May 1
  - The White House blocks testimony by Dr. Anthony Fauci before the House Appropriations Subcommittee on Labor, Health and Human Services, Education, and Related Agencies. Fauci is expected to testify before the Senate Committee on Health, Education, Labor, and Pensions.
  - Christi Grimm is fired from her position as Inspector General of Health and Human Services.
- May 2 – Kansas Democratic primary changed from in-person to a mail-in process Biden wins 29 delegates and Sanders 10. Biden now has 1,424 delegates of the 1,991 needed for the nomination.
- May 4 – Trump celebrates World Press Freedom Day by blasting NBC's Joe Scarborough and Fox News opinion polling.
- May 6 – Trump vetoes the Iran War Powers Resolution.
- May 7 – The Senate fails to override the veto of the Iran War Powers Resolution by a vote of 49–44.
- May 12
  - West Virginia Democratic primary
  - Republican Mike Garcia wins California's 25th congressional district special election flipping the seat formerly held by Katie Hill (D).
- May 13 – Utah decriminalizes polygamy.
- May 16
  - Hundreds march in Glynn County, Georgia demanding justice for the February 23 murder of Ahmaud Arbery, 25.
  - Robert Tesh, 32, is arrested for terrorism after making “credible threats” to kill Governor Gretchen Whitmer of Michigan and the state attorney general, Dana Nessel.
  - Congressman Justin Amash (MI-I) ends his campaign for the Libertarian Party presidential nomination.
- May 18 – Rebekah Jones, the architect and manager of Florida's COVID-19 dashboard, says she was removed from her post after she would not censor data. The Office of Inspector General later found her claims to be unsubstantiated or unfounded; those she accused were exonerated of any misconduct.
- May 19
  - Rescheduled 2020 Georgia Democratic primary
  - Mail-in referendum on proposed "homeless tax" in Metro (Portland, Oregon) Voters appeared to be approving taxes on personal income and business profits that would raise $2.5 billion over a decade to fight homelessness.
  - Jo Rae Perkins, a member of the far-right conspiracy group QAnon, wins the Republican nomination for U.S. Senate in Oregon.
  - Secretary of Education Betsy DeVos admits that she is diverting funds intended to help low-income students at public schools to private schools even if they do not serve low-income students.
- May 20 – President Trump threatens to halt federal funding to Michigan and Nevada over the distribution of absentee ballots.
- May 22 – President Trump fires the acting Inspector General (IG) of the United States Department of Transportation (DOT) Mitch Behm and appoints Howard “Skip” Elliott. Behm was investigating allegations that Secretary Elaine Chao gave her husband's Kentucky constituents special treatment and helped steer millions of federal dollars to the state as he is facing low approval ratings and a tough reelection bid.
- May 23 – Hawaii presidential primary: Won by Joe Biden with 63% of vote
- May 24 – Vice President Mike Pence sets off a diplomatic row by questioning Australia's involvement in China's Belt and Road Initiative.
- May 25 – Trump threatens to move the 2020 Republican National Convention from Charlotte, NC, if the governor cannot guarantee large crowds will be allowed to attend.
- May 26
  - For the first time, Twitter labels a Trump tweet "misleading." Trump threatens censorship in retaliation.
  - Police dressed in riot gear use tear gas, rubber bullets, and stun grenades to disperse crowds protesting the murder of George Floyd by police officers in Minneapolis, Minnesota.
- May 27 – The Justice Department drops insider trader investigations against three U.S. Senators, but continues the investigation of Senator Richard Burr (R-NC).
- May 29 – Donald Trumps withdraws the United States from the World Health Organization (WHO).
- May 31
  - George Floyd protests: Police in Nashville, Tennessee, arrest a 25-year-old white man suspected of setting the city's historic courthouse on fire during protests against the murder of George Floyd.
  - AG William Barr is accused of politicizing the Department of Justice for firing Joseph D. Brown, the United States District Court for the Eastern District of Texas, for pursuing possible criminal charges against Walmart in relation to the opioid crisis.

=== June ===
- June 1 – George Floyd protests: President Trump tells governors they need to "dominate" streets in response to protests.
- June 2 – Elections in eleven states
  - District of Columbia: Voters face long lines and delays as fewer polling places are available and social distancing is enforced.
  - Indiana rescheduled from May 5 Conservative Club for Growth member Victoria Spartz wins the Republican nomination for Indiana's 5th congressional district.
  - Iowa: Congressman Steve King (R-IO-), known for his racism and anti-immigrant bigotry, loses the Republican primary for Iowa's 4th congressional district to Randy Feenstra. Democrats nominate Theresa Greenfield to run for the 2020 United States Senate election in Iowa against Joni Ernst (R).
  - Maryland rescheduled from April 28 Former head of the NAACP Kweisi Mfume wins the Democratic nomination for Maryland's 7th congressional district.
  - Missouri: Ferguson, Missouri, home to the late Michael Brown Jr., elects its first black and first female mayor, Ella Jones.
  - Montana: Republican Congressman Greg Gianforte and Democrat Mike Cooney will run in the November election for Montana governor after a mail-in primary that saw huge voter participation. Gianforte is best known for beating up a reporter in 2017.
  - New Mexico: Teresa Leger Fernandez, an attorney, defeats former CIA agent Valerie Plame for the Democratic nomination in New Mexico's 3rd congressional district. Liberals dominate elections for the New Mexico Senate. Conservative Native American Yvette Herrell wins the Republican nomination for New Mexico's 2nd congressional district.
  - Ohio, originally scheduled for March 17
  - Pennsylvania A decision by the Supreme Court of Pennsylvania not to extend the vote-by-mail deadline is expected to lower Asian-American participation since many of them require translation services. Voters face long lines at the polls.
  - Rhode Island: Biden and Trump win their respective primaries.
- June 2 – George Floyd protests
  - Charges against Officer Derek Chauvin are upgraded to second-degree unintentional murder and the other three officers involved are charged with aiding and abetting in the death of 46-year-old Floyd.
  - DoD Secretary Mark Esper rejects using the military to quell protests.
  - Evangelical leader Pat Robertson opens his nightly The 700 Club television show by saying the political moment in the U.S. now calls for compassion and reassurance.
- June 6 – Joe Biden wins all seven delegates in the 2020 U.S. Virgin Islands caucuses.
- June 8
  - List of George Floyd protests in the United States: Over 10,000 people have been arrested in protests, many of them non-violent.
  - Before unveiling a sweeping overhaul of police reforms, House and Senate Democrats kneel in silence at the Capitol's Emancipation Hall, reading the names of George Floyd and others killed during police interactions.
  - The National Bureau of Economic Research (NBER) says the United States is in an economic recession after 128 months of economic growth. GDP dropped by 5 percent in the first quarter of 2020.
- June 9 – Elections
  - Georgia primaries: Minority areas in Fulton, DeKalb and Gwinnett counties experience long lines and voting machine failures; Secretary of State Brad Raffensperger (R) calls the situation ″unacceptable.″ Jon Ossoff leads in the race for the Democratic Senate nomination with 48% of the vote but needs 50% to avoid a runoff. Absentee voting increased from 40,000 in a typical election to 1.2 million.
  - South Carolina primaries: Conservative Nancy Mace, the first female graduate of The Citadel wins the Republican nomination to face Democrat Joe Cunningham in South Carolina's 1st congressional district.
  - West Virginia: The state senate president Mitch Carmichael (R) loses the Republican primary to Amy Nicole Grady, a teacher who campaigned for better teacher salaries. Rosemary Ketchem becomes the state's first openly transgender person elected to political office by winning in Wheeling.
- June 9 – Statues of Christopher Columbus are beheaded in Boston, Massachusetts, and knocked over in Richmond, Virginia in support of Native American rights.
- June 10 – NASCAR bans Confederate flags at its events.
- June 12
  - Governors of Iowa and New York sign police reform legislation.
  - Boston shifts $3 million from the Boston Police Department to community programs.
  - A Tennessee House committee votes against removing a bronze bust of Nathan Bedford Forrest, saying racists would be offended if it were removed. The mayor of Albany, New York signs an order to remove a statue of slave-owner Philip Schuyler that stands in front of city hall. A statue of Jefferson Davis is removed from the Kentucky State Capitol rotunda.
  - The Minneapolis City Council approves a resolution to pursue a community-led public safety system to replace the police department following the murder of George Floyd.
- June 13 – Virginia Republican convention: Freshman Denver Riggleman (R-Va.) loses the nomination in Virginia's 5th congressional district amidst charges of voter fraud.
- June 15 – Two resignations of top officials at Voice of America (VOA) are followed by the firing of the heads of Radio Free Europe/Radio Liberty, Radio Free Asia, and the Open Technology Fund. The purge was carried out by Michael Pack, a conservative film-maker who is under investigation for allegedly misusing funds from his nonprofit Public Media Fund for his for-profit film agency.
- June 19 – United States Senate Committee on the Judiciary chairperson Lindsey Graham (R-SC) says he will not hold hearings on Bill Barr's appointment of Donald Trump flunkie Jay Clayton to be the next Senate-confirmed U.S. attorney for the United States District Court for the Southern District of New York unless he gets "blue slips" from both New York senators, Chuck Schumer (D-NY) and Kirsten Gillibrand (D-NY). The U.S. Attorney's office is involved in several investigations of Trump and Trump-henchmen.
- June 20
  - President Trump reschedules a campaign rally originally planned for Juneteenth in Tulsa, Oklahoma, sight of the Tulsa race massacre in 1921. Reportedly 100,000 tickets were sold for the 19,000-person venue, which was filled well below capacity. Trump spoke for about 90 minutes, used a racial slur, and repeated his support for Confederate statues, but did not reference Juneteenth or George Floyd.
  - Attorney General Barr says Trump fired Geoffrey Berman, U.S. Attorney for the Southern District of New York.
- June 23 – Elections
  - Kentucky Democratic primary rescheduled from May 19 After the entire city of Louisville (population 700,000) was reduced to one voting location, thousands are locked out and denied the vote due to a traffic jam.
  - New York Democratic primary rescheduled from April 28 African-American schoolteacher Jamaal Bowman defeats Eliot Engel for the nomination in New York's 16th congressional district. Progressive Mondaire Jones wins the nomination in New York's 17th congressional district.
  - Runoff election for Republican nominee in North Carolina's 11th congressional district. Twenty-four-year-old investor Madison Cawthorn defeats the candidate endorsed by Donald Trump. If elected, Cawthorn will be the youngest person elected to Congress.
- June 24 – The U.S. Senate confirms President Trump's 200th judicial nominee, Cory T. Wilson to the United States Court of Appeals for the Fifth Circuit by a vote of 52–48 with only Senator Susan Collins (R-ME) dissenting from the Republican majority.
- June 26 – The White House denies that President Trump was briefed about Russian bounties to the Taliban for killing American soldiers in Afghanistan, but does not deny the intelligence itself.
- June 27 – COVID-19 pandemic: A Los Angeles sweatshop owned by Dov Charney is forced to close after 300 infections and four deaths are reported there.

=== July ===
- July 3 – Donald Trump holds a campaign rally at taxpayer expense at Mount Rushmore, South Dakota, as social distancing is ignored and few mask are worn by the 7,500 participants. A group on Native American protesters blocked the access road briefly before the event, and 15 were arrested.
- July 4 – President Trump makes a politically divisive speech from the South Lawn of the White House to commemorate Independence Day.
- July 5
  - A group of mostly Black, heavily armed protesters march through Stone Mountain Park in Georgia, demanding removal of the Confederate sculpture the park is best known for.
  - Singer Kanye West declares his independent candidacy for the presidency although he has already missed several state deadlines and does nothing else to promote such a campaign.
- July 6 – Supreme Court of the United States: In a unanimous decision, SCOTUS rules that individuals elected to the United States Electoral College are not free agents and must vote according to the laws of their state, eliminating "rogue" electors. In a 6–3 decision, the Court upholds the ban on most robocalls, including those with political messages, to cell phones.
- July 7 – One million foreign students risk losing their visas under new immigration rules that forbid them from remaining in the country if their universities offer only on-line classes.
- July 8
  - SCOTUS: The Supreme Court rules 7–2 to let more employers opt-out of the Affordable Care Act mandate guaranteeing no-cost contraceptive services for women.
  - Democratic primary in New Jersey: Amy Kennedy will face incumbent Jeff Van Drew (R-NJ) in New Jersey's 2nd congressional district. Incumbent Cory Booker (D-NJ) survives against progressive challenger Lawrence Hamm in the Democratic Senate primary.
  - Houston officials cancel the in-person Texas Republican Convention, scheduled for July 13–18.
- July 9
  - SCOTUS
    - The Court rules 7-2 that Trump must turn over his tax records to the Manhattan prosecutor, but they will not be made available to House investigators or the general public.
    - In a 5–4 decision, the Court rules that a large part of Oklahoma belongs to the Muscogee (Creek) Nation and upholds treaty obligations.
- July 10 – Trump commutes the sentence of dirty-trickster Roger Stone.
- July 11 – Rescheduled Louisiana primaries. Originally planned for April 4 and then changed to June 20; early voting expanded and mail-in votes are encouraged.
- July 14
  - The Asheville, North Carolina city council approves 7-0 a plan to provide reparations to the community's black residents.
  - Congressman Steve Watkins (R-KS) is charged with three felonies and a misdemeanor in relation to voter fraud in the 2019 Topeka municipal elections.
  - Elections
    - Runoff primaries in Alabama: Trump-supported football coach Tommy Tuberville defeats former senator and attorney general Jeff Sessions for the Republican Senate nomination.
    - Runoff primaries in Texas
    - Maine primaries
- July 15 – COVID-19 pandemic: The Trump administration politicizes health information by ordering hospitals to send all coronavirus patient information to a central database in Washington rather than to the CDC.
- July 20 – Georgia State Senator Nikema Williams (D), is chosen to replace Representative John Lewis (D-GA) on the ballot in November.
- July 21
  - Twitter bans 7,000 QAnon accounts and limits 150,000 others.
  - Ohio Democrats call for the repeal of a nuclear bailout bill after Ohio Speaker Larry Householder (R) is arrested on bribery charges related to the bill.
- July 23 – The Senate approves the $740.5 billion National Defense Authorization Act for Fiscal Year 2021 (NDAA) 86–14, including a provision to rename military bases, over President Trump's veto threat.
- July 24 – Officials in New York State, the District of Columbia, and 19 other states, as well as a dozen cities and counties, sue Donald Trump for his memo excluding undocumented immigrants from the 2020 census.
- July 27 – The Richmond, Virginia, Police Department determines that weekend riots were instigated by white supremacists under the guise of the Black Lives Matter movement.
- July 28
  - AG William Barr appears before the United States House Committee on the Judiciary.
  - Joe Biden reveals economic plan to address racial inequality.
- July 29
  - CEO tech "emperors" from Amazon, Facebook, Google, and Apple testify before the United States House Judiciary Subcommittee on Antitrust, Commercial and Administrative Law.
  - Oregon Governor Kate Brown (D) announces a phased withdrawal of federal forces from Portland after two months of protests.
  - The New York election commission announces it has finished counting the votes from the June 23 primaries.
- July 30 – Donald Trump threatens to postpone the election if it appears mail-in-votes might go against him. Leaders of both parties reject the suggestion.
- July 31 – Congressman David Schweikert (R-AZ) is sanctioned by the House of Representatives for violating campaign finance rules and improperly using official resources for his reelection efforts.

=== August ===
- August 2 – After failing to get Senate approval for retired Army Brigadier General Anthony Tata as Under Secretary of Defense for Policy, Donald Trump appoints him as "the official Performing the Duties of the Deputy Undersecretary of Defense for Policy;" doing "an end run around Congress" according to Congressman Adam Smith (D-WA).
- August 3
  - Nevada Governor Steve Sisolak (D) signs legislation authorizing mail-in-voting for every registered voter in the state.
  - Donald Trump fires the Tennessee Valley Authority (TVA) chairman and another board member, saying they were overpaid and because they outsourced 200 high-tech jobs.
- August 4 – Primary elections
  - Arizona: Anti-immigrant former sheriff Joe Arpaio loses his second comeback attempt.
  - Kansas: Conservative Kris Kobach and indicted Steve Watkins lose the Republican nominations for U.S. Senate and Kansas's 2nd congressional district respectively.
  - Michigan: Nurse and lawyer Eric Esshaki wins the Republican primary to face Haley Stevens (D) in Michigan's 11th District.
  - Missouri: Progressive Cori Bush wins the Democratic nomination in an upset for Missouri's 1st congressional district.
  - Washington: Former Tacoma mayor Marilyn Strickland (D) wins the state's jungle primary in Washington's 10th congressional district.
- August 6
  - Letitia James, the Attorney General of New York, sues to dissolve the National Rifle Association of America (NRA) on grounds of financial misconduct.
  - Trump-backed Bill Hagerty defeats far-right Manny Sethi for the Tennessee Republican Senate nomination. A record 116,000 mail-in votes were cast, although the Tennessee Supreme Court has ruled that fear of COVID-19 will not be an acceptable reason to vote by mail in the general election.
  - Donald Trump signs an executive order banning social media platforms TikTok and WeChat in 45 days, citing national security concerns.
  - Congressman Mark Walker (R-NC) calls for the resignation of Liberty University president Jerry Falwell Jr. after Falwell is involved in a sex scandal.
  - George Floyd protests
    - Milwaukee Police Chief Alfonso Morales is demoted to captain over the department's use of tear gas during protests against police brutality.
    - Four protesters arrested for breaking windows and throwing red paint at a building face life imprisonment in Salt Lake City.
- August 7
  - Canadian Deputy Prime Minister Chrystia Freeland said that the government "intends to swiftly impose dollar-for-dollar countermeasures" in response to Donald Trump's August 6 announcement that he is re-imposing tariffs on aluminum.
  - The United States Court of Appeals for the District of Columbia Circuit rules 7-2 that the House can sue former White House counsel Don McGahn to comply with a congressional subpoena.
- August 8
  - After Congress fails to produce funding to address the health and economic crises, Donald Trump signs executive orders to provide a temporary payroll tax suspension and other issues.
  - One hundred people are arrested and 13 police officers are injured after police shoot an armed man in the Chicago Loop.
- August 9 – Rescheduled Puerto Rico primary elections
- August 11
  - Joe Biden chooses Senator Kamala Harris (D-CA) as his running mate.
  - Georgia primary runoffs
    - Fani Willis defeats incumbent Fulton County District Attorney Paul J. Howard.
    - Marjorie Taylor Greene defeats John Cowan for the Republican Party nomination in Georgia's 14th congressional district.
  - Primaries in Connecticut, Minnesota, Vermont, and Wisconsin; runoff primaries in Georgia
- August 17 to 20 – 2020 Democratic National Convention
- August 16 – Puerto Rico holds a second-round of primary elections after a ballot shortage during the first round on August 9.
- August 18
  - Primaries in Alaska, Florida, and Wyoming
    - Alaska: Independent Al Gross (politician), 58, wins the Democratic nomination for U.S. Senate.
    - Florida: Far-right conspiracy theorist Laura Loomer, 27, wins the Republican nomination for Florida's 21st congressional district. Democratic incumbent Lois Frankel is favored to win.
  - Trump pardons Susan B. Anthony.
  - A Senate Select Committee on Intelligence report determines that there were significant ties between Russia and the 2016 Trump campaign. "[Paul] Manafort hired and worked increasingly closely with a Russian national, Konstantin Kilimnik. Kilimnik is a Russian intelligence officer," the report says.
  - Goodyear Tire and Rubber Company stock drops 3.5% after Donald Trump called for a boycott of the company which had banned "MAGA" and "Blue Lives Matter" clothing. Akron, Ohio Mayor Dan Horrigan (D) tweeted that Trump was trying to destroy jobs.
- August 19
  - Facebook bans thousands of ads, groups, and pages linked to QAnon.
  - Steve Bannon is arrested for fraud in soliciting private donations to build a border wall.
- August 21
  - COVID-19 pandemic: At least eight cases are linked to the Sturgis Motorcycle Rally.
  - 2020 United States Postal Service crisis: Postmaster General Louis DeJoy defends slowdowns at the USPS in testimony before the Senate Homeland Security Committee.
- August 23
  - White House advisor Kellyanne Conway, 53, announces her resignation to concentrate on her family.
  - Aaron Coleman, 19, who won the Democratic primary for the 37th district of the Kansas House of Representatives on August 4, drops out. Coleman engaged in revenge porn when he was 14 years old. The incumbent Stan Frownfelter plans to enter the race as a write-in candidate; As of August 24, no Republican had yet declared.
  - Protests break out in Kenosha, Wisconsin after the shooting of Jacob Blake, an unarmed black man and father of three. Black was shot in the back at point-blank range as his children watched.
- August 24 – 2020 Republican National Convention
- August 25
  - Republican National Convention: Nine Progressive groups demand that broadcasters delay coverage until they can fact-check statements by participants. Congressman Joaquin Castro (D-TX) plans to investigate the Secretary of State for apparent Hatch Act violations for speaking at a partisan political event while on a diplomatic mission in Jerusalem.
  - Trump pardons former bank robber Jon Ponder.
- August 26
  - Shooting of Jacob Blake: Two people are killed and one injured by a shooter during the protests. An Illinois teenager is arrested.
- August 28
  - Postal workers say first-class and priority mail is still running behind schedule. “Some stations have so much mail backed up, it's three times more than the volume you would see at Christmas,” Keith Richardson, president of the American Postal Workers Union, Chicago, Local 1 said.
  - The director of national intelligence, John Ratcliffe informs Congress that he will no longer provide in-person briefings about election security and foreign election interference.
- August 28 – March on Washington organized by Rev. Al Sharpton and the family of George Floyd.

=== September ===
- September 1 – Massachusetts primaries Incumbent Senator Ed Markey (D-MA) defeats Congressman Joe Kennedy III (D-MA) in the Senate primary. Former Republican moderate Jake Auchincloss wins the Democratic nomination for Kennedy's House seat with only 23% of the vote.
- September 3 – The North Carolina elections commission explains to Donald Trump and Attorney General Bill Barr that voting twice is illegal.
- September 8
  - Post office crisis: Trump throws Postmaster General DeJoy under the bus; supports campaign financing investigation.
  - New Hampshire and Rhode Island primaries
- September 9
  - COVID-19 pandemic: The White House ends screening for international travelers.
  - Presidential campaigns: Biden visits suburban Warren, Michigan. Christian Tybring-Gjedde, a member of the Norwegian right-wing Progress Party, nominates Trump for the Nobel Peace Prize for the Abraham Accords. Trump admits in Rage by Bob Woodward that he deliberately downplayed the COVID-19 pandemic.
  - Iraq War: The United States Army announces a reduction of 5,200 troops in Iraq.
  - Tesla CEO Elon Musk calls former Labor Secretary (1993–1997) Robert Reich a "moron" after the latter calls Musk a "modern-day robber baron" in a dispute about Tesla employee compensation.
- September 11
  - The DoD cancels a Navy low-level flyover of New York City deemed "inappropriate."
  - Microsoft warns of Russian, Chinese, and Iranian interference in the 2020 elections.
  - The National debt of the United States increases to $3 trillion.
  - DOJ lawyer Nora Dannehy resigns from the U.S. Attorney's team that is investigating the origins of the Trump-Russia investigation.
- September 13 – Sunday morning cable newscasters Chris Wallace (Fox News Sunday) and Jake Trapper (State of the Union) humiliate Trump campaign surrogate Steve Cortes and White House advisor Peter Navarro when they try to whitewash revelations that Trump deliberately misled the American public about the COVID-19 pandemic.
- September 14 – HHS Assistant Secretary for Public Affairs Michael Caputo claims that top scientists at the CDC are plotting against Trump by telling the truth about the coronavirus pandemic and that Trump supporters should buy ammunition for their guns if Biden wins the election.
- September 15 – Presidential campaign: Scientific American endorses Joe Biden, the first time in its 175-year history it endorses a presidential candidate.
- September 18
  - Associate Justice Ruth Bader Ginsburg dies at age 87, leaving a vacancy on the United States Supreme Court. The dispute over her seat promises to become a major issue in the elections.
  - The DoD announces that it is sending a small contingent of troops and tanks to Syria after a run-in with Russia.
- September 22 – The Maine Supreme Judicial Court approves first-in-the-nation ranked-choice voting in the November 3 presidential election.
- September 29 – The first presidential debate is held at the Case Western Reserve University Health Education Campus in Cleveland.

=== October ===
- October 7 – The vice presidential debate is held at the University of Utah in Salt Lake City.
- October 15 – After the second presidential debate is cancelled by Donald Trump, he and Joe Biden hold competing Town hall meetings.
- October 22 – Final presidential debate at Belmont University in Nashville.
- October 26 – Election officials in Pennsylvania report that one-fifth of the state's nine million voters have already cast their votes. 2.9 million mail-in requests were received by October 23.
- October 30
  - Early votes in Texas surpass the total turnout from 2016.
  - 3.8 million people cast votes in Georgia by the end of the three-week early-voting period, which is nearly half the total registered voters in the state and nearly equaling the total vote in the 2016 United States presidential election in Georgia.
- October 31 – Former President Barack Obama and musician Stevie Wonder join Democratic presidential candidate Joe Biden at a drive-in campaign event in Belle Isle Park in Detroit.

=== November ===
- November 3 – 2020 United States elections:
  - 2020 United States presidential election: Joe Biden (D) is declared the winner.
  - 2020 United States Senate elections: Republicans retain 50 seats while two Senate seats in Georgia go to a January 5, 2021 runoff.
  - 2020 United States House of Representatives elections: Republicans make gains although Democrats retain control.
  - 2020 United States gubernatorial elections: Republicans flip Montana, increasing their control to 27 gubernatorial mansions.
  - Post-election lawsuits related to the 2020 United States presidential election
- November 8 – Thousands dance in the streets across the country when Joe Biden and Kamala Harris are declared victors in the presidential election.
- November 9 – President-elect Joe Biden reveals his COVID-19 task force.
- November 14
  - Thousands, including members of Proud Boys, Oath Keepers, and QAnon march in the Million MAGA March in support of Donald Trump in Washington DC.
  - Secretary of State Mike Pompeo begins a seven-country tour of France, Turkey, Georgia, Israel, the United Arab Emirates, Qatar, and Saudi Arabia.
- November 16
  - Georgia Secretary of State Brad Raffensperger says Republicans are pressuring him to exclude legal ballots during the recount to ensure victory for Trump.
  - 88,500 sexual abuse allegations have been filed against the Boy Scouts of America.
- November 17 – Acting Secretary of Defense Christopher C. Miller announces that the U.S. will withdraw 2,500 troops from Afghanistan and Iraq by January 15, 2021.
- November 18 – U.S. District Judge Emmet G. Sullivan issues an injunction in Washington ordering the Department of Homeland Security to stop expelling unaccompanied migrant children who arrived to the U.S.-Mexico border by themselves.
- November 20 – Pfizer applies to the Food and Drug Administration (FDA) for emergency authorization to distribute its COVID-19 vaccine.
- November 21 – Donald Trump stays for opening remarks of the virtual 2020 G20 Riyadh summit (G20) before leaving to play golf and does not participate in the discussion about the COVID-19 pandemic.
- November 22 – The United States pulls out of the Treaty on Open Skies that allow nations to conduct flyovers of other allies in an attempt to collect military data and other intelligence on neighboring foreign enemies.
- November 23
  - After General Services Administration (GSA) Administrator Emily Murphy ignored a request to testify before the House Appropriations and Oversight and Reform committees, President Trump ordered the agency to begin the transition process.
  - President-elect Biden names his national security team: Antony Blinken (Secretary of State), Alejandro Mayorkas (Secretary of Homeland Security), Avril Haines (Director of National Intelligence), and Linda Thomas-Greenfield (U.S. Ambassador to the United Nations). Biden also names John Kerry as the Presidential Envoy on Climate Change or "Climate Czar." Other nominees are Jake Sullivan (National Security Advisor), and Janet Yellen (Secretary of the Treasury).
- November 26 – While still complaining about election fraud, Trump agrees to leave the White House if the Electoral College votes to give the election to Biden.

=== December ===
- December 1 – A group of historians sue the Trump administration over its failure to preserve historical records in violation of the Presidential Records Act (National Security Archive v. Trump, 20-cv-03500, U.S. District Court, District of Columbia).
- December 4
  - U.S. district judge Nicholas Garaufis orders the reinstatement of Deferred Action for Childhood Arrivals (DACA).
  - Barack Obama holds a virtual rally for Democratic U.S. Senate candidates in Georgia.
  - Vice President Mike Pence holds two rallies for Republican Senate candidates in Georgia.
- December 5
  - The U.S. suspends five cultural programs with China.
  - Donald Trump orders the almost complete withdrawal of U.S. troops from Somalia by January 15.
  - Concerns about post-election violence grow as Donald Trump continues to push charges of election fraud.
  - A small crowd of heavily armed protesters gather outside the home of an Akron, Ohio to protest COVID-19 health restrictions.
  - Most of California is ordered under lockdown due to surges in the COVID-19 infections.
  - Joe Biden secures more than 270 Electoral College votes as California certifies its election results.
  - In his first post-electoral trip, Donald Trump campaigns for Republican Senate candidates Kelly Loeffler and David Perdue in Georgia.
- December 6
  - Republican Kelly Loeffler and Democrat Raphael Warnock face off on a nationally televised debate in the 2020–21 United States Senate special election in Georgia. Democrat Jon Ossoff debated an empty podium in the 2020–21 United States Senate election in Georgia.
  - Staten Island bar-owner Danny Presti is arrested after hitting a sheriff's deputy with his car following his open defiance of health restrictions related to the COVID-19 pandemic in New York (state).
  - Michigan Secretary of State Jocelyn Benson reports that dozens of armed protesters gathered outside her house, threatening her and her four-year-old son with violence if she does not accede to their demands. Democratic lawmaker Cynthia Johnson revealed recordings of several death threats she received on her personal phone.
  - Virginia Military Institute (VMI) announces it is removing a statue of Confederate General Stonewall Jackson, a former VMI professor. The statue will be relocated to a Civil War museum located on a battlefield where a number of VMI cadets and alumni were killed or wounded.
  - The Arizona State Legislature is forced to close for at least a week after lawyer Rudy Giuliani, who has tested positive for COVID-19, testifies without a facemask for eleven hours about unproven charges of voter fraud.
  - Florida Department of Law Enforcement (FDLE) agents raided the home and pointed guns at the children of a scientist who was fired for not manipulating COVID-19 data.
- December 8
  - Biden reveals his health team: Xavier Becerra (Secretary of Health and Human Services—HHS), Jeff Zients (White House coronavirus coordinator), Dr. Rochelle Walensky (Centers of Disease Control and Prevention—CDC), Dr. Anthony Fauci (medical adviser), Dr. Vivek Murthy (Surgeon General), and Dr. Marcella Nunez-Smith (equitability).
  - Killing of Vanessa Guillén: Fourteen senior Army officers and enlisted personnel at Fort Hood are fired or suspended following an independent panel's review of the command climate and culture at the base.
  - The Senate votes 49–46 to approve a partisan FCC commissioner, Nathan Simington.
- December 9
  - Biden nominates General Lloyd Austin, 67, as Secretary of Defense and asks Congress to approve a waiver allowing Austin to serve despite having retired only four years ago.
- December 9 – Biden nominates Katherine Tai as head of trade.
  - The Senate joins the House in approving the $740 billion National Defense Authorization Act for Fiscal Year 2021 over Trump's veto threat.
  - Joe Biden and Kamala Harris are chosen as Time Person of the Year. Der Spiegel names Donald Trump Der Verlierer des Jahres (English: "Loser of the Year").
- December 11 – Biden nominates Tom Vilsack (Secretary of Agriculture), Congresswoman Marcia Fudge (HUD secretary) and Susan Rice (director of the United States Domestic Policy Council).
- December 12 – Between 12,000 and 15,000 mostly unmasked pro-Trump supporters rally in Washington, DC in protest against the president's election defeat. Four people are stabbed and 23 are arrested.
- December 14
  - Joe Biden wins the Electoral College vote 306–232. The presidents of Brazil, Mexico, and Russia congratulate Biden and Harris.
  - Bill Barr resigns as Attorney General.
  - A multi-agency cyber breach, possibly related to Russian intelligence, is discovered.
- December 15
  - Senate Majority Leader Mitch McConnell (R-KY) congratulates Biden and Harris on their win.
  - Former South Bend mayor Pete Buttigieg is nominated as United States Secretary of Transportation. Former EPA head Gina McCarthy is nominated as Biden's domestic climate change czar.
- December 16 – COVID-19 pandemic: Dr. Joseph Varon, chief of the United Memorial Medical Center (Houston, TX) critical care unit says half his staff will not get the COVID-19 vaccine for political reasons.
- December 18
  - COVID-19 pandemic: Vice President Mike Pence, Surgeon General Jerome Adams, and several Congressional leaders receive the first dosis of the vaccine.
  - Congresswoman Deb Haaland (D-NM) is nominated for Secretary of the Interior. Former Michigan governor Jennifer Granholm is nominated for Energy Secretary.
- December 19
  - U.S. Presidential election: President Trump and his advisors discuss implementing martial law to overthrow the election. A day earlier they had discussed seizing voting machines manufactured by Dominion Voting Systems. They also discussed hiring Sidney Powell, who was fired from the campaign for pushing conspiracy theories, as a special prosecutor special counsel to investigate election fraud.
- December 21
  - Congress approves $900 billion in funding to fight the COVID-19 pandemic and its economic effects. It also supports the National Museum of the American Latino, and Smithsonian American Women's History Museum.
  - Conservative television networks Fox News and Newsmax TV admit they lied about voter fraud.
- December 22
  - Senate Majority Leader Mitch McConnell promises to allow floor votes on all of Biden's Cabinet nominees.
  - Trump pardons Republican cronies who pleaded guilty during the Mueller investigation plus four Blackwater guards convicted of killing Iraqi civilians.
  - California Governor Gavin Newsom names Secretary of State Alex Padilla to fill the Senate seat to be vacated by Vice-President elect Kamala Harris.
- December 23
  - Biden names Connecticut education commissioner Miguel Cardona Secretary of Education.
  - Trump vetoes the National Defense Authorization Act for Fiscal Year 2021.
  - The State Department rules that products originating in occupied areas of Palestine shall be labeled "Made in Israel" rather than "Made in Palestine" or "Made in Gaza".
- December 27 – After threats to veto it, Trump signs the Consolidated Appropriations Act, 2021.
- December 28
  - Presidential transition of Joe Biden: Biden denounces political appointees at the Defense Department for putting up “roadblocks” and keeping his transition team at bay.
- December 29 – Senator McConnell (R-KY) single-handedly blocks a vote to join the House in approving an approval supported by President Trump and Democrats to increase the COVID-19 stimulus from $600 to $2,000 per person.
- December 30 – Senate Democrats and independents delay McConnell's attempt to override President Trump's veto of the National Defense Authorization Act for Fiscal Year 2021. The House voted 322–87 to override on December 28.

== History by government agency ==
Note: This section is provided for updates by government body or agency in a narrative format if desired.

=== Census Bureau ===
The 2020 United States census was plagued with problems. The COVID-19 pandemic caused delays and made data collection difficult. President Trump's attempts to politicize the census and not count immigrants resulted in further confusion, undercounts, and delays, so that the Census Bureau was forced to miss its December 31 deadline for determining Congressional redistricting. It is generally assumed that undercounting immigrants could swing the apportionment of at least three Congressional seats from blue to red states.

=== Congressional Budget Office ===
The Congressional Budget Office (CBO) predicts the federal budget deficit will reach $1 billion for the first time since 2012. Deficits will rise from 4.6% to 5.4% of GDP by 2030, the highest since World War II.

=== Defense Department ===
Secretary of Defense Mark Esper warns in early January that Kata'ib Hezbollah, the group responsible for the attack on the embassy in Baghdad, may be planning new attacks in Iraq, and that the U.S. is prepared to preemptive attacks. A short while later, a U.S. airstrike at the Baghdad International Airport killed top Iranian general Qasem Soleimani, escalating tensions between the United States and Iran.

In January, the Army prohibited its members from using TikTok, saying the Chinese-owned social media poses a security risk.

Heavy traffic apparently fueled by fears of a return of the draft for the first time since 1973 caused the Selective Service System website to crash on January 3.

The U.S. military deployed a new submarine-launched low-yield nuclear weapon, seen as critical to countering the threat posed by Russia's arsenal of smaller tactical nukes. The new warheads, the first new U.S. nuclear weapon in decades, were first produced in February 2019.

On March 2, President Trump sent the nomination of Kenneth Braithwaite for United States Secretary of the Navy to the Senate. Braithwaite's predecessor, Richard Spencer, resigned in November 2019 after criticizing the pardoning of Navy SEAL Eddie Gallagher, who had been accused of war crimes.

In mid-March, Secretary Esper announced thirteen cases of COVID-19 among the military and their dependents, suspended tours of The Pentagon, and imposed a 60-day travel ban on service members, DOD employees, and their dependents. Participation of U.S. forces in military exercises in Europe, South Korea, Africa, and Antarctica have also been restricted or reduced.

The DoD plans to suspend publication of Stars and Stripes on September 30 and dissolve the organization by January 31, 2021.

Secretary Esper was fired on November 9, after former VP Joe Biden was declared the winner of the presidential election. Christopher C. Miller is named Acting Secretary. Esper had supported renaming military bases that honor Confederate soldiers and had disagreed with the President on deploying troops to suppress demonstrations.

=== EPA ===
In December 2019, the EPA announced that it will seek to address concerns emphasized by American farmers over new rules for blending biofuels.

New rules proposed on January 3 would exempt long-term accumulative effects such as climate change from being considered in the implementation of the National Environmental Policy Act. Court cases extending back to the Obama administration have ruled that such effects must be taken into consideration.

The EPA announced on December 7 that it would not strengthen standards for particulate-matter air pollution, despite evidence that such a change would save thousands of lives.

=== Education Department ===
In December 2019, consumer advocates sued the U.S. Department of Education and the Consumer Financial Protection Bureau, alleging that these government agencies had failed to protect student loan borrowers. The lawsuit provides an overview of the alleged problems. The U.S. Department of Education is the biggest player in the student loan world, handling hundreds of billions of dollars in federal student loan debt. Rather than managing this sprawling portfolio itself, however, the Department outsources operations to several large servicing companies.

Large student loan servicing firms such as Navient, FedLoan Servicing have been faced with allegations of violations of consumer protection statutes. But the Department of Education has largely not addressed these issues, and has omitted to oversee its servicers (who receive billions from taxpayers).

The Education Department announced in February that it was changing the rules for more than 800 rural schools, cutting off federal funds designed to help poor, rural schools.

=== FEMA ===
President Trump has made Federal Emergency Management Agency (FEMA) aid available for Puerto Rico since the December 29, 2019, earthquake. However, as of January 9, only $1.5 billion of the $9.7 billion approved by Congress has been released.

FEMA says it may bill 2015–2018 California fire victims if Pacific Gas and Electric Company (PG&E) goes bankrupt.

=== Intelligence community ===
President Trump nominates former Congressman John Ratcliffe (R-TX) as Director of National Intelligence for the second time. Senate Majority Leader Mitch McConnell refuses to support Ratcliffe. Since Dan Coats resigned in August 2019 because of differences with the president, Trump appointed two acting directors, emphasizing loyalty over competence or experience.

=== NASA ===
NASA may return to crewed flights in 2020, in cooperation with private companies such as Boeing.

Two veteran NASA astronauts, Doug Hurley and Bob Behnken, were launched in NASA's first crewed flight on May 30, 2020, in a spaceship (SpaceX Dragon 2) built by Space Exploration Technologies Corp. A four-person crew flew a second flight on November 16.

=== Post Office ===
Following 13 consecutive fiscal years of financial losses (mostly due to a requirement that it fund health care for the next 80 years), the United States Postal Service may be privatized in 2020.

Postmaster General Louis DeJoy introduced cost-cutting measures in August that were widely seen as designed to lower voter turnout, including the removal of mail-sorting machines and the removal of public, blue mailboxes. DeJoy walked back some of his reforms after sharp criticism, but the effect of his actions is likely to persist until after the November 3 election. DeJoy is a major contributor to President Trump, and he is being investigated for conflicts of interest. He and the USPS are being sued by 20 states.

=== Social Security Administration ===
The Social Security Administration (SSA) plans to make it harder for 500,000 older Americans to receive Social Security Disability Insurance (SSDI) benefits, it was revealed in March.

=== State Department ===
The situation in Iraq causes Secretary of State Mike Pompeo to postpone a planned visit to Ukraine and other eastern European countries in early January.

=== Treasury Department ===
A bipartisan bill proposes transferring control of the Secret Service back to the Treasury Department, but it is hung up on a dispute over whether to disclose the costs of protection for President Trump's travel.

== History by issue ==
Note: This section is provided for issue-based overviews in narrative format, if desired.

=== Banking and finance ===
In the first half of 2019, global debt levels reached a record high of $250 trillion, led by the US and China. The IMF warned about corporate debt. The European Central Bank raised concerns as well. The EU was concerned about high rates of debt in France, Italy and Spain.

=== Education ===
Educational issues ranged from funding for preschool to online vs. in-person education during the pandemic to college debt relief. Education Secretary Betsy DeVos's penchant for charter and private schools over public schools was another concern.

=== Environment ===
In 2020, expect major fights over EPA regulatory rollbacks, as well as conflicts over the environmental impact of the Mexico–United States border wall, the Atlantic Coast Pipeline, PFAS (a cancer-linked chemical leaching into drinking water), the Waters of the U.S. Rule, and the Arctic Refuge drilling controversy. Underfunding of the EPA has led to an increased backlog at major hazardous waste sites.

The Trump Administration plans to rewrite EPA regulations to make it easier to build major infrastructure projects such as pipelines. The Washington Post reported on October 30 that Trump had rolled back 125 environmental policies and rules with another 40 on the way, including the relaxation of Obama-era power plant pollution standards, efficiency standards for washing machines, and the opening of the Tongass National Forest to logging.

==== Climate change ====
In December 2019, the World Meteorological Organization released its annual climate report revealing that climate impacts are worsening. They found the global sea temperatures are rising as well as land temperatures worldwide. 2019 is the last year in a decade that is the warmest on record.

Global carbon emissions hit a record high in 2019, even though the rate of increase slowed somewhat, according to a report from Global Carbon Project.

Progressives such as Senator Bernie Sanders (I-VT), Congresswoman Alexandria Ocasio-Cortez (D-NY), and the Green Party of the United States have advocated for a Green New Deal involving the elimination of carbon emissions by 2035, strict environmental laws, and economic reforms. President-elect Joe Biden has endorsed some of those ideas (such as a return to the 2016 Paris Agreement) although his ideas commitments are more moderate (such as an end to carbon emissions from electrical production by 2050 and a ban on hydraulic fracking on federal land but not a general ban).

=== Foreign policy ===
President Donald Trump faced his first foreign policy crisis of 2020 with the attack on the U.S. Embassy in Baghdad, Iraq on December 31, 2019, and January 1, 2020. A January 2 U.S.-ordered strike that killed Abu Mahdi al-Muhandis, a terrorist with close ties to Iran, threatened to escalate the conflict.

President Trump may find his greatest challenges in Europe, where his popularity is very low. Tariffs, trade, and China's growing military power are concerns, as is unrest in Hong Kong. There is concern about Russian involvement in Syria as well as its increasingly aggressive foreign policy.

There is increased pressure to reduce troop levels in Afghanistan to 8,600 and reach a peace agreement with the Taliban. On November 18, Trump ordered U.S. troops in Afghanistand and Iraq to be reduced to 2,500 in each country by January 15. He then ordered a withdrawal of the 800 U.S. troops in Somalia.

==== Conflict with Iran ====
Tensions with Iran rise as 2020 begins. Sticky points are not only the attack on the U.S. Embassy in Bagdhad, but also a nuclear agreement, shipping in the Strait of Hormuz, economic sanctions, and the war in Yemen. Tension increased after the United States killed Iranian General Qasem Soleimani in a drone strike in Bagdhad on January 3. President Trump claimed the targeted killing prevented an attack on American interests and saved many lives, insisting he does not want a war while warning Iran against retaliation. Many are concerned that Iranian retaliation could lead to a wider conflict.

Domestic political reaction was mostly along party lines, with Republicans, particularly Senator Lindsey Graham (R-SC), supporting the move and Democrats opposing it. Senator Rand Paul (R-KY) and Fox News commentator Tucker Carlson were exceptions. On the Democratic side, Senator Bernie Sanders (I-VT) had the strongest reaction, calling the killing an "assassination;" he was echoed by Andrew Yang and Congresswoman Tulsi Gabbard. Other Democratic presidential candidates were more muted, calling Soleimani a bad man but questioning Trump's lack of strategic planning. House Speaker Nancy Pelosi complained that the Congressional Gang of Eight was not notified before the attack, which was therefore unauthorized.

Thousands marched in anti-war protests in seventy cities across the nation and around the world on January 4.

US House Speaker Nancy Pelosi announced she would introduce a resolution to limit Trump's ability to take actions against Iran. Former Vice President Joe Biden called for sanctions relief in April in light of the COVID-19 pandemic in Iran. As six U.S. Navy ships conducted drills in the Persian Gulf on April 17, 2020, eleven Iranian Navy of the Islamic Revolutionary Guard Corps ships harassed them, some coming within ten yards (9 meters) of the American ships. On April 21, President Trump ordered the Americans to "shoot down and destroy any and all Iranian gunboats" that harass American warships in international waters.

An August CNN report alleges that the Iranian government paid bounties to Taliban fighters that led to the December 2019 attack on a U.S. airbase that resulted in two dead and 70 people injured, including four American soldiers.

The November 27 assassination of nuclear scientist Mohsen Fakhrizadeh, presumably by Israel, is expected to make normalization of United States-Iranian relations under a Biden administration difficult.

==== Venezuela ====
On March 26, 2020, the United States accused Venezuelan President Nicolás Maduro of narcoterrorism and offered a $15 million reward for information leading to his arrest. On March 31, Secretary of State Mike Pompeo said that sanctions did not apply to humanitarian aid during the health emergency and that the United States would lift all sanctions if Maduro agreed to organize elections that did not include him in a period of six to twelve months. Pompeo reiterated U.S. support for Juan Guaidó. On April 1, Trump announced that he was sendin anti-drug Navy ships and AWACS planes to the Caribbean near Venezuela in the largest military build-up in the region since the 1989 invasion of Panama. Elliott Abrams, the United States special representative for Venezuela, claimed on April 23 that "many people" both inside and outside the Maduro government support the proposed U.S. transition to a government that would involve neither Maduro nor Guaidó.

==== Disarmament ====
North Korea threatens to resume nuclear testing as the year begins. Disarmament is also a concern in relations with Russia and Iran. Iran's January 5 pullout from its nuclear agreement following the killing of Qasem Soleimani was no surprise but it makes it more difficult to reach another agreement at a later date.

Incidents of saber rattling by American rivals increase as the coronavirus pandemic winds down in April 2020. Iranian patrol boats harass U.S. naval ships in the Persian Gulf, Russian planes fly dangerously close to American fighters in the eastern Mediterranean, and North Korea fires missile tests into the Sea of Japan. Intelligence sources suspect China is preparing for low-intensity nuclear tests. The Islamic Revolutionary Guard Corps launched its first satellite on April 22.

The United States withdrew from the 1987 Intermediate-Range Nuclear Forces Treaty (INF) on August 2, effective February 2021. The U.S. formally withdrew from the 1992 Treaty on Open Skies in November 2020. Dismantlement of the two Boeing OC-135B Open Skies planes was begun right away, making it almost impossible for President-elect to reverse the decision after he takes office in January.

=== Guns ===
Gun laws and 2nd Amendment rights promise to be major issues in 2020, in Congress, on the campaign trail, and at the state level, particularly in Virginia. 177 gun deaths (murders, accidents, and 132 suicides; three mass shootings) were recorded across the country on January 1. New Mexico joins New York, California, Florida, and other states in passing a red flag law on February 25.

=== Health issues ===
==== Coronavirus outbreak ====
Dr. Nancy Messonnier of the Centers for Disease Control and Prevention warned on February 25 that the COVID-19 pandemic may become a pandemic. Moody's Analytics says there is a 40% chance of a U.S. recession in the first half of 2020 and the virus may set off a worldwide economic recession. It has already sidetracked a U.S.-China trade agreement, slowed tourism, and caused a 2,000-point (6.5%) drop in the Dow. The Trump administration is criticized for its handling of a response. On March 6, President Trump signed the $8.3 billion Coronavirus Preparedness and Response bill. 44,183 COVID-19 cases and 544 deaths are reported in the United States on March 23, 2020.

Government response to the pandemic became a major issue during the 2020 elections, with Democrats generally advocating for the caution (mask wearing, virtual campaigns, social distancing, and limited economic opening) and Republicans often advocating for a fully-open economy while ignoring mask wearing and social distancing; large, live rallies and other public events were a hallmark of the Trump reelection campaign.

A summer surge in infections affected mostly the South and the West; another surge after Labor Day when college students returned to school was exasperated by Thanksgiving travel and celebrations. By early December, there were 14 million infections and 280,000 deaths, as many localities such as Iowa expressed concern about staff shortages.

Despite Trump's promise to deliver twenty million doses of the two vaccines approved by the FDA just before Christmas, by December 30 only 2.6 million people, mostly frontline COVID-19 health workers, had received the first dose. Observers blame poor planning and a lack of money for distribution.

==== Financing health care ====
House Speaker Nancy Pelosi says that in 2020, Democrats will prioritize getting bills such as the "Lower Drug Costs Now Act" signed into law. Increasing health care is a priority for 2020 Democratic presidential candidates, although there are large differences in how to go about it.

President-elect Joe Biden ran on preserving and expanding the Affordable Care Act by adding a public option. His ability to do depends on control of the United States Senate. The Supreme Court of the United States (SCOTUS) is generally expected to uphold the law, following a hearing on November 10, 2020. Attempts by the states to expand coverage are hampered by tight budgets related to high unemployment and the high cost of dealing with the COVID-19 pandemic.

==== Opioid epidemic ====
Mother Jones reports that Johns Hopkins University researchers have concluded that lax oversight by the Food and Drug Administration is hampering efforts to ensure that opioids such as OxyContin are not overprescribed. This despite Trump Administration claims that addressing opioid misuse is a top priority. A March 25, 2020 report by ProPublica revealed that Walmart used its political influence with the Trump administration to avoid criminal prosecution for over-dispensing opioids in Texas.

=== Impeachment ===
Following the December 2019 House impeachment vote, Speaker Nancy Pelosi announced she would restrain from delivering the acts of impeachment to the Senate until Majority Leader Mitch McConnell explained the trial procedures. Pelosi indicated she would release the articles the week of January 13, after former National Security Advisor John Bolton indicated he would testify if subpoenaed, and unredacted emails from the Department of Defense (DOD) relevant to the Ukraine investigation were released. On January 15, the U.S. House of Representatives sent the impeachment resolutions to the Senate for trial. On February 5, 2020, the Senate acquitted Trump on both counts. The votes were 52–48 to acquit on the first count and 53–47 to acquit on the second count. The votes were sharply divided along party lines.

=== Marijuana policy ===
On the federal level, there is increased pressure to liberalize marijuana laws, such as bills to reclassify marijuana from a Schedule I to a Schedule III drug. Illinois legalized recreational use of marijuana starting January 1, and other states are expected to legalize marijuana and/or liberalize existing laws in 2020. In December 2019, Politico reported that 21 of 27 presidential candidates support legalization, five want the states to decide the issue, and one (Joe Biden) has called for decriminalization of marijuana.

The Democratic-controlled United States House of Representatives voted to legalize marijuana at the federal level on December 4, but the Republican-controlled Senate is expected to block it.

=== Online privacy rules / Social media ===
In December 2019, members of the Senate Committee on Commerce announced sweeping new proposals for federal laws to protect online privacy.

In response to the coronavirus pandemic, Apple Inc. and Google are collaborating on technology to create smartphone apps that would help identify people who have crossed paths with a contagious person and alert them. Privacy advocates are skeptical.

President Trump and other conservatives have often complained about the unproven bias liberal of social media, particularly as Trump's false and misleading statements became more outrageous and more common. Trump vetoed the Defense authorization bill because it did not repeal Section 230 of Internet legislation, which provides immunity for website publishers from third-party content. Senator Mitch McConnell (R-KY) used the same excuse to block the approval of $2,000/person in COVID-19 relief in December.

=== Presidential Election ===
There were 14 candidates for the Democratic presidential nomination; four women (Elizabeth Warren, Amy Klobuchar, Tulsi Gabbard, and Marianne Williamson) and four people of color (Andrew Yang, Cory Booker, Gabbard, and Deval Patrick. Joe Biden, Bernie Sanders, and Warren lead in national polling. Biden, Sanders, Warren, Pete Buttigieg, and Klobuchar have qualified for the 7th debate on January 14 at Drake University in Des Moines, Iowa.

Bernie Sanders was the early leader in the race for the Democratic nomination, but Joe Biden won big in the South Carolina Democratic primary, which led to Buttigieg and Klobuchar dropping out and endorsing him the night before the Super Tuesday primaries (March 3). Biden swept the South and surged ahead in delegates; Sanders won the West; the other candidates all dropped out, except for Tulsi Gabbard (who had won two delegates from American Samoa). Biden extended his lead after the March 10 primaries.

The coronavirus pandemic changed electioneering. Sanders and Biden canceled live rallies starting March 10, while forums and fund-raising events moved on-line. Louisiana and Georgia postponed their primaries, and Wyoming changed to a mail-in system. Other states are considering similar moves, and the March 15 Biden-Sanders televised debate is the only campaign event scheduled. A poll taken by The Hill-HarrisX on May 27–28 indicated that 53% of registered voters said they would feel "somewhat" or "very" comfortable voting in person, compared to 47% who said they'd be uncomfortable.

Former Vice President Joe Biden was nominated at a virtual convention on August 19. California Senator Kamala Harris was chosen as his running mate. President Donald Trump was formally nominated at a convention held at the White House on August 24.

The Associated Press and major television networks declared Biden the winner of the election on November 7. Trump refused to concede and baselessly alleged massive voter fraud, filing dozens of frivolous lawsuits: all but one minor procedural matter were soundly rejected by the courts.

=== Racism and police brutality ===
Racial tensions came to a peak on May 25, 2020, when 46-year-old George Floyd was murdered by police following his arrest in Minneapolis, Minnesota. Protests soon broke out across the United States and around the world. Activists are calling for police reforms and some have called for defunding or abolishing the police. Some jurisdictions have approved changes. The debate about Confederate flag displays, statues, and places named for racist leaders has reopened.

=== State and local issues ===
During 2019, ten states moved toward ensuring abortion rights, while eleven passed laws to restrict legal abortions.

Illinois legalized recreational use of marijuana on January 1, and other states are expected to reform marijuana laws in 2020. Voters in Arizona, Montana, New Jersey, and South Dakota approved legalization of marijuana in the November 3 elections. Oregon went a step further and decriminalized small amounts of hard drugs like cocaine, methamphetamine, and heroin.

California's fight for workers' rights is being challenged by ride-sharing and food-delivery companies Uber, Postmates, Lyft, and DoorDash. 21 states and 26 local jurisdictions raised their minimum wage laws on January 1, many to $15/hour. Voters approved the measure, 58.6% to 41.4%.

New York State implemented justice reforms by eliminating cash bail for many offenses. Utah voted to eliminate slavery as a form of punishment in a November 3 ballot measure.

Red flag laws go into effect on January 1 in Colorado, Nevada, and Hawaii. Following the 2019 Virginia elections, major gun control legislation is expected in that state in 2020. According to Gun Owners of America, 200 counties, cities, and towns in 19 states have passed 2nd Amendment sanctuary ordinances. The Senate of Virginia passed several gun-control laws on January 16, days before a planned pro-gun rally was planned in Richmond.

Dozens of state issues were decided by referendum during the 2020 general elections. Mississippi adopted a new state flag, rejecting its Confederate heritage. California extended data privacy laws and Florida raised its minimum wage to $15/hour.

=== Technology ===
The introduction of new 5G wireless technology caused major public discussion about possible security risks and safety risks. Many experts said 5G would require new methods to ensure the security of data. The US Congress passed legislation regarding security concerns about 5G networks. The federal government prohibited the use of Huawei equipment for 5G networks due to security concerns and encouraged its allies to also do so as well. The US government imposed strict controls on US companies as to their ability to do business with Huawei, thus disrupting sales of Huawei phones overseas. Chinese vendors and the Chinese government have denied these claims. Huawei submitted a petition in the United States Court of Appeals for the Fifth Circuit against the FCC's decision to prohibit rural U.S. network providers from using equipment from the China-based vendor due to national security concerns, asking that the recent FCC order be overturned.

The development of technology has elicited various responses and concerns that 5G radiation could have adverse health effects. An editorial in the scientific magazine Scientific American emphasized that complete scientific research regarding its effects have not been conducted and that there could be health risks. Wired characterized fears that the technology could cause cancer, infertility, autism, Alzheimer's, and mysterious bird deaths as "conspiracy theory". The US FCC and nearly all other regulators claim 5G radiation will have no significant health effects.

The United States is no longer the world's leader in science and engineering, according to a report by the National Science Foundation (NSF). Federal government spending on research has fallen steadily since 2000, and the U.S. total contribution to research and development has fallen to 25%, compared to 33% for China. Women hold 29% and minorities 13.3% of jobs in science and engineering. The U.S. still leads in the granting of doctorates in science and engineering.

=== World trade ===
==== US-China Trade Dispute ====
A trade dispute between the US and China caused economic concerns worldwide. In December 2019, various US officials said a trade deal was likely before a proposed round of new tariffs took effect on December 15, 2019. US tariffs had a negative effect on China's economy, which slowed to growth of 6%. In December 2019, new deal was announced regarding US-China trade dispute. Farmers are skeptical of the proposed new deal, as it would require China to double the farm purchases made before the trade war started. President Trump signed an initial trade deal worth $200 billion with China on January 15.

==== United States–Mexico–Canada Agreement ====
The United States–Mexico–Canada Agreement is a signed but not ratified free trade agreement between Canada, Mexico, and the United States. The Agreement is the result of a 2017–2018 renegotiation of the North American Free Trade Agreement (NAFTA) by its member states. Negotiations "focused largely on auto exports, steel and aluminum tariffs, and the dairy, egg, and poultry markets." One provision "prevents any party from passing laws that restrict the cross-border flow of data". Compared to NAFTA, USMCA increases environmental and labour regulations, and incentivizes more domestic production of cars and trucks. The agreement also provides updated intellectual property protections, gives the United States more access to Canada's dairy market, imposes a quota for Canadian and Mexican automotive production, and increases the duty-free limit for Canadians who buy U.S. goods online from $20 to $150. Mexico and the U.S. House ratified the treaty in December 2019; the U.S. Senate ratified it in January 2020. Environmentalists argue the treaty does not go far enough. The Parliament of Canada ratified the agreement on March 13 before going on recess because of the coronavirus pandemic.

== See also ==
=== Country overviews ===
- United States
- History of United States
- History of modern United States
- Outline of United States
- Government of United States
- Politics of United States
- Years in United States
- Timeline of United States history
- 2020s in United States political history

=== Related timelines for current period ===
- 2020
- 2020 in politics and government
- 2020 in the United States
- 2020 in United Kingdom politics and government
- 2020s

=== Specific situations and issues ===
- Impeachment of Donald Trump
- COVID-19 pandemic in the United States
  - COVID-19 pandemic in Washington (state)
  - COVID-19 pandemic in New York (state)
