= National Defense Authorization Act for Fiscal Year 2021 =

United States federal law

William M. (Mac) Thornberry National Defense Authorization Act for Fiscal Year 2021
- Long title: An Act to authorize appropriations for fiscal year 2021 for military activities of the Department of Defense, for military construction, and for defense activities of the Department of Energy, to prescribe military personnel strengths for such fiscal year, and for other purposes.
- Enacted by: the 116th United States Congress

Citations
- Public law: Pub. L. 116–283 (text) (PDF)

Legislative history
- Introduced in the House as H.R. 6395 by Adam Smith (D-WA) on March 26, 2020; Committee consideration by House Armed Services; Passed the House on July 21, 2020 (295–125); Passed the Senate with amendment on November 16, 2020 (voice vote); Reported by the joint conference committee on December 3, 2020; agreed to by the House on December 8, 2020 (335–78) and by the Senate on December 11, 2020 (84–13); Vetoed by President Donald Trump on December 23, 2020; Overridden by the House on December 28, 2020 (322–87); Overridden by the Senate and became law on January 1, 2021 (81–13)

The William M. (Mac) Thornberry National Defense Authorization Act for Fiscal Year 2021 (NDAA 2021) is a United States federal law which specifies the budget, expenditures and policies of the U.S. Department of Defense (DoD) for fiscal year 2021. Analogous NDAAs have been passed annually for 59 years. The act is named in honor of Representative Mac Thornberry, who served as either the chair or the ranking member of the House Armed Services Committee. Thornberry retired from Congress at the end of the congressional session.

The $740 billion bill includes pay raises for America's soldiers, modernizations for equipment, and provisions to require more scrutiny before troops are withdrawn from Germany or Afghanistan. President Donald Trump had threatened to veto the bill because it did not include a repeal of 1996 legislation shielding internet companies from being liable for what is posted on their websites by third parties. The bill also includes a provision to limit the president's use of emergency declarations to divert military construction funds to finance the expansion of the Mexico–United States barrier. Another provision within the act would require the military to rename bases that were named after figures from the Confederacy. The act also contains multiple anti-money laundering provisions and effectively bans anonymous shell companies.

The bill passed both the House and Senate with veto-proof majorities on December 11, 2020. On December 23, President Trump vetoed the bill. The House and Senate voted on December 28, 2020, and January 1, 2021, respectively, to override the veto; this was the only veto override of Trump's first presidency and, as of June 2026, is the most recent veto override.

== Provisions ==
=== Corporate Transparency Act ===
The bill also contains numerous anti-money laundering provisions. The Corporate Transparency Act introduces a requirement for companies to disclose their ultimate beneficial owners to the Financial Crimes Enforcement Network (FinCEN), thus effectively banning anonymous shell corporations. The act also strengthened anti-money laundering regulations for the antiquities trade. The deadline to disclose beneficial ownership was January 1, 2025.

The act generated opposition from many small businesses, who saw it as additional and burdensome red tape and government intrusion on privacy. On December 3, 2024, less than a month before the deadline, Judge Amos Mazzant in the U.S. District Court for the Eastern District of Texas issued a nationwide preliminary injunction against the act in Texas Top Cop Shop, et al. v. Garland, et al., stating that the act is "likely unconstitutional." On December 26, 2024, the U.S. Court of Appeals for the Fifth Circuit affirmed the district court's injunction. The Department of Justice appealed the decision to the U.S. Supreme Court. On January 23, 2025, the Supreme Court ruled that the Government can enforce the CTA while the Fifth Circuit Court reviews the law.

On March 2, 2025, the US Department of the Treasury (USDT) announced it would simply not enforce the federal law at all. The USDT officially repealed its implementation of the act in August 2026.

=== Other provisions ===
The $740.5 billion bill authorizes $636.4 billion for the Pentagon's base budget, $25.9 billion for national security programs within the Department of Energy, and $69 billion for the Overseas Contingency Operations account, a war fund that is not subject to budget caps. As an authorization bill, these amounts are non-binding.

The bill also includes a provision to limit the use of emergency declarations to divert military construction funds to an annual $100 million.

The National Artificial Intelligence Initiative Act of 2020 (division E) aims to establish a coordinated federal initiative to advance artificial intelligence (AI) research, development, and adoption in the United States. Key components of the AIIA include the creation of a National AI Initiative Office for coordinating federal AI activities, the establishment of National AI Research Institutes for multi-disciplinary research, and the formation of a National AI Advisory Committee to provide expert advice. It also authorizes significant funding for AI research, emphasizes international collaboration, and supports AI education and workforce development initiatives. Furthermore, the act addresses ethical considerations and AI safety, promoting research on AI ethics, transparency, and robustness to ensure responsible deployment of AI systems.

The bill also included an amendment originally offered by Senator Jim Inhofe (R-OK) in the Senate version with a limited ban on the transfer of bayonets, grenades, weaponized tracked combat vehicles, and weaponized drones to police departments, as well as requiring law enforcement to be trained in de-escalation and citizens' constitutional rights.

The bill banned federal research funding to any college or university which hosts a Confucius Institute.

The bill includes a provision creating a Commission on the Naming of Items of the Department of Defense that Commemorate the Confederate States of America or Any Person Who Served Voluntarily with the Confederate States of America to develop a plan to "remove all names, symbols, displays, monuments, and paraphernalia that honor or commemorate the Confederate States of America (commonly referred to as the "Confederacy") or any person who served voluntarily with the Confederate States of America from all assets of the Department of Defense."

== Legislative history ==
=== Passage ===
Senator Mitt Romney's (R-UT) amendment to restrict President Trump's ability to reduce U.S. military presence in Germany failed. Senator Jeff Merkley's (D-OR) amendment requiring federal law enforcement uniforms to identify an individual and their agency, limit their activities to federal property and the immediate surrounding area unless a governor or mayor requests more assistance and to publicly disclose the number of personnel deployed and what activities they are carrying out did not get a vote. The Senate voted 23–77 against a proposal by Senator Bernie Sanders (I-VT) to reduce the defense budget by $74 billion.

The House of Representatives passed its version of the bill with a veto-proof 295–125 vote on July 21, 2020. Two days later, the Senate passed its version of the bill (S. 4049) 86–14. The final version of the bill was agreed on by the House on December 8, 2020, and the Senate on December 11, 2020.

=== Veto ===
The bill was presented to President Trump on December 11, who vetoed it on December 23, because it renames military bases that honor Confederate officers, and because it does not repeal Section 230 of the 1996 Communications Decency Act, which shields internet companies from being liable for what is posted on their websites by third parties.

==== Veto override ====
The House of Representatives voted 322–87 to override the president's veto on December 28. After Majority Leader Mitch McConnell said the Senate would vote on December 30 on whether to override the president's veto, Senators Sanders (I-VT) and Josh Hawley (R-MO) said they would delay this using a filibuster, in hopes of forcing a vote on the CASH Act (which would increase stimulus check amounts). The motion in the Senate to take a vote on a veto override passed 80–12 on December 30, followed by cloture by Senator McConnell, preventing further debate. The Senate voted 81–13 to override the veto on January 1, 2021.

== Original proposals ==
The bill approved by the House included a provision to require the executive to consult with Congress before invoking the Insurrection Act of 1807, and blocked appropriations from being used for nuclear testing. It also included an amendment introduced by Rep. Tulsi Gabbard (D-HI) and passed by the House 336–71 which "would let soldiers use cannabis derivatives like CBD", and would have reversed the Department of Defense's policy against cannabis derivatives if it became law. The cannabis-related changes were not retained in the enrolled bill passed by both houses of Congress. It also called for the establishment of a commission to rename military assets that honor Confederate officers.

The act failed to include the Creating Helpful Incentives to Produce Semiconductors for America (CHIPS) Act, which aims to promote semiconductor research, development and manufacturing.

== See also ==
- Consolidated Appropriations Act, 2021 for the Intelligence Authorization Act for Fiscal Year 2021 (IAA 2021)
- National Defense Authorization Act
- Military budget of the United States
- 2020 in United States politics and government
