= 2020 Tennessee Republican presidential primary =

- March 3, 2020

58 Republican National Convention delegates

Candidate	Donald Trump	Uncommitted
Home state	Florida	N/A
Delegate count	58	0
Popular vote	384,266	5,948
Percentage	96.47%	1.49%

Trump
>90%

The 2020 Tennessee Republican presidential primary took place on March 3, 2020, as one of fourteen contests scheduled for Super Tuesday in the Republican Party presidential primaries for the 2020 presidential election.

== Results ==
Incumbent United States President Donald Trump was challenged by two candidates: former congressman Joe Walsh of Illinois, and former governor Bill Weld of Massachusetts. Walsh withdrew from the race prior to the primary. There was also an uncommitted option on the ballot. Trump won the state in a landslide victory over Walsh and Weld.

2020 Tennessee Republican primary
Candidate	Votes	%	Estimated delegates
Donald Trump	384,266	96.47	58
Joe Walsh (withdrawn)	4,178	1.05	0
Bill Weld	3,922	0.98	0
Uncommitted	5,948	1.49	0
Total	398,314	100%	58

=== Results by county ===
2020 Tennessee Republican primary (results per county)
County	Donald Trump		Joe Walsh		Bill Weld		Uncommitted		Total votes cast
County	Votes	%	Votes	%	Votes	%	Votes	%	Total votes cast
Anderson	4,281	96.96	34	0.77	63	1.43	37	0.84	4,415
Bedford	2,678	98.71	6	0.22	11	0.41	18	0.66	2,713
Benton	1,083	98.99	5	0.46	2	0.18	4	0.37	1,094
Bledsoe	906	99.02	2	0.22	3	0.33	4	0.44	915
Blount	10,701	95.37	163	1.45	110	0.98	247	2.20	11,221
Bradley	8,394	98.01	66	0.77	51	0.60	53	0.62	8,564
Campbell	1,941	98.23	5	0.25	21	1.06	9	0.46	1,976
Cannon	931	98.73	3	0.32	3	0.32	6	0.64	943
Carroll	1,648	98.68	12	0.72	6	0.36	4	0.24	1,670
Carter	4,468	97.60	40	0.87	23	0.50	47	1.03	4,578
Cheatham	2,043	97.66	14	0.67	18	0.86	17	0.81	2,092
Chester	1,365	97.71	6	0.43	6	0.43	20	1.43	1,397
Claiborne	2,003	98.48	13	0.64	9	0.44	9	0.44	2,034
Clay	394	97.04	4	0.99	4	0.99	4	0.99	406
Cocke	3,502	97.36	27	0.75	26	0.72	42	1.17	3,597
Coffee	5,339	94.36	92	1.63	50	0.88	177	3.13	5,658
Crockett	1,109	98.49	7	0.62	2	0.18	8	0.71	1,126
Cumberland	8,923	96.32	124	1.34	55	0.59	162	1.75	9,264
Davidson	15,375	94.97	205	1.27	358	2.21	252	1.56	16,190
Decatur	738	98.27	3	0.40	6	0.80	4	0.53	751
DeKalb	939	98.63	2	0.21	3	0.32	8	0.84	952
Dickson	2,444	98.07	18	0.72	10	0.40	20	0.80	2,492
Dyer	2,092	98.87	9	0.43	10	0.47	5	0.24	2,116
Fayette	3,089	98.60	15	0.48	17	0.54	12	0.38	3,133
Fentress	1,446	98.77	7	0.48	7	0.48	4	0.27	1,464
Franklin	3,770	96.87	43	1.10	28	0.72	51	1.31	3,892
Gibson	2,745	98.81	11	0.40	8	0.29	14	0.50	2,778
Giles	1,854	98.93	9	0.48	7	0.37	4	0.21	1,874
Grainger	2,495	96.93	38	1.48	25	0.97	16	0.62	2,574
Greene	5,218	97.81	34	0.64	29	0.54	54	1.01	5,335
Grundy	1,048	98.59	3	0.28	6	0.56	6	0.56	1,063
Hamblen	5,464	96.42	77	1.36	33	0.58	93	1.64	5,667
Hamilton	23,661	95.22	296	1.19	296	1.19	597	2.40	24,850
Hancock	546	97.15	4	0.71	5	0.89	7	1.25	562
Hardeman	974	98.78	4	0.41	5	0.51	3	0.30	986
Hardin	1,984	98.36	15	0.74	12	0.59	6	0.30	2,017
Hawkins	4,154	98.23	26	0.61	23	0.54	26	0.61	4,229
Haywood	548	98.56	3	0.54	2	0.36	3	0.54	556
Henderson	3,314	96.53	40	1.17	22	0.64	57	1.66	3,433
Henry	2,345	98.61	13	0.55	10	0.42	10	0.42	2,378
Hickman	1,243	98.34	5	0.40	10	0.79	6	0.47	1,264
Houston	477	97.95	2	0.41	3	0.62	5	1.03	487
Humphreys	1,043	97.93	7	0.66	6	0.56	9	0.85	1,065
Jackson	691	99.14	2	0.29	1	0.14	3	0.43	697
Jefferson	4,130	96.88	49	1.15	44	1.03	40	0.94	4,263
Johnson	1,443	98.03	10	0.68	9	0.61	10	0.68	1,472
Knox	32,978	92.62	709	1.99	727	2.04	1,192	3.35	35,606
Lake	297	98.67	2	0.66	1	0.33	1	0.33	301
Lauderdale	1,055	98.60	8	0.75	2	0.19	5	0.47	1,070
Lawrence	2,225	98.67	12	0.53	11	0.49	7	0.31	2,255
Lewis	846	98.72	4	0.47	2	0.23	5	0.58	857
Lincoln	3,192	98.58	10	0.31	20	0.62	16	0.49	3,238
Loudon	6,061	96.19	60	0.95	67	1.06	113	1.79	6,301
Macon	2,018	97.77	18	0.87	12	0.58	16	0.78	2,064
Madison	4,446	97.84	34	0.75	27	0.59	37	0.81	4,544
Marion	2,130	97.98	11	0.51	12	0.55	21	0.97	2,174
Marshall	1,741	98.20	11	0.62	9	0.51	12	0.68	1,773
Maury	6,061	97.30	43	0.69	42	0.67	83	1.33	6,229
McMinn	5,539	96.77	67	1.17	41	0.72	77	1.35	5,724
McNairy	1,738	99.09	7	0.40	7	0.40	2	0.11	1,754
Meigs	1,668	95.70	29	1.66	15	0.86	31	1.78	1,743
Monroe	4,359	97.91	31	0.70	26	0.58	36	0.81	4,452
Montgomery	9,011	95.24	151	1.60	94	0.99	205	2.17	9,461
Moore	653	99.09	4	0.61	2	0.30	0	0.00	659
Morgan	1,369	98.70	11	0.79	4	0.29	3	0.22	1,387
Obion	2,118	99.16	5	0.23	8	0.37	5	0.23	2,136
Overton	1,271	98.45	10	0.77	4	0.31	6	0.46	1,291
Perry	467	98.11	3	0.63	2	0.42	4	0.84	476
Pickett	617	96.86	4	0.63	3	0.47	13	2.04	637
Polk	1,835	98.34	10	0.54	9	0.48	12	0.64	1,866
Putnam	4,266	97.78	38	0.87	17	0.39	42	0.96	4,363
Rhea	2,456	97.11	26	1.03	13	0.51	34	1.34	2,529
Roane	3,963	97.85	24	0.59	35	0.86	28	0.69	4,050
Robertson	3,530	97.95	28	0.78	23	0.64	23	0.64	3,604
Rutherford	14,792	96.72	161	1.05	145	0.95	196	1.28	15,294
Scott	1,081	99.17	4	0.37	4	0.37	1	0.09	1,090
Sequatchie	958	98.06	4	0.41	8	0.82	7	0.72	977
Sevier	7,018	97.36	60	0.83	59	0.82	71	0.99	7,208
Shelby	21,282	96.12	260	1.17	274	1.24	326	1.47	22,142
Smith	3,057	96.07	44	1.38	19	0.60	62	1.95	3,182
Stewart	982	98.00	5	0.50	4	0.40	11	1.10	1,002
Sullivan	8,081	97.41	74	0.89	69	0.83	72	0.87	8,296
Sumner	9,870	97.44	94	0.93	87	0.86	78	0.77	10,129
Tipton	3,674	98.24	28	0.75	21	0.56	17	0.45	3,740
Trousdale	481	98.77	1	0.21	2	0.41	3	0.62	487
Unicoi	1,991	97.89	13	0.64	8	0.39	22	1.08	2,034
Union	1,101	98.04	8	0.71	7	0.62	7	0.62	1,123
Van Buren	391	99.24	1	0.25	2	0.51	0	0.00	394
Warren	1,968	98.35	17	0.85	11	0.55	5	0.25	2,001
Washington	9,871	95.37	155	1.50	131	1.27	193	1.86	10,350
Wayne	1,119	99.29	4	0.35	1	0.09	3	0.27	1,127
Weakley	1,900	98.14	8	0.41	11	0.57	17	0.88	1,936
White	2,135	98.21	9	0.41	7	0.32	23	1.06	2,174
Williamson	15,483	95.92	137	0.85	239	1.48	283	1.75	16,142
Wilson	12,142	95.31	148	1.16	120	0.94	329	2.58	12,739
Total	384,266	96.47	4,178	1.05	3,922	0.98	5,948	1.49	398,314

== See also ==
- 2020 Tennessee Democratic presidential primary
- 2020 United States presidential election
- 2020 United States presidential election in Tennessee
- 2020 Tennessee elections
