= Amer Fakhoury Foundation =

American non-profit organization

- Formation: 2019
- Type: Non-profit organization
- Legal status: Active
- Headquarters: Dover, New Hampshire
- Website: amerfoundation.org

The Amer Fakhoury Foundation is an American 501(c)(3) human rights organization based in Dover, New Hampshire, that works for U.S. citizens forcefully detained in other countries.

== History ==
Amer Fakhoury, a restaurant owner in Dover, New Hampshire and former South Lebanon Army commander of the notorious Khiam prison, fled Lebanon in 2000 and relocated in the United States due to war and turmoil. Prior to his arrival in Lebanon, he was sentenced to death in absentia for his collaboration with Israel. In September 2019, he travelled to Lebanon on a family vacation. His passport was seized, and he was accused of decades-old murder and torture charges, allegedly during the Israeli occupation of Southern Lebanon when he was commander at the prison known for human rights abuses, kidnapping, torture and murder. His actions earned Fakhoury the nickname, "The Butcher of Khiam." Following threats from the U.S. of economic sanctions, he was released on 19 March 2020, and returned to the US, where he died in August 2020.

The Amer Fakhoury Foundation was established by the family of Fakhoury in 2019. The goal of the organization is to be a support network for people like their father and their families. The organization held a Washington DC protest and paid for all the families of hostages. The protest was featured in a documentary about hostages in The Washington Post. In 2021, Fakhoury's four daughters went to Washington, where they met with State Department officials and US Senator Ted Cruz, a Texas Republican who had worked with New Hampshire Democrat Jeanne Shaheen on a bill to ban visas and freeze assets of Lebanese officials involved in Fakhoury's detention.

The foundation also organized a demonstration outside the White House in 2021 for the multiple Texas families to call on the Biden administration to bring their relatives and others home from detainment in Russia, Venezuela, Rwanda, Syria, and elsewhere.
