= 2020 Tennessee Democratic presidential primary =

- March 3, 2020

73 delegates (64 pledged, 9 unpledged) to the Democratic National Convention The number of pledged delegates won is determined by the popular vote

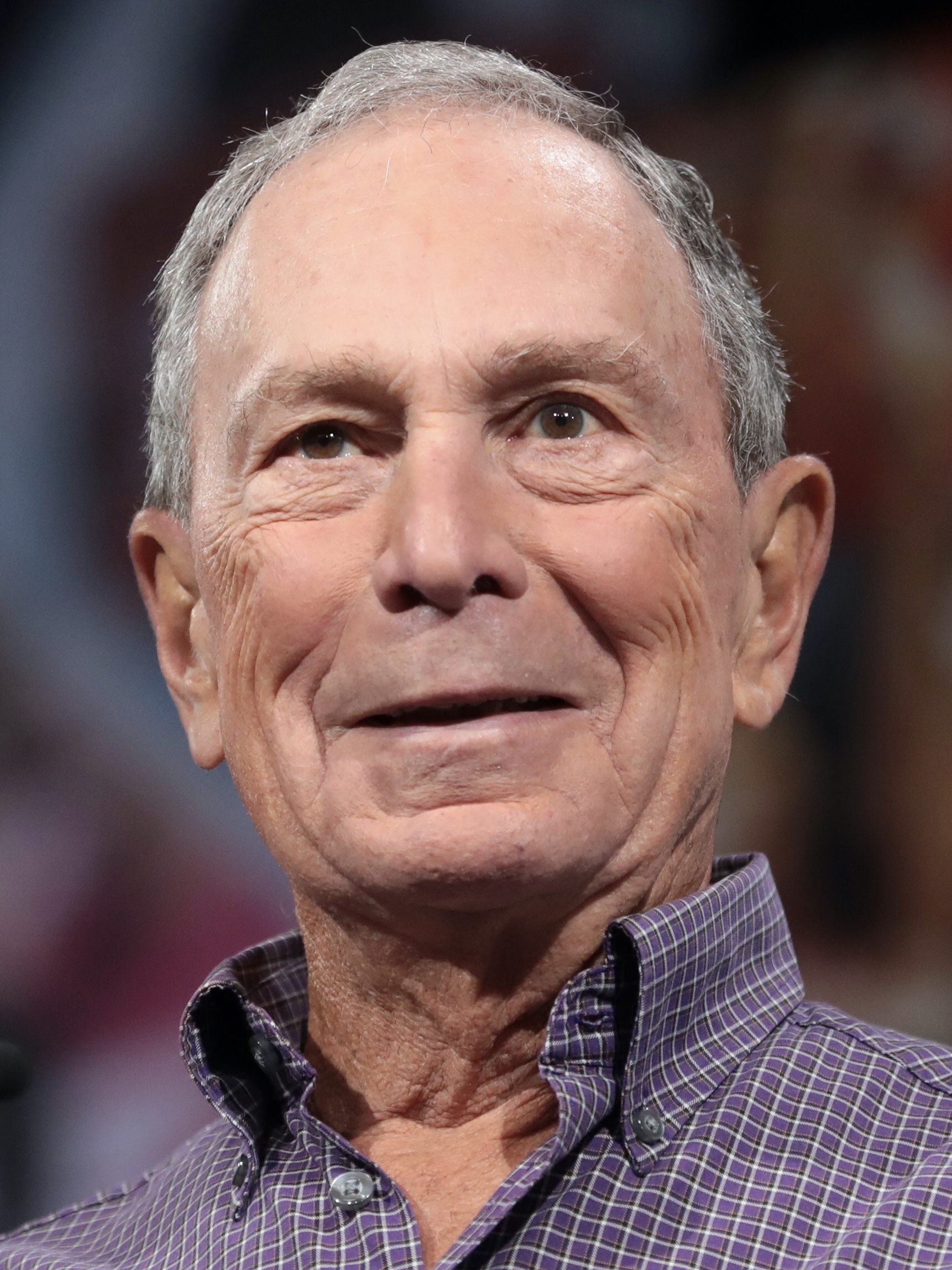

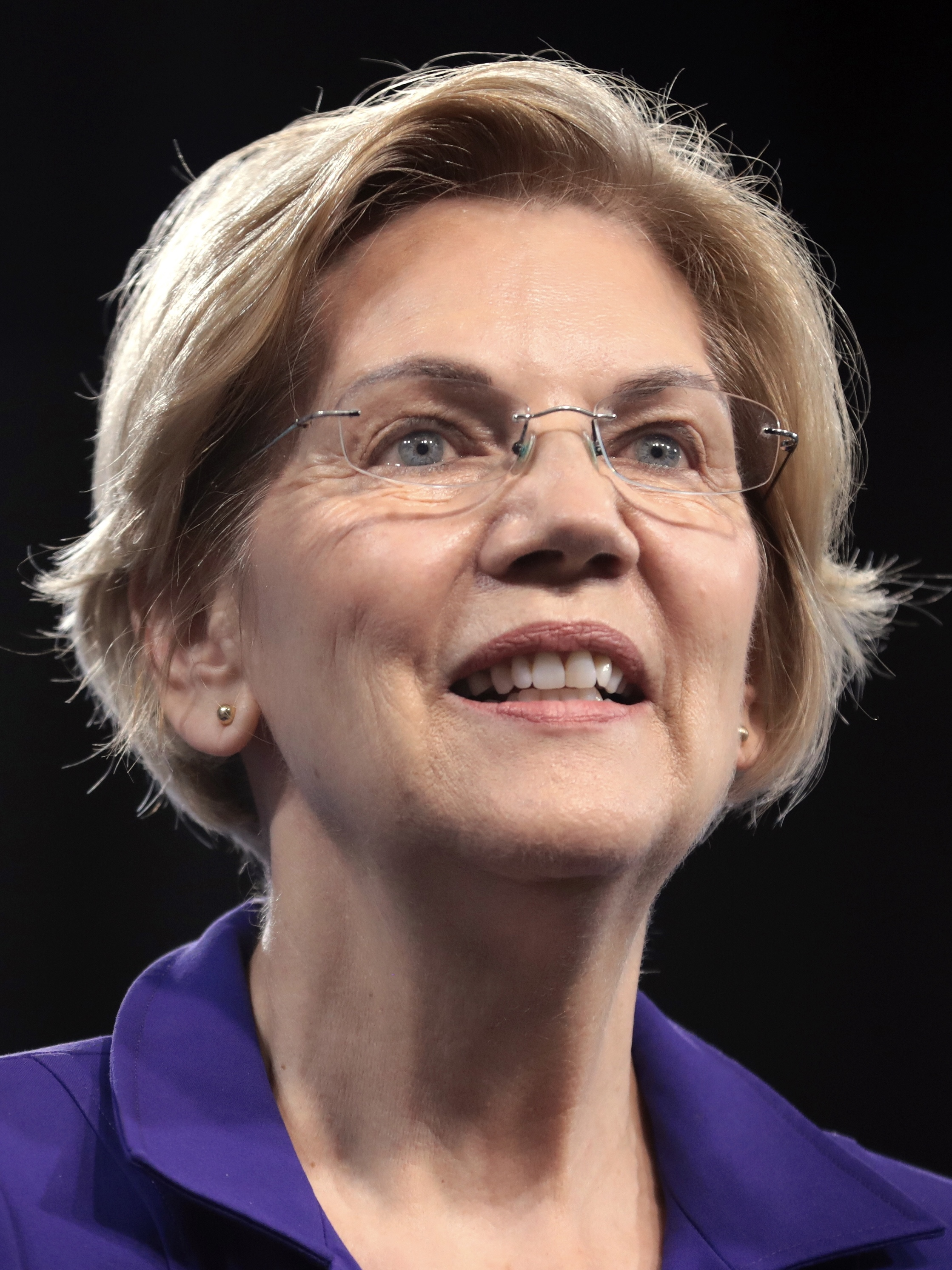
Candidate	Joe Biden	Bernie Sanders
Home state	Delaware	Vermont
Delegate count	36 (Note: 33 delegates, if Bloomberg's statewide delegates would have been calculated.)	22 (Note: 20 delegates, if Bloomberg's statewide delegates would have been calculated.)
Popular vote	215,390	129,168
Percentage	41.72%	25.02%
Candidate	Michael Bloomberg	Elizabeth Warren
Home state	New York	Massachusetts
Delegate count	5 (Note: 10 delegates, if Bloomberg's statewide delegates would have been calculated.)	1
Popular vote	79,789	53,732
Percentage	15.46%	10.41%

Biden
30 – 40%
40 – 50%
50 – 60%
60 – 70%
Sanders
30 – 40%

Pledged national convention delegates
Type	Del.	Type	Del.
CD1	4	CD6	4
CD2	4	CD7	5
CD3	4	CD8	4
CD4	4	CD9	7
CD5	6	CD9	7
PLEO	8	At-large	14
Total pledged delegates			64

The 2020 Tennessee Democratic presidential primary took place on March 3, 2020, as one of 15 contests scheduled on Super Tuesday in the Democratic Party primaries for the 2020 presidential election, following the South Carolina primary the weekend before. The Tennessee primary was an open primary, with the state awarding 73 delegates towards the 2020 Democratic National Convention, of which 64 were pledged delegates allocated on the basis of the results of the primary.

Former vice president Joe Biden easily decided the primary, winning almost 42% of the vote and 36 delegates and benefitting from overwhelming African-American support, as well as rural support among predominantly white working-class voters. Senator Bernie Sanders took 25% of the vote gaining 22 delegates, while former mayor Michael Bloomberg reached the threshold with slightly more than 15% but was not allocated any statewide delegates due to his withdrawal the next day. Otherwise Biden would have had 33 delegates, Sanders 20 delegates and Bloomberg 10 delegates. Senator Elizabeth Warren received a single district delegate.

== Procedure ==
Tennessee was one of 14 states and one territory holding primaries on March 3, 2020, also known as "Super Tuesday". Voting was expected to take place throughout the state from 7:00 a.m. until 8:00 p.m. in the parts of the state in the Eastern Time Zone, and from 8:00 a.m. to 7:00 p.m. in parts of the state in the Central Time Zone. Polls closed simultaneously throughout the state, though specific opening times were set by each county, and were allowed to open as late as 9:00 a.m. in some parts of the state. The night before the primary, a line of severe storms swept across Tennessee, with several large tornadoes hitting communities across the state, the worst of which were two tornadoes in the Nashville area that killed an estimated 25 people and caused catastrophic damage, including knocking out power to tens of thousands and destroying numerous homes and businesses. A state of emergency was declared statewide. Some polling places in the hardest hit areas were closed, while others stayed open late.

In the open primary, candidates had to meet a threshold of 15 percent at the congressional district or statewide level in order to be considered viable. The 64 pledged delegates to the 2020 Democratic National Convention were allocated proportionally on the basis of the results of the primary. Of these, between 4 and 7 were allocated to each of the state's 9 congressional districts and another 8 were allocated to party leaders and elected officials (PLEO delegates), in addition to 14 at-large delegates. The Super Tuesday primary as part of Stage I on the primary timetable received no bonus delegates, in order to disperse the primaries between more different date clusters and keep too many states from hoarding on the first shared date or on a March date in general.

Following county conventions on March 7, 2020, which designated delegates to the district conventions, the district conventions were held on March 21, 2020 (via teleconferencing due to the COVID-19 pandemic) and selected national convention district delegates. Afterwards, the state executive committee convened on April 18, 2020, to vote on the 14 at-large and 8 pledged PLEO delegates for the Democratic National Convention. The delegation also included 9 unpledged PLEO delegates: 6 members of the Democratic National Committee, 2 representatives from Congress, and former vice president Al Gore.

== Candidates ==
The following candidates filed and were on the ballot in Tennessee:

Running

- Joe Biden
- Michael Bloomberg
- Tulsi Gabbard
- Bernie Sanders
- Elizabeth Warren

Withdrawn

- Michael Bennet
- Cory Booker
- Pete Buttigieg (Note: Candidate withdrew shortly before the primary, after early voting started.)
- Julian Castro
- John Delaney
- Amy Klobuchar
- Deval Patrick
- Tom Steyer
- Marianne Williamson
- Andrew Yang

There was also an uncommitted option on the ballot.

== Polling ==
Polling Aggregation
Source of poll aggregation	Date updated	Dates polled	Joe Biden	Bernie Sanders	Michael Bloomberg	Elizabeth Warren	Tulsi Gabbard	Other/ Undecided (Note: Calculated by taking the difference of 100% and all other candidates combined)
270 to Win	March 3, 2020	February 28–March 2, 2020	31.0%	27.0%	18.5%	12.0%	0.5%	11.0%
RealClear Politics	March 3, 2020	Insufficient recent polling to supply an average.						
FiveThirtyEight	March 3, 2020	until March 2, 2020 (Note: FiveThirtyEight aggregates polls with a trendline regression of polls rather than a strict average of recent polls.)	29.0%	24.7%	15.7%	12.3%	0.2%	18.1%
Average			30.0%	25.85%	17.1%	12.15%	0.35%	14.55%
Tennessee primary results (March 3, 2020)			41.7%	25.0%	15.5%	10.4%	0.4%	7.0%

Tabulation of individual polls of the 2020 Tennessee Democratic Primary
Poll source	Date(s) administered	Sample size	Margin of error	Joe Biden	Michael Bloomberg	Pete Buttigieg	Kamala Harris	Bernie Sanders	Elizabeth Warren	Other	Undecided
	Mar 1–2, 2020	Buttigieg and Klobuchar withdraw from the race									
Swayable	Mar 1–2, 2020	1,527 (LV)	± 4.0%	28%	17%	8%	–	27%	9%	11% (Note: Klobuchar with 6%; Steyer with 1%; Gabbard with no voters; "Other" with 4%)	–
Data for Progress	Feb 28–Mar 2, 2020	368 (LV)	± 5.1%	34%	20%	2%	–	27%	15%	3% (Note: Klobuchar with 2%; Gabbard with 1%)	–
	Dec 3, 2019	Harris withdraws from the race									
SurveyMonkey	Jul 2–16, 2019	128	± 11.2%	33%	–	6%	12%	13%	18%	11% (Note: Bennet with 2%; Booker, Castro, Gabbard, Gillibrand, Hickenlooper, Klobuchar, Messam, Moulton, and O'Rourke with 1%; de Blasio, Bullock, Delaney, Gravel, Inslee, Ryan, Sestak, Williamson, and Yang with 0%)	–

== Results ==
Popular vote share by county Biden—30–40% Biden—40–50% Biden—50–60% Biden—60–70% Sanders—30–40%

2020 Tennessee Democratic presidential primary
Candidate	Votes	%	Delegates
Joe Biden	215,390	41.72	36
Bernie Sanders	129,168	25.02	22
Michael Bloomberg	79,789	15.46	5
Elizabeth Warren	53,732	10.41	1
Pete Buttigieg (withdrawn)	17,102	3.31	
Amy Klobuchar (withdrawn)	10,671	2.07	
Tulsi Gabbard	2,278	0.44	
Tom Steyer (withdrawn)	1,932	0.37	
Michael Bennet (withdrawn)	1,650	0.32	
Andrew Yang (withdrawn)	1,097	0.21	
Cory Booker (withdrawn)	953	0.18	
Marianne Williamson (withdrawn)	498	0.10	
John Delaney (withdrawn)	378	0.07	
Julian Castro (withdrawn)	239	0.05	
Deval Patrick (withdrawn)	182	0.04	
Uncommitted	1,191	0.23	
Total	516,250	100%	64

=== Results by county ===
2020 Tennessee Democratic primary (results per county)
County	Joe Biden		Bernie Sanders		Michael Bloomberg		Elizabeth Warren		Pete Buttigieg		Amy Klobuchar		Tulsi Gabbard		Tom Steyer		Michael Bennet		Andrew Yang		Cory Booker		Marianne Williamson		John Delaney		Julian Castro		Deval Patrick		Uncommitted		Total votes cast
County	Votes	%	Votes	%	Votes	%	Votes	%	Votes	%	Votes	%	Votes	%	Votes	%	Votes	%	Votes	%	Votes	%	Votes	%	Votes	%	Votes	%	Votes	%	Votes	%	Total votes cast
Anderson	2,222	36.50	1,701	27.94	886	14.55	703	11.55	250	4.11	209	3.43	35	0.57	25	0.41	19	0.31	15	0.25	7	0.11	2	0.03	0	0.00	2	0.03	1	0.02	11	0.18	6,088
Bedford	799	43.33	446	24.19	284	15.40	130	7.05	60	3.25	65	3.52	15	0.81	18	0.98	8	0.43	5	0.27	5	0.27	2	0.11	3	0.16	1	0.05	2	0.11	1	0.05	1,844
Benton	402	49.26	160	19.61	129	15.81	41	5.02	39	4.78	21	2.57	3	0.37	10	1.23	4	0.49	3	0.37	0	0.00	2	0.25	1	0.12	0	0.00	0	0.00	1	0.12	816
Bledsoe	311	53.81	102	17.65	85	14.71	27	4.67	17	2.94	17	2.94	5	0.87	0	0.00	2	0.35	5	0.87	1	0.17	0	0.00	0	0.00	0	0.00	1	0.17	5	0.87	578
Blount	3,170	38.01	2,242	26.89	1,295	15.53	865	10.37	391	4.69	257	3.08	45	0.54	20	0.24	11	0.13	13	0.16	9	0.11	5	0.06	2	0.02	3	0.04	1	0.01	10	0.12	8,339
Bradley	1,762	39.21	1,239	27.57	706	15.71	360	8.01	174	3.87	155	3.45	29	0.65	19	0.42	8	0.18	12	0.27	11	0.24	1	0.02	4	0.09	2	0.04	0	0.00	12	0.27	4,494
Campbell	525	46.83	257	22.93	205	18.29	83	7.40	15	1.34	13	1.16	3	0.27	3	0.27	3	0.27	3	0.27	4	0.36	0	0.00	2	0.18	1	0.09	1	0.09	3	0.27	1,121
Cannon	281	41.69	182	27.00	105	15.58	55	8.16	18	2.67	20	2.97	5	0.74	3	0.45	2	0.30	1	0.15	0	0.00	0	0.00	0	0.00	0	0.00	1	0.15	1	0.15	674
Carroll	548	52.14	220	20.93	162	15.41	49	4.66	28	2.66	16	1.52	2	0.19	7	0.67	10	0.95	1	0.10	2	0.19	1	0.10	1	0.10	2	0.19	0	0.00	2	0.19	1,051
Carter	823	35.66	766	33.19	344	14.90	219	9.49	72	3.12	36	1.56	13	0.56	9	0.39	4	0.17	5	0.22	1	0.04	0	0.00	7	0.30	1	0.04	1	0.04	7	0.30	2,308
Cheatham	882	32.96	761	28.44	495	18.50	304	11.36	120	4.48	70	2.62	14	0.52	13	0.49	5	0.19	2	0.07	4	0.15	2	0.07	2	0.07	1	0.04	0	0.00	1	0.04	2,676
Chester	297	49.83	139	23.32	64	10.74	53	8.89	13	2.18	12	2.01	4	0.67	6	1.01	3	0.50	2	0.34	0	0.00	1	0.17	1	0.17	0	0.00	1	0.17	0	0.00	596
Claiborne	444	42.90	272	26.28	166	16.04	67	6.47	24	2.32	35	3.38	6	0.58	6	0.58	3	0.29	2	0.19	1	0.10	2	0.19	1	0.10	0	0.00	0	0.00	6	0.58	1,035
Clay	149	44.48	77	22.99	65	19.40	16	4.78	8	2.39	11	3.28	1	0.30	2	0.60	2	0.60	0	0.00	1	0.30	0	0.00	1	0.30	1	0.30	0	0.00	1	0.30	335
Cocke	446	38.55	324	28.00	209	18.06	75	6.48	43	3.72	38	3.28	2	0.17	6	0.52	2	0.17	2	0.17	4	0.35	1	0.09	3	0.26	0	0.00	1	0.09	1	0.09	1,157
Coffee	1,124	40.78	672	24.38	473	17.16	196	7.11	116	4.21	83	3.01	15	0.54	14	0.51	9	0.33	14	0.51	8	0.29	12	0.44	1	0.04	5	0.18	1	0.04	13	0.47	2,756
Crockett	348	61.27	83	14.61	74	13.03	17	2.99	12	2.11	10	1.76	5	0.88	5	0.88	5	0.88	2	0.35	3	0.53	0	0.00	1	0.18	1	0.18	1	0.18	1	0.18	568
Cumberland	1,423	43.27	614	18.67	643	19.55	258	7.84	132	4.01	134	4.07	10	0.30	23	0.70	13	0.40	8	0.24	6	0.18	5	0.15	2	0.06	2	0.06	0	0.00	16	0.49	3,289
Davidson	32,882	35.35	25,730	27.66	12,164	13.08	14,813	15.92	3,797	4.08	1,795	1.93	378	0.41	331	0.36	136	0.15	261	0.28	118	0.13	248	0.27	24	0.03	38	0.04	19	0.02	285	0.31	93,019
Decatur	231	48.94	89	18.86	91	19.28	19	4.03	9	1.91	8	1.69	7	1.48	4	0.85	2	0.42	0	0.00	4	0.85	0	0.00	2	0.42	1	0.21	0	0.00	5	1.06	472
DeKalb	447	45.89	203	20.84	165	16.94	74	7.60	24	2.46	27	2.77	6	0.62	12	1.23	4	0.41	1	0.10	3	0.31	2	0.21	2	0.21	1	0.10	0	0.00	3	0.31	974
Dickson	1,195	42.38	703	24.93	462	16.38	262	9.29	81	2.87	52	1.84	12	0.43	16	0.57	10	0.35	10	0.35	2	0.07	1	0.04	3	0.11	1	0.04	1	0.04	9	0.32	2,820
Dyer	647	51.23	231	18.29	259	20.51	65	5.15	22	1.74	18	1.43	3	0.24	3	0.24	6	0.48	1	0.08	1	0.08	0	0.00	1	0.08	0	0.00	4	0.32	2	0.16	1,263
Fayette	1,534	56.58	427	15.75	482	17.78	119	4.39	49	1.81	29	1.07	13	0.48	6	0.22	17	0.63	2	0.07	12	0.44	2	0.07	10	0.37	4	0.15	3	0.11	2	0.07	2,711
Fentress	226	40.29	130	23.17	105	18.72	50	8.91	16	2.85	17	3.03	3	0.53	5	0.89	2	0.36	1	0.18	2	0.36	0	0.00	1	0.18	0	0.00	0	0.00	3	0.53	561
Franklin	1,225	44.38	587	21.27	435	15.76	326	11.81	70	2.54	63	2.28	7	0.25	14	0.51	6	0.22	2	0.07	8	0.29	2	0.07	0	0.00	4	0.14	2	0.07	9	0.33	2,760
Gibson	1,272	59.44	356	16.64	292	13.64	82	3.83	48	2.24	26	1.21	11	0.51	13	0.61	18	0.84	4	0.19	8	0.37	1	0.05	3	0.14	1	0.05	1	0.05	4	0.19	2,140
Giles	729	50.87	287	20.03	250	17.45	77	5.37	43	3.00	23	1.61	4	0.28	6	0.42	4	0.28	0	0.00	5	0.35	0	0.00	3	0.21	0	0.00	0	0.00	2	0.14	1,433
Grainger	268	41.68	157	24.42	117	18.20	48	7.47	19	2.95	13	2.02	3	0.47	6	0.93	3	0.47	0	0.00	0	0.00	1	0.16	1	0.16	0	0.00	0	0.00	7	1.09	643
Greene	1,118	41.48	700	25.97	372	13.80	241	8.94	102	3.78	70	2.60	23	0.85	26	0.96	7	0.26	11	0.41	3	0.11	12	0.45	1	0.04	2	0.07	2	0.07	5	0.19	2,695
Grundy	265	41.80	116	18.30	126	19.87	55	8.68	19	3.00	8	1.26	2	0.32	8	1.26	5	0.79	2	0.32	1	0.16	1	0.16	3	0.47	2	0.32	1	0.16	20	3.15	634
Hamblen	994	42.41	676	28.84	345	14.72	144	6.14	72	3.07	60	2.56	11	0.47	6	0.26	10	0.43	4	0.17	8	0.34	2	0.09	7	0.30	1	0.04	0	0.00	4	0.17	2,344
Hamilton	16,296	43.88	9,428	25.39	5,556	14.96	3,640	9.80	1,076	2.90	624	1.68	144	0.39	110	0.30	62	0.17	78	0.21	38	0.10	16	0.04	7	0.02	7	0.02	7	0.02	48	0.13	37,137
Hancock	68	46.58	38	26.03	27	18.49	3	2.05	5	3.42	3	2.05	1	0.68	0	0.00	1	0.68	0	0.00	0	0.00	0	0.00	0	0.00	0	0.00	0	0.00	0	0.00	146
Hardeman	1,103	61.97	202	11.35	342	19.21	44	2.47	13	0.73	10	0.56	4	0.22	9	0.51	26	1.46	4	0.22	3	0.17	6	0.34	4	0.22	0	0.00	1	0.06	9	0.51	1,780
Hardin	520	58.30	153	17.15	107	12.00	45	5.04	19	2.13	22	2.47	5	0.56	9	1.01	1	0.11	4	0.45	2	0.22	1	0.11	0	0.00	0	0.00	0	0.00	4	0.45	892
Hawkins	865	46.51	481	25.86	281	15.11	104	5.59	45	2.42	32	1.72	8	0.43	12	0.65	4	0.22	7	0.38	3	0.16	2	0.11	3	0.16	2	0.11	1	0.05	10	0.54	1,860
Haywood	848	58.24	152	10.44	363	24.93	42	2.88	11	0.76	15	1.03	1	0.07	5	0.34	11	0.76	1	0.07	3	0.21	1	0.07	1	0.07	1	0.07	1	0.07	0	0.00	1,456
Henderson	395	56.11	157	22.30	79	11.22	27	3.84	14	1.99	17	2.41	4	0.57	1	0.14	5	0.71	1	0.14	0	0.00	0	0.00	0	0.00	1	0.14	0	0.00	3	0.43	704
Henry	768	44.50	329	19.06	361	20.92	111	6.43	65	3.77	44	2.55	8	0.46	10	0.58	9	0.52	3	0.17	9	0.52	1	0.06	1	0.06	3	0.17	1	0.06	3	0.17	1,726
Hickman	417	40.96	257	25.25	170	16.70	84	8.25	40	3.93	27	2.65	3	0.29	5	0.49	3	0.29	4	0.39	1	0.10	2	0.20	1	0.10	0	0.00	0	0.00	4	0.39	1,018
Houston	197	48.88	82	20.35	60	14.89	28	6.95	18	4.47	4	0.99	2	0.50	1	0.25	1	0.25	0	0.00	2	0.50	2	0.50	1	0.25	0	0.00	0	0.00	5	1.24	403
Humphreys	455	42.72	239	22.44	220	20.66	56	5.26	33	3.10	30	2.82	6	0.56	9	0.85	4	0.38	2	0.19	4	0.38	0	0.00	0	0.00	0	0.00	1	0.09	6	0.56	1,065
Jackson	234	43.98	139	26.13	76	14.29	34	6.39	22	4.14	11	2.07	4	0.75	5	0.94	1	0.19	2	0.38	1	0.19	0	0.00	1	0.19	0	0.00	0	0.00	2	0.38	532
Jefferson	862	41.38	546	26.21	352	16.90	186	8.93	59	2.83	43	2.06	7	0.34	7	0.34	2	0.10	6	0.29	4	0.19	2	0.10	2	0.10	0	0.00	0	0.00	5	0.24	2,083
Johnson	226	37.17	177	29.11	89	14.64	46	7.57	35	5.76	22	3.62	3	0.49	4	0.66	2	0.33	1	0.16	0	0.00	0	0.00	2	0.33	0	0.00	1	0.16	0	0.00	608
Knox	14,885	32.07	14,722	31.72	6,512	14.03	6,245	13.45	2,044	4.40	1,256	2.71	223	0.48	123	0.27	95	0.20	107	0.23	54	0.12	20	0.04	25	0.05	10	0.02	9	0.02	84	0.18	46,414
Lake	133	54.29	51	20.82	39	15.92	8	3.27	2	0.82	2	0.82	0	0.00	0	0.00	7	2.86	1	0.41	1	0.41	0	0.00	0	0.00	1	0.41	0	0.00	0	0.00	245
Lauderdale	727	55.88	223	17.14	245	18.83	36	2.77	15	1.15	13	1.00	5	0.38	8	0.61	10	0.77	6	0.46	3	0.23	0	0.00	3	0.23	0	0.00	2	0.15	5	0.38	1,301
Lawrence	803	48.67	379	22.97	272	16.48	89	5.39	25	1.52	39	2.36	11	0.67	10	0.61	8	0.48	1	0.06	2	0.12	1	0.06	2	0.12	1	0.06	1	0.06	6	0.36	1,650
Lewis	169	32.13	192	36.50	83	15.78	43	8.17	17	3.23	10	1.90	6	1.14	0	0.00	3	0.57	0	0.00	0	0.00	0	0.00	2	0.38	0	0.00	0	0.00	1	0.19	526
Lincoln	648	46.85	287	20.75	227	16.41	112	8.10	32	2.31	28	2.02	8	0.58	11	0.80	6	0.43	2	0.14	4	0.29	9	0.65	0	0.00	3	0.22	0	0.00	6	0.43	1,383
Loudon	1,295	38.78	640	19.17	746	22.34	244	7.31	179	5.36	178	5.33	11	0.33	14	0.42	9	0.27	5	0.15	4	0.12	3	0.09	3	0.09	3	0.09	0	0.00	5	0.15	3,339
Macon	209	36.73	161	28.30	128	22.50	26	4.57	24	4.22	9	1.58	2	0.35	2	0.35	4	0.70	1	0.18	0	0.00	0	0.00	1	0.18	1	0.18	0	0.00	1	0.18	569
Madison	4,063	58.06	1,121	16.02	1,003	14.33	416	5.94	128	1.83	115	1.64	16	0.23	39	0.56	30	0.43	10	0.14	19	0.27	7	0.10	9	0.13	1	0.01	4	0.06	17	0.24	6,998
Marion	1,027	42.49	420	17.38	441	18.25	158	6.54	76	3.14	62	2.57	67	2.77	23	0.95	24	0.99	13	0.54	13	0.54	3	0.12	19	0.79	4	0.17	2	0.08	65	2.69	2,417
Marshall	683	43.53	385	24.54	256	16.32	126	8.03	47	3.00	35	2.23	7	0.45	9	0.57	2	0.13	4	0.25	5	0.32	3	0.19	2	0.13	0	0.00	2	0.13	3	0.19	1,569
Maury	2,517	43.61	1,478	25.61	844	14.62	485	8.40	216	3.74	134	2.32	25	0.43	16	0.28	10	0.17	12	0.21	8	0.14	2	0.03	1	0.02	2	0.03	4	0.07	18	0.31	5,772
McMinn	953	44.49	453	21.15	361	16.85	160	7.47	73	3.41	55	2.57	15	0.70	28	1.31	11	0.51	6	0.28	4	0.19	1	0.05	1	0.05	3	0.14	5	0.23	13	0.61	2,142
McNairy	573	60.00	153	16.02	139	14.55	34	3.56	16	1.68	10	1.05	4	0.42	3	0.31	6	0.63	5	0.52	4	0.42	3	0.31	2	0.21	0	0.00	0	0.00	3	0.31	955
Meigs	258	47.78	101	18.70	101	18.70	25	4.63	13	2.41	21	3.89	5	0.93	4	0.74	2	0.37	0	0.00	4	0.74	0	0.00	2	0.37	0	0.00	0	0.00	4	0.74	540
Monroe	867	45.63	403	21.21	386	20.32	104	5.47	59	3.11	50	2.63	6	0.32	7	0.37	1	0.05	3	0.16	1	0.05	1	0.05	1	0.05	1	0.05	1	0.05	9	0.47	1,900
Montgomery	5,351	43.12	3,406	27.45	1,711	13.79	1,024	8.25	373	3.01	236	1.90	67	0.54	57	0.46	52	0.42	44	0.35	29	0.23	5	0.04	17	0.14	16	0.13	8	0.06	14	0.11	12,410
Moore	138	46.00	51	17.00	60	20.00	24	8.00	12	4.00	5	1.67	2	0.67	2	0.67	1	0.33	0	0.00	0	0.00	2	0.67	1	0.33	0	0.00	0	0.00	2	0.67	300
Morgan	236	36.82	165	25.74	124	19.34	56	8.74	22	3.43	11	1.72	6	0.94	7	1.09	7	1.09	1	0.16	0	0.00	0	0.00	1	0.16	0	0.00	1	0.16	4	0.62	641
Obion	580	53.95	202	18.79	145	13.49	54	5.02	36	3.35	24	2.23	6	0.56	7	0.65	5	0.47	4	0.37	4	0.37	0	0.00	2	0.19	2	0.19	1	0.09	3	0.28	1,075
Overton	512	42.14	281	23.13	248	20.41	61	5.02	31	2.55	26	2.14	8	0.66	10	0.82	10	0.82	4	0.33	9	0.74	4	0.33	1	0.08	2	0.16	1	0.08	7	0.58	1,215
Perry	135	43.83	75	24.35	55	17.86	16	5.19	12	3.90	6	1.95	4	1.30	3	0.97	0	0.00	0	0.00	1	0.32	0	0.00	1	0.32	0	0.00	0	0.00	0	0.00	308
Pickett	132	47.14	48	17.14	66	23.57	12	4.29	8	2.86	12	4.29	0	0.00	2	0.71	0	0.00	0	0.00	0	0.00	0	0.00	0	0.00	0	0.00	0	0.00	0	0.00	280
Polk	467	44.39	222	21.10	176	16.73	47	4.47	27	2.57	43	4.09	11	1.05	8	0.76	5	0.48	2	0.19	1	0.10	2	0.19	1	0.10	0	0.00	2	0.19	38	3.61	1,052
Putnam	1,361	30.87	1,509	34.23	632	14.33	422	9.57	224	5.08	156	3.54	27	0.61	29	0.66	9	0.20	12	0.27	11	0.25	0	0.00	1	0.02	2	0.05	3	0.07	11	0.25	4,409
Rhea	541	46.52	266	22.87	210	18.06	72	6.19	26	2.24	15	1.29	10	0.86	7	0.60	4	0.34	2	0.17	1	0.09	1	0.09	0	0.00	1	0.09	0	0.00	7	0.60	1,163
Roane	1,297	40.93	743	23.45	559	17.64	244	7.70	145	4.58	117	3.69	23	0.73	11	0.35	6	0.19	5	0.16	2	0.06	2	0.06	5	0.16	1	0.03	2	0.06	7	0.22	3,169
Robertson	1,621	43.31	859	22.95	652	17.42	298	7.96	116	3.10	98	2.62	26	0.69	25	0.67	12	0.32	8	0.21	6	0.16	1	0.03	5	0.13	3	0.08	1	0.03	12	0.32	3,743
Rutherford	9,112	37.95	7,803	32.50	2,832	11.79	2,516	10.48	878	3.66	445	1.85	120	0.50	75	0.31	49	0.20	75	0.31	48	0.20	10	0.04	10	0.04	15	0.06	3	0.01	21	0.09	24,012
Scott	192	46.60	108	26.21	61	14.81	25	6.07	7	1.70	7	1.70	4	0.97	3	0.73	1	0.24	0	0.00	1	0.24	1	0.24	0	0.00	0	0.00	0	0.00	2	0.49	412
Sequatchie	270	40.30	161	24.03	131	19.55	50	7.46	26	3.88	24	3.58	4	0.60	1	0.15	1	0.15	1	0.15	0	0.00	0	0.00	0	0.00	0	0.00	1	0.15	0	0.00	670
Sevier	1,536	39.51	1,149	29.55	588	15.12	309	7.95	153	3.94	83	2.13	23	0.59	12	0.31	4	0.10	7	0.18	2	0.05	5	0.13	3	0.08	2	0.05	3	0.08	9	0.23	3,888
Shelby	50,280	49.20	20,492	20.05	18,185	17.79	8,465	8.28	1,748	1.71	1,123	1.10	229	0.22	280	0.27	623	0.61	127	0.12	311	0.30	28	0.03	100	0.10	50	0.05	54	0.05	108	0.11	102,203
Smith	391	35.38	239	21.63	291	26.33	73	6.61	34	3.08	28	2.53	3	0.27	7	0.63	10	0.90	6	0.54	5	0.45	1	0.09	2	0.18	1	0.09	0	0.00	14	1.27	1,105
Stewart	279	41.64	148	22.09	133	19.85	43	6.42	21	3.13	24	3.58	3	0.45	3	0.45	5	0.75	4	0.60	3	0.45	0	0.00	0	0.00	1	0.15	0	0.00	3	0.45	670
Sullivan	3,147	41.09	2,252	29.41	1,017	13.28	660	8.62	268	3.50	191	2.49	43	0.56	29	0.38	17	0.22	12	0.16	2	0.03	6	0.08	3	0.04	1	0.01	2	0.03	8	0.10	7,658
Sumner	4,997	42.96	2,879	24.75	1,708	14.68	1,201	10.33	402	3.46	234	2.01	72	0.62	44	0.38	27	0.23	16	0.14	19	0.16	8	0.07	4	0.03	7	0.06	4	0.03	9	0.08	11,631
Tipton	1,144	47.35	517	21.40	460	19.04	174	7.20	44	1.82	30	1.24	13	0.54	9	0.37	8	0.33	3	0.12	3	0.12	0	0.00	6	0.25	1	0.04	1	0.04	3	0.12	2,416
Trousdale	182	43.13	81	19.19	111	26.30	21	4.98	13	3.08	9	2.13	1	0.24	2	0.47	1	0.24	0	0.00	1	0.24	0	0.00	0	0.00	0	0.00	0	0.00	0	0.00	422
Unicoi	265	34.06	283	36.38	117	15.04	56	7.20	22	2.83	23	2.96	5	0.64	2	0.26	1	0.13	1	0.13	1	0.13	0	0.00	0	0.00	0	0.00	0	0.00	2	0.26	778
Union	289	47.53	159	26.15	103	16.94	25	4.11	8	1.32	4	0.66	6	0.99	7	1.15	1	0.16	3	0.49	0	0.00	0	0.00	0	0.00	0	0.00	0	0.00	3	0.49	608
Van Buren	132	42.17	58	18.53	69	22.04	24	7.67	9	2.88	8	2.56	1	0.32	2	0.64	3	0.96	0	0.00	3	0.96	0	0.00	1	0.32	0	0.00	0	0.00	3	0.96	313
Warren	817	38.59	506	23.90	412	19.46	157	7.42	71	3.35	59	2.79	22	1.04	19	0.90	16	0.76	5	0.24	11	0.52	1	0.05	5	0.24	3	0.14	1	0.05	12	0.57	2,117
Washington	2,828	32.87	3,096	35.98	1,039	12.08	934	10.86	370	4.30	221	2.57	36	0.42	31	0.36	13	0.15	12	0.14	7	0.08	2	0.02	4	0.05	2	0.02	0	0.00	9	0.10	8,604
Wayne	155	46.97	58	17.58	62	18.79	22	6.67	17	5.15	4	1.21	0	0.00	3	0.91	1	0.30	0	0.00	2	0.61	2	0.61	0	0.00	1	0.30	0	0.00	3	0.91	330
Weakley	624	44.13	323	22.84	192	13.58	138	9.76	42	2.97	45	3.18	10	0.71	6	0.42	10	0.71	2	0.14	2	0.14	2	0.14	1	0.07	0	0.00	1	0.07	16	1.13	1,414
White	481	42.05	274	23.95	205	17.92	67	5.86	41	3.58	24	2.10	11	0.96	10	0.87	1	0.09	4	0.35	1	0.09	1	0.09	2	0.17	0	0.00	1	0.09	21	1.84	1,144
Williamson	10,441	43.48	4,671	19.45	3,932	16.37	2,881	12.00	1,086	4.52	709	2.95	133	0.55	50	0.21	28	0.12	33	0.14	19	0.08	9	0.04	6	0.02	4	0.02	3	0.01	11	0.05	24,016
Wilson	3,404	38.90	1,886	21.55	1,582	18.08	907	10.37	486	5.55	295	3.37	43	0.49	40	0.46	16	0.18	21	0.24	10	0.11	11	0.13	7	0.08	3	0.03	1	0.01	38	0.43	8,750
Total	215,390	41.72	129,168	25.02	79,789	15.46	53,732	10.41	17,102	3.31	10,671	2.07	2,278	0.44	1,932	0.37	1,650	0.32	1,097	0.21	953	0.18	498	0.10	378	0.07	239	0.05	182	0.04	1,191	0.23	516,250

== See also ==
- 2020 Tennessee Republican presidential primary
- 2020 United States presidential election
- 2020 United States presidential election in Tennessee
- 2020 Tennessee elections
