= COVID-19 pandemic in Georgia =

COVID-19 pandemic in Georgia may refer to:

- COVID-19 pandemic in Georgia (country)
- COVID-19 pandemic in Georgia (U.S. state)
