= 2020 Georgia Democratic presidential primary =

- June 9, 2020

118 delegates (105 pledged, 13 unpledged) to the Democratic National Convention The number of pledged delegates won is determined by the popular vote

Candidate	Joe Biden	Bernie Sanders (withdrawn)
Home state	Delaware	Vermont
Delegate count	105	0
Popular vote	922,177	101,668
Percentage	84.86%	9.36%
- Election results by county Joe Biden

Pledged national convention delegates
Type	Del.	Type	Del.
CD1	5	CD8	4
CD2	5	CD9	4
CD3	4	CD10	4
CD4	7	CD11	5
CD5	7	CD12	4
CD6	5	CD13	6
CD7	5	CD14	3
PLEO	14	At-large	23
Total pledged delegates			105

The 2020 Georgia Democratic presidential primary was held on June 9, 2020, alongside the West Virginia primary, as part of the Democratic Party primaries for the 2020 presidential election. It was originally scheduled for March 24, 2020, but was moved to June 9 due to the COVID-19 pandemic, and previously cast early mail-in votes were disallowed and separately counted. The election coincided with primaries for Georgia's Class 2 Senate seat and Georgia's U.S. House of Representatives seats. The Georgia primary was an open primary, which awarded 118 delegates to the 2020 Democratic National Convention, of whom 105 were pledged delegates allocated on the basis of the primary results.

Former vice president and recently determined presumptive nominee Joe Biden won the primary and all 105 delegates with roughly 85% of the vote, while senator Bernie Sanders only received little more than 9%. Ten other withdrawn candidates, notably senator Elizabeth Warren in third place, made up the remaining 6%. When totalling from the participation in the March 24 and June 9 primaries, this primary theoretically resulted in the highest Democratic presidential primary turnout ever.

== Procedure ==
Georgia was previously scheduled to be the only state voting on March 24, 2020, in the Democratic primaries, after secretary of state Brad Raffensperger had announced the date of the primary on June 19, 2019. The move marked a departure from past years, shifting away from an earlier March contest on Super Tuesday (traditionally made up of many southern states and therefore dubbed the "SEC primary"). Although its later date had the potential to diminish its influence, the Georgia primary's separation from other states on the primary calendar might also have placed it in a more influential position should the primary still have been competitive by then. Due to the COVID-19 pandemic, however, the primary was first on March 14 moved by Raffensperger to the general Georgia primary date for other offices on May 19, and then both primaries were on April 9 again rescheduled to June 9, with Georgia voting alongside equally rescheduled West Virginia on that day. More than 200,000 votes had already been cast by mail in the March 24 primary before it was cancelled. These votes were not included in the official June 9 primary result, however they were separately counted. Voters who participated in the March 24 primary were able to vote again in the June 9 primary, but only for other offices.

Voting was expected to take place throughout the state from 7:00 a.m. until 7:00 p.m. In the open primary, candidates had to meet a threshold of 15 percent at the congressional district or statewide level in order to be considered viable. The 105 pledged delegates to the 2020 Democratic National Convention were allocated proportionally on the basis of the results of the primary. Of these, between 3 and 7 were allocated to each of the state's 14 congressional districts and another 14 were allocated to party leaders and elected officials (PLEO delegates), in addition to 23 at-large delegates. Due to the original March date the primary as part of Stage I on the primary timetable received no bonus delegates, in order to disperse the primaries between more different date clusters and keep too many states from hoarding on a March date.

District-level delegates were elected on May 23 (caucuses to be held online, previously scheduled for March 28 or March 29) and then selected the 14 pledged PLEO delegates also online on June 20 (previously scheduled for April 18). The state committee meeting was subsequently held also on June 20 and voted on the 23 at-large delegates for the Democratic National Convention. The delegation also included 13 unpledged PLEO delegates: 8 members of the Democratic National Committee, 4 representatives from Congress, and former president Jimmy Carter.

== Candidates ==
The following candidates qualified for the ballot in Georgia:

Running

- Joe Biden

Withdrawn

- Michael Bennet
- Michael Bloomberg
- Pete Buttigieg
- John Delaney
- Tulsi Gabbard
- Amy Klobuchar
- Deval Patrick
- Bernie Sanders
- Tom Steyer
- Elizabeth Warren
- Andrew Yang

== Polling ==
Polling aggregation
Source of poll aggregation	Date updated	Dates Polled	Joe Biden	Bernie Sanders	Undecided (Note: Calculated by taking the difference of 100% and all other candidates combined)
FiveThirtyEight	Mar 14, 2020	until Feb 13, 2020 (Note: FiveThirtyEight aggregates polls with a trendline regression of polls rather than a strict average of recent polls.)	67.3%	30.1%	2.6%

Poll source	Date(s) administered	Sample size	Margin of error	Joe Biden	Michael Bloomberg	Pete Buttigieg	Kamala Harris	Bernie Sanders	Elizabeth Warren	Andrew Yang	Other	Undecided
	Apr 8, 2020	Sanders suspends his campaign										
The Progress Campaign (D)	Mar 12–21, 2020	913 (RV)	± 4.6%	63%	–	–	–	34%	–	–	–	2.3% (Note: Listed as "other/undecided")
University of Georgia	Mar 4–14, 2020	807	± 3.4%	66%	–	–	–	22%	–	–	1% (Note: Gabbard with 1%)	11%
	Mar 5, 2020	Warren withdraws from the race										
	Mar 4, 2020	Bloomberg withdraws from the race										
	Mar 1, 2020	Buttigieg withdraws from the race										
Landmark Communications	Feb 12, 2020	500	± 4.3%	32%	14%	5%	–	14%	4%	–	6% (Note: Klobuchar with 3%; Steyer with 2%; Gabbard with 1%)	26%
	Feb 11, 2020	Yang withdraws from the race										
	Dec 3, 2019	Harris withdraws from the race										
SurveyUSA	Nov 15–18, 2019	536	± 5.2%	36%	6%	7%	6%	17%	14%	–	5%	9%
Climate Nexus	Nov 4–10, 2019	457	± 3.6%	31%	–	4%	4%	14%	14%	2%	11% (Note: Booker and Williamson with 2%; Bennet, Bullock, Castro, Delaney, Gabbard, Klobuchar, and Steyer with 1%; Sestak with 0%)	19%
Landmark Communications	Sep 18–21, 2019	500	± 4.1%	41%	–	5%	6%	8%	17%	2%	6% (Note: Booker with 2%; Gabbard, Klobuchar, O'Rourke, and Williamson with 1%; Bennet, Castro, and Steyer with 0%)	15%
Change Research	Sep 7–11, 2019	755	± 3.6%	33%	–	7%	7%	17%	22%	3%	10% (Note: O'Rourke with 3%; Booker, Gabbard, and Williamson with 2%; Castro and Klobuchar with 1%; Bennet, Bullock, Delaney, Messam, and Steyer with 0%)	–
SurveyMonkey	Jul 2–16, 2019	402	± 6.4%	31%	–	5%	15%	12%	13%	4%	11% (Note: Castro with 3%; Booker, Bullock, and Klobuchar with 2%; O'Rourke and Ryan with 1%; Bennet, de Blasio, Delaney, Gabbard, Gillibrand, Gravel, Hickenlooper, Messam, Moulton, Sestak, and Williamson with 0%)	9%

== Results ==
2020 Georgia Democratic presidential primary
Candidate	Votes	%	Delegates
Joe Biden	922,177	84.86	105
Bernie Sanders (withdrawn)	101,668	9.36	
Elizabeth Warren (withdrawn)	21,906	2.02	
Andrew Yang (withdrawn)	9,117	0.84	
Michael Bloomberg (withdrawn)	7,657	0.70	
Pete Buttigieg (withdrawn)	6,346	0.58	
Michael Bennet (withdrawn)	5,154	0.47	
Amy Klobuchar (withdrawn)	4,317	0.40	
Tulsi Gabbard (withdrawn)	4,117	0.38	
Tom Steyer (withdrawn)	1,752	0.16	
John Delaney (withdrawn)	1,476	0.14	
Deval Patrick (withdrawn)	1,042	0.10	
Total	1,086,729	100%	105

== See also ==
- 2020 Georgia Republican presidential primary
