= 2020 West Virginia Democratic presidential primary =

- June 9, 2020

34 delegates (28 pledged, 6 unpledged) to the Democratic National Convention The number of pledged delegates won is determined by the popular vote

Candidate	Joe Biden	Bernie Sanders (withdrawn)	David Lee Rice
Home state	Delaware	Vermont	West Virginia
Delegate count	28	0	0
Popular vote	122,518	22,793	15,470
Percentage	65.35%	12.16%	8.25%
County results
Biden
40–50%
50–60%
60–70%
70–80%

Pledged national convention delegates
Type	Del.
CD1	6
CD2	7
CD3	6
PLEO	3
At-large	6
Total pledged delegates	28

The 2020 West Virginia Democratic presidential primary was held on June 9, 2020 alongside the Georgia primary, as part of the Democratic Party primaries for the 2020 presidential election. It was originally scheduled for May 12, 2020, but was moved to June 9 due to the COVID-19 pandemic. The West Virginia primary was a semi-closed primary, with the state awarding 34 delegates to the 2020 Democratic National Convention, of whom 28 were pledged delegates allocated on the basis of the primary results.

Former vice president and recently determined presumptive nominee Joe Biden swept the state and won all 28 delegates with 65% of the vote, winning all 55 counties. Senator Bernie Sanders missed the delegate threshold with little more than 12%, a stark reversal from 2016 when he had won all 55 counties, and David Lee Rice, an army veteran and resident of Parkersburg, West Virginia, who did not appear on the ballot in any other state, received 8%.

== Procedure ==
West Virginia was previously scheduled to vote on May 12, 2020, alongside Nebraska, in the Democratic primaries, but on April 1 the primary was rescheduled by governor Jim Justice to June 9, 2020, setting it alongside the equally rescheduled Georgia primary. Voting took place throughout the state from 6:30 a.m. until 7:30 p.m.

In the semi-closed primary, candidates had to meet a threshold of 15 percent at the congressional district or statewide level in order to be considered viable. The 28 pledged delegates to the 2020 Democratic National Convention were allocated proportionally on the basis of the results of the primary. Of these, between 6 and 7 were allocated to each of the state's 3 congressional districts and another 3 were allocated to party leaders and elected officials (PLEO delegates), in addition to 6 at-large delegates. Originally planned with 24 delegates, the final number included a 20% bonus of 4 additional delegates on the original number of 16 district and 5 at-large delegates by the Democratic National Committee due to the original May date, which belonged to Stage III on the primary timetable.

Following the election of district delegates to the district caucuses and the state convention on June 2, national convention district-level delegates were elected by the district caucuses during the state convention on June 12, 2020, and the 6 at-large and 3 pledged PLEO delegates were elected by the state executive committee the following day, also at the state convention. The delegation also included 6 unpledged PLEO delegates: 5 members of the Democratic National Committee and one senator from Congress.

== Candidates ==
The following candidates qualified for the ballot in West Virginia:

Running

- Joe Biden
- David Lee Rice

Withdrawn

- Michael Bennet
- Michael Bloomberg
- Pete Buttigieg
- Tulsi Gabbard
- Amy Klobuchar
- Deval Patrick
- Bernie Sanders
- Tom Steyer
- Elizabeth Warren
- Andrew Yang

== Results ==
2020 West Virginia Democratic presidential primary
Candidate	Votes	%	Delegates
Joe Biden	122,518	65.35	28
Bernie Sanders (withdrawn)	22,793	12.16	
David Lee Rice	15,470	8.25	
Elizabeth Warren (withdrawn)	5,741	3.06	
Tulsi Gabbard (withdrawn)	4,163	2.22	
Michael Bloomberg (withdrawn)	3,759	2.01	
Pete Buttigieg (withdrawn)	3,455	1.84	
Amy Klobuchar (withdrawn)	3,011	1.61	
Andrew Yang (withdrawn)	2,590	1.38	
Michael Bennet (withdrawn)	1,865	0.99	
Tom Steyer (withdrawn)	1,235	0.66	
Deval Patrick (withdrawn)	882	0.47	
Total	187,482	100%	28

=== County results ===
County	Joe Biden		Bernie Sanders		David Lee Rice		Others		Total votes
County	%	#	%	#	%	#	%	#	Total votes
Barbour	68.83%	923	7.98%	107	10.22%	137	12.97%	174	1,341
Berkeley	73.74%	5,952	12.31%	994	2.92%	236	11.03%	890	8,072
Boone	54.40%	1,689	10.27%	319	17.39%	540	17.94%	557	3,105
Braxton	62.80%	1,133	8.09%	146	11.97%	216	17.14%	309	1,804
Brooke	62.70%	1,861	10.88%	323	8.79%	261	17.63%	523	2,968
Cabell	68.32%	6,792	15.17%	1,508	4.34%	431	12.17%	1,211	9,942
Calhoun	47.29%	392	16.04%	133	21.59%	179	15.08%	125	829
Clay	52.01%	439	10.31%	87	19.31%	163	18.37%	155	844
Doddridge	59.44%	192	14.55%	47	13.31%	43	12.70%	41	323
Fayette	63.52%	3,167	12.01%	599	9.07%	452	15.40%	768	4,986
Gilmer	55.24%	448	11.47%	93	15.04%	122	18.25%	148	811
Grant	69.64%	211	13.53%	41	4.62%	14	12.21%	37	303
Greenbrier	66.10%	2,660	12.03%	484	7.70%	310	14.17%	570	4,024
Hampshire	64.56%	942	9.87%	144	9.73%	142	15.84%	231	1,459
Hancock	65.23%	2,217	9.44%	321	8.68%	295	16.65%	566	3,399
Hardy	62.55%	810	10.42%	135	11.89%	154	15.14%	196	1,295
Harrison	66.02%	5,266	10.04%	801	8.38%	668	15.56%	1,241	7,976
Jackson	71.03%	1,986	8.66%	242	8.83%	247	11.48%	321	2,796
Jefferson	74.69%	4,807	14.05%	904	1.55%	100	9.71%	625	6,436
Kanawha	73.10%	18,069	11.75%	2,905	3.64%	901	11.51%	2,844	24,719
Lewis	58.51%	976	10.97%	183	11.69%	195	18.83%	314	1,668
Lincoln	57.38%	1,182	10.10%	208	18.20%	375	14.32%	295	2,060
Logan	50.90%	1,504	11.95%	353	19.90%	588	17.25%	510	2,955
Marion	61.93%	4,818	13.47%	1,048	7.38%	574	17.22%	1,340	7,780
Marshall	59.87%	2,107	10.88%	383	11.88%	418	17.37%	611	3,519
Mason	62.10%	1,670	9.26%	249	13.13%	353	15.51%	417	2,689
McDowell	57.85%	980	8.26%	140	13.58%	230	20.31%	344	1,694
Mercer	62.94%	2,683	13.61%	580	8.42%	359	15.03%	641	4,263
Mineral	68.51%	1,162	11.32%	192	9.08%	154	11.09%	188	1,696
Mingo	41.10%	921	14.15%	317	20.44%	458	24.31%	545	2,241
Monongalia	63.65%	7,967	17.74%	2,221	3.94%	493	14.67%	1,836	12,517
Monroe	66.53%	811	10.83%	132	8.53%	104	14.11%	172	1,219
Morgan	72.64%	770	14.15%	150	2.83%	30	10.38%	110	1,060
Nicholas	60.90%	1,483	9.61%	234	10.18%	248	19.31%	470	2,435
Ohio	68.14%	3,700	13.02%	707	4.90%	266	13.94%	757	5,430
Pendleton	65.30%	557	7.97%	68	10.32%	88	16.41%	140	853
Pleasants	64.11%	493	8.32%	64	10.92%	84	16.65%	128	769
Pocahontas	63.62%	640	12.33%	124	8.05%	81	16.00%	161	1,006
Preston	64.01%	1,606	12.55%	315	10.56%	265	12.88%	323	2,509
Putnam	69.66%	3,882	12.17%	678	6.01%	335	12.16%	678	5,573
Raleigh	63.50%	4,520	11.89%	846	9.40%	669	15.21%	1,083	7,118
Randolph	59.44%	2,200	10.00%	370	15.10%	559	15.46%	572	3,701
Ritchie	61.85%	274	11.06%	49	13.32%	59	13.77%	61	443
Roane	64.33%	880	12.72%	174	9.80%	134	13.15%	180	1,368
Summers	61.84%	1,050	10.13%	172	15.43%	262	12.60%	214	1,698
Taylor	64.85%	1,057	11.35%	185	8.90%	145	14.90%	243	1,630
Tucker	58.09%	578	15.48%	154	10.15%	101	16.28%	162	995
Tyler	58.78%	318	11.65%	63	12.57%	68	17.00%	92	541
Upshur	71.84%	1,194	10.83%	180	5.29%	88	12.04%	200	1,662
Wayne	62.70%	2,533	9.75%	394	14.31%	578	13.24%	535	4,040
Webster	50.46%	491	10.89%	106	17.06%	166	21.59%	210	973
Wetzel	55.10%	1,112	11.05%	223	15.96%	322	17.89%	361	2,018
Wirt	57.55%	286	9.86%	49	15.29%	76	17.30%	86	497
Wood	68.58%	4,550	12.36%	820	7.63%	506	11.43%	759	6,635
Wyoming	47.65%	871	11.27%	206	22.43%	410	18.65%	341	1,828

== Analysis ==
Four years earlier, Sanders won the West Virginia primary by a wide margin, 51 to 35, against Hillary Clinton. This was considered to be mainly based on a protest vote against Clinton and both her and the Obama administration's coal policies. Many of the traditionally more conservative West Virginia Democrats went on to vote for Donald Trump.

In 2020, the strength Sanders had among traditionally more conservative Democrats, protest vote or not, almost collapsed, with most of the support swinging to Joe Biden. Biden was the presumptive nominee at the time as Sanders had suspended his campaign shortly before, however, Sanders did notably better than in the Kentucky primary a few weeks later, which was another state were more conservative Democrats turned out for him in 2016. This is the first primary in which the Democratic primary had fewer votes than the GOP primary.

In an indication of the alienation of the West Virginia Democratic Party from the national one, this primary marked the third consecutive time where a candidate only running in the West Virginia Democratic primary received a notable performance, with nationally obscure candidate David Lee Rice receiving 8.3% of the vote (a pattern which began in 2000, when local perennial candidate Angus McDonald won about 8%; since then, similarly unexpected results occurred in 2008 (then-withdrawn candidate John Edwards unexpectedly won about 7.5% of the vote), 2012 (Keith Judd, an imprisoned felon from California, won over 40%), and 2016 (Paul Farrell, a Huntington attorney, won about 9% and came close to winning a delegate from the state's southern congressional district).
