= 2020 Georgia Republican presidential primary =

- June 9, 2020

76 Republican National Convention delegates
Candidate	Donald Trump
Home state	Florida
Delegate count	76
Popular vote	947,352
Percentage	100%

The 2020 Georgia Republican presidential primary took place on June 9, 2020, as one of 2 contests scheduled for that day in the Republican Party primaries for the 2020 presidential election.

== Results ==
2020 Georgia Republican primary
Candidate	Votes	%	Delegates
Donald Trump	947,352	100.00	76
Total	947,352	100%	76

=== Results by county ===
2020 Georgia Republican primary (results per county)
County	Donald Trump		Write-ins		Total votes cast
County	Votes	%	Votes	%	Total votes cast
Appling	3,238	100%			3,238
Atkinson	1,361	100%			1,361
Bacon	2,310	100%			2,310
Baker	65	100%			65
Baldwin	3,587	100%			3,587
Banks	3,622	100%			3,622
Barrow	8,476	100%			8,476
Bartow	14,559	100%			14,559
Ben Hill	1,529	100%			1,529
Berrien	3,014	100%			3,014
Bibb	11,137	100%			11,137
Bleckley	1,684	100%			1,684
Brantley	3,442	100%			3,442
Brooks	1,680	100%			1,680
Bryan	5,639	100%			5,639
Bulloch	8,846	100%			8,846
Burke	1,569	100%			1,569
Butts	3,313	100%			3,313
Calhoun	162	100%			162
Camden	4,600	100%			4,600
Candler	1,510	100%			1,510
Carroll	15,290	100%			15,290
Catoosa	9,604	100%			9,604
Charlton	1,921	100%			1,921
Chatham	18,680	100%			18,680
Chattahoochee	244	100%			244
Chattooga	4,225	100%			4,225
Cherokee	35,457	100%			35,457
Clarke	5,004	100%			5,004
Clay	278	100%			278
Clayton	4,522	100%			4,522
Clinch	1,530	100%			1,530
Cobb	63,696	100%			63,696
Coffee	4,931	100%			4,931
Colquitt	5,139	100%			5,139
Columbia	17,358	100%			17,358
Cook	1,854	100%			1,854
Coweta	17,274	100%			17,274
Crawford	1,593	100%			1,593
Crisp	2,685	100%			2,685
Dade	3,070	100%			3,070
Dawson	5,978	100%			5,978
Decatur	1,497	100%			1,497
DeKalb	17,425	100%			17,425
Dodge	3,799	100%			3,799
Dooly	551	100%			551
Dougherty	3,571	100%			3,571
Douglas	8,079	100%			8,079
Early	1,241	100%			1,241
Echols	772	100%			772
Effingham	8,411	100%			8,411
Elbert	2,624	100%			2,624
Emanuel	4,431	100%			4,431
Evans	1,216	100%			1,216
Fannin	5,799	100%			5,799
Fayette	14,697	100%			14,697
Floyd	13,227	100%			13,227
Forsyth	28,848	100%			28,848
Franklin	5,238	100%			5,238
Fulton	33,861	100%			33,861
Gilmer	6,445	100%			6,445
Glascock	992	100%			992
Glynn	9,701	100%			9,701
Gordon	7,735	100%			7,735
Grady	3,649	100%			3,649
Greene	2,953	100%			2,953
Gwinnett	57,897	100%			57,897
Habersham	9,012	100%			9,012
Hall	26,186	100%			26,186
Hancock	360	100%			360
Haralson	6,672	100%			6,672
Harris	4,942	100%			4,942
Hart	4,725	100%			4,725
Heard	2,120	100%			2,120
Henry	17,417	100%			17,417
Houston	14,177	100%			14,177
Irwin	1,866	100%			1,866
Jackson	11,558	100%			11,558
Jasper	2,289	100%			2,289
Jeff Davis	2,579	100%			2,579
Jefferson	638	100%			638
Jenkins	295	100%			295
Johnson	1,676	100%			1,676
Jones	3,709	100%			3,709
Lamar	2,490	100%			2,490
Lanier	1,054	100%			1,054
Laurens	5,086	100%			5,086
Lee	4,868	100%			4,868
Liberty	1,606	100%			1,606
Lincoln	1,615	100%			1,615
Long	1,623	100%			1,623
Lowndes	7,080	100%			7,080
Lumpkin	6,109	100%			6,109
Macon	406	100%			406
Madison	5,594	100%			5,594
Marion	1,113	100%			1,113
McDuffie	2,068	100%			2,068
McIntosh	2,098	100%			2,098
Meriwether	2,569	100%			2,569
Miller	634	100%			634
Mitchell	2,137	100%			2,137
Monroe	4,805	100%			4,805
Montgomery	1,711	100%			1,711
Morgan	4,085	100%			4,085
Murray	6,677	100%			6,677
Muscogee	9,287	100%			9,287
Newton	10,069	100%			10,069
Oconee	8,178	100%			8,178
Oglethorpe	3,273	100%			3,273
Paulding	19,958	100%			19,958
Peach	2,068	100%			2,068
Pickens	7,114	100%			7,114
Pierce	4,253	100%			4,253
Pike	4,210	100%			4,210
Polk	6,432	100%			6,432
Pulaski	1,525	100%			1,525
Putnam	3,870	100%			3,870
Quitman	146	100%			146
Rabun	3,295	100%			3,295
Randolph	243	100%			243
Richmond	10,678	100%			10,678
Rockdale	4,421	100%			4,421
Schley	1,103	100%			1,103
Screven	1,157	100%			1,157
Seminole	984	100%			984
Spalding	7,096	100%			7,096
Stephens	4,461	100%			4,461
Stewart	214	100%			214
Sumter	2,449	100%			2,449
Talbot	460	100%			460
Taliaferro	90	100%			90
Tattnall	3,350	100%			3,350
Taylor	1,234	100%			1,234
Telfair	1,196	100%			1,196
Terrell	680	100%			680
Thomas	3,380	100%			3,380
Tift	4,964	100%			4,964
Toombs	4,065	100%			4,065
Towns	3,244	100%			3,244
Treutlen	1,062	100%			1,062
Troup	8,652	100%			8,652
Turner	1,107	100%			1,107
Twiggs	556	100%			556
Union	5,242	100%			5,242
Upson	4,256	100%			4,256
Walker	10,439	100%			10,439
Walton	15,253	100%			15,253
Ware	4,780	100%			4,780
Warren	326	100%			326
Washington	588	100%			588
Wayne	4,964	100%			4,964
Webster	70	100%			70
Wheeler	626	100%			626
White	6,475	100%			6,475
Whitfield	11,335	100%			11,335
Wilcox	1,189	100%			1,189
Wilkes	915	100%			915
Wilkinson	890	100%			890
Worth	3,496	100%			3,496
Total	947,352	100%			947,352
