= Community Foundation for Northeast Georgia =

- Location: Duluth, Georgia
- Region served: Northeast Georgia
- Method: Donations and Grants
- Leader: DePriest Waddy
- Website: www.cfneg.org/

The Community Foundation for Northeast Georgia began operating as the Gwinnett Foundation, Inc. a nonprofit community foundation on March 25, 1985.

The CFNEG manages charitable funds for individuals, non-profit organizations and businesses. Most of the foundation's funds are donor advised. These funds are pooled for investment purposes and used to make grants for a variety of charitable purposes.

== History ==
The Community Foundation for Northeast Georgia was founded to receive and disburse charitable funds for an improved quality of life throughout Gwinnett County.

After a capital campaign provided the initial seed money, the foundation received a major boost in 1987, due to the efforts of the late Robert D. Fowler. Under his leadership, he and the other owners of the Gwinnett Daily News offered a $1 million challenge grant, which was matched by the community. The board of directors voted to change the name to the Community Foundation for Northeast Georgia in March 2002, formally recognizing the regional growth from Gwinnett and the surrounding 3 counties of Barrow, North Fulton and Forsyth to the Northeast Georgia Counties of Clarke, Jackson, Madison, Greene, Oconee and Walton.

== Impact ==
The Community Foundation for Northeast Georgia and its donors have given back over $52 Million to the community since 1985. In 2012-13 the Foundation received more than $5.5 Million in donor contributions and funded more than $6 Million in grants. Assets have grown o more than $1.1 Million, .
