= 2020 United States presidential primary elections =

== Democratic Party nomination ==
=== Primaries ===
In August 2018, the Democratic National Committee voted to disallow superdelegates from voting on the first ballot of the nominating process, beginning with the 2020 election. This required a candidate to win a majority of pledged delegates from the assorted primary elections in order to win the party's nomination. The last time this did not occur was the nomination of Adlai Stevenson II at the 1952 Democratic National Convention. Meanwhile, six states used ranked-choice voting in the primaries: Alaska, Hawaii, Kansas, and Wyoming for all voters; and Iowa and Nevada for absentee voters.

After Hillary Clinton's loss in the previous election, the Democratic Party was seen largely as leaderless, and was also seen as fractured between the centrist Clinton wing and the more progressive Sanders wing of the party, echoing the rift brought up in the 2016 primary election. In 2018, several U.S. House districts that Democrats hoped to gain from the Republican majority had contentious primary elections. Politico's Elena Schneider described these clashes as a "Democratic civil war". During this period, there was a general shift to the left in regards to college tuition, healthcare, and immigration among Democrats in the Senate.

Overall, the 2020 primary field had 29 major candidates, breaking the record for the largest field under the modern presidential primary system previously set during the 2016 Republican Party presidential primaries with 17 major candidates.

Entering the Iowa caucuses on February 3, 2020, the field had decreased to 11 major candidates. Results were delayed in Iowa, with Pete Buttigieg winning in state delegate equivalents despite Bernie Sanders winning more votes, followed by Sanders narrowly winning over Buttigieg in the February 11, New Hampshire primary. Following Michael Bennet, Deval Patrick, and Andrew Yang dropping out, Sanders won the Nevada caucuses on February 22. Joe Biden then won the South Carolina primary, causing Buttigieg, Amy Klobuchar, and Tom Steyer to abandon their campaigns (Buttigieg and Klobuchar then immediately endorsed Biden). After Super Tuesday, March 3, Michael Bloomberg and Elizabeth Warren quit the race, leaving three candidates left: Biden and Sanders, the main contenders, and Tulsi Gabbard, who remained in the race despite facing nigh-on insurmountable odds. Gabbard then dropped out and endorsed Biden after the March 17, Arizona, Florida, and Illinois races. On April 8, 2020, Sanders dropped out, reportedly after being convinced by former president Barack Obama, leaving Biden as the only major candidate remaining, and the presumptive nominee. Biden then gained endorsements from Obama, Sanders and Warren. By June 5, 2020, Biden had officially gained enough delegates to ensure his nomination at the convention, and proceeded to work with Sanders to develop a joint policy task force.

=== Vice presidential selection ===
Senator Kamala Harris was announced as former Vice President Joe Biden's running mate on August 11, 2020. Harris is the first woman, first African-American, and first Asian-American vice president of the United States, as well as the second person with non-European ancestry (after Herbert Hoover's vice-president Charles Curtis). She is the third female vice presidential running mate after Geraldine Ferraro in 1984 and Sarah Palin in 2008. She is the first person representing the Western United States to appear on the Democratic Party presidential ticket.

=== Nominee ===
2020 Democratic Party ticket
Joe Biden	Kamala Harris
for President	for Vice President
47th Vice President of the United States (2009–2017)	U.S. senator from California (2017–2021)

=== Candidates ===
The following major candidates have either (a) served as vice president, a member of the cabinet, a U.S. senator, a U.S. representative, or a governor, (b) been included in a minimum of five independent national polls, or (c) received substantial media coverage.

Candidates in this section are sorted by date of withdrawal
Bernie Sanders	Tulsi Gabbard	Elizabeth Warren	Michael Bloomberg	Amy Klobuchar	Pete Buttigieg	Tom Steyer
U.S. senator from Vermont (2007–present); U.S. representative from VT-AL (1991–2007); Mayor of Burlington, Vermont (1981–1989)	U.S. representative from HI-02 (2013–2021)	U.S. senator from Massachusetts (2013–present)	Mayor of New York City, New York (2002–2013); CEO of Bloomberg L.P.	U.S. senator from Minnesota (2007–present)	Mayor of South Bend, Indiana (2012–2020)	Hedge fund manager Founder of Farallon Capital and Beneficial State Bank
Campaign	Campaign	Campaign	Campaign	Campaign	Campaign	Campaign
W: April 8, 2020 (endorsed Biden); 8,823,936 votes 1,073 delegates	W: March 19, 2020 (endorsed Biden); 233,079 votes 2 delegates	W: March 5, 2020 (endorsed Biden); 2,668,057 votes 58 delegates	W: March 4, 2020 (endorsed Biden); 2,430,062 votes 43 delegates	W: March 2, 2020 (endorsed Biden); 501,332 votes 7 delegates	W: March 1, 2020 (endorsed Biden); 874,727 votes 21 delegates	W: February 29, 2020 (endorsed Biden); 250,513 votes
Deval Patrick	Michael Bennet	Andrew Yang	John Delaney	Cory Booker	Marianne Williamson	Julián Castro
Governor of Massachusetts (2007–2015)	U.S. senator from Colorado (2009–present)	Entrepreneur; Founder of Venture for America	U.S. representative from MD-06 (2013–2019)	U.S. senator from New Jersey (2013–present); Mayor of Newark, New Jersey (2006–2013)	Author; Founder of Project Angel Food; Independent candidate for U.S. House from CA-33 in 2014	Secretary of Housing and Urban Development (2014–2017); Mayor of San Antonio, Texas (2009–2014)
Campaign	Campaign	Campaign	Campaign	Campaign	Campaign	Campaign
W: February 12, 2020 (endorsed Biden); 20,761 votes	W: February 11, 2020 (endorsed Biden); 43,682 votes	W: February 11, 2020 (endorsed Biden); 119,862 votes	W: January 31, 2020 (endorsed Biden); 15,985 votes	W: January 13, 2020 (endorsed Biden); 30,191 votes	W: January 10, 2020 (endorsed Sanders); 21,993 votes	W: January 2, 2020 (endorsed Warren, then Biden); 36,694 votes
Kamala Harris	Steve Bullock	Joe Sestak	Wayne Messam	Beto O'Rourke	Tim Ryan	Bill de Blasio
U.S. senator from California (2017–2021); Attorney General of California (2011–2017)	Governor of Montana (2013–2021); Attorney General of Montana (2009–2013)	U.S. representative from PA-07 (2007–2011); Former vice admiral of the United States Navy	Mayor of Miramar, Florida (2015–present)	U.S. representative from TX-16 (2013–2019)	U.S. representative from OH-13 (2013–2023); U.S. representative from OH-17 (2003–2013)	Mayor of New York City, New York (2014–2021)
		—N/a				
Campaign	Campaign	Campaign	Campaign	Campaign	Campaign	Campaign
W: December 3, 2019 (endorsed Biden and nominated for vice president); 844 votes	W: December 2, 2019 549 votes	W: December 1, 2019 (endorsed Klobuchar); 5,251 votes	W: November 19, 2019 0 votes (Note: Candidate did not appear on any ballots.)	W: November 1, 2019 (endorsed Biden); 1 vote	W: October 24, 2019 (endorsed Biden); 0 votes	W: September 20, 2019 (endorsed Sanders); 0 votes
Kirsten Gillibrand	Seth Moulton	Jay Inslee	John Hickenlooper	Mike Gravel	Eric Swalwell	Richard Ojeda
U.S. senator from New York (2009–present); U.S. representative from NY-20 (2007–2009)	U.S. representative from MA-06 (2015–present)	Governor of Washington (2013–2025); U.S. representative from WA-01 (1999–2012); U.S. representative from WA-04 (1993–1995)	Governor of Colorado (2011–2019); Mayor of Denver, Colorado (2003–2011)	U.S. senator from Alaska (1969–1981)	U.S. representative from CA-15 (2013–present)	West Virginia state senator from WV-SD07 (2016–2019)
						—N/a
Campaign	Campaign	Campaign	Campaign	Campaign	Campaign	Campaign
W: August 28, 2019 (endorsed Biden); 0 votes	W: August 23, 2019 (endorsed Biden); 0 votes	W: August 21, 2019 (endorsed Biden); 1 vote	W: August 15, 2019 (endorsed Bennet); 1 vote	W: August 6, 2019 (endorsed Gabbard and Sanders, then Howie Hawkins); 0 votes	W: July 8, 2019 0 votes	W: January 25, 2019 0 votes

== Republican Party nomination ==
=== Primaries ===
In election cycles with incumbent presidents running for re-election, the race for the party nomination is usually pro-forma, with token opposition instead of any serious challengers and with their party rules being fixed in their favor. The 2020 election was not an exception; with Donald Trump formally seeking a second term, the official Republican apparatus, both state and national, coordinated with his campaign to implement changes to make it difficult for any primary opponent to mount a serious challenge. On January 25, 2019, the Republican National Committee unofficially endorsed Trump.

Several Republican state committees scrapped their respective primaries or caucuses, citing the fact that Republicans canceled several state primaries when George H. W. Bush and George W. Bush sought a second term in 1992 and 2004, respectively; and Democrats scrapped some of their primaries when Bill Clinton and Barack Obama were seeking reelection in 1996 and 2012, respectively. After cancelling their races, some states immediately pledged their delegates to Trump, while other states later held a convention or meeting to officially award their delegates to him.

The Trump campaign also urged Republican state committees that used proportional methods to award delegates in 2016 (where a state's delegates are divided proportionally among the candidates based on the vote percentage) to switch to a "winner-takes-all" (where the winning candidate in a state gets all its delegates) or "winner-takes-most" (where the winning candidate only wins all of the state's delegates if he exceeds a predetermined amount, otherwise they are divided proportionally) for 2020.

Nevertheless, reports arose beginning in August 2017 that members of the Republican Party were preparing a "shadow campaign" against the president, particularly from the party's moderate or establishment wings. Then-Arizona senator John McCain said, "Republicans see weakness in this president." Maine senator Susan Collins, Kentucky senator Rand Paul, and former New Jersey Governor Chris Christie all expressed doubts in 2017 that Trump would be the 2020 nominee. Senator Jeff Flake claimed in 2017 that Trump was "inviting" a primary challenger by the way he was governing.

Former Massachusetts Governor Bill Weld became Trump's first major challenger in the Republican primaries following an announcement on April 15, 2019. Weld, who was the Libertarian Party's nominee for vice president in 2016, was considered a long shot because of Trump's popularity within his own party and Weld's positions on issues such as abortion, gun control and same-sex marriage that conflicted with conservative positions on those issues. In addition, businessman Rocky De La Fuente also entered the race but was not widely recognized as a major candidate.

Former Illinois representative Joe Walsh launched a primary challenge on August 25, 2019, saying he would not vote for Trump if Trump became the nominee. Walsh ended his presidential bid on February 7, 2020, after drawing around 1% support in the Iowa caucuses. Walsh declared that "nobody can beat Trump in a Republican primary" because the Republican Party was now "a cult" of Trump. On September 8, 2019, former South Carolina Governor and representative Mark Sanford officially announced that he would be another Republican primary challenger to Trump. He dropped out of the race 65 days later on November 12, 2019, after failing to gain support in Republican circles.

Trump's re-election campaign has essentially been ongoing since his victory in 2016, leading pundits to describe his tactic of holding rallies continuously throughout his presidency as a "never-ending campaign". On January 20, 2017, at 5:11 p.m. EST, he submitted a letter as a substitute of FEC Form 2, by which he reached the legal threshold for filing, in compliance with the Federal Election Campaign Act. During the primary season, Trump ran an active campaign, even holding rallies in the February primary states, including South Carolina and Nevada where Republican primaries were canceled. Trump won every race and, having won enough delegates to ensure his nomination at the convention, became the presumptive nominee on March 17, 2020. Weld suspended his campaign the next day.

=== Nominee ===
2020 Republican Party ticket
Donald Trump	Mike Pence
for President	for Vice President
45th President of the United States (2017-2021)	48th Vice President of the United States (2017–2021)

=== Candidates ===
The following major candidates have either (a) held public office, (b) been included in a minimum of five independent national polls, or (c) received substantial media coverage.

Candidates in this section are sorted by popular vote
Bill Weld	Joe Walsh	Rocky De La Fuente	Mark Sanford
Governor of Massachusetts (1991–1997)	U.S. representative from IL-08 (2011–2013)	Businessman and perennial candidate	U.S. representative from SC-01 (1995–2001, 2013–2019); Governor of South Carolina (2003–2011)
Campaign	Campaign	Campaign	Campaign
W: March 18, 2020; 454,402 votes 1 delegate	W: February 7, 2020; 173,519 votes	Accepted; 3rd party nomination April 23, 2020; 108,357 votes	W: November 12, 2019; 4,258 votes

== Other parties and independent candidates ==
=== Libertarian Party nomination ===
Jo Jorgensen, who was the running mate of author Harry Browne in 1996, received the Libertarian nomination at the national convention on May 23, 2020. She achieved ballot access in all 50 states and the District of Columbia.

==== Nominee ====
2020 Libertarian Party ticket
Jo Jorgensen	Spike Cohen
for President	for Vice President
Senior Lecturer at Clemson University	Podcaster and businessman

=== Green Party nomination ===
Howie Hawkins became the presumptive nominee of the Green Party on June 21, 2020, and was officially nominated by the party on July 11, 2020. Hawkins was also nominated by the Socialist Party USA, Socialist Alternative, and the Legal Marijuana Now Party. Hawkins secured ballot access to 381 electoral votes and write-in access to 130 electoral votes. (Note: Although claimed in Hawkins's campaign website, he did not obtain write-in access in Montana.)

==== Nominee ====
2020 Green Party ticket
Howie Hawkins	Angela Walker
for President	for Vice President
Co-founder of the Green Party	ATU Local 998 Legislative Director (2011–2013)

=== Other third-party and independent candidates ===
Various other minor party and independent candidates were on the ballot in several states, among them activist and writer Gloria La Riva, businessman and perennial candidate Rocky De La Fuente, coal executive Don Blankenship, entrepreneur Brock Pierce, rapper Kanye West, and educator Brian Carroll.

== See also ==
- Protests against Donald Trump
- Social media in the 2020 United States presidential election
- 2020 United States gubernatorial elections
