= Results of the 2020 Republican Party presidential primaries =

2020 Republican Party presidential primaries
- February 3 to August 11, 2020

2,550 delegate votes (2,443 pledged and 107 unpledged) to the Republican National Convention 1,276 delegates votes needed to win

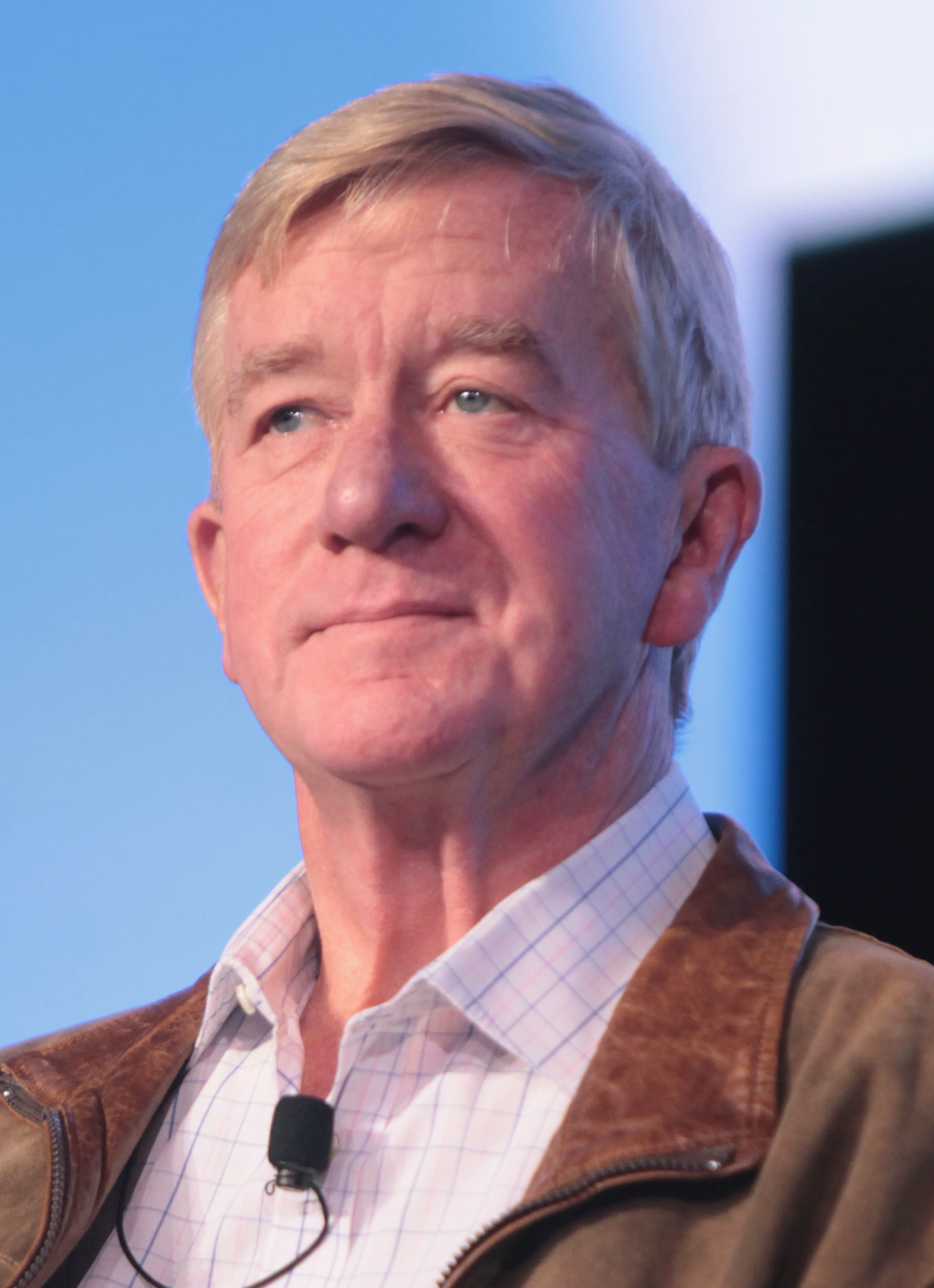
Candidate	Donald Trump	Bill Weld
Home state	Florida	Massachusetts
Delegate count	2,549	1
Contests won	56 (Note: Because Trump was the only candidate to declare for its ballot by the deadline, the Hawaii Republican Party automatically awarded its national pledged delegates to him on December 11, 2019.) (Note: Kansas' state committee, at the state convention, passed a resolution binding its delegates to Trump on February 1, 2020.)	0
Popular vote	18,159,752	454,402
Percentage	93.99%	2.35%
First place by first-instance vote
Donald Trump
Previous Republican nominee
Donald Trump
Republican nominee
Donald Trump

Below is a detailed tally of the results of the 2020 Republican Party presidential primary elections in the United States. In most U.S. states outside New Hampshire, votes for write-in candidates remain untallied.

Primary elections and caucuses can be binding or nonbinding in allocating delegates to the respective state delegations to the Republican National Convention. But the actual election of the delegates can be at a later date. Delegates are (1) elected at conventions, (2) from slates submitted by the candidates, (3) selected by the party's state chairman or (4) at committee meetings or (5) elected directly at the party's caucuses and primaries. Until the delegates are apportioned, the delegate numbers are by nature projections, but it is only in the states with nonbinding caucuses where they are not allocated at the primary or caucus date.

Several states decided to cancel their primaries and caucuses. They cited the fact that Republicans canceled several state primaries when George H. W. Bush and George W. Bush sought a second term in 1992 and 2004, respectively, and Democrats scrapped some of their primaries when Bill Clinton and Barack Obama were seeking reelection in 1996 and 2012, respectively. Hawaii was the only state among the cancelled races to officially appoint their pledged delegates immediately to incumbent President Donald Trump in 2019. Donald Trump's over 18 million votes he received in the Republican Primary is the most ever for an incumbent President in a primary.

== Overview of results ==
=== Major candidates ===
The table below shows the four candidates that have either (a) held public office, (b) been included in a minimum of five independent national polls, or (c) received substantial media coverage. The president's challengers withdrew from the race after the primaries started, or in the case of De la Fuente, accepted one or more 3rd party nominations.

Dates	Candidates	Donald Trump	Bill Weld	Rocky De La Fuente	Joe Walsh	Total delegates, pledged (unpledged/total), and votes
	Pledged delegates (unpledged / soft total) (Total awarded: 2,312)	2,311 (38 / 2,273); 90.63%	1 (0 / 1); 0.04%	0 (0 / 0); 0%	0 (0 / 0); 0%	2,443 (107 / 2,550) (90.67% awarded) 19,321,267 votes
	Popular votes	18,159,752 (93.99%)	454,402 (2.35%)	108,357 (0.56%)	173,519 (0.90%)	2,443 (107 / 2,550) (90.67% awarded) 19,321,267 votes
Dec. 11, 2019	~~Hawaii~~; Cancelled binding caucuses	100% (19 delegates) (N/A votes)	Caucus cancelled			19 (0/19) (N/A votes)
Feb. 1, 2020	Kansas; State convention	100% (39 delegates) (N/A votes)	Primary cancelled			39 (0/39) (N/A votes)
Feb. 3, 2020	Iowa; Proportional, binding precinct caucuses	97.14% (39 delegates) (31,421 votes)	1.31% (1 delegate) (425 votes)	listed with "Other" candidates	1.08% (348 votes)	40 (0/40) (32,345 votes)
Feb. 11, 2020	New Hampshire; Proportional, binding primary	84.42% (22 delegates) (129,734 votes)	9.01% (13,844 votes)	0.10% (148 votes)	0.55% (838 votes)	22 (0/22) (153,674 votes)
Feb. 22, 2020	Nevada; State central committee meeting	100% (25 delegates) (N/A votes)	Caucus cancelled			25 (0/25) (N/A votes)
Mar. 3, 2020	Alabama; Proportional, binding primary	96.22% (50 delegates) (696,832 votes)	1.52% (10,978 votes)			50 (0/50) (724,222 votes)
Mar. 3, 2020	Arkansas; Proportional, binding primary	97.13% (40 delegates) (238,980 votes)	2.12% (5,216 votes)	0.75% (1,848 votes)	-	40 (0/40) (246,044 votes)
Mar. 3, 2020	California; Proportional, binding primary	92.21% (172 delegates) (2,279,086 votes)	2.71% (66,904 votes)	0.99% (24,351 votes)	2.62% (64,749 votes)	172 (0/172) (2,471,580)
Mar. 3, 2020	Colorado; Proportional, binding primary	92.26% (37 delegates) (628,876 votes)	3.77% (25,698 votes)		1.92% (13,072 votes)	37 (0/37) (681,623 votes)
Mar. 3, 2020	Maine; Proportional, binding primary	83.85% (22 delegates) (95,360 votes)	-	-	-	22 (0/22) (113,728 votes)
Mar. 3, 2020	Massachusetts; Proportional, binding primary	86.32% (41 delegates) (239,115 votes)	9.18% (25,425 votes)	0.24% (675 votes)	1.09% (3,008 votes)	41 (0/41) (277,002 votes)
Mar. 3, 2020	Minnesota; Proportional, binding primary	97.67% (39 delegates) (137,275 votes)	0.32% (443 votes)	0.01% (16 votes)	-	39 (0/39) (140,555 votes)
Mar. 3, 2020	~~New York~~; Cancelled, binding primary	100% (94 delegates) (N/A votes)	Primary cancelled			94 (0/94) (N/A votes)
Mar. 3, 2020	North Carolina; Proportional, binding primary	93.53% (71 delegates) (750,600 votes)	1.93% (15,486 votes)		2.04% (16,356 votes)	71 (0/71) (802,527 votes)
Mar. 3, 2020	Oklahoma; Proportional, binding primary	92.60% (43 delegates) (273,738 votes)		0.83% (2,466 votes)	3.72% (10,996 votes)	43 (0/43) (295,601 votes)
Mar. 3, 2020	Tennessee; Proportional, binding primary	96.47% (58 delegates) (384,266 votes)	0.98% (3,922 votes)		1.05% (4,178 votes)	58 (0/58) (398,314 votes)
Mar. 3, 2020	Texas; Proportional, binding primary	94.13% (155 delegates) (1,898,664 votes)	0.78% (15,824 votes)	0.37% (7,563 votes)	0.73% (14,772 votes)	155 (0/155) (2,017,167 votes)
Mar. 3, 2020	Utah; Proportional, binding primary	87.79% (40 delegates) (302,751 votes)	6.86% (23,652 votes)	-	2.18% (7,509 votes)	40 (0/40) (344,852 votes)
Mar. 3, 2020	Vermont; Proportional, binding primary	86.49% (17 delegates) (33,984 votes)	10.11% (3,971 votes)	0.87% (341 votes)		17 (0/17) (39,291 votes)
Mar. 10, 2020	Idaho; Proportional, binding primary	94.46% (32 delegates) (112,373 votes)	2.09% (2,486 votes)	0.54% (637 votes)	1.97% (2,341 votes)	32 (0/32) (118,958 votes)
Mar. 10, 2020	Michigan; Proportional, binding primary	93.72% (73 delegates) (640,522 votes)	0.89% (6,099 votes)	-	0.60% (4,067 votes)	73 (0/73) (683,431 votes)
Mar. 10, 2020	Mississippi; Proportional, binding primary	98.62% (40 delegates) (241,985 votes)	0.94% (2,311 votes)	0.44% (1,085 votes)	-	40 (0/40) (245,381 votes)
Mar. 10, 2020	Missouri; Proportional, binding primary	96.84% (54 delegates) (301,953 votes)	0.70% (2,171 votes)	-	0.65% (2,015 votes)	54 (0/54) (311,793 votes)
Mar. 10, 2020	Washington; Proportional, binding primary	98.41% (43 delegates) (684,239 votes)				43 (0/43) (695,275 votes)
Mar. 17, 2020	Florida; Winner-Take-All, binding primary	93.79% (122 delegates) (1,162,984 votes)	3.17% (39,319 votes)	0.98% (12,172 votes)	2.05% (25,464 votes)	122 (0/122) (1,239,939 votes)
Mar. 17, 2020	Illinois; Proportional, binding primary	95.98% (67 delegates) (520,956 votes)	-	4.02% (21,833 votes)	-	67 (0/67) (542,800 votes)
Apr. 7, 2020	Wisconsin; Proportional, binding primary	97.87% (52 delegates) (616,782 votes)				52 (0/52) (630,198 votes)
Apr. 24, 2020	North Dakota; State convention	100% (29 delegates) (N/A votes)	Caucus cancelled			0 (29/29) (N/A votes)
Apr 28, 2020	Ohio; Proportional, binding primary	100% (82 delegates) (713,546 votes)	-	-	-	82 (0/82) (713,546 votes)
May 1, 2020	Virginia; State convention	100% (48 delegates) (N/A votes)	Primary cancelled			48 (0/48) (N/A votes)
May 9, 2020	Arizona; State convention	100% (57 delegates) (N/A votes)	Primary cancelled			57 (0/57) (N/A votes)
May 12, 2020	Nebraska; Proportional, binding primary	91.40% (36 delegates) (243,721 votes)	8.60% (22,934 votes)			36 (0/36) (266,655 votes)
May 19, 2020	Oregon; Proportional, binding primary	93.71% (28 delegates) (361,010 votes)				28 (0/28) (385,257 votes)
June 2, 2020	Maryland; Proportional, binding primary	86.83% (38 delegates) (297,198 votes)	13.17% (45,092 votes)	-	-	38 (0/38) (342,290 votes)
June 2, 2020	District of Columbia; Proportional, binding primary	100% (19 delegates) (1,559 votes)				19 (0/19) (1,559 votes)
June 2, 2020	Pennsylvania; Proportional, binding primary	92.14% (34 delegates) (1,053,616 votes)	6.07% (69,427 votes)	1.79% (20,456 votes)		34 (54/88) (1,143,499 votes)
June 2, 2020	Rhode Island; Proportional, binding primary	87.13% (19 delegates) (19,176 votes)	5.52% (1,214 votes)	0.83% (182 votes)	-	19 (0/19) (22,009 votes)
June 2, 2020	Montana; Proportional, binding primary	93.82% (27 delegates) (200,174 votes)				27 (0/27) (213,358 votes)
June 2, 2020	New Mexico; Proportional, binding primary	91.25% (22 delegates) (144,067 votes)				22 (0/22) (157,876 votes)
June 2, 2020	South Dakota; Proportional, binding primary	Primary cancelled				29 (0/29) (N/A votes)
June 2, 2020	Indiana; Proportional, binding primary	91.89% (58 delegates) (504,726 votes)	8.11% (44,520 votes)			58 (0/58) (549,246 votes)
June 5, 2020	Puerto Rico; Caucus	100% (23 delegates) (N/A votes)				23 (0/23) (N/A votes)
June 9, 2020	West Virginia; Proportional, binding primary	94.39% (35 delegates) (198,741 votes)	1.77% (0 delegates) (3,721 votes)	0.73% (0 delegates) (1,537 votes)	1.81% (0 delegates) (3,806 votes)	35 (0/35) (210,557 votes)
June 9, 2020	Georgia; Proportional, binding primary	100% (76 delegates) (947,352 votes)	(0 delegates) (0 votes)	(0 delegates) (0 votes)	(0 delegates) (0 votes)	76 (0/76) (947,352 votes)
June 23, 2020	Kentucky; Proportional, binding primary	86.65% (46 delegates) (371,723 votes)				46 (0/46) (429,006 votes)
July 7, 2020	New Jersey; Proportional, binding primary	100% (49 delegates) (404,214 votes)				49 (0/49) (404,214 votes)
July 7, 2020	Delaware; Proportional, binding primary	88.05% (16 delegates) (28,876 votes)		11.95% (0 delegates) (3,920 votes)		16 (0/16) (32,796 votes)
July 11, 2020	Louisiana; Proportional, binding primary	95.90% (46 delegates) (195,910 votes)	1.65% (0 delegates) (3,320 votes)	1.14% (0 delegates) (2,336 votes)		46 (0/46) (204,295 votes)
Aug. 11, 2020	Connecticut; Proportional, binding primary	78.37% (28 delegates) (71,667 votes)	-	7.43% (0 delegates) (6,791 votes)		28 (0/28) (91,452 votes)

Not shown: Alaska, Wyoming, South Carolina, American Samoa, Guam, Virgin Islands, Northern Marianas

Legend:	1st place (popular vote)	2nd place (popular vote)	3rd place (popular vote)	Candidate has withdrawn	Candidate unable to appear on ballot

=== On the ballot in one or more states ===
The following other candidates are listed by the number of states, that they are on the ballot.

National popular vote totals for other candidates
Candidate	Votes	No. states on ballot
Uncommitted, "write-ins", errors, and other non-votes	206,920	Several†
Matthew John Matern	40,276	10 (CA, CO, ID, LA, MO, NH, OK, TX, UT, WV)
Bob Ely	11,956	8 (ID, MO, LA, NH, OK, TX, UT, WV)
Zoltan Istvan	14,291	5 (CA, CO, NH, OK, TX)
Robert Ardini	20,293	4 (CA, CO, NH, UT)
Mark Sanford	4,258	1 (MI)
Mary Maxwell	929	1 (NH)
Eric Merrill	524	1 (NH)
William N. Murphy	447	1 (NH)
Stephen B. Comley, Sr.	202	1 (NH)
Rick Kraft	109	1 (NH)
Juan Payne	83	1 (NH)
President R. Boddie	72	1 (NH)
Larry Horn	65	1 (NH)
Star Locke	66	1 (NH)

†Several states provide the number of write-in votes without specifying who they're for.

== Results ==
As President Trump ran unopposed in several state primaries, and caucuses were canceled to grant him bound delegations by fiat, only contested elections will be listed below.

=== Early states ===
==== Iowa ====
The Iowa Republican caucus was held on February 3, 2020.

Counties won by these popular vote results
Map legend
- Trump—100%
- Trump—≥95%
- Trump—90–95%
- Trump—85–90%

Congressional districts won by these popular vote results
Map legend
- Trump—≥95%

2020 Iowa Republican presidential caucuses
Candidate	Votes	%	Estimated delegates
Donald Trump (incumbent)	31,421	97.14	39
Bill Weld	425	1.31	1
Joe Walsh	348	1.08	0
Other	151	0.47	0
Total	32,345	100%	40

==== New Hampshire ====
The New Hampshire Republican primary took place on February 11, 2020. Typically, the top candidates of the other major party receive a large number of write-in votes.

County won by these popular vote results:
Trump—85–90%
Trump—80–85%

Congressional district won by these popular vote results:
Trump—80–85%

2020 New Hampshire Republican primary
Candidate	Votes	%	Estimated delegates
Donald Trump (incumbent)	129,734	84.42	22
Bill Weld	13,844	9.01	0
Joe Walsh (withdrawn)	838	0.55	0
Mitt Romney (write-in)	632	0.41	0
Rocky De La Fuente	148	0.10	0
Robert Ardini	77	0.05	0
Bob Ely	68	0.04	0
Zoltan Istvan	56	0.04	0
Others / Write-in	2,339	1.52	0
Pete Buttigieg (write-in Democratic)	1,136	0.74	0
Amy Klobuchar (write-in Democratic)	1,076	0.70	0
Mike Bloomberg (write-in Democratic)	801	0.52	0
Bernie Sanders (write-in Democratic)	753	0.49	0
Tulsi Gabbard (write-in Democratic)	369	0.24	0
Joe Biden (write-in Democratic)	330	0.21	0
Tom Steyer (write-in Democratic)	191	0.12	0
Andrew Yang (write-in Democratic)	162	0.11	0
Elizabeth Warren (write-in Democratic)	157	0.10	0
Other write-in Democrats	963	0.63	0
Total	153,674	100%	22

=== Super Tuesday (March 3, 2020) ===
Super Tuesday began with the start of early voting in Minnesota on January 17, 2020, followed by Vermont the following day. By the end of February, all 14 states holding primaries had a substantial number of votes already cast.

In Minnesota, Georgia and Maine, the president ran unopposed.

==== Alabama ====
Former Massachusetts Governor Bill Weld challenged incumbent president Donald Trump in the Republican primary in Alabama. Trump received 96.22% of the vote and all 50 delegates, while Weld received only 1.52% of the vote. Uncommitted votes made up the other 2.27%.

2020 Alabama Republican presidential primary
Candidate	Popular vote		Delegates
Candidate	Count	Percentage	Delegates
Donald Trump (incumbent)	695,470	96.22%	50
Bill Weld	10,962	1.52%	0
Uncommitted	16,378	2.27%	0
Total	722,809	100%	50

==== Arkansas ====
The following candidates are on the ballot.

2020 Arkansas Republican presidential primary
Candidate	Popular vote		Delegates
Candidate	Count	Percentage	Delegates
Donald Trump	238,980	97.13%	40
Bill Weld	5,216	2.12%	0
Rocky De La Fuente	1,848	0.75%	0
Total	246,044	100%	40

==== California ====
2020 California Republican presidential primary
Candidate	Votes	%	Estimated delegates
Donald Trump	2,279,120	92.2%	172
Bill Weld	66,904	2.7%	0
Joe Walsh (withdrawn)	64,749	2.6%	0
Rocky De La Fuente	24,351	1.0%	0
Matthew John Matern	15,469	0.6%	0
Robert Ardini	12,857	0.5%	0
Zoltan Istvan	8,141	0.3%	0
Total	2,471,591	100%	

==== Colorado ====
2020 Colorado Republican presidential primary
Candidate	Votes	%	Estimated delegates
Donald Trump (incumbent)	628,876	92.26	37
Bill Weld	25,698	3.77	0
Joe Walsh (withdrawn)	13,072	1.92	0
Matthew John Matern	7,239	1.06	0
Robert Ardini	3,388	0.50	0
Zoltan Istvan	3,350	0.49	0
Total	681,623	100%	37

==== Massachusetts ====
2020 Massachusetts Republican presidential primary
Candidate	Popular vote		Delegates
Candidate	Count	Percentage	Delegates
Donald Trump (incumbent)	239,115	86.32	41
Bill Weld	25,425	9.18	0
Joe Walsh (withdrawn)	3,008	1.09	0
Rocky De La Fuente	675	0.24	0
No Preference	4,385	1.58	0
Blank ballots	2,242	0.81	0
All Others	2,152	0.78	0
Total	277,002	100%	41

==== North Carolina ====
2020 North Carolina Republican primary
Candidate	Popular vote		Delegates
Candidate	Count	Percentage	Delegates
Donald Trump	750,600	93.53%	71
Joe Walsh	16,356	2.04%	0
Bill Weld	15,486	1.93%	0
No Preference	20,085	2.50%	0
Total	802,527	100%	71

==== Oklahoma ====
Trump won the state in a landslide victory against his five opponents.

2020 Oklahoma Republican presidential primary
Candidate	Popular vote		Delegates
Candidate	Count	Percentage	Delegates
Donald Trump (incumbent)	273,738	92.60%	43
Joe Walsh (withdrawn)	10,996	3.72%	0
Matthew Matern	3,810	1.29%	0
Bob Ely	3,294	1.11%	0
Rocky De La Fuente	2,466	0.83%	0
Zoltan Istvan	1,297	0.44%	0
Total	295,601	100%	43

==== Tennessee ====
Incumbent United States President Donald Trump was challenged by two candidates: former congressman Joe Walsh of Illinois, and former governor Bill Weld of Massachusetts. Walsh withdrew from the race prior to the primary. There was also an uncommitted option on the ballot. Trump won the state in a landslide victory over Walsh and Weld.

2020 Tennessee Republican primary
Candidate	Votes	%	Estimated delegates
Donald Trump	384,266	96.47	58
Joe Walsh (withdrawn)	4,178	1.05	0
Bill Weld	3,922	0.98	0
Uncommitted	5,948	1.49	0
Total	398,314	100%	58

==== Texas ====
2020 Texas Republican Party presidential primary
Candidate	Popular vote		Delegates
Candidate	Count	Percentage	Delegates
Donald Trump (incumbent)	1,898,664	94.13%	117
Uncommitted	71,803	3.56%	0
Bill Weld	15,739	0.78%	0
Joe Walsh	15,824	0.78%	0
Rocky De La Fuente	7,563	0.38%	0
Bob Ely	3,582	0.37%	0
Matthew Matern	3,525	0.18%	0
Zoltan Istvan	1,447	0.07%	0
Total:	2,017,167	100%	155

==== Utah ====
2020 Utah Republican presidential primary
Candidate	Votes	%	Estimated delegates
Donald Trump (incumbent)	302,751	87.79%	40
Bill Weld	23,652	6.86%	0
Joe Walsh (withdrawn)	7,509	2.18%	0
Matthew John Matern	5,751	1.67%	0
Robert Ardini	3,971	1.15%	0
Bob Ely	1,218	0.35%	0
Total	344,852	100%	40

==== Vermont ====
2020 Vermont Republican primary
Candidate	Votes	%	Delegates
Donald Trump (incumbent)	33,984	86.49	17
Bill Weld	3,971	10.11	0
Rocky De La Fuente	341	0.87	0
Write-ins	480	1.22	0
Overvotes	37	0.09	0
Blank votes	478	1.22	0
Total	39,291	100%	17

=== March 10 ===
==== Idaho ====
Incumbent United States President Donald Trump was challenged by five candidates: businessman and perennial candidate Rocky De La Fuente of California, entrepreneur and investor Bob Ely of Massachusetts, entrepreneur and attorney Matthew Matern of Louisiana, former congressman Joe Walsh of Illinois, and former governor Bill Weld of Massachusetts. Walsh withdrew from the race prior to the primary.

2020 Idaho Republican presidential primary
Candidate	Votes	%	Estimated delegates
Donald Trump (incumbent)	112,373	94.46%	32
Bill Weld	2,486	2.09%	0
Joe Walsh (withdrawn)	2,341	1.97%	0
Matthew Matern	647	0.54%	0
Rocky De La Fuente	637	0.54%	0
Bob Ely	474	0.40%	0
Total	118,311	100%	32

==== Michigan ====
Incumbent United States President Donald Trump was challenged by three candidates: former governor Mark Sanford of South Carolina, former congressman Joe Walsh of Illinois, and former governor Bill Weld of Massachusetts. Sanford and Walsh both withdrew prior to the primary. Michigan is the only primary state where Sanford's name remained on the ballot.

2020 Michigan Republican primary
Candidate	Votes	%	Estimated delegates
Donald Trump (incumbent)	640,552	93.7%	73
Uncommitted	32,743	4.8%	0
Bill Weld	6,099	0.9%	0
Mark Sanford (withdrawn)	4,258	0.6%	0
Joe Walsh (withdrawn)	4,067	0.6%	0
Total	683,431	100%	73

==== Mississippi ====
Incumbent President Donald Trump was challenged by two candidates: businessman and perennial candidate Rocky De La Fuente of California, and former governor Bill Weld of Massachusetts.

2020 Mississippi Republican primary
Candidate	Votes	%	Estimated delegates
Donald Trump (incumbent)	240,125	98.6%	40
Bill Weld	2,292	0.9%	0
Rocky De La Fuente	1,078	0.4%	0
Total	243,495	100%	40

==== Missouri ====
2020 Missouri Republican presidential primary
Candidate	Votes	%	Estimated delegates
Donald Trump (incumbent)	301,953	96.8%	54
Uncommitted	4,216	1.4%	0
Bill Weld	2,171	0.7%	0
Joe Walsh (withdrawn)	2,015	0.6%	0
Bob Ely	844	0.3%	0
Matthew John Matern	594	0.2%	0
Total	311,793	100%	54

=== March 17 ===
==== Florida ====
2020 Florida Republican presidential primary
Candidate	Votes	%	Estimated delegates
Donald Trump (incumbent)	1,162,984	93.79	122
Bill Weld	39,319	3.17	
Joe Walsh (withdrawn)	25,464	2.05	
Rocky De La Fuente	12,172	0.98	
Total	1,239,939	100%	122
