= Opinion polling for the 2020 Republican Party presidential primaries =

This is a list of nationwide and statewide public opinion polls that have been conducted relating to the Republican primaries for the 2020 United States presidential election. The persons named in the polls are declared candidates or have received media speculation about their possible candidacy. The polls included are among Republicans or Republicans and Republican-leaning independents. If multiple versions of polls are provided, the version among likely voters is prioritized, then registered voters, then adults.

== Background ==
Nominee	Exploratory committee	Withdrawn candidate	
Midterm elections	Iowa caucuses	Super Tuesday	Republican convention

== National polling ==
Polling Aggregation
Source of poll aggregation	Date updated	Dates polled	Donald Trump	Bill Weld	Joe Walsh	Other and undecided (Note: Calculated by taking the difference of 100% and all other candidates combined)
270 to Win	Feb 19, 2020	,Feb 18 – 19, 2020	91.0%	5.0%	-	
RealClearPolitics	Feb 11, 2020	Dec 10, 2019 – Feb 11, 2020	89.3%	4.0%	3.5%	
Average			90.2%	4.5%	3.5%	1.8%

=== From February 2020 ===
Poll source	Date(s) administered	Sample size (Note: Key: A – all adults RV – registered voters LV – likely voters V – unclear)	Margin of error	Rocky De La Fuente	Donald Trump	Bill Weld	Other	Undecided
Emerson College	Mar 18–19	423 (LV)	–	–	94%	6%	–	–
	Mar 18	Weld withdraws from the race						
	Mar 17	Florida and Illinois primaries; Trump becomes presumptive nominee						
	Mar 11	COVID-19 declared a pandemic by the World Health Organization; national emergency declared Mar 13						
	Mar 10	Idaho, Michigan, Mississippi, Missouri and Washington primaries						
	Mar 3	Super Tuesday						
YouGov/Economist	Mar 1–3	232 (LV)	–	1%	94%	2%	0% (Note: Would not vote with 0%)	2%
YouGov/Economist	Feb 23–25	385 (LV)	–	1%	92%	2%	1% (Note: Would not vote with 1%)	3%
YouGov/Economist	Feb 17–18	358 (LV)	–	2%	91%	1%	0%	5%
Emerson College	Feb 16–18	482 (LV)	–	–	91%	9%	–	–
YouGov/Yahoo News	Feb 12–13	610 (LV)	– (Note: If Pence and Trump were the only candidates)	–	82%	–	13% (Note: Pence with 13%)	4%
	Feb 11	New Hampshire primary						
YouGov/Economist	Feb 9–11	349 (LV)	–	2%	90%	5%	1%	2%
	Feb 7	Walsh withdraws from the race						
McLaughlin & Associates	Feb 7–11	479 (LV)	–	–	87%	6%	0% (Note: Romney, Sanford and Walsh with 0%)	7%
YouGov/Economist	Feb 2–4	401 (LV)	–	0%	89%	1%	3% (Note: Would not vote with 1%; Walsh with 2%)	7%
	Feb 3	Iowa caucuses						

=== From December 2019 to January 2020 ===
Poll source	Date(s) administered	Sample size	Margin of error	Rocky De La Fuente	Donald Trump	Joe Walsh	Bill Weld	Other	Undecided
YouGov/Economist	Jan 26–28	384 (LV)	–	1%	89%	3%	2%	1%	4%
Emerson College	Jan 21–23	412 (LV)	–	–	92%	2%	6%	–	–
YouGov/Economist	Jan 19–21	459 (LV)	–	1%	89%	2%	2%	2% (Note: Would not vote with 2%)	4%
YouGov/Economist	Jan 11–14	362 (LV)	–	1%	88%	1%	1%	1%	9%
YouGov/The Economist	Jan 5–7	399 (LV)	–	1%	87%	1%	2%	1%	7%
YouGov/The Economist	Dec 28–31	359 (LV)	–	1%	89%	1%	2%	1%	6%
YouGov/Economist	Dec 22–24	415 (LV)	–	1%	91%	2%	1%	0%	5%
McLaughlin & Associates	Dec 14–18	399 (LV)	–	–	83%	2%	3%	0% (Note: No voters)	11%
Emerson College	Dec 15–17	492 (LV)	–	–	90%	5%	5%	–	–
YouGov/Economist	Dec 14–17	354 (LV)	–	1%	88%	2%	2%	0%	7%
Suffolk University	Dec 10–14	329 (LV)	–	–	88%	2%	2%	0% (Note: Refused with 0%)	7%
YouGov/Economist	Dec 7–10	422 (LV)	–	–	88%	2%	2%	1%	8%
YouGov/Economist	Dec 1–3	417 (LV)	–	–	89%	2%	3%	–	6%

=== June 2019 to November 2019 ===
Poll source	Date(s) administered	Sample size	Margin of error	Mark Sanford	Donald Trump	Joe Walsh	Bill Weld	Other	Undecided
YouGov/Economist	Nov 24–26	402 (LV)	–	–	89%	2%	3%	1%	6%
RealClear Opinion Research	Nov 15–21	780 (LV)	–	–	89%	6%	1%	–	11%
Emerson College	Nov 17–20	426 (LV)	–	–	93%	4%	3%	–	–
YouGov/Economist	Nov 17–19	383 (LV)	–	–	90%	2%	1%	–	7%
	Nov 12	Sanford withdraws from the race							
YouGov/Economist	Nov 10–12	352 (LV)	–	3%	89%	1%	1%	1%	5%
YouGov/Economist	Nov 3–5	402 (LV)	–	1%	87%	1%	3%	1%	8%
YouGov/Economist	Oct 27–29	464 (LV)	–	3%	83%	2%	2%	1%	9%
Suffolk University/USA Today	Oct 23–26	323 (LV)	± 5.5%	1%	85%	1%	2%	–	11%
YouGov/Economist	Oct 20–22	404 (LV)	–	3%	87%	1%	1%	1%	8%
McLaughlin and Associates	Oct 17–22	411	–	1%	76%	1%	2%	9% (Note: Romney with 9%)	12%
Emerson College	Oct 18–21	378	± 4.9%	3%	91%	2%	5%	–	–
Ipsos	Oct 17–18	507	± 5.7%	1%	79%	1%	1%	8% (Note: Kasich with 5%; can't/won't vote with 1%; other with 2%)	11%
YouGov/Economist	Oct 10–13	354	–	2%	86%	2%	3%	–	5%
YouGov/Economist	Oct 6–8	473	± 2.9%	1%	84%	3%	3%	–	8%
YouGov/Economist	Sep 28 – Oct 1	360	± 2.6%	3%	86%	2%	2%	–	7%
Quinnipiac University	Sep 19–23	568	± 4.9%	2%	80%	2%	2%	1%	12%
Emerson College	Sep 21–23	363	± 5.1%	3%	89%	5%	4%	–	–
Fox News	Sep 15–17	341	± 5.0%	2%	86%	2%	2%	1%	5%
YouGov/Economist	Sep 14–17	416	± 2.7%	2%	86%	1%	5%	1%	5%
Emerson College	Sep 13–16	208	± 3.3%	6%	86%	4%	4%	–	–
Public Religion Research Institute	Aug 22 – Sep 15	957	± 2.8%	–	74%	–	10%	13%	3% (Note: Includes "refused")
HarrisX	Sep 9–12	1,175	–	2%	76%	2%	2%	4%	14%
Democracy Corps	Sep 7–11	315	–	4%	85%	5%	2%	1%	4%
YouGov/Economist	Sep 8–10	393	± 2.7%	3%	82%	1%	4%	2%	7%
McLaughlin & Associates	Sep 7–10	416	–	3%	76%	1%	3%	–	17%
	Sep 8	Sanford announces his candidacy							
Emerson College	Aug 24–26	482	± 2.5%	–	84%	–	16%	–	–
HarrisX	Aug 23–26	1,194	–	–	76%	5%	3%	6%	10%
	Aug 25	Walsh announces his candidacy							
Suffolk University	Aug 20–25	289	–	–	90%	–	5%	–	5%
McLaughlin & Associates	Jul 23–28	415	± 4.0%	4%	81%	–	2%	–	14%
Democracy Corps	Jul 18–28	354	± 4.0%	4%	89%	–	4%	–	3%
Emerson College	Jun 21–24	407	± 4.9%	–	83%	–	17%	–	–
McLaughlin & Associates	Jun 18–24	417	-	–	79%	–	7%	–	13%
Suffolk University/USA Today	Jun 11–15	326	–	–	90%	–	5%	–	5%

=== November 2018 to May 2019 ===
Poll source	Date(s) administered	Sample size	Margin of error	Jeb Bush	Bob Corker	Ted Cruz	Jamie Dimon	Jeff Flake	Nikki Haley	Larry Hogan	John Kasich	Mike Pence	Mitt Romney	Paul Ryan	Ben Sasse	Donald Trump	Bill Weld	Other	Undecided
HarrisX	May 23–25	785	± 4.0%	–	–	–	–	–	–	–	–	–	–	–	–	73%	7%	5%	13%
Change Research	May 18–21	1,248	± 2.8%	–	2%	–	–	–	–	–	–	–	–	–	–	94%	–	–	4%
Change Research	May 18–21	1,248	± 2.8%	–	–	–	–	–	7%	–	–	–	–	–	–	87%	–	–	6%
Change Research	May 18–21	1,248	± 2.8%	–	–	–	–	–	–	–	3%	–	–	–	–	94%	–	–	3%
	May 16	De La Fuente announces his candidacy																	
Emerson College	May 10–13	384	± 5.0%	–	–	–	–	–	–	–	–	–	–	–	–	86%	14%	–	–
McLaughlin & Associates	May 7–11	330	–	–	–	–	–	–	–	1%	5%	–	–	–	–	77%	3%	–	14%
Zogby Analytics	May 2–9	463	–	–	–	–	–	–	–	–	–	–	–	–	–	81%	4%	10%	6%
Quinnipiac University	Apr 26–29	419	± 5.6%	–	–	–	–	–	–	3%	–	–	–	–	–	84%	3%	1%	8%
HarrisX	Apr 26–28	641	± 4.0%	–	–	–	–	–	–	–	–	–	–	–	–	75%	7%	4%	11%
Morning Consult	Apr 19–21	641	± 4.0%	–	–	–	–	–	–	–	–	–	–	–	–	78%	7%	–	15%
Ipsos/Reuters	Apr 18–19	344	± 5.9%	–	–	–	1%	1%	5%	–	4%	10%	–	–	–	60%	–	2%	16%
	Apr 15	Weld announces his candidacy (exploratory committee on Feb 15, 2019)																	
Emerson College	Apr 11–14	324	± 5.4%	–	–	–	–	–	–	–	–	–	–	–	–	85%	15%	–	–
Ipsos/Reuters	Mar 25–26	362	± 5.9%	–	–	–	1%	0%	3%	–	5%	8%	–	–	–	63%	–	4%	16%
Morning Consult	Mar 22–24	638	± 4.0%	–	–	–	–	–	–	9%	–	–	–	–	–	73%	–	–	18%
Morning Consult	Mar 22–24	638	± 4.0%	–	–	–	–	–	–	–	13%	–	–	–	–	72%	–	–	16%
Morning Consult	Mar 22–24	638	± 4.0%	–	–	–	–	–	–	–	–	–	–	–	–	74%	8%	–	18%
McLaughlin & Associates	Mar 20–24	418	–	–	–	–	–	–	–	–	5%	–	–	–	–	80%	1%	–	14%
Emerson College	Mar 17–18	483	–	–	–	–	–	–	–	–	–	–	–	–	–	90%	10%	–	–
Ipsos/Reuters	Mar 5–11	756	± 4.1%	–	1%	–	0%	0%	3%	–	3%	–	9%	–	0%	69%	–	2%	13%
Monmouth University	Mar 1–4	339	± 5.3%	–	–	–	–	–	–	6%	–	–	–	–	–	75%	–	–	16%
Monmouth University	Mar 1–4	339	± 5.3%	–	–	–	–	–	–	–	–	–	–	–	–	74%	8%	–	18%
Ipsos/Reuters	Feb 26 – Mar 4	1,086	± 3.4%	–	1%	–	0%	1%	5%	–	3%	–	9%	–	1%	66%	–	3%	13%
Ipsos/Reuters	Feb 19–25	1,138	± 3.3%	–	0%	–	1%	1%	4%	–	4%	–	8%	–	1%	65%	–	3%	14%
Ipsos/Reuters	Feb 12–18	1,040	± 3.5%	–	0%	–	1%	1%	3%	–	4%	–	8%	–	1%	69%	–	2%	12%
Emerson College	Feb 14–16	366	± 5.1%	–	–	–	–	–	–	–	–	–	–	–	–	85%	15%	–	–
FOX News	Feb 10–12	432 (A)	±4.5%	–	–	–	–	–	–	–	–	–	–	–	–	72%	–	17%	11%
McLaughlin & Associates	Feb 6–10	413	–	–	–	–	–	–	–	–	6%	–	10%	–	–	72%	–	–	11%
Monmouth University	Jan 25–27	335	± 5.4%	–	–	21%	–	–	–	–	–	–	–	–	–	66%	–	–	9%
Monmouth University	Jan 25–27	335	± 5.4%	–	–	–	–	–	–	–	14%	–	–	–	–	73%	–	–	11%
Zogby Analytics	Jan 18–20	307	± 5.6%	2%	–	–	–	1%	6%	–	8%	–	9%	–	–	64%	–	4%	6%
HarrisX	Jan 4–5	320	–	–	–	–	–	–	–	–	–	–	17%	–	–	70%	–	–	13%
	2019																		
McLaughlin & Associates	Dec 10–14	392	–	–	–	–	–	2%	–	–	5%	–	9%	–	–	72%	–	–	12%
Harvard-Harris	Nov 27–28	819	–	3%	–	5%	–	2%	2%	–	6%	–	6%	5%	1%	44%	–	2%	16%
HarrisX	Nov 16–17	320	–	–	–	17%	–	–	–	–	–	–	–	–	–	66%	–	–	17%
HarrisX	Nov 16–17	320	–	–	–	–	–	9%	–	–	–	–	–	–	–	70%	–	–	21%
HarrisX	Nov 16–17	320	–	–	–	–	–	–	13%	–	–	–	–	–	–	69%	–	–	18%
HarrisX	Nov 16–17	320	–	–	–	–	–	–	–	–	14%	–	–	–	–	67%	–	–	19%
HarrisX	Nov 16–17	320	–	–	–	–	–	–	–	–	–	–	19%	–	–	69%	–	–	12%
HarrisX	Nov 16–17	320	–	–	–	–	–	–	–	–	–	–	–	20%	–	65%	–	–	15%
HarrisX	Nov 16–17	320	–	–	–	–	–	–	–	–	–	–	–	–	8%	70%	–	–	21%

=== Before November 2018 ===
Poll source	Date(s) administered	Sample size	Margin of error	Bob Corker	Tom Cotton	Ted Cruz	Jeff Flake	Nikki Haley	John Kasich	Mike Pence	Mitt Romney	Marco Rubio	Ben Sasse	Donald Trump	Other	Undecided
Harvard-Harris	Jun 24–25	430	–	15%	–	–	–	–	–	–	–	–	–	85%	–	–
GQR Research	Jan 6–11	374	–	–	–	4%	1%	4%	3%	11%	5%	5%	–	62%	0%	5%
	2018															
Public Policy Polling	Dec 11–12	–	–	–	–	21%	–	–	–	–	–	–	–	64%	–	15%
Public Policy Polling	Dec 11–12	–	–	–	–	–	16%	–	–	–	–	–	–	74%	–	10%
Public Policy Polling	Dec 11–12	–	–	–	–	–	–	–	19%	–	–	–	–	70%	–	11%
Public Policy Polling	Dec 11–12	–	–	–	–	–	–	–	–	22%	–	–	–	62%	–	15%
Public Policy Polling	Oct 27–29	–	–	–	–	27%	–	–	–	–	–	–	–	57%	–	16%
Public Policy Polling	Oct 27–29	–	–	–	–	–	14%	–	–	–	–	–	–	70%	–	16%
Public Policy Polling	Oct 27–29	–	–	–	–	–	–	–	24%	–	–	–	–	66%	–	11%
Public Policy Polling	Oct 27–29	–	–	–	–	–	–	–	–	28%	–	–	–	53%	–	19%
Public Policy Polling	Sep 22–25	–	–	–	–	15%	–	–	–	–	–	–	–	68%	–	17%
Public Policy Polling	Sep 22–25	–	–	–	–	–	–	–	18%	–	–	–	–	68%	–	13%
Public Policy Polling	Sep 22–25	–	–	–	–	–	–	–	–	21%	–	–	–	59%	–	21%
Fabrizio Lee	Aug 2017	1,500	± 2.5%	–	1%	13%	–	–	10%	–	–	–	1%	54%	–	20%
Public Policy Polling	Aug 18–21	–	–	–	–	22%	–	–	–	–	–	–	–	62%	–	17%
Public Policy Polling	Aug 18–21	–	–	–	–	–	–	–	21%	–	–	–	–	68%	–	11%
Public Policy Polling	Aug 18–21	–	–	–	–	–	–	–	–	24%	–	–	–	52%	–	23%
Opinion Savvy	Aug 16–17	220	± 6.6%	–	–	8%	–	–	17%	–	–	–	–	68%	–	7%
Opinion Savvy	Aug 16–17	221	± 6.6%	–	–	12%	–	–	15%	65%	–	–	–	–	–	8%
Marist College	Aug 8–12	361	± 5.2%	–	–	–	–	–	23%	–	–	–	–	64%	–	10%
Marist College	Aug 8–12	361	± 5.2%	–	–	–	–	–	–	33%	–	–	–	56%	–	8%

=== Against unnamed primary challenger ===
Poll source	Date(s) administered	Sample size	Margin of error	Donald Trump	Other	Undecided
Rasmussen Reports	May 10–11, 2020	< 1000 (LV) (Note: "Likely Republican" sample not yet released)	–	70%	23% (Note: "Someone else" with 23%)	7%
Morning Consult/Politico	Feb 28 - Mar 1 2020	718 (LV)	–	91%	7%	2%
Morning Consult/Politico	Jan 4–5, 2020	700 (RV)	–	87%	10%	3%
ABC News/Washington Post	Oct 27–30	388 (A)	±6%	67%	30%	3%
FOX News	Oct 27–30	388 (A)	±6%	78%	15%	7%
FOX News	Oct 6–8	367-376(LV)	±6%	77%	17%	6%
Morning Consult	Jun 29 – Jul 1	483	± 4.0%	83%	15%	3%
Morning Consult	Jun 29 – Jul 1	541	± 4.0%	83%	15%	2%
Morning Consult	Jun 21–24	698	± 4.0%	87%	12%	1%
Morning Consult	Jun 20–23	639	± 4.0%	87%	10%	3%
Morning Consult	Jun 14–16	693	± 4.0%	86%	13%	2%
Morning Consult	Jun 7–9	659	± 4.0%	84%	13%	3%
Morning Consult	May 31 – Jun 2	672	± 4.0%	83%	14%	3%
Change Research	May 18–21	1,248	± 2.8%	95%	4%	–
Morning Consult	May 10–12	695	± 4.0%	84%	15%	3%
Morning Consult	May 3–6	680	± 4.0%	85%	13%	2%
Morning Consult	Apr 28–29	692	± 4.0%	84%	13%	2%
Morning Consult	Apr 19–21	641	± 4.0%	79%	18%	4%
Morning Consult	Apr 12–14	367	–	83%	15%	2%
Morning Consult	Apr 12–14	358	–	82%	15%	3%
Morning Consult	Apr 1–7	11,986	± 1.0%	76%	20%	–
Morning Consult	Mar 25–31	11,549	± 1.0%	78%	20%	–
Morning Consult	Mar 18–24	12,090	± 1.0%	77%	19%	–
Morning Consult	Mar 11–17	11,542	± 1.0%	78%	20%	–
Morning Consult	Mar 4–10	13,682	± 1.0%	77%	20%	–
Morning Consult	Feb 25 – Mar 3	11,154	± 1.0%	77%	20%	–
Morning Consult	Feb 18–24	13,782	± 1.0%	77%	20%	–
Morning Consult	Feb 11–17	13,974	± 1.0%	77%	21%	–
Morning Consult	Feb 4–10	10,685	± 1.0%	77%	20%	–
	2019					
Public Religion Research Institute	Sep 17 – Oct 1	927	–	66%	33%	1%
Saint Leo University	May 25–31	–	–	63%	24%	13%
USC Dornsife/LAT	Dec 15 – Jan 15	1,530	± 3.0%	75%	25%	–
Emerson College	Jan 8–11	198	–	68%	18%	14%
	2018					
Public Policy Polling	Dec 11–12	–	–	70%	24%	6%
Public Religion Research Institute	Oct 18–30	846	–	59%	34%	7%
Public Policy Polling	Oct 27–29	–	–	57%	36%	8%
Public Policy Polling	Sep 22–25	–	–	61%	27%	12%
Public Policy Polling	Aug 18–21	–	–	57%	29%	13%

== Statewide polling ==
The statewide polls are ordered by the scheduled date of the state's primary or caucus. Polls with a sample size of <100 have their 'sample size' cells marked in red to indicate a lack of reliability.

=== Iowa caucus ===
The Iowa Republican caucus took place on Monday, February 3, 2020.

Poll source	Date(s) administered	Sample size	Margin of error	Michael Bloomberg	John Kasich	Donald Trump	Joe Walsh	Bill Weld	Other	Undecided
Iowa caucuses (first alignment vote)	Feb 3, 2020	–	–	–	–	97.1%	1.1%	1.3%	0.5%	–
Emerson College	Oct 13–16, 2019	286	–	–	–	93%	2%	4%	1% (Note: Sanford with 1%)	–
	Aug 25	Walsh announces his candidacy								
	Apr 15	Weld announces his candidacy (exploratory committee on Feb 15, 2019)								
Emerson College	Mar 21–24, 2019	207	± 6.9%	8%	–	93%	–	–	–	–
Emerson College	Mar 21–24, 2019	207	± 6.9%	–	–	90%	–	10%	–	–
Emerson College	Jan 30 – Feb 2, 2019	280	–	–	10%	90%	–	–	–	–

=== New Hampshire primary ===
The New Hampshire Republican primary took place on Tuesday, February 11, 2020.

Polling Aggregation
Source of poll aggregation	Date Updated	Dates polled	Donald Trump	Bill Weld	Joe Walsh	Undecided
270 to Win	Dec 11, 2019	Nov 26 - Dec 11, 2019	79.0%	11.0%	3.5%	6.5%

==== Since July 2019 ====
Poll source	Date(s) administered	Sample size	Margin of error	Rocky De La Fuente	Donald Trump	Joe Walsh	Bill Weld	Other	Undecided
New Hampshire primary (popular vote)	Feb 11, 2020	–	–	0.1%	84.4%	0.5%	9%	5.9% (Note: Buttigieg and Klobuchar with 0.7%; Maxwell with 0.6%; Bloomberg and Sanders with 0.5%; Romney with 0.4%; Merrill and Murphy with 0.3%; Matern with 0.2%; Ardini, Boddie, Comley, Kraft and Payne with 0.1%; Ely, Horn, Istvan and Locke with 0%; other write-in candidates with 1.1%)	–
Emerson College	Feb 8–9, 2020	500 (LV)	±4.3%	–	84%	–	16%	–	–
University of New Hampshire/CNN	Feb 6–9, 2020	212 (LV)	±6.7%	–	90%	No voters	7%	1% (Note: "Would support another candidate" with 1%)	1%
RKM Research and Communications Inc./Boston Herald/FPU/NBC10	Feb 5–8, 2020	440 (LV)	±4.7%	3%	71%	6%	8%	3%	11%
University of New Hampshire/CNN	Feb 5–8, 2020	227 (LV)	±6.5%	–	91%	No voters	5%	2% (Note: "Would support another candidate" with 2%)	2%
	Feb 7, 2020	Walsh withdraws from the race							
University of New Hampshire/CNN	Feb 4–7, 2020	203 (LV)	±6.9%	–	91%	No voters	5%	2%	3%
Marist College/NBC News	Feb 4–6, 2020	441 (LV)	±5.8%	–	88%	1%	7%	1%	2%
	Feb 3, 2020	Iowa caucuses							
RKM Research and Communications Inc./Boston Herald/FPU/NBC10	Jan 29-Feb 1, 2020	438 (LV)	± 4.7%	1%	72%	3%	7%	7%	10%
RKM Research & Communications Inc./Boston Herald/FPU/NBC10	Jan 23–26, 2020	407 (LV)	–	1%	72%	3%	7%	–	9%
Marist College/NBC News	Jan 20–23, 2020	450 (LV)	± 5.5%	–	87%	2%	8%	1%	2%
University of New Hampshire/CNN	Jan 16–23, 2020	394 (LV)	± 4.9%	–	90%	1%	4%	2% (Note: Listed as "Another candidate")	3%
RKM Research and Communications Inc./Boston Herald/FPU/NBC10	Jan 8–12, 2020	402 (LV)	–	2%	79%	4%	4%	3%	3%
MassINC Polling Group/WBUR	Dec 3–8, 2019	365 (LV)	± 5.1%	–	74%	4%	9%	9% (Note: Some other candidate with 4%; would not vote with 5%)	4%
Emerson College	Nov 22–26, 2019	440 (LV)	–	–	84%	3%	13%	0%	–
University of New Hampshire/CNN	Oct 21–27, 2019	461 (LV)	± 4.6%	–	86%	1%	5%	4% (Note: Sanford with 1%; other with 3%)	4%
RKM Research and Communications Inc./Boston Herald/FPU	Oct 9–13, 2019	405	± 4.9%	–	71%	5%	14%	3% (Note: Sanford with 1%; other with 2%)	7%
RKM Research and Communications Inc./Franklin Pierce University/Boston Herald	Sep 4–10, 2019	414	–	–	88%	1%	3%	1%	7%
Emerson College	Sep 6–9, 2019	379	–	–	80%	7%	13%	–	–
	Aug 25, 2019	Walsh announces his candidacy							
University of New Hampshire Survey Center/CNN	Jul 8–15, 2019	289 (LV)	± 5.8%	–	86%	–	7%	2%	5%
	May 16, 2019	De La Fuente announces his candidacy							
Monmouth University	May 2–7, 2019	427	± 4.8%	–	72%	–	12%	1%	2%

==== Before May 2019 ====
Poll source	Date(s) administered	Sample size	Margin of error	Tom Cotton	Ted Cruz	Jeff Flake	Larry Hogan	John Kasich	Mike Pence	Mitt Romney	Marco Rubio	Donald Trump	Joe Walsh	Bill Weld	Other	Undecided
Suffolk University	Apr 25–28, 2019	394	± 4.9%	–	–	–	0%	9%	–	–	–	70%	–	8%	–	12%
Suffolk University	Apr 25–28, 2019	394	± 4.9%	–	–	–	–	–	–	–	–	72%	–	17%	–	10%
University of New Hampshire	Apr 10–18, 2019	208	± 6.8%	–	–	–	1%	10%	–	–	–	76%	–	5%	–	8%
	Apr 15	Weld announces his candidacy (exploratory committee on Feb 15, 2019)														
University of New Hampshire	Feb 18–26, 2019	218	± 6.6%	–	–	–	–	17%	–	–	–	68%	–	3%	–	12%
Emerson College	Feb 21–22, 2019	328	± 5.4%	–	–	–	–	–	–	–	–	82%	–	18%	–	–
Praecones Analytica	Jan 16–21, 2019	330	–	–	–	–	–	–	–	24%	–	70%	–	–	–	6%
Suffolk University	Apr 26–30, 2018	315	± 5.5%	–	–	15%	–	–	–	–	–	72%	–	–	–	13%
Suffolk University	Apr 26–30, 2018	315	± 5.5%	–	–	–	–	23%	–	–	–	68%	–	–	–	8%
Suffolk University	Apr 26–30, 2018	315	± 5.5%	–	–	–	–	–	–	28%	–	63%	–	–	–	9%
Suffolk University	Apr 26–30, 2018	315	± 5.5%	–	–	–	–	–	–	–	23%	66%	–	–	–	11%
University of New Hampshire	Apr 13–22, 2018	202	± 6.8%	–	–	–	–	19%	–	–	–	67%	–	–	0%	14%
American Research Group	Mar 21–27, 2018	420	± 5.0%	–	–	4%	–	34%	–	–	–	51%	–	–	–	11%
American Research Group	Mar 21–27, 2018	420	± 5.0%	–	–	33%	–	–	–	–	–	49%	–	–	–	18%
American Research Group	Mar 21–27, 2018	420	± 5.0%	–	–	–	–	42%	–	–	–	48%	–	–	–	9%
American Research Group	Mar 21–27, 2018	420	± 5.0%	5%	7%	11%	–	36%	–	–	–	–	–	–	–	41%
American Research Group	Aug 4–6, 2017	600	± 4.0%	–	–	–	–	52%	–	–	–	40%	–	–	–	8%
American Research Group	Aug 4–6, 2017	600	± 4.0%	–	–	–	–	52%	27%	–	–	–	–	–	–	32%

Against unnamed primary challenger

Poll source	Date(s) administered	Sample size	Margin of error	Donald Trump	Other	Undecided
University of New Hampshire	Apr 10–18, 2019	208	± 6.8%	63%	14%	23%
University of New Hampshire	Feb 18–26, 2019	218	± 6.6%	56%	15%	29%
University of New Hampshire	Aug 2–19, 2018	199	± 6.9%	56%	20%	24%
University of New Hampshire	Apr 13–22, 2018	202	± 6.8%	55%	19%	27%
University of New Hampshire	Jan 28 – Feb 10, 2018	157	± 7.8%	60%	18%	23%
University of New Hampshire	Oct 3–15, 2017	191	± 7.1%	47%	23%	30%

=== Nevada caucus ===
The Nevada caucus was cancelled by the Nevada Republican Party in a vote on September 7, 2019.

Poll source	Date(s) administered	Sample size	Margin of error	Mark Sanford	Donald Trump	Joe Walsh	Bill Weld	Undecided
	Feb 7, 2020	Walsh withdraws from the race						
	Nov 12, 2019	Sanford withdraws from the race						
Emerson College	Oct 31–Nov 3, 2019	409 (LV)	–	2%	92%	3%	3%	–
	Sep 8, 2019	Sanford announces his candidacy						
	Sep 7, 2019	The Nevada Republican Party votes to cancel their caucus.						
	Aug 25, 2019	Walsh announces his candidacy						
	Apr 15, 2019	Weld announces his candidacy (exploratory committee on Feb 15, 2019)						
Emerson College	Mar 28–30, 2019	263	± 6.1%	–	92%	–	8%	–

=== South Carolina primary ===
The South Carolina primary was cancelled in a vote by the South Carolina Republican Party on September 7, 2019.

Poll source	Date(s) administered	Sample size	Margin of error	Bob Corker	Jeff Flake	Nikki Haley	John Kasich	Mark Sanford	Donald Trump	Bill Weld	Undecided
	Nov 12	Sanford withdraws from the race									
	Sep 8	Sanford announces his candidacy									
	Sep 7	The South Carolina Republican Party votes to cancel their primary.									
Change Research	Aug 9–12, 2019	568 (LV)	± 4.3%	–	–	14%	–	–	79%	–	–
Change Research	Aug 9–12, 2019	568 (LV)	± 4.3%	–	–	–	–	2%	95%	–	–
	Apr 15	Weld announces his candidacy (exploratory committee on Feb 15, 2019)									
Emerson College	Feb 28 – Mar 2, 2019	380	± 5.1%	–	–	–	–		90%	10%	–
Change Research	Feb 15–18, 2019	720	–	2%	–	–	–		91%	–	8%
Change Research	Feb 15–18, 2019	720	–	–	2%	–	–		93%	–	5%
Change Research	Feb 15–18, 2019	720	–	–	–	21%	–		67%	–	11%
Change Research	Feb 15–18, 2019	720	–	–	–	–	3%		91%	–	6%
Change Research	Feb 15–18, 2019	720	–	–	–	–	–		90%	3%	7%

Against unnamed primary challenger

Poll source	Date(s) administered	Sample size	Margin of error	Donald Trump	Other	Undecided
Change Research	Jun 11–14, 2019	1,183	± 2.9%	95%	5%	–

=== California primary ===
The California Republican primary took place on Tuesday, March 3, 2020.

Since June 2019

Poll source	Date(s) administered	Sample size	Margin of error	Mark Sanford	Donald Trump	Bill Weld	Joe Walsh	Other	Undecided
	Feb 7, 2020	Walsh withdraws from the race							
CNN/SSRS	Dec 4–8, 2019	298 (LV)	± 6.7%	–	85%	3%	3%	2% (Note: Someone else with 1%; "no one" with 1%)	8%
	Nov 12, 2019	Sanford withdraws from the race							
Emerson College	Sep 13–18, 2019	208 (LV)	–	6%	86%	4%	–	4%	-
	Sep 8, 2019	Sanford announces his candidacy							
	Aug 25, 2019	Walsh announces his candidacy							

April 2019 to May 2019

Poll source	Date(s) administered	Sample size	Margin of error	Nikki Haley	John Kasich	Donald Trump	Bill Weld	Undecided
Change Research	May 25–28, 2019	989	± 3.1%	5%	–	86%	–	8%
Change Research	May 25–28, 2019	989	± 3.1%	–	3%	90%	–	7%
Change Research	May 25–28, 2019	989	± 3.1%	–	–	91%	3%	6%
	Apr 15, 2019	Weld announces his candidacy (exploratory committee on Feb 15, 2019)						
Change Research	Apr 6–9, 2019	853	–	5%	–	83%	–	12%
Change Research	Apr 6–9, 2019	853	–	–	4%	83%	–	14%

Against unnamed primary challenger

Poll source	Date(s) administered	Sample size	Margin of error	Donald Trump	Other	Undecided
Change Research	May 25–28, 2019	989	± 3.1%	94%	7%	–
Change Research	Apr 6–9, 2019	853	–	88%	12%	–

=== Colorado primary ===
The Colorado Republican primary took place on Tuesday, March 3, 2020.

Poll source	Date(s) administered	Sample size	Margin of error	Donald Trump	Bill Weld	Undecided
Emerson College	Aug 16–19, 2019	339	± 5.3%	86%	14%	–
	Apr 15	Weld announces his candidacy (exploratory committee on Feb 15, 2019)				

Against unnamed primary challenger

Poll source	Date(s) administered	Sample size	Margin of error	Donald Trump	Other	Undecided
Magellan Strategies	Jan 30–31 and Feb 4, 2019	622	± 3.9%	78%	17%	5%

=== Massachusetts primary ===
The Massachusetts Republican primary took place on Tuesday, March 3, 2020.

Poll source	Date(s) administered	Sample size	Margin of error	Charlie Baker	Jeff Flake	John Kasich	Mike Pence	Mitt Romney	Paul Ryan	Donald Trump	Bill Weld	Other	Undecided
MassINC Polling Group/WBUR	Feb 23 - 26, 2020	374 (LV)	± 5.1%	–	–	–	–	–	–	83%	14%	2% (Note: "Some other candidate" with 2%; would not vote with no voters)	2% (Note: Listed as "Don't know/refused")
	Apr 15	Weld announces his candidacy (exploratory committee on Feb 15, 2019)											
Emerson College	Apr 4–7, 2019	183	± 7.2%	–	–	–	–	–	–	82%	18%	–	–
YouGov/UMass Amherst	Nov 7–14, 2018	227	–	30%	1%	3%	–	7%	2%	40%	–	–	16%
YouGov/UMass Amherst	Nov 7–14, 2018	225	–	33%	1%	7%	26%	8%	2%	–	–	–	22%

=== North Carolina primary ===
The North Carolina Republican primary took place on Tuesday, March 3, 2020.

Poll source	Date(s) administered	Sample size	Margin of error	Donald Trump	Joe Walsh	Bill Weld	Other	Undecided
High Point University	Feb 21 – 28, 2020	246 (LV)	–	91%	4%	3%	–	2% (Note: Listed as "no preference/cannot recall")
Marist College	Feb 23 – 27, 2020	410 (LV)	± 5.4%	93%	–	6%	<1%	1%
Meredith College	Feb 16 – 24, 2020	353 (LV)	–	85%	3.1%	2%	0.9% (Note: "No answer/refused" with 0.9%)	9.1% (Note: "Don't know" with 6.5%; "no preference" with 2.6%)
SurveyUSA	Feb 13 – 16, 2020	501 (LV)	± 3%	91%	–	5%	–	5%
	Feb 7, 2020	Walsh withdraws from the race						
High Point University	Jan 31 – Feb 6, 2020	198 (LV)	–	91%	4%	1%	–	4%
	Aug 25, 2019	Walsh announces his candidacy						
Emerson College	May 31 – Jun 3, 2019	336	–	88%	–	12%	–	–

=== Texas primary ===
The Texas Republican primary took place on Tuesday, March 3, 2020.

Polling Aggregation
Source of poll aggregation	Date Updated	Dates polled	Donald Trump	Mark Sanford	Joe Walsh	Bill Weld	Undecided
270 to Win	Nov 24, 2019	Nov 18, 2019	78.0%	4.0%	1.0%	1.0%	13.0%

Poll source	Date(s) administered	Sample size	Margin of error	Mark Sanford	Donald Trump	Joe Walsh	Bill Weld	Other	Undecided
Marist College	Feb 21 - 27, 2020	621 (LV)	±5.1%	–	94%	–	4%	<1%	2%
University of Texas at Tyler/DMN	Feb 17 - 26, 2020	567 (LV)	± 4.12%	–	86%	–	6%	–	8%
	Feb 7, 2020	Walsh withdraws from the race							
University of Texas at St Tyler/Dallas News	Jan 21–30, 2020	445 (LV)	± 4.65%	–	88%	4%	2%	–	6%
CNN/SSRS	Dec 4–8, 2019	537 (LV)	± 5%	–	86%	4%	3%	2%	4%
University of Texas at Tyler	Nov 5–14, 2019	597 (RV)	-	4%	78%	1%	1%	–	–
	Nov 12, 2019	Sanford withdraws from the race							
	Sep 8, 2019	Sanford announces his candidacy							
	Aug 25, 2019	Walsh announces his candidacy							
Emerson College	Aug 1–3, 2019	482	–	–	90%	–	10%	–	–
Emerson College	Apr 25–28, 2019	344	± 5.3%	–	87%	–	13%	–	–

=== Utah primary ===
The Utah Republican primary took place in Tuesday, March 3, 2020.

Against unnamed primary challenger

Poll source	Date(s) administered	Sample size	Margin of error	Donald Trump	Other	Undecided
Dan Jones & Associates/Salt Lake Chamber of Commerce	October 3–10, 2019	600 (LV)	± 4%	75%	22% (Note: Listed as "Time to give someone new a chance to serve" (as opposed to "should be re-elected"))	–
Dan Jones & Associates/Salt Lake Chamber of Commerce	June 11 – July 1, 2019	801 (LV)	–	70%	28%	–

=== Vermont primary ===
The Vermont Republican primary took place on Tuesday, March 3, 2020.

Poll source	Date(s) administered	Sample size	Margin of error	Rocky De La Fuente	Donald Trump	Bill Weld	Other	Undecided
Braun Research/VPR/VT PBS	Feb 4–10, 2020	166 (LV)	± 7.6%	1%	85%	6%	2% (Note: Other with 2%; "refused" with no voters)	7%

=== Wyoming caucuses ===
The last presidential cycle's Wyoming caucuses took place on March 1 in 2016 and would, if scheduled for Super Tuesday in 2020, take place on March 3, 2020. Instead, the Wyoming Republican state convention was scheduled for May 9, 2020.

Poll source	Date(s) administered	Sample size	Margin of error	Mark Sanford	Donald Trump	Joe Walsh	Bill Weld	Undecided
	Feb 7, 2020	Walsh withdraws from the race						
	Nov 12, 2019	Sanford withdraws from the race						
Montana State University Billings	Oct 7–16, 2019	67 (LV)	–	No voters	91%	<1%	<1%	8%

=== Michigan primary ===
The Michigan Republican primary took place on Tuesday, March 10, 2020.

Poll source	Date(s) administered	Sample size	Margin of error	Mark Sanford	Donald Trump	Joe Walsh	Bill Weld	Undecided
YouGov/University of Wisconsin-Madison	Feb 11 – 20, 2020	426 (LV)	–	–	97%	0%	1%	2%
	Feb 7, 2020	Walsh withdraws from the race						
	Nov 12, 2019	Sanford withdraws from the race						
Emerson College	Oct 31–Nov 3, 2019			2%	92%	3%	3%	-
	Sep 8, 2019	Sanford announces his candidacy						
	Aug 25, 2019	Walsh announces his candidacy						
	Apr 15, 2019	Weld announces his candidacy (exploratory committee on Feb 15, 2019)						
Emerson College	Mar 7–10, 2019	306	± 5.6%	-	89%	-	11%	–

=== Illinois primary ===
The Illinois Republican primary took place on Tuesday, March 17, 2020.

Poll source	Date(s) administered	Sample size	Margin of error	Donald Trump	Bill Weld	Other	Undecided
Southern Illinois University/Paul; Simon Public Policy Institute	Feb 10 - 17, 2020	232 (LV)	± 6.4%	89%	4%	2% (Note: "Someone else" with 2%)	5% (Note: Listed as "other/don't know")

=== Ohio primary ===
The Ohio Republican primary took place on Tuesday, March 10, 2020.

Poll source	Date(s) administered	Sample size	Margin of error	John Kasich	Mark Sanford	Donald Trump	Joe Walsh	Bill Weld	Undecided
	Feb 7, 2020	Walsh withdraws from the race							
	Nov 12, 2019	Sanford withdraws from the race							
Emerson College	Sep 29–Oct 2, 2019	325 (LV)		-	2%	87%	5%	5%	-
	Sep 8, 2019	Sanford announces his candidacy							
	Aug 25, 2019	Walsh announces his candidacy							
	Apr 15, 2019	Weld announces his candidacy (exploratory committee on Feb 15, 2019)							
Baldwin Wallace University	Feb 28 – Mar 9, 2018	261	± 6.0%	27%	-	62%	-	-	–

=== Florida primary ===
The Florida Republican primary took place on Tuesday, March 17, 2020.

Poll source	Date(s) administered	Sample size	Margin of error	Larry Hogan	John Kasich	Mark Sanford	Donald Trump	Marco Rubio	Joe Walsh	Bill Weld	Undecided
FAU-BEPI	Mar 5 – 7, 2020	409 (LV)	± 4.8%	–	–	–	92.6%	–	–	3.8%	3.5%
	Feb 7, 2020	Walsh withdraws from the race									
Florida Atlantic University	Jan 9 – 12, 2020	488 (LV)	± 4.4%	–	–	–	80%	–	14%	5%	–
	Nov 12, 2019	Sanford withdraws from the race									
Florida Atlantic University	Sep 12–15, 2019	355	± 5.2%	–	–	8%	85%	–	5%	2%	–
	Sep 8, 2019	Sanford announces his candidacy									
	Aug 25, 2019	Walsh announces his candidacy									
Florida Atlantic University	May 16–19, 2019	394	± 4.9%	0%	2%	–	85%	5%	–	1%	7%
	Apr 15, 2019	Weld announces his candidacy (exploratory committee on Feb 15, 2019)									

Against unnamed primary challenger

Poll source	Date(s) administered	Sample size	Margin of error	Donald Trump	Other	Undecided
Saint Leo University	May 25–31, 2018	–	–	68%	18%	13%

=== Wisconsin primary ===
The Wisconsin Republican primary took place on Tuesday, April 7, 2020.

Poll source	Date(s) administered	Sample size	Margin of error	Donald Trump	Bill Weld	Other	Undecided
YouGov/University of Wisconsin-Madison	Feb 11 – 20, 2020	348 (LV)	–	93%	0%	0% (Note: Walsh with 0%)	7%
	Apr 15	Weld announces his candidacy (exploratory committee on Feb 15, 2019)					
Emerson College	Mar 15–17, 2019	293	–	89%	11%	–	–

=== Arizona primary ===
The Arizona 2016 Republican primary was held on March 22, 2016, but the 2020 primary was cancelled on September 9, 2019.

Poll source	Date(s) administered	Sample size	Margin of error	Mark Sanford	Donald Trump	Joe Walsh	Bill Weld	Other	Undecided
	Feb 7, 2020	Walsh withdraws from the race							
	Nov 12, 2019	Sanford withdraws from the race							
Emerson College	Oct 25–28, 2019	367 (LV)	–	5%	88%	3%	4%	–	–
	Sep 9, 2019	The Arizona Republican Party votes to cancel their primary.							

=== Delaware primary ===
The Delaware Republican primary took place on Tuesday, April 28, 2020.

Poll source	Date(s) administered	Sample size	Margin of error	John Kasich	Donald Trump	Undecided
Gravis Marketing	Jul 24–29, 2018	288	± 5.8%	9%	67%	25%

=== Maryland primary ===
The Maryland Republican primary took place on Tuesday, April 28, 2020.

Poll source	Date(s) administered	Sample size	Margin of error	Larry Hogan	Donald Trump	Undecided
Gonzales Research	Apr 29 – May 4, 2019	203	± 7.0%	24%	68%	8%

=== Pennsylvania primary ===
The Pennsylvania Republican primary took place on Tuesday, April 28, 2020.

Poll source	Date(s) administered	Sample size	Margin of error	Donald Trump	Joe Walsh	Bill Weld	Undecided
	Mar 18, 2020	Weld withdraws from the race					
YouGov/University of Wisconsin-Madison	Feb 11 – 20, 2020	462 (LV)	–	87%	2%	2%	8%
	Feb 7, 2020	Walsh withdraws from the race					
	Aug 25, 2019	Walsh announces his candidacy					
	Apr 15	Weld announces his candidacy (exploratory committee on Feb 15, 2019)					
Emerson College	Mar 26–28, 2019	311	± 5.5%	90%	–	10%	–

=== Montana primary ===
Poll source	Date(s) administered	Sample size	Margin of error	Mark Sanford	Donald Trump	Joe Walsh	Bill Weld	Undecided
	Feb 7, 2020	Walsh withdraws from the race						
	Nov 12, 2019	Sanford withdraws from the race						
Montana State University Billings	Oct 7–16, 2019	99 (LV)	–	1%	88%	No voters	No voters	11%

=== New Jersey primary ===
Poll source	Date(s) administered	Sample size	Margin of error	Donald Trump	Joe Walsh	Bill Weld	Undecided
	Feb 7, 2020	Walsh withdraws from the race					
Emerson College	Jan 16–19, 2020	197 (LV)	± 6.9%	93%	4%	4%	–

=== New Mexico primary ===
Poll source	Date(s) administered	Sample size	Margin of error	Donald Trump	Joe Walsh	Bill Weld	Undecided
	Feb 7, 2020	Walsh withdraws from the race					
Emerson College	Jan 3–6, 2020	322 (LV)	–	87%	8%	5%	–

== See also ==
- 2020 Republican National Convention
- Nationwide opinion polling for the 2020 Democratic Party presidential primaries
- Statewide opinion polling for the 2020 Democratic Party presidential primaries
- Nationwide opinion polling for the 2020 United States presidential election
- Statewide opinion polling for the 2020 United States presidential election
