= Iowa caucuses, 2020 =

2020 Iowa caucuses may refer to:

- 2020 Iowa Democratic caucuses
- 2020 Iowa Republican caucuses
