= 2020 Colorado Republican presidential primary =

- March 3, 2020

37 Republican National Convention delegates

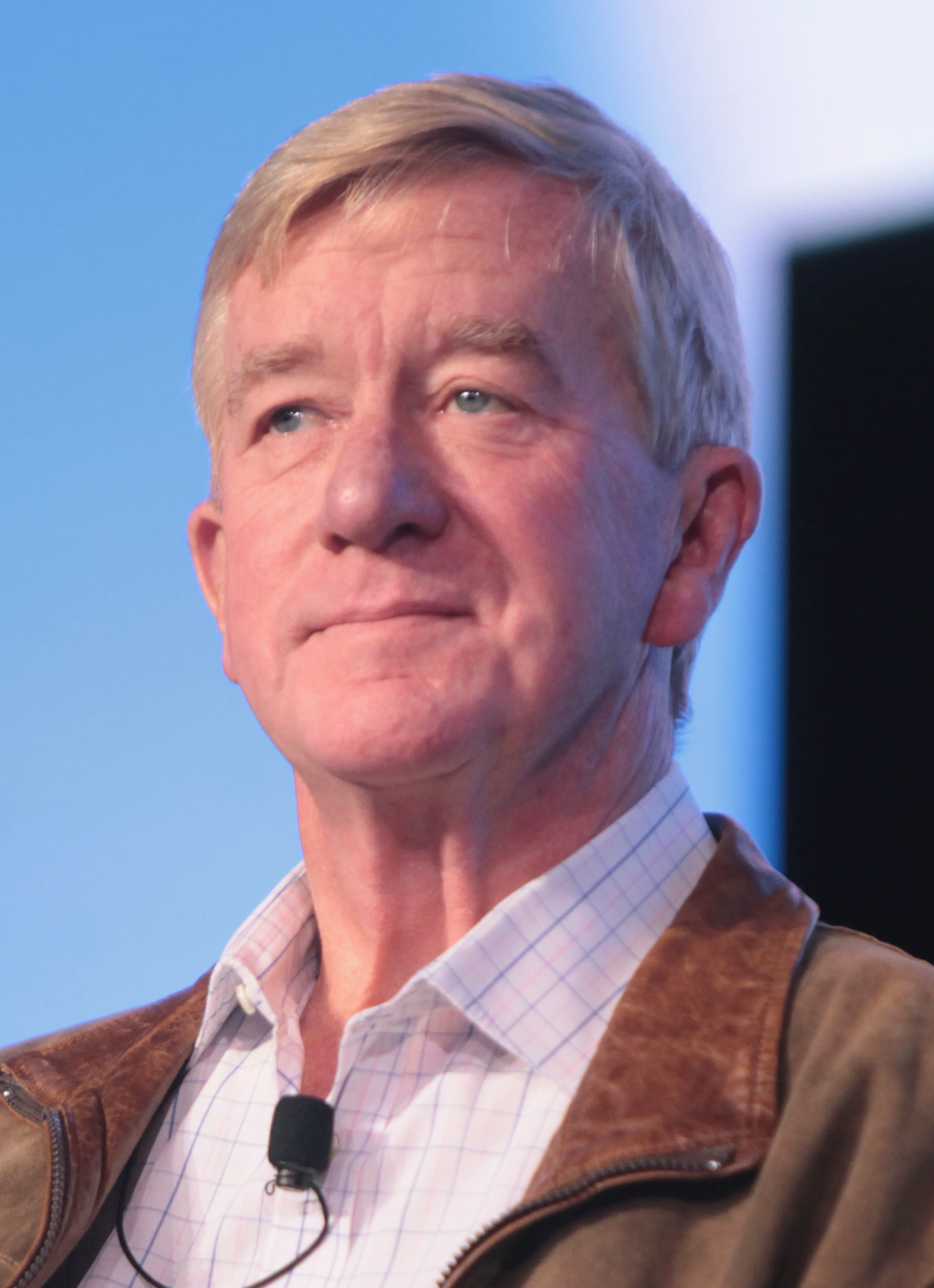
Candidate	Donald Trump	Bill Weld
Home state	Florida	Massachusetts
Delegate count	37	0
Popular vote	628,876	25,698
Percentage	92.26%	3.77%
- Results by county Trump Trump—≥95% Trump—90–95% Trump—85–90%

The 2020 Colorado Republican presidential primary took place in the US state of Colorado on March 3, 2020.

== Background ==
Various state Republican parties had cancelled their state primaries or caucuses, including Nevada, South Carolina and Kansas. This was going to be the case in Colorado, but advertising executive Robert Ardini filed on the first day permitted, triggering a law that states that the primary cannot be cancelled if more than one person has filed. Ardini was followed by perennial candidate Rocky de la Fuente, former governor Bill Weld, incumbent Donald Trump, Matthew John Matern, Joe Walsh, and Zoltan Istvan. De La Fuente, who was on the list when the ballot order was being decided, was not on the final ballot list, having withdrawn his name because of the state's "sore loser" law.

== Procedure ==
The primary was held by mail. Overseas and military voters were sent ballots on January 18, 2020, and in-state voters were sent them on February 10. The primary lasted until Super Tuesday (March 3) when all envelopes were opened and votes counted.

The state uses a "winner-take-most" system. If a candidate wins 50% or more of the vote, it's "winner-take-all". Otherwise, delegates are proportionally allocated to candidates who received 20% or more of the vote.

== Results ==
2020 Colorado Republican presidential primary
Candidate	Votes	%	Estimated delegates
Donald Trump (incumbent)	628,876	92.26	37
Bill Weld	25,698	3.77	0
Joe Walsh (withdrawn)	13,072	1.92	0
Matthew John Matern	7,239	1.06	0
Robert Ardini	3,388	0.50	0
Zoltan Istvan	3,350	0.49	0
Total	681,623	100%	37

=== Results by county ===
2020 Colorado Republican primary (results per county)
County	Donald Trump		Bill Weld		Joe Walsh		Matthew John Matern		Robert Ardini		Zoltan Istvan		Total votes cast
County	Votes	%	Votes	%	Votes	%	Votes	%	Votes	%	Votes	%	Total votes cast
Adams	39,107	93.04	1,235	2.94	814	1.94	488	1.16	209	0.50	181	0.43	42,034
Alamosa	1,780	93.44	47	2.47	42	2.20	24	1.26	10	0.52	2	0.10	1,905
Arapahoe	56,051	90.37	2,927	4.72	1,461	2.36	809	1.30	397	0.64	377	0.61	62,022
Archuleta	2,526	93.14	82	3.02	47	1.73	39	1.44	11	0.41	7	0.26	2,712
Baca	1,137	98.61	5	0.43	7	0.61	2	0.17	2	0.17	0	0.00	1,153
Bent	826	95.93	15	1.74	10	1.16	9	1.05	1	0.12	0	0.00	861
Boulder	18,551	86.21	1,647	7.65	618	2.87	333	1.55	186	0.86	183	0.85	21,518
Broomfield	7,371	89.62	439	5.34	200	2.43	123	1.50	51	0.62	41	0.50	8,225
Chaffee	3,364	92.54	123	3.38	69	1.90	45	1.24	20	0.55	14	0.39	3,635
Cheyenne	636	96.95	5	0.76	3	0.46	5	0.76	4	0.61	3	0.46	656
Clear Creek	1,229	90.84	63	4.66	32	2.37	15	1.11	8	0.59	6	0.44	1,353
Conejos	1,028	92.95	26	2.35	24	2.17	11	0.99	5	0.45	12	1.08	1,106
Costilla	225	92.59	7	2.88	4	1.65	4	1.65	0	0.00	3	1.23	243
Crowley	762	95.01	18	2.24	8	1.00	11	1.37	2	0.25	1	0.12	802
Custer	1,506	93.25	61	3.78	32	1.98	8	0.50	4	0.25	4	0.25	1,615
Delta	7,198	96.02	127	1.69	91	1.21	44	0.59	19	0.25	17	0.23	7,496
Denver	25,640	85.30	2,329	7.75	944	3.14	530	1.76	279	0.93	337	1.12	30,059
Dolores	638	98.00	3	0.46	5	0.77	4	0.61	1	0.15	0	0.00	651
Douglas	54,263	92.60	2,300	3.92	951	1.62	556	0.95	277	0.47	253	0.43	58,600
Eagle	3,687	90.08	224	5.47	112	2.74	32	0.78	12	0.29	26	0.64	4,093
El Paso	101,825	93.57	3,352	3.08	1,699	1.56	1,034	0.95	484	0.44	434	0.40	108,828
Elbert	7,424	95.95	140	1.81	80	1.03	43	0.56	26	0.34	24	0.31	7,737
Fremont	9,153	95.90	142	1.49	126	1.32	64	0.67	32	0.34	27	0.28	9,544
Garfield	6,827	93.69	207	2.84	128	1.76	61	0.84	30	0.41	34	0.47	7,287
Gilpin	742	93.22	27	3.39	12	1.51	5	0.63	6	0.75	4	0.50	796
Grand	2,464	90.62	121	4.45	72	2.65	30	1.10	16	0.59	16	0.59	2,719
Gunnison	1,666	91.39	80	4.39	45	2.47	19	1.04	5	0.27	8	0.44	1,823
Hinsdale	212	86.18	18	7.32	6	2.44	3	1.22	2	0.81	5	2.03	246
Huerfano	1,125	94.78	23	1.94	26	2.19	8	0.67	5	0.42	0	0.00	1,187
Jackson	454	93.61	11	2.27	13	2.68	5	1.03	1	0.21	1	0.21	485
Jefferson	69,850	90.45	3,612	4.68	1,835	2.38	963	1.25	468	0.61	494	0.64	77,222
Kiowa	514	96.44	8	1.50	6	1.13	4	0.75	0	0.00	1	0.19	533
Kit Carson	1,973	96.48	27	1.32	22	1.08	16	0.78	1	0.05	6	0.29	2,045
La Plata	6,608	92.57	260	3.64	147	2.06	65	0.91	21	0.29	37	0.52	7,138
Lake	472	91.65	20	3.88	14	2.72	4	0.78	3	0.58	2	0.39	515
Larimer	41,351	90.73	2,214	4.86	967	2.12	555	1.22	249	0.55	239	0.52	45,575
Las Animas	1,886	96.03	28	1.43	30	1.53	11	0.56	6	0.31	3	0.15	1,964
Lincoln	1,320	96.42	15	1.10	19	1.39	9	0.66	2	0.15	4	0.29	1,369
Logan	4,795	95.98	76	1.52	71	1.42	27	0.54	12	0.24	15	0.30	4,996
Mesa	27,382	94.58	673	2.32	432	1.49	239	0.83	113	0.39	113	0.39	28,952
Mineral	235	93.25	8	3.17	5	1.98	2	0.79	0	0.00	2	0.79	252
Moffat	2,997	96.12	39	1.25	35	1.12	26	0.83	11	0.35	10	0.32	3,118
Montezuma	5,034	94.98	109	2.06	77	1.45	46	0.87	11	0.21	23	0.43	5,300
Montrose	9,115	95.89	174	1.83	117	1.23	56	0.59	27	0.28	17	0.18	9,506
Morgan	4,754	95.58	84	1.69	82	1.65	28	0.56	15	0.30	11	0.22	4,974
Otero	3,105	94.49	56	1.70	64	1.95	39	1.19	12	0.37	10	0.30	3,286
Ouray	854	91.63	43	4.61	17	1.82	10	1.07	3	0.32	5	0.54	932
Park	3,493	93.92	110	2.96	57	1.53	27	0.73	12	0.32	20	0.54	3,719
Phillips	1,153	95.76	12	1.00	22	1.83	9	0.75	6	0.50	2	0.17	1,204
Pitkin	872	87.11	71	7.09	33	3.30	16	1.60	3	0.30	6	0.60	1,001
Prowers	2,355	96.75	20	0.82	29	1.19	15	0.62	7	0.29	8	0.33	2,434
Pueblo	18,358	94.66	384	1.98	344	1.77	158	0.81	76	0.39	73	0.38	19,393
Rio Blanco	1,986	96.69	34	1.66	18	0.88	9	0.44	4	0.19	3	0.15	2,054
Rio Grande	1,944	92.62	47	2.24	62	2.95	29	1.38	7	0.33	10	0.48	2,099
Routt	2,411	88.57	153	5.62	86	3.16	38	1.40	10	0.37	24	0.88	2,722
Saguache	656	94.93	13	1.88	15	2.17	6	0.87	0	0.00	1	0.14	691
San Juan	74	86.05	7	8.14	3	3.49	0	0.00	2	2.33	0	0.00	86
San Miguel	456	89.76	29	5.71	14	2.76	5	0.98	2	0.39	2	0.39	508
Sedgwick	678	94.04	16	2.22	15	2.08	9	1.25	1	0.14	2	0.28	721
Summit	1,915	86.77	145	6.57	98	4.44	21	0.95	11	0.50	17	0.77	2,207
Teller	5,813	95.40	161	2.64	60	0.98	37	0.61	9	0.15	13	0.21	6,093
Washington	1,641	96.19	29	1.70	20	1.17	6	0.35	6	0.35	4	0.23	1,706
Weld	41,037	94.42	1,193	2.75	550	1.27	366	0.84	166	0.38	148	0.34	43,460
Yuma	2,372	96.54	24	0.98	25	1.02	24	0.98	7	0.28	5	0.20	2,457
Total	628,876	92.26	25,698	3.77	13,072	1.92	7,239	1.06	3,388	0.50	3,350	0.49	681,623

== See also ==
- 2020 Colorado Democratic presidential primary
