= Bill Weld 2020 presidential campaign =

American political campaign

Weld 2020 Presidential Campaign Committee, Inc.
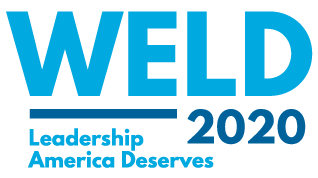
- Campaign: 2020 United States presidential election (Republican Party primaries)
- Candidate: Bill Weld; Governor of Massachusetts (1991–1997)
- Affiliation: Republican Party
- EC formed: February 15, 2019
- Announced: April 15, 2019
- Suspended: March 18, 2020
- Headquarters: Boston, Massachusetts
- Key people: Jennifer Horn (former campaign manager); Stuart Stevens (strategist)
- Receipts: US$1,740,043 (12/31/2019)
- Slogan: America Deserves Better

Website
- http://www.weld2020.org (archived - February 6, 2020)

On February 15, 2019, former Massachusetts Governor Bill Weld announced the formation of an exploratory committee to consider running for the Republican nomination in the 2020 United States presidential election. On April 15, 2019, Weld officially announced he would be running for president, challenging incumbent Donald Trump. Weld previously was the 2016 Vice Presidential nominee of the Libertarian Party on the Gary Johnson ticket. Weld suspended his campaign on March 18, 2020. He subsequently endorsed Democratic nominee Joe Biden for president.

== February 2019 launch ==
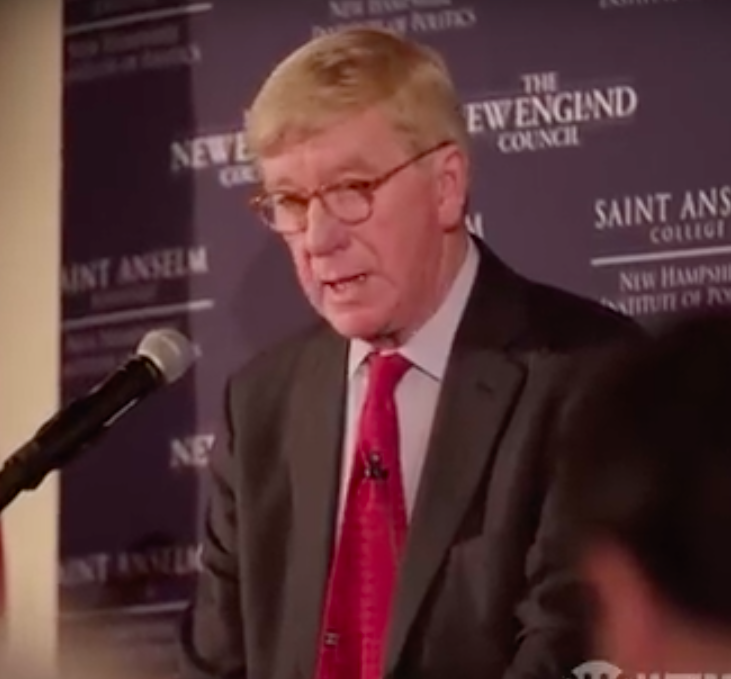
Weld announcing his formation of an exploratory committee

On February 15, 2019, Weld officially announced the formation of an exploratory committee in preparing to run for the 2020 Republican Party presidential primaries. He appeared on both Bloomberg News and MSNBC's Morning Joe the next day. On Morning Joe, he criticized Donald Trump as president, with a focus especially on what he labeled bad foreign policy in regards largely to North Korea and Russia.

On April 15, 2019, Weld officially announced his candidacy for the Republican nomination during an appearance on The Lead with Jake Tapper. Weld's campaign was managed by Jennifer Horn, the former chair of the New Hampshire Republican State Committee and also includes Stuart Stevens, a top strategist for Mitt Romney's 2012 presidential campaign. On March 18, 2020, Weld suspended his campaign.

== Political positions ==
=== Abortion ===
In May 2019, Weld described himself as "the most pro-choice person you’re ever going to meet." He said that recent abortion laws passed by states, such as Alabama's Human Life Protection Act, left him feeling "terrible". As governor of Massachusetts, Weld introduced a bill increasing ease of access to abortion in the state. In the 1990s, he publicly fought for removing anti-abortion language from the Republican Party platform, despite opposition from social conservatives.

=== Drugs ===
Weld believes that drug use should not be a criminal offense. Weld has also called for federal decriminalization of marijuana and the lowering of the drinking age.

=== LGBT rights ===
Weld has been a consistent supporter of LGBT rights, and the right to same-sex marriage.

=== Economy ===
Weld has described himself as fiscally conservative, with goals of reducing spending and balancing the budget. For this reason, he has been described as a "classic conservative". He has proposed to drastically reduce military spending, withdraw American forces from foreign engagements, and refocus American politics on domestic issues primarily.

=== Education ===
Weld has been a supporter of charter schools, having established the first twenty-five Massachusetts charter schools as governor.

=== Environment ===
Weld challenged Trump on the issue of climate disruption, saying that he had made no effort to combat the effects of global warming. "We've got the polar ice cap that's going to melt with devastating consequences if we don’t get carbon out of the atmosphere," Weld told "America's Newsroom," nothing that he would plan ahead for an "environmental catastrophe." Weld supported rejoining the 2015 Paris Agreement, making the United States carbon neutral by 2050, and a carbon fee and dividend program.

On September 20, 2019, Weld was the sole Republican at MSNBC’s Climate Forum, where he said he won’t take money from the oil and gas industry.

=== Impeachment ===
On October 26, 2019, it was reported that while speaking at Tufts University, Weld suggested that Trump might not even appear on the 2020 ballot. Weld noted that choosing a secret vote about impeachment is an option available to the Senate, and that former Senator Jeff Flake suggested that a secret vote in the process could shield senators effectively from adverse political reactions by the "Trump base", thereby freeing them to vote for conviction. Weld estimated that under those circumstances, 30 to 35 votes to convict would be attained easily and that only 20 were needed.

== 2020 campaign developments ==
=== February 2020 ===
- February 3: Weld wins 1.3% of the votes in the Iowa caucuses and one delegate to the Republican National Convention.
- February 11: Weld wins 9.1% of the votes in the New Hampshire primary.

=== March 2020 ===
- March 3: Weld wins 10.1% of the votes in the Vermont Primary, his best performance of any state.
- March 3: Weld wins 1.52% of the vote in Alabama Primary.
- March 18: Weld suspends his campaign.
