= 2020 Colorado Democratic presidential primary =

- March 3, 2020

79 delegates (67 pledged, 12 unpledged) to the Democratic National Convention The number of pledged delegates won is determined by the popular vote

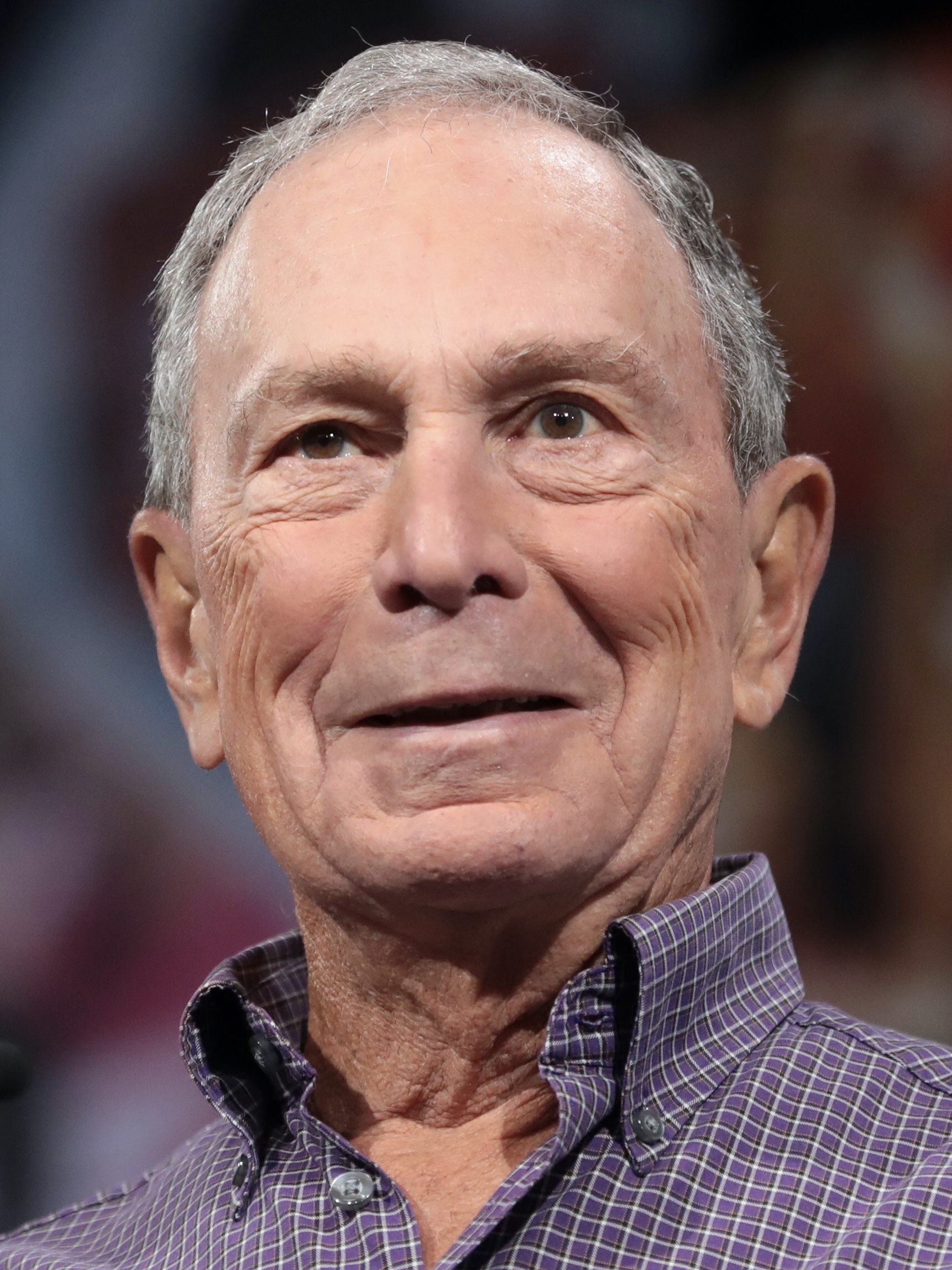

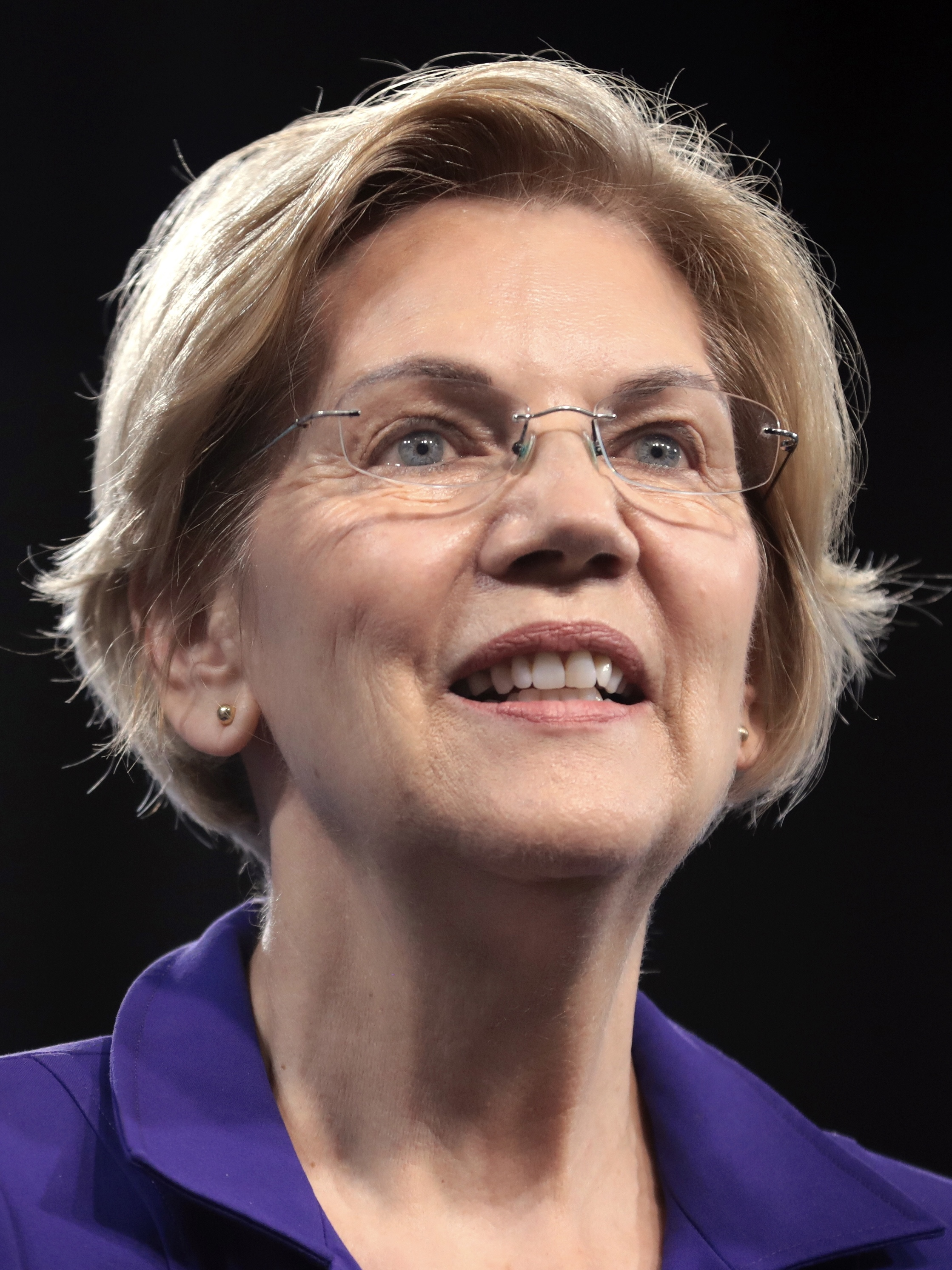
Candidate	Bernie Sanders	Joe Biden
Home state	Vermont	Delaware
Delegate count	29 (Note: 24 delegates, if Bloomberg's and Warren's statewide delegates would have been calculated.)	21 (Note: 17 delegates, if Bloomberg's and Warren's statewide delegates would have been calculated.)
Popular vote	355,293	236,565
Percentage	37.00%	24.64%
Candidate	Michael Bloomberg	Elizabeth Warren
Home state	New York	Massachusetts
Delegate count	9 (Note: 14 delegates, if Bloomberg's and Warren's statewide delegates would have been calculated.)	8 (Note: 12 delegates, if Bloomberg's and Warren's statewide delegates would have been calculated.)
Popular vote	177,727	168,695
Percentage	18.51%	17.57%

Sanders
<30%
30 – 40%
40 – 50%
50 – 60%
Biden
<30%
30 – 40%
Bloomberg
<30%
30 – 40%
Tie
Biden/Sanders
Results by first place popular vote winner
Joe Biden	Michael Bloomberg
Bernie Sanders

Pledged national convention delegates
Type	Del.
CD1	9
CD2	9
CD3	5
CD4	5
CD5	4
CD6	6
CD7	6
PLEO	9
At-large	14
Total pledged delegates	67

The 2020 Colorado Democratic presidential primary took place on March 3, 2020, as one of 15 contests scheduled on Super Tuesday in the Democratic Party primaries for the 2020 presidential election, following the South Carolina primary the weekend before. The Colorado primary, the first in the state since 2000, was a semi-closed primary and awarded 79 delegates towards the 2020 Democratic National Convention, of which 67 were pledged delegates allocated on the basis of the results of the primary.

Senator Bernie Sanders won the primary with 37% of the vote and ultimately received 29 delegates, ahead of former vice president Joe Biden, who won roughly 25% and received 21 delegates. Although former mayor Michael Bloomberg and senator Elizabeth Warren both surpassed the 15% threshold, following their withdrawal from the race in the next two days, the Colorado Democratic Party decided to directly calculate the delegate count without statewide delegates for Bloomberg and Warren, differing from the usual process in most states, where statewide delegates are calculated regularly and later reallocated to remaining candidates. Otherwise Bloomberg and Warren would have won 14 and 12 delegates instead of 9 and 8 delegates, while Sanders and Biden would have had only 24 and 17 delegates.

Sanders also benefited from that procedure after withdrawing in April: while his and Biden's campaign had agreed on Sanders keeping the statewide delegates he had won, the additional 5 statewide delegates he gained through Bloomberg's and Warren's withdrawal would all have been allocated to Biden as the presumptive nominee in accordance with the typical procedure and would have put Biden in front of Sanders with 26 to 24 delegates. Some media estimates, which did not notice the special approach of Colorado Democrats, reported these numbers as the final result.

== Procedure ==
Colorado was one of 14 states and one territory holding primaries on March 3, 2020, also known as "Super Tuesday", following the decision of governor Jared Polis to schedule the primary on that date on April 30, 2019. Instead of party-run caucuses Colorado used a state-run primary in 2020 after voters had passed Proposition 107 in 2016, restoring presidential primaries in the state, which had been held from 1992 to 2000 but were abolished in 2000 due to financial reasons, and matching a national trend for primaries.

Voting took place throughout the state until 7:00 p.m. In the semi-closed primary, candidates had to meet a threshold of 15 percent at the congressional district or statewide level in order to be considered viable. The 67 pledged delegates to the 2020 Democratic National Convention were allocated proportionally on the basis of the results of the primary. Of these, between 4 and 9 were allocated to each of the state's 7 congressional districts and another 9 were allocated to party leaders and elected officials (PLEO delegates), in addition to 14 at-large delegates. The Super Tuesday primary as part of Stage I on the primary timetable received no bonus delegates, in order to disperse the primaries between more different date clusters and keep too many states from hoarding on the first shared date or on a March date in general.

Precinct caucuses were held on March 7, 2020, to elect delegates to county conventions, followed by county conventions until April 1, 2020, to designate delegates for the district conventions and the state convention. The district conventions had to convene until April 17, 2020, to choose the district delegates for the national convention. On April 18, 2020, the state convention voted on the 14 at-large and 9 pledged PLEO delegates for the Democratic National Convention. The delegation also included 12 unpledged PLEO delegates: 5 members of the Democratic National Committee, 5 members of Congress (including senator and former candidate Michael Bennet and 4 representatives), the governor Jared Polis, and former DNC chair Roy Romer.

== Candidates ==
The following candidates were listed by the Colorado Secretary of State's office as certified on the ballot. Candidates that had filed a formal withdrawal with the office remained on the ballot but were not counted and did not appear in the results.

Running

- Joe Biden
- Michael Bloomberg
- Roque "Rocky" De La Fuente III
- Tulsi Gabbard
- Rita Krichevsky
- Bernie Sanders
- Elizabeth Warren
- Robby Wells

Withdrawn

- Cory Booker
- Deval Patrick
- Tom Steyer (Note: Candidate withdrew shortly before the primary and after the start of early in-person voting.)
- Marianne Williamson
- Andrew Yang

Formal withdrawal (ineligible)

- Michael Bennet
- Pete Buttigieg
- John Delaney
- Amy Klobuchar

== Polling ==
Polling Aggregation
Source of poll aggregation	Date updated	Dates polled	Bernie Sanders	Joe Biden	Elizabeth Warren	Michael Bloomberg	Tulsi Gabbard	Un- decided (Note: Calculated by taking the difference of 100% and all other candidates combined)
270 to Win	March 3, 2020	Feb 24–Mar 2, 2020	29.3%	16.3%	16.0%	15.3%	1.0%	22.1%
RealClear Politics	March 3, 2020	Insufficient recent polling to supply an average.						
FiveThirtyEight	March 3, 2020	until March 3, 2020 (Note: FiveThirtyEight aggregates polls with a trendline regression of polls rather than a strict average of recent polls.)	26.8%	18.2%	16.3%	15.8%	0.5%	22.4%
Average			28.0%	17.3%	16.2%	15.6%	0.8%	22.1%
Colorado primary results (March 3, 2020)			37.0%	24.6%	17.6%	18.5%	1.0%	1.3%

Tabulation of individual polls of the 2020 Colorado Democratic Primary
Poll source	Date(s) administered	Sample size (Note: Key: A – all adults RV – registered voters LV – likely voters V – unclear)	Margin of error	Michael Bennet	Joe Biden	Michael Bloomberg	Pete Buttigieg	Kamala Harris	John Hickenlooper	Bernie Sanders	Elizabeth Warren	Andrew Yang	Other	Undecided
	Mar 2, 2020	Klobuchar withdraws from the race												
Swayable	Mar 1–2, 2020	921 (LV)	± 4.0%	–	20%	19%	12%	–	–	29%	12%	–	7% (Note: Klobuchar with 4%; Gabbard and Steyer with 0%; "Other" with 3%)	–
Data for Progress	Feb 28–Mar 2, 2020	464 (LV)	± 4.2%	–	18%	16%	8%	–	–	32%	21%	–	5% (Note: Klobuchar with 3%; Gabbard with 2%)	–
	Mar 1, 2020	Buttigieg withdraws from the race												
Elucd	Feb 26–Mar 1, 2020	561 (LV)	± 4.1%	–	10%	9%	10%	–	–	34%	14%	–	9% (Note: Klobuchar with 5%; "Others" with 4%)	14%
Magellan Strategies	Feb 24–25, 2020	500 (LV)	± 4.38%	–	11%	11%	12%	–	–	27%	15%	–	9% (Note: Klobuchar with 6%; Gabbard and Steyer with 1%; "Other" with 1%)	15%
Data for Progress	Feb 23–25, 2020	471 (LV)	± 4.7%	–	10%	14%	14%	–	–	34%	20%	–	7% (Note: Klobuchar with 6%; Gabbard with 1%)	1%
	Feb 11, 2020	New Hampshire primary; Yang and Bennet withdraw from the race												
	Dec 3, 2019	Harris withdraws from the race												
Emerson College	Aug 16–19, 2019	403 (LV)	± 4.8%	1%	25%	–	5%	13%	–	26%	20%	4%	8% (Note: Booker with 2%; de Blasio, Gabbard, O'Rourke, Ryan, Williamson, and "Someone else" with 1%; Bullock, Castro, Delaney, Gillibrand, Inslee, Klobuchar, Messam, Moulton, Sestak and Steyer with 0%)	–
	Aug 15, 2019	Hickenlooper withdraws from the race												
Public Policy Polling	Jul 12–14, 2019	519 (LV)	–	5%	22%	–	7%	9%	7%	15%	19%	0%	14% (Note: O’Rourke with 1%; Booker, Castro, Inslee, de Blasio, Gabbard, Klobuchar, Ryan, Steyer, Williamson, Bullock, Delaney, Gillibrand, Gravel, Messam, Moulton, and Sestak with 0%)	–

== Results ==
Results by county Sanders—<30% Sanders—30–40% Sanders—40–50% Sanders—50–60% Biden—<30% Biden—30–40% Bloomberg—<30% Bloomberg—30–40%

The results were certified on March 30. The race was called for Bernie Sanders who won a plurality of votes and delegates.

2020 Colorado Democratic presidential primary
Candidate	Votes	%	Delegates
Bernie Sanders	355,293	37.00	29
Joe Biden	236,565	24.64	21
Michael Bloomberg	177,727	18.51	9
Elizabeth Warren	168,695	17.57	8
Tulsi Gabbard	10,037	1.05	
Andrew Yang (withdrawn)	3,988	0.42	
Tom Steyer (withdrawn)	3,323	0.35	
Cory Booker (withdrawn)	1,276	0.13	
Marianne Williamson (withdrawn)	1,086	0.11	
Deval Patrick (withdrawn)	227	0.02	
Other candidates	1,911	0.20	
Total	960,128	100%	67

=== Results by county ===
2020 Colorado Democratic primary (results per county) (Note: Michael Bennet, Pete Buttigieg, John Delaney and Amy Klobuchar officially withdrew. Thus all votes cast for them were not counted.)
County	Bernie Sanders		Joe Biden		Michael Bloomberg		Elizabeth Warren		Tulsi Gabbard		Andrew Yang		Tom Steyer		Cory Booker		Roque De La Fuente III		Marianne Williamson		Rita Krichevsky		Robby Wells		Deval Patrick		Total votes cast
County	Votes	%	Votes	%	Votes	%	Votes	%	Votes	%	Votes	%	Votes	%	Votes	%	Votes	%	Votes	%	Votes	%	Votes	%	Votes	%	Total votes cast
Adams	28,300	42.78	14,998	22.67	12,517	18.92	8,760	13.24	690	1.04	319	0.48	204	0.31	92	0.14	96	0.15	82	0.12	40	0.06	30	0.05	25	0.04	66,153
Alamosa	934	43.06	481	22.18	348	16.04	328	15.12	20	0.92	8	0.37	21	0.97	2	0.09	11	0.51	10	0.46	3	0.14	2	0.09	1	0.05	2,169
Arapahoe	37,902	35.98	27,219	25.84	21,591	20.50	16,412	15.58	1,008	0.96	425	0.40	324	0.31	157	0.15	96	0.09	116	0.11	41	0.04	28	0.03	24	0.02	105,343
Archuleta	662	35.04	465	24.62	373	19.75	333	17.63	23	1.22	2	0.11	14	0.74	4	0.21	2	0.11	7	0.37	4	0.21	0	0.00	0	0.00	1,889
Baca	60	25.10	71	29.71	43	17.99	31	12.97	13	5.44	2	0.84	3	1.26	7	2.93	2	0.84	1	0.42	3	1.26	1	0.42	2	0.84	239
Bent	154	34.22	108	24.00	128	28.44	36	8.00	4	0.89	3	0.67	9	2.00	1	0.22	2	0.44	3	0.67	1	0.22	1	0.22	0	0.00	450
Boulder	37,563	37.60	22,924	22.95	15,138	15.15	22,706	22.73	777	0.78	302	0.30	227	0.23	76	0.08	51	0.05	84	0.08	16	0.02	19	0.02	10	0.01	99,893
Broomfield	5,547	34.56	4,152	25.87	2,988	18.62	3,029	18.87	187	1.17	74	0.46	48	0.30	5	0.03	4	0.02	4	0.02	5	0.03	3	0.02	4	0.02	16,050
Chaffee	1,505	35.73	1,046	24.83	794	18.85	768	18.23	48	1.14	20	0.47	13	0.31	1	0.02	4	0.09	7	0.17	2	0.05	4	0.09	0	0.00	4,212
Cheyenne	17	20.48	22	26.51	28	33.73	8	9.64	2	2.41	1	1.20	3	3.61	0	0.00	0	0.00	1	1.20	0	0.00	1	1.20	0	0.00	83
Clear Creek	728	36.86	483	24.46	380	19.24	328	16.61	28	1.42	11	0.56	8	0.41	1	0.05	1	0.05	6	0.30	0	0.00	0	0.00	1	0.05	1,975
Conejos	482	37.51	388	30.19	278	21.63	81	6.30	18	1.40	12	0.93	10	0.78	2	0.16	5	0.39	3	0.23	4	0.31	2	0.16	0	0.00	1,285
Costilla	319	40.03	202	25.35	158	19.82	83	10.41	10	1.25	8	1.00	7	0.88	1	0.13	3	0.38	2	0.25	0	0.00	4	0.50	0	0.00	797
Crowley	71	26.01	81	29.67	78	28.57	29	10.62	6	2.20	1	0.37	3	1.10	1	0.37	2	0.73	0	0.00	0	0.00	1	0.37	0	0.00	273
Custer	136	25.61	154	29.00	111	20.90	110	20.72	9	1.69	2	0.38	4	0.75	2	0.38	1	0.19	1	0.19	0	0.00	1	0.19	0	0.00	531
Delta	1,362	39.49	783	22.70	651	18.88	525	15.22	48	1.39	13	0.38	28	0.81	8	0.23	2	0.06	19	0.55	5	0.14	4	0.12	1	0.03	3,449
Denver	69,727	38.86	40,881	22.78	29,216	16.28	37,176	20.72	1,027	0.57	536	0.30	351	0.20	206	0.11	101	0.06	114	0.06	41	0.02	21	0.01	26	0.01	179,423
Dolores	75	41.90	41	22.91	23	12.85	28	15.64	6	3.35	0	0.00	4	2.23	0	0.00	2	1.12	0	0.00	0	0.00	0	0.00	0	0.00	179
Douglas	14,109	28.97	14,725	30.24	11,313	23.23	7,388	15.17	620	1.27	215	0.44	144	0.30	53	0.11	52	0.11	45	0.09	18	0.04	10	0.02	9	0.02	48,701
Eagle	3,031	32.64	2,476	26.67	2,326	25.05	1,279	13.77	89	0.96	22	0.24	32	0.34	7	0.08	3	0.03	11	0.12	5	0.05	1	0.01	3	0.03	9,285
El Paso	28,259	36.50	20,476	26.44	13,891	17.94	12,292	15.87	1,201	1.55	503	0.65	361	0.47	146	0.19	106	0.14	100	0.13	42	0.05	28	0.04	27	0.03	77,432
Elbert	642	28.89	612	27.54	557	25.07	309	13.91	52	2.34	19	0.86	11	0.50	0	0.00	7	0.32	9	0.41	1	0.05	2	0.09	1	0.05	2,222
Fremont	1,207	29.87	1,070	26.48	1,032	25.54	555	13.73	65	1.61	24	0.59	38	0.94	13	0.32	10	0.25	7	0.17	8	0.20	9	0.22	3	0.07	4,041
Garfield	3,085	38.03	1,988	24.51	1,483	18.28	1,336	16.47	101	1.25	38	0.47	36	0.44	7	0.09	9	0.11	17	0.21	6	0.07	4	0.05	2	0.02	8,112
Gilpin	603	46.49	233	17.96	185	14.26	241	18.58	19	1.46	7	0.54	1	0.08	2	0.15	3	0.23	1	0.08	2	0.15	0	0.00	0	0.00	1,297
Grand	859	37.12	551	23.81	474	20.48	359	15.51	36	1.56	9	0.39	15	0.65	5	0.22	2	0.09	2	0.09	0	0.00	2	0.09	0	0.00	2,314
Gunnison	1,877	48.89	722	18.81	532	13.86	637	16.59	36	0.94	13	0.34	12	0.31	3	0.08	1	0.03	3	0.08	1	0.03	1	0.03	1	0.03	3,839
Hinsdale	36	33.03	25	22.94	26	23.85	19	17.43	1	0.92	0	0.00	2	1.83	0	0.00	0	0.00	0	0.00	0	0.00	0	0.00	0	0.00	109
Huerfano	484	35.85	311	23.04	294	21.78	190	14.07	28	2.07	6	0.44	10	0.74	7	0.52	11	0.81	2	0.15	2	0.15	3	0.22	2	0.15	1,350
Jackson	26	31.33	32	38.55	8	9.64	14	16.87	1	1.20	1	1.20	1	1.20	0	0.00	0	0.00	0	0.00	0	0.00	0	0.00	0	0.00	83
Jefferson	42,803	35.78	29,197	24.41	23,502	19.65	21,361	17.86	1,352	1.13	486	0.41	415	0.35	123	0.10	136	0.11	138	0.12	43	0.04	35	0.03	25	0.02	119,616
Kiowa	16	22.86	23	32.86	18	25.71	5	7.14	5	7.14	2	2.86	0	0.00	0	0.00	0	0.00	1	1.43	0	0.00	0	0.00	0	0.00	70
Kit Carson	109	29.70	95	25.89	107	29.16	36	9.81	6	1.63	4	1.09	2	0.54	0	0.00	3	0.82	0	0.00	1	0.27	3	0.82	1	0.27	367
La Plata	4,380	39.95	2,658	24.25	1,577	14.38	2,052	18.72	141	1.29	37	0.34	63	0.57	6	0.05	16	0.15	21	0.19	7	0.06	4	0.04	1	0.01	10,963
Lake	605	45.42	286	21.47	173	12.99	222	16.67	23	1.73	9	0.68	2	0.15	3	0.23	3	0.23	4	0.30	2	0.15	0	0.00	0	0.00	1,332
Larimer	26,661	39.34	15,667	23.11	10,341	15.26	13,648	20.14	742	1.09	257	0.38	214	0.32	68	0.10	56	0.08	68	0.10	25	0.04	24	0.04	8	0.01	67,779
Las Animas	696	31.15	647	28.96	539	24.13	232	10.38	59	2.64	5	0.22	11	0.49	10	0.45	18	0.81	5	0.22	8	0.36	2	0.09	2	0.09	2,234
Lincoln	82	31.42	60	22.99	50	19.16	48	18.39	8	3.07	4	1.53	5	1.92	1	0.38	1	0.38	0	0.00	0	0.00	2	0.77	0	0.00	261
Logan	388	30.24	325	25.33	342	26.66	155	12.08	23	1.79	11	0.86	13	1.01	9	0.70	10	0.78	3	0.23	2	0.16	1	0.08	1	0.08	1,283
Mesa	5,267	32.78	4,520	28.13	3,115	19.38	2,552	15.88	219	1.36	109	0.68	138	0.86	42	0.26	33	0.21	41	0.26	19	0.12	9	0.06	6	0.04	16,070
Mineral	60	30.30	48	24.24	36	18.18	44	22.22	3	1.52	0	0.00	4	2.02	0	0.00	2	1.01	0	0.00	0	0.00	0	0.00	1	0.51	198
Moffat	206	36.79	146	26.07	90	16.07	84	15.00	12	2.14	6	1.07	1	0.18	5	0.89	3	0.54	4	0.71	1	0.18	1	0.18	1	0.18	560
Montezuma	1,234	41.82	705	23.89	425	14.40	467	15.83	43	1.46	15	0.51	32	1.08	6	0.20	8	0.27	10	0.34	2	0.07	3	0.10	1	0.03	2,951
Montrose	1,209	30.45	1,169	29.44	875	22.03	556	14.00	70	1.76	18	0.45	39	0.98	10	0.25	9	0.23	4	0.10	2	0.05	8	0.20	2	0.05	3,971
Morgan	560	31.37	459	25.71	482	27.00	206	11.54	38	2.13	8	0.45	9	0.50	5	0.28	11	0.62	3	0.17	3	0.17	1	0.06	0	0.00	1,785
Otero	663	33.22	533	26.70	525	26.30	181	9.07	35	1.75	16	0.80	19	0.95	6	0.30	8	0.40	3	0.15	2	0.10	2	0.10	3	0.15	1,996
Ouray	513	37.55	355	25.99	199	14.57	260	19.03	19	1.39	3	0.22	10	0.73	3	0.22	1	0.07	2	0.15	0	0.00	0	0.00	1	0.07	1,366
Park	1,033	40.56	591	23.20	395	15.51	438	17.20	49	1.92	10	0.39	14	0.55	0	0.00	7	0.27	5	0.20	3	0.12	1	0.04	1	0.04	2,547
Phillips	74	27.51	74	27.51	74	27.51	28	10.41	5	1.86	2	0.74	3	1.12	2	0.74	3	1.12	2	0.74	2	0.74	0	0.00	0	0.00	269
Pitkin	1,480	29.99	1,330	26.95	1,457	29.52	605	12.26	29	0.59	15	0.30	12	0.24	3	0.06	2	0.04	2	0.04	0	0.00	0	0.00	0	0.00	4,935
Prowers	227	30.23	200	26.63	188	25.03	92	12.25	9	1.20	12	1.60	4	0.53	8	1.07	5	0.67	2	0.27	1	0.13	3	0.40	0	0.00	751
Pueblo	7,802	31.30	7,360	29.53	6,335	25.41	2,535	10.17	305	1.22	150	0.60	140	0.56	65	0.26	120	0.48	40	0.16	32	0.13	32	0.13	11	0.04	24,927
Rio Blanco	81	30.57	73	27.55	58	21.89	49	18.49	2	0.75	0	0.00	1	0.38	0	0.00	0	0.00	1	0.38	0	0.00	0	0.00	0	0.00	265
Rio Grande	479	37.22	291	22.61	319	24.79	161	12.51	7	0.54	4	0.31	5	0.39	9	0.70	7	0.54	3	0.23	0	0.00	0	0.00	2	0.16	1,287
Routt	1,842	33.27	1,486	26.84	1,215	21.94	883	15.95	54	0.98	13	0.23	23	0.42	7	0.13	3	0.05	5	0.09	3	0.05	1	0.02	2	0.04	5,537
Saguache	619	52.10	181	15.24	168	14.14	172	14.48	13	1.09	9	0.76	7	0.59	3	0.25	6	0.51	7	0.59	1	0.08	2	0.17	0	0.00	1,188
San Juan	86	43.00	34	17.00	31	15.50	38	19.00	4	2.00	2	1.00	1	0.50	2	1.00	2	1.00	0	0.00	0	0.00	0	0.00	0	0.00	200
San Miguel	1,039	45.79	462	20.36	356	15.69	362	15.95	25	1.10	8	0.35	7	0.31	1	0.04	4	0.18	1	0.04	1	0.04	1	0.04	2	0.09	2,269
Sedgwick	57	31.67	41	22.78	40	22.22	25	13.89	6	3.33	2	1.11	3	1.67	2	1.11	0	0.00	0	0.00	3	1.67	1	0.56	0	0.00	180
Summit	2,260	36.99	1,626	26.61	1,153	18.87	954	15.61	69	1.13	13	0.21	21	0.34	4	0.07	3	0.05	5	0.08	2	0.03	0	0.00	0	0.00	6,110
Teller	912	34.12	731	27.35	471	17.62	459	17.17	43	1.61	20	0.75	18	0.67	2	0.07	8	0.30	7	0.26	1	0.04	0	0.00	1	0.04	2,673
Washington	66	35.48	39	20.97	40	21.51	28	15.05	5	2.69	2	1.08	1	0.54	0	0.00	0	0.00	2	1.08	3	1.61	0	0.00	0	0.00	186
Weld	11,911	39.25	7,304	24.07	5,927	19.53	4,308	14.20	426	1.40	132	0.43	136	0.45	61	0.20	57	0.19	38	0.13	25	0.08	10	0.03	13	0.04	30,348
Yuma	111	23.32	129	27.10	140	29.41	59	12.39	15	3.15	8	1.68	6	1.26	1	0.21	2	0.42	2	0.42	1	0.21	2	0.42	0	0.00	476
Total	355,293	37.00	236,565	24.64	177,727	18.51	168,695	17.57	10,037	1.05	3,988	0.42	3,323	0.35	1,276	0.13	1,136	0.12	1,086	0.11	445	0.05	330	0.03	227	0.02	960,128
