= Joe Walsh 2020 presidential campaign =

American political campaign

Walsh For President
- Campaign: 2020 United States presidential election (Republican Party primaries)
- Candidate: Joe Walsh; U.S. representative from IL-08 (2011–2013)
- Affiliation: Republican Party
- Announced: August 25, 2019
- Suspended: February 7, 2020
- Key people: Lucy Caldwell (campaign manager)
- Receipts: US$480,115.17 (12/31/2019)
- Slogan: Be Brave

Website
- http://www.joewalsh.org (archived - January 10, 2020)

Former U.S. representative Joe Walsh's campaign for President of the United States in the 2020 election began on August 25, 2019, when he announced his candidacy during an interview on ABC's show This Week, concurrently with the release of a video and a tweet. Walsh was challenging incumbent Donald Trump for the Republican nomination, along with Bill Weld, former governor of Massachusetts. Walsh had been a strong supporter of Trump's during the 2016 election but had gradually become disenchanted with the President, describing him as "morally unfit". In view of Trump's high popularity among Republicans and Walsh's own history of controversial statements, Walsh was considered a long-shot candidate for the nomination. He announced the suspension of his campaign on February 7, 2020, after a poor showing in the Iowa caucuses.

== Background ==
=== Congressional tenure (2011–2013) ===
Joe Walsh was elected to the United States House of Representatives in the 2010 midterm elections, defeating three-term incumbent Melissa Bean by 291 votes in an upset election. Though he received little support from establishment Republicans and the Illinois Republican Party, Walsh enjoyed strong support from members of the Tea Party Movement which propelled him to victory. During his time in Congress, Walsh gained national notoriety for his criticism of President Barack Obama and the Obama Administration. His comments often made headlines for being sharp and occasionally racially motivated.

Walsh was defeated for reelection in 2012 by Tammy Duckworth. During that race, Walsh again made national headlines when he criticized Duckworth for discussing her military experience so much on the campaign trail. (Duckworth was seriously injured in a helicopter crash during the Iraq War, leading to a double leg amputation and loss of some sensation in her right hand, among other injuries.) Walsh stated, "Now I’m running against a woman who, my God, that's all she talks about. Our true heroes, the men and women who served us, it's the last thing in the world they talk about." Parallels were later drawn between Walsh's comments and Donald Trump's comments during his 2016 campaign in which Trump stated John McCain was not a "war hero" because "he was captured." Duckworth defeated Walsh 55% to 45%.

=== Radio show host and Trump supporter ===
Following his retirement from Congress, Walsh began hosting a conservative talk radio show, The Joe Walsh Show. Though initially only broadcast in the Chicago radio market, the show was eventually nationally syndicated by the Salem Radio Network. Walsh again made several controversial statements during his radio program. In August 2019, Walsh stated "I wouldn’t call myself a racist, but...I’ve said racist things on Twitter. There's no doubt about it. And an apology is not enough." After the 2016 shooting of Dallas police officers, Walsh's Twitter account was temporarily suspended after he made statements critical of Obama and the Black Lives Matter movement that were perceived as threatening.

During this period, Walsh became an outspoken supporter of then-presidential candidate Donald Trump. Walsh initially endorsed Kentucky Senator Rand Paul in the 2016 Republican primaries but supported Trump once he had secured the nomination. On October 24, 2016, Walsh wrote on Twitter, "On November 8th, I'm voting for Trump. On November 9th, if Trump loses, I'm grabbing my musket. You in?" Following Trump's Inauguration, Walsh criticized some of Trump's Cabinet selections for having ties to Goldman Sachs, although he remained supportive of the President.

=== Increasing critique of Trump and campaign speculation ===
Walsh publicly rescinded his support for Donald Trump in July 2018 after the Helsinki Summit between Trump and President of Russia Vladimir Putin. Walsh stated "I will never support Trump again," calling him "a danger to this country." Walsh was one of the few Republican supporters of the Special Counsel investigation conducted by Robert Mueller to determine the presence of Russian interference in the 2016 United States elections and possible collusion between the Trump campaign and Russian officials. Shortly before announcing his presidential campaign, Walsh stated in an interview with CNN's Brooke Baldwin "I don't know how anybody can read this report and think, 'This is behavior that we want in our president...'Criminal behavior, who knows? But, boy, dishonest, immoral, unethical? Heck yes it is. And I’ll tell you, Brooke, every Republican on Capitol Hill agrees with what I just said. They can’t say that publicly." Walsh had begun discussing the need for a conservative to challenge Trump in 2020 as early as December 2018 and began to discuss the potential for his own run early in the summer of 2019.

Following the Senate vote not to require witnesses at the impeachment trial of Donald Trump on January 31, Walsh said that the vote was "Absolutely cowardly", and "I’m a Republican running for president;... these Senate Republicans... deserve to pay a big price."

== Campaign ==
After months of speculation, Walsh officially announced he would challenge Donald Trump on August 25, 2019, via a post made on Twitter and a video released on his website, alongside an interview on ABC's This Week. Walsh commented his candidacy was more focused on Trump's character than it was on the issues, stating, "I'm running against Trump because he's morally unfit. Period. It's about Trump. It's not about the issues. It's about Trump." In another interview, Walsh referred to the election as a "referendum" on Trump. In an interview with MSNBC shortly after announcing his candidacy, Walsh said that, should he be unsuccessful against Trump, he could be persuaded to vote for the Democratic nominee in the general election. He added "I will never vote for Donald Trump again."

Due to President Trump's high approval ratings among Republican voters and Walsh's controversial past statements, he was considered a long-shot candidate for the presidency. Walsh began apologizing for his past controversial statements, including rescinding his remarks that Barack Obama is Muslim. Trump's approval rating among Republicans has remained above 80% since the end of 2017.

On August 26, 2019, a day after announcing his campaign for president, Walsh announced he had lost his national radio syndication contract with the Salem Radio Network. Walsh's show will still air on Chicago's WIND until his paperwork to run is officially filed, then will likely be suspended or discontinued. Walsh stated that without his radio show, he planned to campaign "full time".

On September 6, 2019, Walsh appeared on Real Time with Bill Maher where host Bill Maher condemned a report that Republican primaries and caucuses were being canceled in the states of South Carolina, Nevada, Arizona, and Kansas before remarking that Walsh would have lost anyway.

On November 8, 2019, Walsh said in an interview that he would be more "pro-Israel" than Trump and stated that he would push for a one-state solution from Jordan to the Mediterranean if elected president.

In an interview with CNN on February 7, 2020, Walsh announced he was suspending his campaign after receiving only 1.1% of the vote in the Iowa caucuses. Walsh called the Republican Party a "cult" and suggested that he would likely support the Democratic nominee in the general election, stating he would rather have a devout socialist win the election than Trump. According to Walsh, no one could beat Trump in a Republican primary, because Trump supporters had become "followers" who think that Trump "can do no wrong," after absorbing misinformation "from 'conservative' media." He added, "They don't know what the truth is and — more importantly — they don't care."
