= 2020 Iowa Republican presidential caucuses =

- February 3, 2020

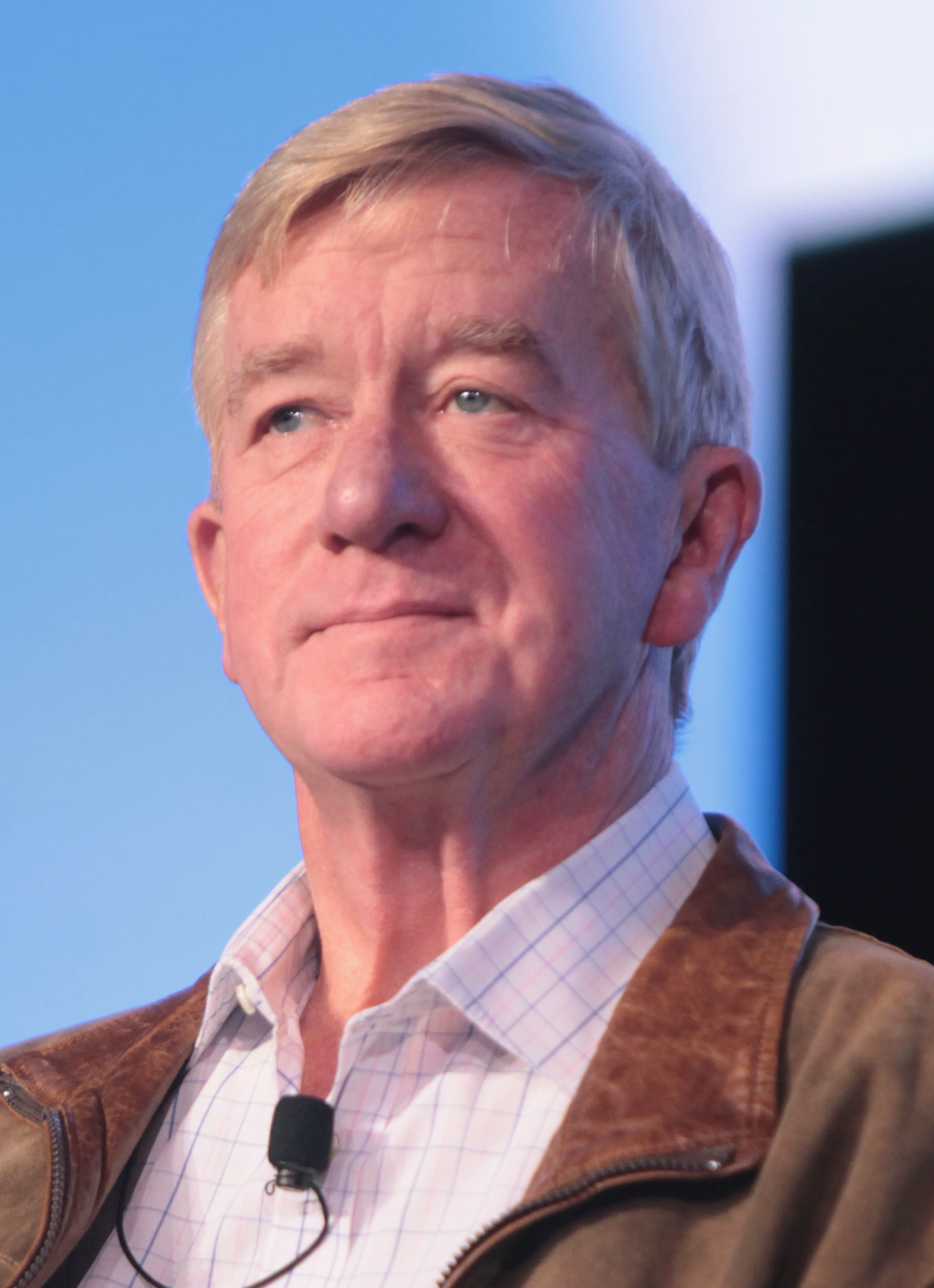
Candidate	Donald Trump	Bill Weld
Home state	Florida	Massachusetts
Delegate count	39	1
Popular vote	31,421	425
Percentage	97.1%	1.3%
- Donald Trump

The 2020 Iowa Republican presidential caucuses took place on Monday, February 3, 2020, as the first caucus or primary in the Republican Party presidential primaries for the 2020 presidential election. The Iowa caucuses are a closed caucus, with Iowa awarding 40 pledged delegates to the Republican National Convention, allocated on the basis of the results of the caucuses. Incumbent president Donald Trump received about 97 percent of the vote to clinch 39 delegates, while Bill Weld received enough votes to clinch 1 delegate.

== Procedure ==
Precinct caucuses were held on the evening of Monday, February 3, 2020, in order to directly allocate delegates to the Iowa Republican county conventions. Only registered Iowan Republicans were allowed to participate. These delegates were proportionally allocated to each candidate based on the statewide vote.

The county conventions were subsequently held on Saturday, March 14, 2020, to choose delegates for both the Republican Congressional District conventions and the Iowa Republican state convention. The congressional district conventions were then scheduled for Saturday, April 25, 2020, to elect Iowa's 12 district delegates to the Republican National Convention. The Iowa Republican state convention on Saturday, June 13, 2020, elected the rest of the state's delegates to the Republican National Convention.

== Campaign ==
A number of Republican candidates had campaign events in the state during 2019 and January 2020, including Weld and Walsh attending Democratic forums. Trump's campaign was active as well, having several surrogates attend events culminating in a rally in Des Moines attended by the president himself, on January 30. Among the cities that Bill Weld campaigned in was Sioux City, where he presented himself as an alternative to Trump on a variety of issues, ranging from economic conservatism to climate change.

The Trump campaign used the caucus as a "scrimmage" in order to test out get out the vote techniques and other improved methods and political marketing.

== Results ==
Counties won by these popular vote results
Map legend
- Trump—100%
- Trump—≥95%
- Trump—90–95%
- Trump—85–90%

Congressional districts won by these popular vote results
Map legend
- Trump—≥95%

2020 Iowa Republican presidential caucuses
Candidate	Votes	%	Estimated delegates
Donald Trump (incumbent)	31,421	97.14	39
Bill Weld	425	1.31	1
Joe Walsh	348	1.08	0
Other	151	0.47	0
Total	32,345	100%	40

== See also ==
- 2020 Iowa Democratic presidential caucuses
