= 2020 Republican Party presidential primaries =

- February 3 to August 11, 2020

2,550 delegate votes (2,443 pledged and 107 unpledged) to the Republican National Convention 1,276 delegates votes needed to win

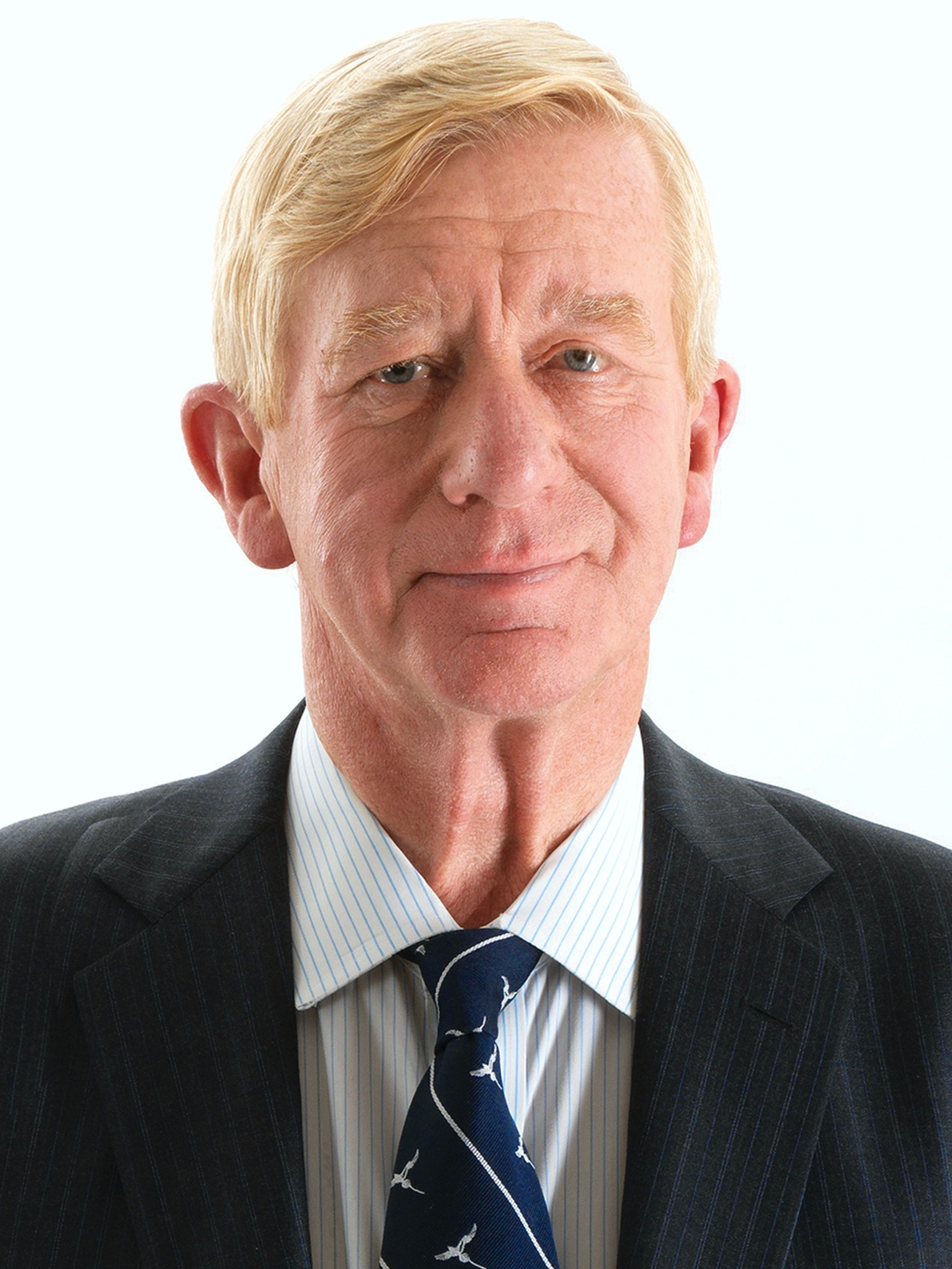
Candidate	Donald Trump	Bill Weld
Home state	Florida (Note: Trump's official state of residence was New York in the 2016 presidential election but later changed to Florida, when his permanent residence was switched from Trump Tower to Mar-a-Lago in 2019.)	Massachusetts
Delegate count	2,549	1
Contests won	56 (Note: Because Trump was the only candidate to declare for its ballot by the deadline, the Hawaii Republican Party automatically awarded its national pledged delegates to him on December 11, 2019.) (Note: Kansas' state committee, at the state convention, passed a resolution binding its delegates to Trump on February 1, 2020.)	0
Popular vote	18,159,752	454,402
Percentage	93.99%	2.35%
First place by first-instance vote
Donald Trump
Previous Republican nominee
Donald Trump
Republican nominee
Donald Trump

Presidential primaries and caucuses of the Republican Party took place in many U.S. states, the District of Columbia, and five U.S. territories from February 3 to August 11, 2020, to elect most of the 2,550 delegates to send to the Republican National Convention. Delegates to the national convention in other states were elected by the respective state party organizations. The delegates to the national convention voted on the first ballot to select Donald Trump as the Republican Party's nominee for president of the United States in the 2020 election, and selected Mike Pence as the vice-presidential nominee.

President Donald Trump informally launched his bid for reelection on February 18, 2017. He launched his reelection campaign earlier in his presidency than any of his predecessors did. He was followed by former governor of Massachusetts Bill Weld, who announced his campaign on April 15, 2019, and former Illinois congressman Joe Walsh, who declared his candidacy on August 25, 2019. Former governor of South Carolina and U.S. representative Mark Sanford launched a primary challenge on September 8, 2019. In addition, businessman Rocky De La Fuente entered the race on May 16, 2019, but was not widely recognized as a major candidate.

In February 2019, the Republican National Committee voted to provide undivided support to Trump. Several states canceled their primaries and caucuses. Other states were encouraged to use "winner-takes-all" or "winner-takes-most" systems to award delegates instead of using proportional allocation.

Trump became the presumptive Republican presidential nominee on March 17, 2020, after securing a majority of pledged delegates. Donald Trump received over 18 million votes in the Republican primary, the most ever for an incumbent president in a primary as well as the most for any Republican in a presidential primary.

== Primary race overview ==
Despite his generally high approval ratings and popularity by Republicans throughout his first presidency, numerous pundits, journalists and politicians speculated that President Donald Trump might face a significant Republican primary challenger in 2020 because of his historic unpopularity in polls, his association with allegations of Russian interference in the 2016 United States elections, his impeachment, and his support of unpopular policies. In August 2017, reports arose beginning that members of the Republican Party were preparing a "shadow campaign" against the president, particularly from the moderate or establishment wings of the party. Then-Arizona senator John McCain said, "Republicans see weakness in this president." Maine senator Susan Collins, Kentucky senator Rand Paul, and former New Jersey governor Chris Christie all expressed doubts in 2017 that Trump would be the 2020 nominee, with Collins stating "it's too difficult to say." Former U.S. senator Jeff Flake claimed in 2017 that Trump was "inviting" a primary challenger by the way he was governing. However, longtime political strategist Roger Stone predicted in May 2018 that Trump might not seek a second term were he to succeed in keeping all his campaign promises and "mak[ing] America great again".

Some prominent Trump critics within the GOP, including 2016 presidential candidate Carly Fiorina, former senator Jeff Flake, and former Massachusetts governor and current U.S. senator Mitt Romney stated they would not run against Trump for the nomination in 2020.

In 2017, there were rumors of a potential bipartisan ticket consisting of Republican Ohio governor and 2016 presidential candidate John Kasich and Democratic Colorado governor John Hickenlooper. Kasich and Hickenlooper denied those rumors. In November 2018, however, Kasich asserted that he was "very seriously" considering a White House bid in 2020. In August 2019, he indicated that he did not see a path to win over Trump in a Republican primary at that time, but that his opinion might change in the future.

On January 25, 2019, the Republican National Committee unofficially endorsed Trump.

After re-enrolling as a Republican in January 2019, former Republican governor of Massachusetts and 2016 Libertarian vice presidential nominee Bill Weld announced the formation of a 2020 presidential exploratory committee on February 15, 2019. Weld announced his 2020 presidential candidacy on April 15, 2019. Weld was considered a long-shot challenger because of Trump's popularity with Republicans; furthermore, Weld's views on abortion rights, gay marriage, marijuana legalization, and other issues conflict with socially conservative positions dominant in the modern Republican party. Weld received 1.3% of the vote in the Iowa caucuses and one pledged delegate to the 2020 Republican National Convention on February 3, 2020. Weld withdrew from the race on March 18, 2020, after Trump earned enough delegates to secure the nomination.

Former U.S. representative Joe Walsh was a strong Trump supporter in 2016, but gradually became critical of the president. On August 25, 2019, Walsh officially declared his candidacy against Trump, calling Trump an "unfit con man". He then ended his campaign on February 7, 2020, following a poor performance in the Iowa Caucuses. Walsh called the Republican Party a "cult" and said that he likely would support whoever was the Democratic nominee in the general election. According to Walsh, Trump supporters had become "followers" who think that Trump "can do no wrong", after absorbing misinformation from conservative media. He stated, "They don't know what the truth is and—more importantly—they don't care."

Former South Carolina governor and former U.S. representative Mark Sanford officially declared his candidacy on September 8, but suspended his campaign two months later on November 12, 2019, after failing to gain significant attention from voters.

Despite the mostly nominal status of his opposition, Trump campaigned during this primary season, holding rallies in the February primary and Super Tuesday states.

The president won every primary by wide margins and clinched the nomination shortly after the Super Tuesday primaries ended. While the results were never in doubt, the primary wasn't without controversy. Several states postponed their primaries/caucuses due to the COVID-19 pandemic, and others continued with in-person voting while Trump's false claims about fraud related to by-mail voting discouraged expansion and promotion of such voting.

== Candidates ==
=== Nominee ===
Republican nominee for the 2020 presidential election
Candidate	Born	Most recent position	Home state	Campaign Announcement date	Bound delegates	Popular vote	Contests won	Running mate	Ref.
Donald Trump	June 14, 1946 (age 74); Queens, New York	President of the United States (2017–2021)	Florida (Note: Trump's official state of residence was New York in the 2016 presidential election but later changed to Florida, when his permanent residence was switched from Trump Tower to Mar-a-Lago in 2019.)	Campaign June 18, 2019; FEC filing Secured nomination: March 17, 2020	2,549 (99.96%) (floor 2,550)	18,159,752 (93.99%)	56; AK, AL, AR, AS, AZ, CA, CO, CT, DC, DE, FL, GA, GU, HI, IA, ID, IL, IN, KS, KY, LA, MA, MD, ME, MI, MN, MO, MP, MS, MT, NC, ND, NE, NH, NJ, NM, NV, NY, OH, OK, OR, PA, PR, RI, SC, SD, TN, TX, UT, VA, VI, VT, WA, WI, WV, WY	Mike Pence	

=== Other candidates ===
The people in this section were considered to be major candidates
Candidate	Born	Most recent position	Home state	Campaign announced	Campaign suspended	Campaign	Delegates	Popular vote	Ref.
Bill Weld	July 31, 1945 (age 75); Smithtown, New York	Governor of Massachusetts (1991–1997)	Massachusetts	April 15, 2019	March 18, 2020 (endorsed Biden)	Campaign; FEC filing	1 (0.04%) (floor 0)	454,402 (2.35%)	
Rocky De La Fuente	October 10, 1954 (age 65); San Diego, California	Businessman and real estate developer	California	May 16, 2019	August 24, 2020 (ran as Alliance, Reform, and American Independent)	Campaign; FEC filing	0	108,357 (0.57%)	
Joe Walsh	December 27, 1961 (age 58); North Barrington, Illinois	U.S. Representative from IL-08 (2011–2013)	Illinois	August 25, 2019	February 7, 2020 (endorsed Biden)	Campaign; FEC filing	0	173,519 (0.92%)	
Mark Sanford	May 28, 1960 (age 60); Fort Lauderdale, Florida	U.S. Representative from SC-01 (1995–2001, 2013–2019)	South Carolina	September 8, 2019	November 12, 2019	Campaign; FEC filing	0	4,258 (0.02%)	

Other notable individuals who were not major candidates who suspended their campaigns:

- Bob Ely, investor
- Jack Fellure, presidential nominee of the Prohibition Party for the 2012 presidential election, retired engineer
- Augustus Sol Invictus, attorney, white nationalist, and far-right activist (endorsed Donald Trump)
- Zoltan Istvan, transhumanist activist

More than 150 individuals who were not major candidates also filed with the Federal Election Commission to run for president in the Republican Party primary.

=== Declined to be candidates ===
The individuals in this section had been the subject of the 2020 presidential speculation but publicly said they would not seek the presidency in 2020.

==== Endorsed Trump ====
- Greg Abbott, Governor of Texas
- Steve Bannon, former Trump campaign manager and White House Chief Strategist
- Chris Christie, former governor of New Jersey; 2016 presidential candidate
- Tom Cotton, U.S. senator from Arkansas (ran for re-election)
- Ted Cruz, U.S. senator from Texas; 2016 presidential candidate
- Nikki Haley, former ambassador to the United Nations; former governor of South Carolina
- Jon Huntsman Jr., Ambassador to Russia; former governor of Utah (ran for Governor)
- Rand Paul, U.S. senator from Kentucky; 2016 presidential candidate
- Mike Pence, Vice President of the United States; former governor of Indiana
- Marco Rubio, U.S. senator from Florida; 2016 presidential candidate
- Scott Walker, former governor of Wisconsin; 2016 presidential candidate

==== Others ====
- Charlie Baker, Governor of Massachusetts
- Jeb Bush, former governor of Florida; 2016 presidential candidate
- Ann Coulter, conservative columnist
- Mark Cuban, owner of Dallas Mavericks from Texas (endorsed Biden)
- Carly Fiorina, business executive and 2016 presidential candidate (endorsed Biden)
- Jeff Flake, former U.S. senator from Arizona; former U.S. representative (endorsed Biden)
- Larry Hogan, Governor of Maryland
- John Kasich, former governor of Ohio; former U.S. representative; candidate for President in 2000 and in 2016 (endorsed Biden)
- Jim Mattis, former secretary of defense
- Austin Petersen, 2016 Libertarian candidate for president
- Mitt Romney, U.S. senator from Utah; 2012 presidential nominee; former governor of Massachusetts
- Meg Whitman, business executive; nominee for governor of California in 2010 (endorsed Biden)

== Debates ==
The Republican National Committee (RNC) did not host any official primary debates. On May 3, 2018, the party voted to eliminate their debate committee, which, according to CNN, served as "a warning to would-be Republican rivals of President Donald Trump about his strong support among party loyalists". Trump declined any interest in participating in any primary debates, saying he was "not looking to give [opponents] any credibility". Debates among the challengers were scheduled without the RNC's involvement.

Business Insider hosted a debate on September 24 featuring two of Trump's primary challengers. It took place at the news outlet's headquarters in New York City, and was hosted by Business Insider's CEO Henry Blodget, politics editor Anthony Fisher, and columnist Linette Lopez. Walsh and Weld agreed to attend, but Sanford had a scheduling conflict and eventually declined. An invitation was also sent to the president, but he also declined.

Politicon held a debate between Sanford, Walsh, and Weld on October 26 at its 2019 convention in Nashville, Tennessee, and Forbes also held a debate between the three on October 28 at its Under 30 Summit in Detroit, Michigan.

Both Walsh and Weld took part in a few forums that also featured Democratic candidates.

== Cancellation of state caucuses or primaries ==
The Washington Examiner reported on December 19, 2018, that the South Carolina Republican Party had not ruled out forgoing a primary contest to protect Trump from any primary challengers. Party chairman Drew McKissick stated, "Considering the fact that the entire party supports the president, we'll end up doing what's in the president's best interest." On January 24, 2019, another Washington Examiner report indicated that the Kansas Republican Party was "likely" to scrap its presidential caucus to "save resources".

In August 2019, the Associated Press reported that the Nevada Republican Party was also contemplating canceling their caucuses, with the state party spokesman, Keith Schipper, saying it "isn't about any kind of conspiracy theory about protecting the president ... He's going to be the nominee ... This is about protecting resources to make sure that the president wins in Nevada and that Republicans up and down the ballot win in 2020."

On September 6, 2019, both of Trump's main challengers at the time, Bill Weld and Joe Walsh, criticized these cancellations as undemocratic. The Trump campaign and GOP officials cited the fact that Republicans canceled several state primaries when George H. W. Bush and George W. Bush sought a second term in 1992 and 2004, respectively; and Democrats scrapped some of their primaries when Bill Clinton and Barack Obama were seeking reelection in 1996 and 2012, respectively. Weld and Walsh were joined by Mark Sanford in a joint op-ed in The Washington Post on September 13, 2019, which criticized the party for cancelling those primaries.

Kansas, Nevada and South Carolina's state committees officially voted on September 7, 2019, to cancel their caucus and primary. The Arizona Republican Party indicated two days later that it would not hold a primary. These four were joined by the Alaska Republican Party on September 21, when its central committee announced they would not hold a presidential primary.

Virginia Republicans decided to allocate delegates at the state convention.

The Nevada Republican State committee chairman said the committee would meet on February 23, 2020, and bind their delegates to Trump.

The Hawaii GOP voted to cancel its primary and bind its 19 delegates to Trump on December 11, 2019.

The New York GOP on March 3, 2020, decided to cancel its primary after neither De La Fuente, Weld, nor Walsh submitted the required number of names of their delegates in order to qualify for their ballot. The delegate candidates bound to the president were thus automatically elected.

Other states were instead encouraged to use winner-takes-all systems to award delegates instead of using proportional allocation "to avoid dissent" at the convention.

== Timeline ==
=== Overview ===
Nominee	Exploratory committee	Withdrawn candidate	
Midterm elections	Iowa caucuses	Super Tuesday	Republican convention

=== 2017–18 ===
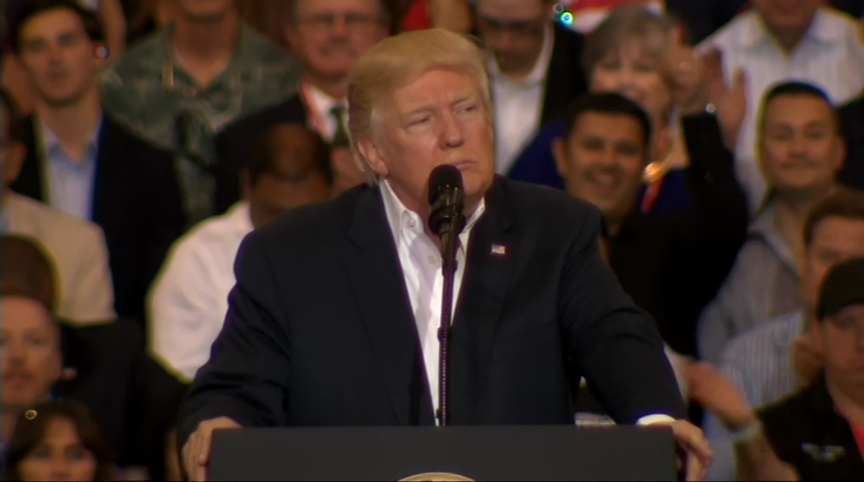
Incumbent President Donald Trump speaking at his first campaign rally in Melbourne, Florida, on February 18, 2017

- February 18, 2017: Donald Trump informally announces his candidacy for a second term and holds the first of a series of occasional reelection campaign rallies in Melbourne, Florida, only one month after assuming office.
- June 23, 2018: Trump delivers remarks at the Nevada Republican Convention in Las Vegas.
- July 18, 2018: Charlotte, North Carolina is chosen as the site for the 2020 Republican National Convention.
- November 7, 2018: Trump confirms that Mike Pence will remain his vice presidential pick.

=== 2019 ===
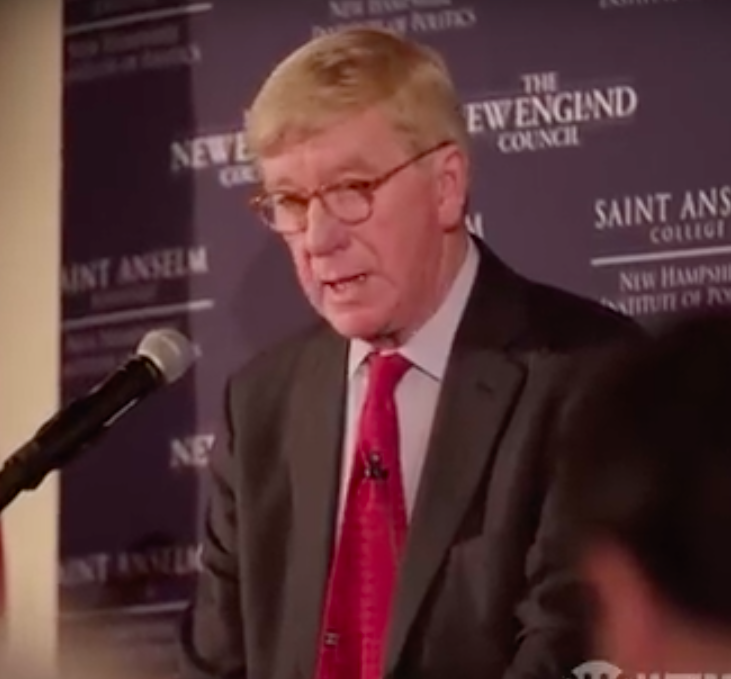
Former Gov. Bill Weld announcing the formation of his exploratory committee on February 15, 2019. He launched his campaign two months later.

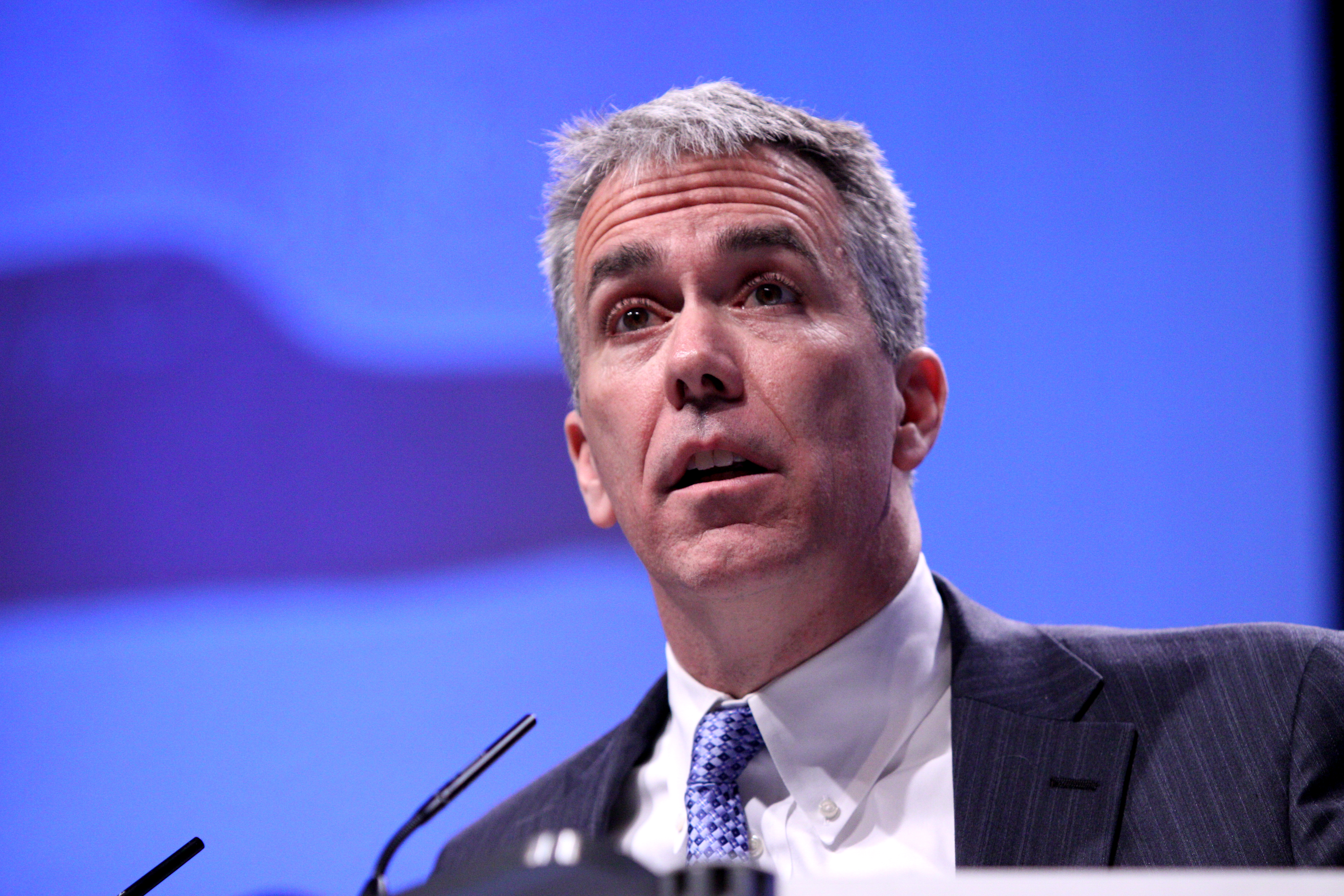
Former Rep. Joe Walsh announced his campaign on August 25, 2019. He withdrew after finishing Iowa with 1%.

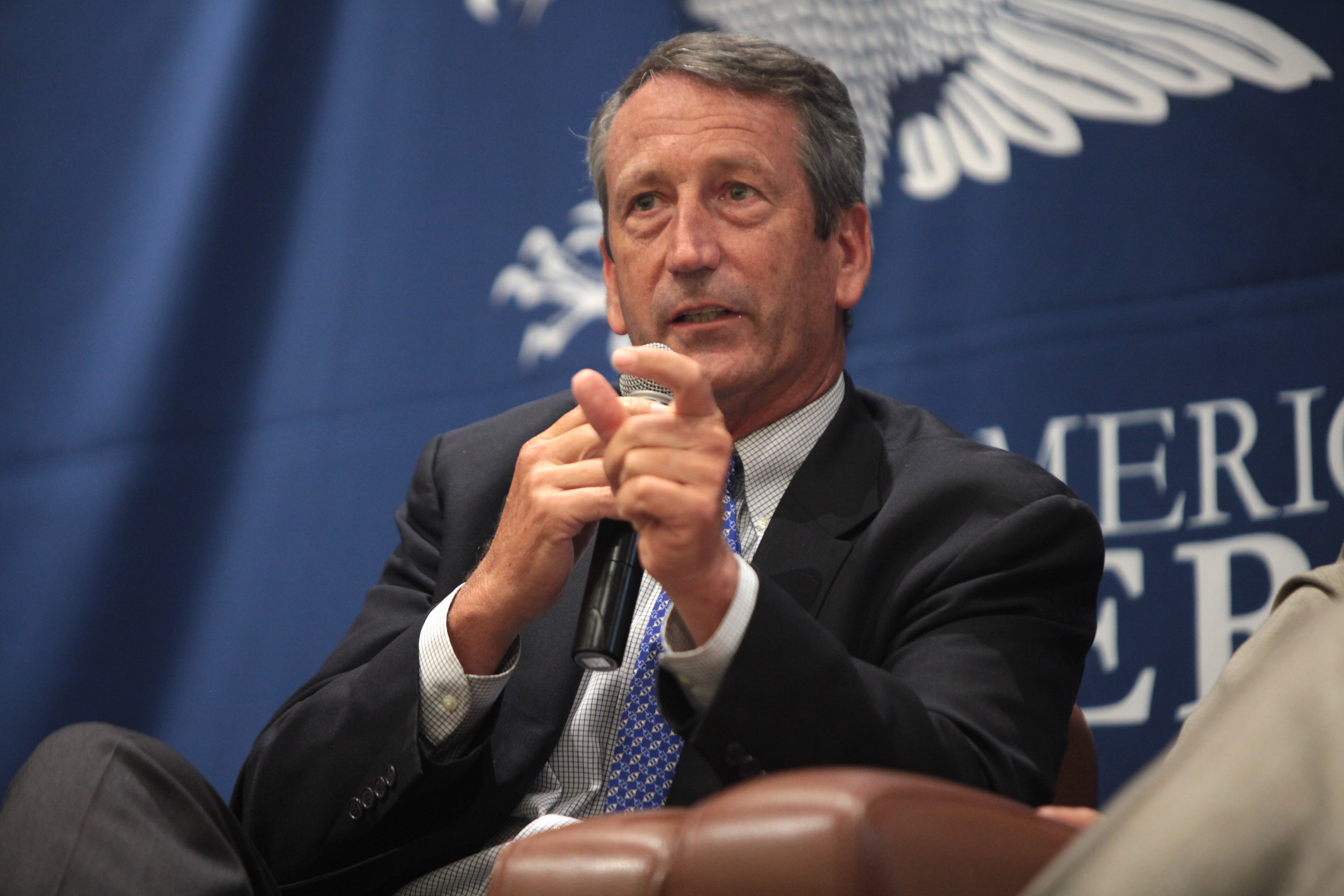
Former Rep. Mark Sanford announced his campaign on September 8, 2019. He withdrew from the race two months later.

- January 17: Former Massachusetts governor Bill Weld changes his voter registration from Libertarian back to Republican, furthering speculation he will announce a primary challenge against Trump.
- January 23: The Republican National Committee votes unanimously to express "undivided support" of Trump's "effective presidency".
- February 11: Trump holds his first mass rally since assuming the presidency in El Paso, Texas, with Brad Parscale, John Cornyn, Lance Berkman, Ted Cruz and Donald Trump Jr.
- February 15: Weld announces the formation of an exploratory committee, becoming the president's first official notable challenger.
- April 15: Weld officially announces his candidacy.
- May 16: Businessman and perennial candidate Rocky De La Fuente files to run.
- June 1: Speculative challenger Maryland governor Larry Hogan announces that he will not run against Trump in the primary.
- June 18: Trump formally launches his 2020 re-election campaign at a rally in Orlando, Florida, with Donald Trump Jr., Mike Pence, Melania Trump, Karen Pence, Lara Trump, and Sarah Sanders.
- July 30: Intending to force Trump to reveal his taxes, Democratic California governor Gavin Newsom signs a bill into state law requiring that presidential candidates release the last five years of their tax returns in order to qualify for the California primary ballot. Republican presidential candidate Rocky De La Fuente files suit directly challenging the constitutionality of the law.
- August 5–6: Additional lawsuits are filed by the Trump campaign, the Republican National Committee, the California Republican Party, and the conservative activist group Judicial Watch to challenge the California law requiring candidates to release their tax returns.
- August 25: Former Illinois congressman Joe Walsh officially announces his candidacy, becoming the president's second official notable challenger.
- September 7: Three state committees vote to cancel their respective primaries/caucuses: Kansas, Nevada, and South Carolina.
- September 8:
  - Former South Carolina governor and congressman Mark Sanford officially announces his candidacy, becoming the president's third notable challenger.
  - As the California law requiring candidates to disclose their tax returns works its way through the courts, the California Republican Party modifies its delegate selection rules as a stop-gap measure, changing its primary from a binding to a non-binding one with a party state convention selecting its national convention delegates directly.
- September 9: The Arizona Republican Party officially notifies Arizona secretary of state Katie Hobbs that they will forego the Arizona Republican primary.
- September 21: The Alaska Republican Party cancels its primary.
- September 23: Donald Trump qualifies for the Vermont primary.
- September 24: Business Insider hosted a debate between Weld and Walsh.
- October 1: Deadline for state parties to file delegate selection plans with the Republican National Committee.
- October 26: Politicon debate between the main challengers.
- October 28: Forbes debate between the main challengers.
- October 31: Minnesota committee submits only Trump's name for the primary ballot.
- November 8: Filing deadline to appear on the Alabama Republican primary ballot. Mark Sanford and Joe Walsh failed to appear, while Donald Trump and Bill Weld both qualified.
- November 12:
  - Mark Sanford dropped out of the race.
  - Filing deadline to appear on the Arkansas Republican primary ballot. Mark Sanford (who dropped out the day of the deadline) and Joe Walsh fail to appear, while Rocky De La Fuente, Donald Trump, and Bill Weld qualify.
- November 15: Filing deadline to appear on the New Hampshire Republican primary ballot. Rocky De La Fuente, Donald Trump, Bill Weld, and Joe Walsh all qualify.
- November 21: The California Supreme Court declares that the state law requiring primary candidates to disclose their tax returns violates the state constitution and cannot be enforced.
- November 26: Rocky De La Fuente filed a lawsuit against the state of Minnesota alleging that its ballot access law for presidential primaries is unconstitutional. Minnesota had previously barred all other candidates from its Republican presidential primary other than Donald Trump on October 31.
- December 6: The California Secretary of State released the list of "Generally Recognized Presidential Candidates" for the upcoming March 3, 2020 election, including seven Republicans.
- December 11:
  - The Hawaii Republican state committee cancels the caucuses and appoints 19 national convention delegates and binds them to Trump, who receives his first official victory.
  - A state court affirms the South Carolina's GOP's right to cancel its primary.
- December 18: The House of Representatives formally votes almost along party lines to impeach Trump.
- December 20: North Carolina announces that Walsh and Weld will appear on the ballot for their GOP primaries. Jim Martin, a business-operator from Lake Elmo, Minnesota, joins with Rocky De La Fuente in suing the state in supreme court for empowering the Republican Party of Minnesota to only print Trump's name on primary ballots.

=== 2020 ===
==== January ====
- January 9: Trump holds his first "Keep America Great" Rally of the year at the Huntington Center in Toledo, Ohio.
- January 17: Early voting begins in Minnesota.
- January 18: First of a series of district conventions in North Dakota, which elect delegates to the state convention. The North Dakota Republican Party does not hold any presidential preference caucus or primary per se, but instead selects their national convention delegates directly at the state party convention.
- January 30: Trump holds a rally in Des Moines, Iowa, the largest event of the caucus campaign.
- January 31: The Kansas Republican convention assembles, where the second delegation to the national convention is chosen and officially bound to Trump.

==== February ====
- February 3: Trump wins the Iowa caucuses, receiving 97% of the votes cast. Weld earns one delegate.
- February 4: Trump gives his final State of the Union address of this term.
- February 5: The United States Senate acquits Trump.
- February 7: Joe Walsh dropped out of the race.
- February 10: Trump holds a rally in Manchester, New Hampshire.
- February 11: Trump wins the New Hampshire primary with 84% of the vote.
- February 21: Trump holds a rally in Las Vegas prior to the Nevada state committee's "presidential preference poll."
- February 22: The Nevada state committee binds the state delegation to Trump.

==== March ====
- March 3:
  - Trump wins all 13 Super Tuesday primaries: Alabama, Arkansas, California, Colorado, Maine, Massachusetts, Minnesota, North Carolina, Oklahoma, Tennessee, Texas, Utah, and Vermont.
  - New York cancels its Republican primary after Trump is the only candidate to submit the required number of names of his delegates. The candidates for delegate are declared elected.
- March 10: Trump wins all 6 races held on this date: Idaho, Michigan, Mississippi, and Missouri; as well as Washington (where he was the only candidate on the ballot), and North Dakota (a non-binding firehouse caucus where he was also unopposed).
- March 14: All nine delegates in the Guam convention are pledged to Donald Trump.
- March 15: Trump wins all nine delegates in the Northern Mariana Islands Republican caucuses.
- March 17: With wins in Florida and Illinois giving him a majority of delegates, President Donald Trump becomes the presumptive Republican presidential nominee.
- March 18: Bill Weld dropped out of the race.
- March 19: Connecticut rescheduled its primary from April 28 to June 2.
- March 20: Indiana rescheduled its expected state primary of May 5 to June 2.

==== April ====
- April 8: New Jersey rescheduled its primary election from June 2 to July 7.
- April 13: Trump won the 2020 Wisconsin Republican presidential primary unopposed.
- April 14: Louisiana rescheduled its primary for the second time, moving the date from June 20 to July 11.
- April 17: Connecticut rescheduled its primary for a second time, from June 2 to August 11.
- April 25: The Alliance Party nominates Rocky De La Fuente for President with Darcy Richardson as his running mate.
- April 28: Trump won the 2020 Ohio Republican presidential primary unopposed.

==== May ====
- May 12: Trump won the Nebraska primary.
- May 19: Trump won the Oregon primary.

==== June ====
- June 2: Trump wins all 8 Super Tuesday primaries: Indiana, Maryland, Montana, New Mexico, Pennsylvania, Rhode Island, South Dakota, and the District of Columbia primaries.
- June 5: The Republican Party of Puerto Rico holds an online caucus vote of party leaders in lieu of an actual primary, binding its delegation to Trump.
- June 9: Trump won both Georgia and West Virginia primaries.
- June 20: The Reform Party nominates Rocky De La Fuente for President with Darcy Richardson as his running mate.
- June 23: Trump won the Kentucky primary.

==== July ====
- July 7: Trump won the Delaware and New Jersey primaries.
- July 11: Trump won the Louisiana primary.

==== August ====
- August 11: Trump won the Connecticut primary.
- August 15: The American Independent Party nominates Rocky De La Fuente for President with Kanye West as his running mate.
- August 24–27: The Republican National Convention was held. Delegates re-nominated Trump for president and Pence for vice president in the 2020 United States presidential election.

== Primary and caucus calendar ==
2020 Republican Party presidential primaries, rules Open primary Semi-closed primary Closed primary Canceled

Some later primary and caucus dates may change depending on legislation passed before the scheduled primary dates. States designated with a "†" indicate that Trump ran unopposed.

Date	Total pledged delegates		Primaries/caucuses
February 3	40		Iowa caucuses
February 11	22		New Hampshire primary
February 22	25		Nevada state convention
March 3 (Super Tuesday)	785	50; 40; 172; 37; 22; 41; 39; 71; 43; 58; 155; 40; 17	Alabama primary Arkansas primary California primary Colorado primary Maine primary† Massachusetts primary Minnesota primary† North Carolina primary Oklahoma primary Tennessee primary Texas primary Utah primary Vermont primary
March 10	242	32; 73; 40; 54; 43	Idaho primary Michigan primary Mississippi primary Missouri primary Washington primary†
March 10	see convention below		End of North Dakota caucuses†
March 14	9		Guam convention
March 15	9		Northern Mariana Islands caucus
March 17	189	122; 67	Florida primary Illinois primary
March 18	9		American Samoa caucus
TBD	29		North Dakota state convention
April 2–4	29		Alaska state convention
April 4 – May 30	9		Virgin Islands caucuses
April 7	52		Wisconsin primary†
April 9	see convention below		End of Arizona caucuses†
April 17	see convention below		End of Virginia caucuses†
April 28	82		Ohio primary†
May 1–2	98	48; 50	Virginia state convention† South Carolina state convention
May 9	86	57; 29	Arizona state convention† Wyoming state convention
May 12	36		Nebraska primary
May 19	28		Oregon primary
June 2	300	58; 38; 27; 22; 88; 19; 29; 19	Indiana primary Maryland primary Montana primary New Mexico primary† Pennsylvania primary Rhode Island primary South Dakota primary District of Columbia primary
June 5	23		Puerto Rico caucuses
June 9	111	76; 35	Georgia primary West Virginia primary
June 23	46		Kentucky primary
July 7	65	16; 49	Delaware primary New Jersey primary†
July 11	46		Louisiana primary
August 11	28		Connecticut primary

Other primaries and caucuses

- Cancellations: Alaska, Arizona, Hawaii, Kansas, Nevada, New York, South Carolina, and Virginia.

== Election day postponements ==
Due to the coronavirus outbreak, a number of presidential primaries were rescheduled:

- The Ohio primary was rescheduled from March 17, 2020, to June 2, 2020. It was later rescheduled again from June 2 to April 28.
- The Georgia primary was rescheduled from March 24, 2020, to May 19, 2020. It was later rescheduled again from May 19 to June 9.
- The Louisiana primary was rescheduled from April 4, 2020, to June 20, 2020. It was later rescheduled again from June 20 to July 11.
- The Connecticut primary was rescheduled from April 28 to June 2. It was later rescheduled a second time to August 11.
- The Delaware, Maryland, Pennsylvania, and Rhode Island primaries were rescheduled from April 28, 2020, to June 2, 2020.
- The Indiana primary was rescheduled from May 5, 2020, to June 2, 2020.
- The West Virginia primary was rescheduled from May 12, 2020, to June 9, 2020.
- The Kentucky primary was rescheduled from May 19, 2020, to June 23, 2020.
- The New Jersey primary was rescheduled from June 2, 2020, to July 7, 2020.

== Ballot access ==
Filing for the Republican primaries began in October 2019. "Yes" means the candidate is on the ballot for the primary contest, and "No" means a candidate is not on the ballot. A “W” indicates a candidate qualified for the ballot but withdrew from the primary, the color indicating if the candidate's name appeared on the ballot (red for not on the ballot, green for on the ballot). States that did not announce candidates who are on the ballot are not included.

State	Date	Rocky De La Fuente (21) (Note: Qualified in 21 states, withdrew from 5)	Donald Trump (35)	Joe Walsh (14)	Bill Weld (25)	Other (12)	Ref.
Iowa	February 3	No	Yes	Yes	Yes	No	
New Hampshire	February 11	Yes	Yes	Yes	Yes	Yes (Note: Robert Ardini, President R. Boddie, Stephen B. Comley Sr., Bob Ely, Larry Horn, Zoltan Istvan, Rick Kraft, Star Locke, Matthew Matern, Mary Maxwell, Eric Merrill, William N. Murphy, and Juan Payne)	
Alabama	March 3	W (Note: Filed but withdrew before ballot was set)	Yes	No	Yes	No	
Arkansas	March 3	W (Note: Withdrawn from state primary)	Yes	No	Yes	No	
California	March 3	Yes	Yes	Yes	Yes	Yes (Note: Robert Ardini, Zoltan Istvan, and Matthew Matern)	
Colorado	March 3	W	Yes	Yes	Yes	Yes	
Maine	March 3	No	Yes	No	No	No	
Massachusetts	March 3	Yes	Yes	Yes	Yes	No	
Minnesota	March 3	No	Yes	No	No	No	
North Carolina	March 3	No	Yes	Yes	Yes	No	
Oklahoma	March 3	Yes	Yes	Yes	No	Yes (Note: Bob Ely, Zoltan Istvan, and Matthew Matern)	
Tennessee	March 3	No	Yes	Yes	Yes	No	
Texas	March 3	Yes	Yes	Yes	Yes	Yes	
Utah	March 3	W	Yes	Yes	Yes	Yes (Note: Robert Ardini, Bob Ely, and Matthew Matern)	
Vermont	March 3	Yes	Yes	No	Yes	No	
Idaho	March 10	Yes	Yes	Yes	Yes	Yes (Note: Bob Ely and Matthew Matern)	
Michigan	March 10	No	Yes	Yes	Yes	Yes (Note: Mark Sanford)	
Mississippi	March 10	Yes	Yes	No	Yes	No	
Missouri	March 10	W	Yes	Yes	Yes	Yes	
Washington	March 10	No	Yes	No	No	No	
Florida	March 17	Yes	Yes	Yes	Yes	No	
Illinois	March 17	Yes	Yes	No	No	No	
Wisconsin	April 7	No	Yes	No	No	No	
Ohio	April 28	No	Yes	No	No	No	
Nebraska	May 12	No	Yes	No	Yes	No	
Oregon	May 19	No	Yes	No	No	No	
Delaware	June 2	Yes	Yes	No	No	No	
Indiana	June 2	No	Yes	No	Yes	No	
Maryland	June 2	No	Yes	No	Yes	No	
New Mexico	June 2	No	Yes	No	No	No	
Pennsylvania	June 2	Yes	Yes	No	Yes	No	
Rhode Island	June 2	Yes	Yes	No	Yes	Yes (Note: Darius La'Ron Mitchell)	
Georgia	June 9	No	Yes	No	No	No	
West Virginia	June 9	Yes	Yes	No	Yes	Yes	
New Jersey	July 7	No	Yes	No	No	Yes	
Louisiana	July 11	Yes	Yes	No	Yes	Yes	
Connecticut	August 11	Yes	Yes	No	W	No	

== National convention ==
Bids for the Republican National Convention were solicited in the fall of 2017, with finalists being announced early the following spring. On July 18, 2018, Charlotte, North Carolina's Spectrum Center was chosen as the site of the convention.

In June 2020, disagreements with the North Carolina government over COVID-19 social distancing rules caused the major events of the convention, including Trump's acceptance speech, to be moved to VyStar Veterans Memorial Arena in Jacksonville, Florida. Due to contractual obligations, official convention business was still conducted in Charlotte.

== Endorsements ==
=== Withdrawn candidates ===
==== Joe Walsh ====
List of Joe Walsh endorsements

Individuals

- George Conway, attorney and spouse of Kellyanne Conway

==== Bill Weld ====
List of Bill Weld endorsements

U.S. Executive Branch officials

- Betty Tamposi, U.S. Assistant Secretary of State for Consular Affairs (1989-1992)
- Trevor Potter, Commissioner of the Federal Election Commission (1991-1995)

U.S. Representatives

- William F. Clinger Jr., U.S. Representative from PA-23 1979-1993, and PA-05 (1993-1997)
- Steven T. Kuykendall, U.S. Representative from CA-36 (1999-2001)
- Jim Leach, U.S. Representative from IA-01 (1977-2003), and IA-02 (2003-2007)
- Tom Petri, U.S. Representative from WI-06 (1979-2015)
- Dick Zimmer, U.S. Representative from NJ-12 (1991-1997)

Governors

- Gary Johnson, Governor of New Mexico (1995-2003) and Libertarian nominee for President in 2016 (co-endorsement with Tulsi Gabbard)
- Phil Scott, Governor of Vermont (2017-present)
- Christine Todd Whitman, Governor of New Jersey (1994-2001) and Administrator of the Environmental Protection Agency (2001-2003)

Statewide officials

- Robert Durand, Massachusetts Secretary of Environmental Affairs (1999–2003)

State legislators

- Doug Scamman, State Representative from New Hampshire (Rockingham District 13) (2004-2010)
- Stella Scamman, State Representative from New Hampshire (Rockingham District 13) (2002-2010)

Individuals

- Liz Mair, conservative political consultant
- Stuart Stevens, travel writer and conservative political consultant

Party officials

- Fergus Cullen, chair of the New Hampshire Republican State Committee 2007-2008
- Jennifer Horn, chair of the New Hampshire Republican State Committee 2013-2017, Republican nominee for New Hampshire's 2nd congressional district in 2008, candidate in 2010

Newspapers

- The Boston Globe
- The Republican

== Campaign finance ==
This is an overview of the money used by each campaign as it is reported to the Federal Election Commission (FEC) and released on February 20, 2020. Totals raised include loans from the candidate and transfers from other campaign committees. The last column, Cash On Hand (COH), shows the remaining cash each campaign had available for its future spending as of January 31, 2020.

Withdrawn candidate

Candidate	Total raised	Individual contributions			Debt	Spent	COH
Candidate	Total raised	Total	Unitemized	Pct	Debt	Spent	COH
Donald Trump	$217,716,419	$84,606,549	$45,436,572	53.7%	$309,116	$132,721,328	$92,606,794
Roque "Rocky" De La Fuente	$15,302,964	$17,253	$4,395	25.5%	$15,081,123	$10,472,140	$4,862,891
Mark Sanford	$107,485	$94,287	$29,013	30.8%	$0	$108,932	-$1,447
Joe Walsh	$502,270	$181,467	$24,866	13.7%	$315,000	$497,922	$4,348
Bill Weld	$1,881,398	$1,602,612	$527,904	32.9%	$250,800	$1,863,208	$18,190

== Results ==
Trump: 100% 90-100% 80-90% 70-80% Other: No Popular Vote

== See also ==
- 2020 United States presidential election

National Conventions

- 2020 Republican National Convention
- 2020 Democratic National Convention
- 2020 Libertarian National Convention
- 2020 Green National Convention
- 2020 Constitution Party National Convention

Presidential primaries:

- 2020 Democratic Party presidential primaries
- 2020 Libertarian Party presidential primaries
- 2020 Green Party presidential primaries
- 2020 Constitution Party presidential primaries
