= 2020 Vermont Republican presidential primary =

- March 3, 2020

17 Republican National Convention delegates

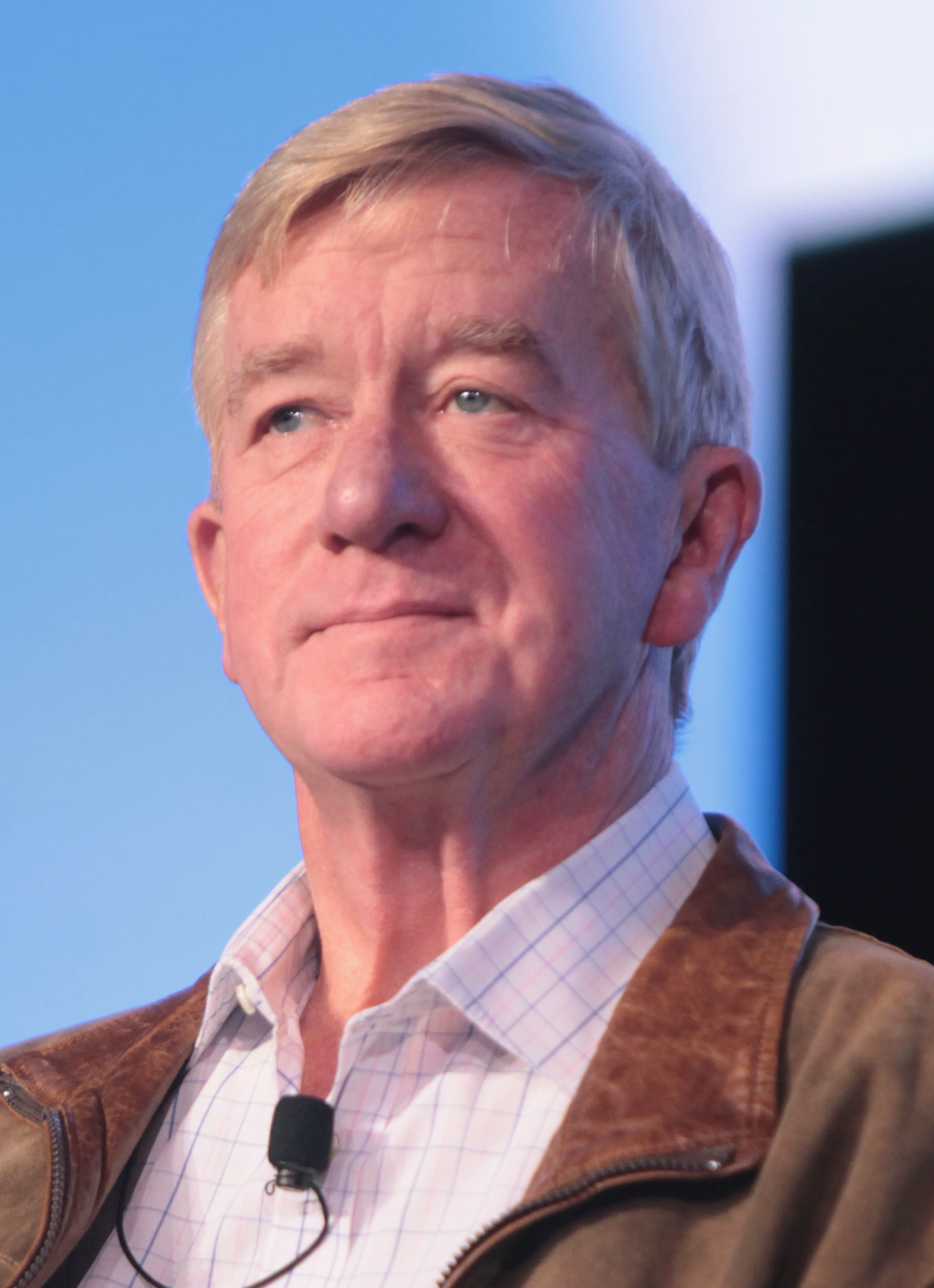
Candidate	Donald Trump	Bill Weld
Home state	Florida	Massachusetts
Delegate count	17	0
Popular vote	33,984	3,971
Percentage	86.49%	10.11%
- County results Trump—90–95% Trump—85–90% Trump—80–85%

The 2020 Vermont Republican presidential primary took place on March 3, 2020, as one of 14 contests scheduled for Super Tuesday in the Republican Party primaries for the 2020 presidential election.

== Results ==
Bill Weld's 10% share of the vote was his second best performance of any state, after Maryland.

2020 Vermont Republican primary
Candidate	Votes	%	Delegates
Donald Trump (incumbent)	33,984	86.49	17
Bill Weld	3,971	10.11	0
Rocky De La Fuente	341	0.87	0
Write-ins	480	1.22	0
Overvotes	37	0.09	0
Blank votes	478	1.22	0
Total	39,291	100%	17

=== Results by county ===
2020 Vermont Republican presidential primary (results per county)
County	Donald Trump		Bill Weld		Rocky De La Fuente		Write-ins		Overvotes		Blank votes		Total votes cast
County	Votes	%	Votes	%	Votes	%	Votes	%	Votes	%	Votes	%	Total votes cast
Addison	2,147	85.27	270	10.72	24	0.95	32	1.27	2	0.08	43	1.71	2,518
Bennington	1,996	87.24	217	9.48	18	0.79	20	0.87	1	0.04	36	1.57	2,288
Caledonia	1,821	87.30	181	8.68	18	0.86	27	1.29	7	0.34	32	1.53	2,086
Chittenden	6,660	84.98	881	11.24	73	0.93	111	1.42	9	0.11	103	1.31	7,837
Essex	681	92.65	24	3.27	3	0.41	13	1.77	0	0	14	1.90	735
Franklin	3,307	89.60	264	7.15	34	0.92	42	1.14	0	0	44	1.19	3,691
Grand Isle	633	90.95	43	6.18	4	0.57	6	0.86	0	0	10	1.44	696
Lamoille	1,036	84.36	150	12.21	10	0.81	23	1.87	2	0.16	7	0.57	1,228
Orange	1,391	83.59	215	12.92	15	0.90	19	1.14	2	0.12	22	1.32	1,664
Orleans	1,392	90.04	113	7.31	11	0.71	12	0.78	0	0	18	1.16	1,546
Rutland	5,303	90.63	399	6.82	43	0.73	70	1.20	3	0.05	33	0.56	5,851
Washington	2,875	82.31	486	13.91	46	1.32	30	0.86	6	0.17	50	1.43	3,493
Windham	1,581	82.22	275	14.30	15	0.78	27	1.40	3	0.16	22	1.14	1,923
Windsor	3,161	84.63	453	12.13	27	0.72	48	1.29	2	0.05	44	1.18	3,735
Total	33,984	86.49	3,971	10.11	341	0.87	480	1.22	37	0.09	478	1.22	39,291

== See also ==
- 2020 Vermont Democratic presidential primary
