= 2020 Washington Republican presidential primary =

- March 10, 2020

43 Republican National Convention delegates
Candidate	Donald Trump
Home state	Florida
Delegate count	43
Popular vote	684,239
Percentage	100.00%

The 2020 Washington Republican presidential primary took place on March 10, 2020, as one of 5 contests scheduled for that day in the Republican Party primaries for the 2020 presidential election.

== Results ==
2020 Washington Republican presidential primary
Candidate	Votes	%	Delegates
Donald Trump (incumbent)	684,239	100.00%	43
Total	684,239	100.00%	43

=== Results by county ===
2020 Washington Republican presidential primary (results per county)
County	Donald Trump		Write-ins		Total votes cast
County	Votes	%	Votes	%	Total votes cast
Adams	1,928	100.00	0	0	1,928
Asotin	3,771	98.67	51	1.33	3,822
Benton	27,055	98.34	457	1.66	27,512
Chelan	11,535	98.77	144	1.23	11,679
Clallam	12,122	98.58	174	1.42	12,296
Clark	51,576	98.41	834	1.59	52,410
Columbia	996	98.71	13	1.29	1,009
Cowlitz	15,410	99.08	143	0.92	15,553
Douglas	6,394	99.32	44	0.68	6,438
Ferry	1,662	99.58	7	0.42	1,669
Franklin	8,242	99.09	76	0.91	8,318
Garfield	550	99.82	1	0.18	551
Grant	12,303	99.20	99	0.80	12,402
Grays Harbor	8,823	98.91	97	1.09	8,920
Island	11,304	97.91	241	2.09	11,545
Jefferson	3,369	98.08	66	1.92	3,435
King	101,141	97.38	2,724	2.62	103,865
Kitsap	27,631	98.34	465	1.66	28,096
Kittitas	6,761	99.18	56	0.82	6,817
Klickitat	3,957	98.83	47	1.17	4,004
Lewis	14,955	99.43	86	0.57	15,041
Lincoln	2,911	99.28	21	0.72	2,932
Mason	9,083	98.55	134	1.45	9,217
Okanogan	6,337	99.12	56	0.88	6,393
Pacific	3,516	98.96	37	1.04	3,553
Pend Oreille	2,894	99.25	22	0.75	2,916
Pierce	78,783	98.45	1,240	1.55	80,023
San Juan	1,391	100.00	0	0	1,391
Skagit	14,751	98.53	220	1.47	14,971
Skamania	1,950	98.48	30	1.52	1,980
Snohomish	66,870	98.09	1,304	1.91	68,174
Spokane	65,889	98.63	913	1.37	66,802
Stevens	10,383	99.20	84	0.80	10,467
Thurston	27,426	98.42	441	1.58	27,867
Wahkiakum	900	99.01	9	0.99	909
Walla Walla	8,090	100.00	0	0	8,090
Whatcom	23,191	98.42	372	1.58	23,563
Whitman	4,312	98.09	84	1.91	4,396
Yakima	24,077	99.00	244	1.00	24,321
Total	684,239	98.41	11,036	1.59	695,275

== See also ==
- 2020 Washington Democratic presidential primary
