= 2020 Michigan Republican presidential primary =

- March 10, 2020

| Candidate | Donald Trump | Uncommitted |
| Home state | Florida | N/A |
| Delegate count | 73 | 0 |
| Popular vote | 640,552 | 32,743 |
| Percentage | 93.7% | 4.8% |

The 2020 Michigan Republican presidential primary took place on March 10, 2020, as one of five contests scheduled for that date in the Republican Party presidential primaries for the 2020 election.

== Results ==
Incumbent United States President Donald Trump was challenged by three candidates: former governor Mark Sanford of South Carolina, former congressman Joe Walsh of Illinois, and former governor Bill Weld of Massachusetts. Sanford and Walsh both withdrew prior to the primary. Michigan is the only primary state where Sanford's name remained on the ballot.

2020 Michigan Republican primary
| Candidate | Votes | % | Estimated delegates |
|---|---|---|---|
| Donald Trump (incumbent) | 640,552 | 93.7% | 73 |
| Uncommitted | 32,743 | 4.8% | 0 |
| Bill Weld | 6,099 | 0.9% | 0 |
| Mark Sanford (withdrawn) | 4,258 | 0.6% | 0 |
| Joe Walsh (withdrawn) | 4,067 | 0.6% | 0 |
| Total | 683,431 | 100% | 73 |
