= 2020 Nebraska Republican presidential primary =

- May 13, 2020

36 Republican National Convention delegates

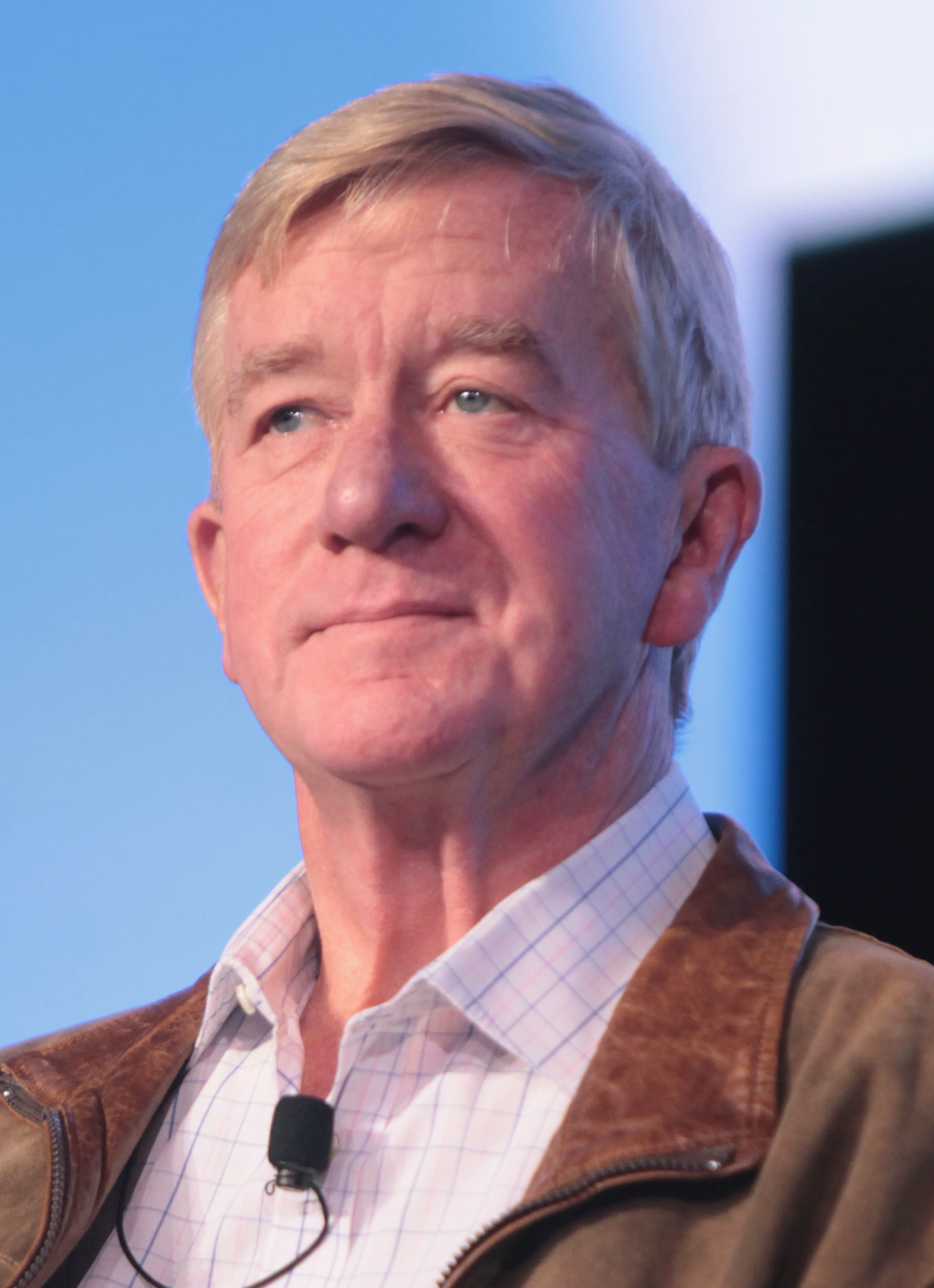
Candidate	Donald Trump	Bill Weld (withdrawn)
Home state	Florida	Massachusetts
Delegate count	36	0
Popular vote	242,032	22,831
Percentage	90.7%	8.6%

The 2020 Nebraska Republican presidential primary took place on May 13, 2020 in the Republican Party primaries for the 2020 presidential election. The primary was a closed primary (only open to party members) although unenrolled voters were permitted to enroll in a party at the polls with same day registration.

== Results ==
2020 Nebraska Republican presidential primary
Candidate	Votes	%	Delegates
Donald Trump	242,035	90.7%	36
Bill Weld (withdrawn)	22,831	8.6%	0
Write-in	1,853	0.7%	0
Total	266,719	100%	36

== See also ==
- 2020 Nebraska Democratic presidential primary
- Nebraska Republican presidential primary results
