= 2020 Pennsylvania Republican presidential primary =

- June 2, 2020

34 Republican National Convention delegates

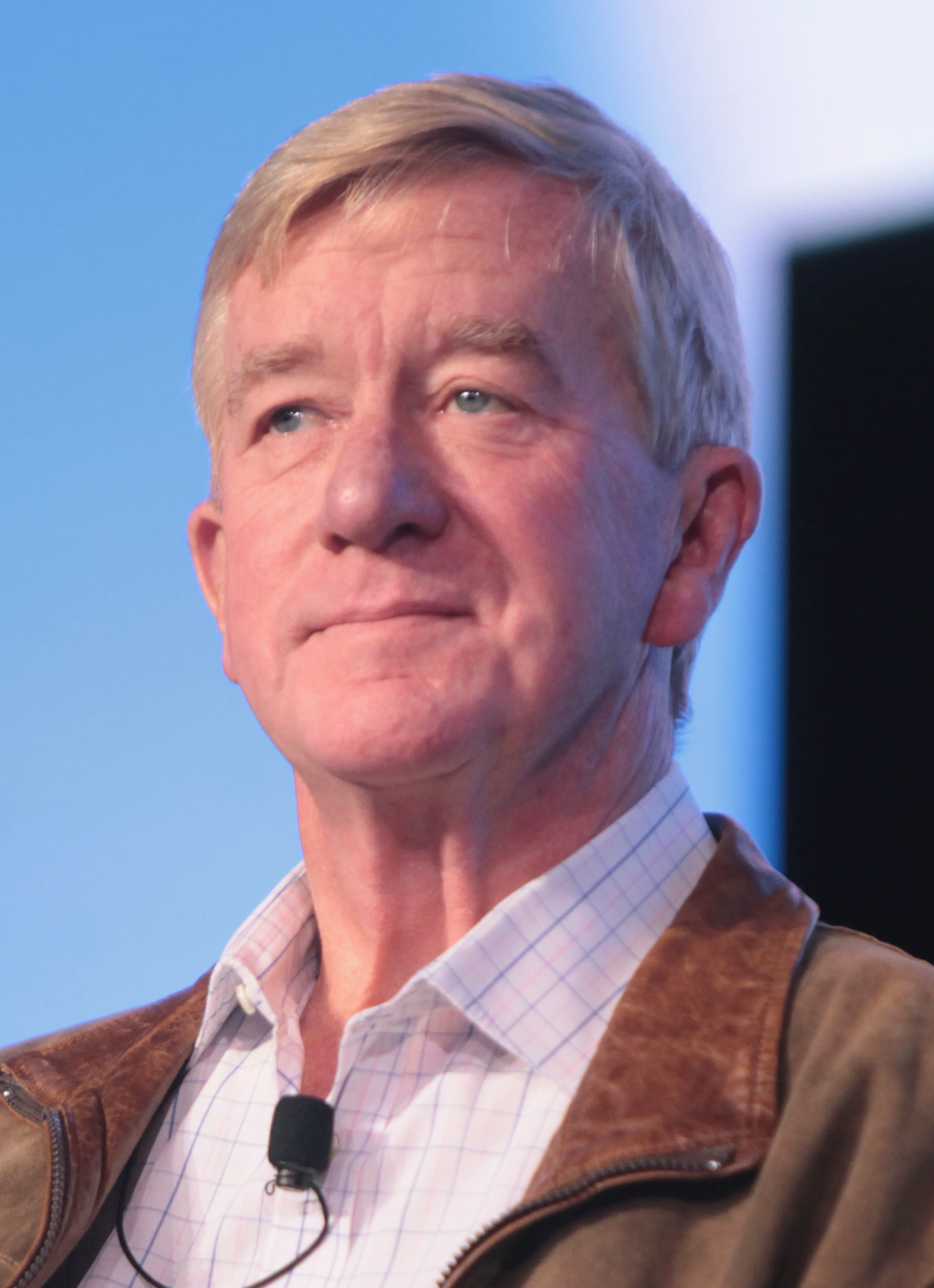
Candidate	Donald Trump	Bill Weld (withdrawn)
Home state	Florida	Massachusetts
Delegate count	34	0
Popular vote	1,053,616	69,427
Percentage	92.1%	6.1%

The 2020 Pennsylvania Republican presidential primary took place on June 2, 2020, as one of 7 contests scheduled for that day in the Republican Party primaries for the 2020 presidential election.

Even though the Republican National Committee mailed Pennsylvania voters encouraging mail-in voting, describing it as a "convenient and secure” option, most Republicans expressed opposition to the prospect. Earlier, the Republican-controlled House blocked a proposal to mail every Pennsylvanian a mail-in ballot application. This was in response to President Trump's skepticism of the practice, expressing concern mail-in voting may result in voter fraud that would potentially benefit the Democratic Party.

== Results ==
2020 Pennsylvania Republican presidential primary
Candidate	Votes	%	Delegates
Donald Trump	1,053,616	92.1%	34
Bill Weld	69,427	6.1%	0
Rocky De La Fuente	20,456	1.8%	0
Total	1,143,499	100%	34

Trump was declared the winner in the Republican primary, and received all of the state's 34 pledged delegates to the 2020 Republican National Convention (the state also has 54 unpledged delegates).

== See also ==
- 2020 Pennsylvania Democratic presidential primary
