= 2020 Wisconsin Republican presidential primary =

- April 7, 2020

52 Republican National Convention delegates

| Candidate | Donald Trump | Uninstructed |
| Home state | Florida | N/A |
| Delegate count | 52 | 0 |
| Popular vote | 616,782 | 11,246 |
| Percentage | 97.87% | 1.78% |

The 2020 Wisconsin Republican presidential primary took place on April 7, 2020. It is one of the Republican Party primaries for the 2020 presidential election.

== Impact of the COVID-19 pandemic ==
The April 7 primary elections and the election for a state Supreme Court justice and other local races ran as scheduled. Many poll workers have not wanted to put their health at risk during the COVID-19 pandemic in Wisconsin, and polling places across the state faced a shortage of workers. Health officials were concerned about enforcing social distancing guidelines. Governor Tony Evers (D) proposed changing to an all-mail-in election, but the idea was rejected by the Republican-controlled legislature. Despite admitting that he would violate the law by doing so, Evers then issued an executive order on April 6 to postpone the election to June 9. Republican leaders immediately announced that they would challenge the order in the Wisconsin Supreme Court. The Wisconsin Supreme Court ruled that Evers did not have the authority to postpone the elections, thus meaning that Evers' executive order was nullified, and that the elections would be held as scheduled on April 7. By the time the election concluded, Milwaukee Election Commissioner Neil Albrecht stated that despite some of the problems, the in-person voting ran smoothly.

== Results ==
2020 Wisconsin Republican presidential primary
| Candidate | Votes | % | Delegates |
|---|---|---|---|
| Donald Trump | 616,782 | 97.87 | 52 |
| Adam Nicholas Paul (write-in) | 246 | 0.04 | |
| Other Write-ins | 1,924 | 0.31 | |
| Uninstructed Delegate | 11,246 | 1.78 | |
| Total | 630,198 | 100% | 52 |

== See also ==
- Impact of the COVID-19 pandemic on politics
- 2020 Wisconsin Democratic primary
- 2020 Republican National Convention
- 2020 United States presidential election in Wisconsin
