= 2020 American Samoa presidential caucuses =

2020 United States presidential caucuses in American Samoa
- 2020 American Samoa Democratic presidential caucus
- March 3, 2020

11 Democratic National Convention delegates (6 pledged, 5 unpledged) The number of pledged delegates won is determined by the popular vote
- Turnout: 2.2% (registered voters) ▲0.7 pp
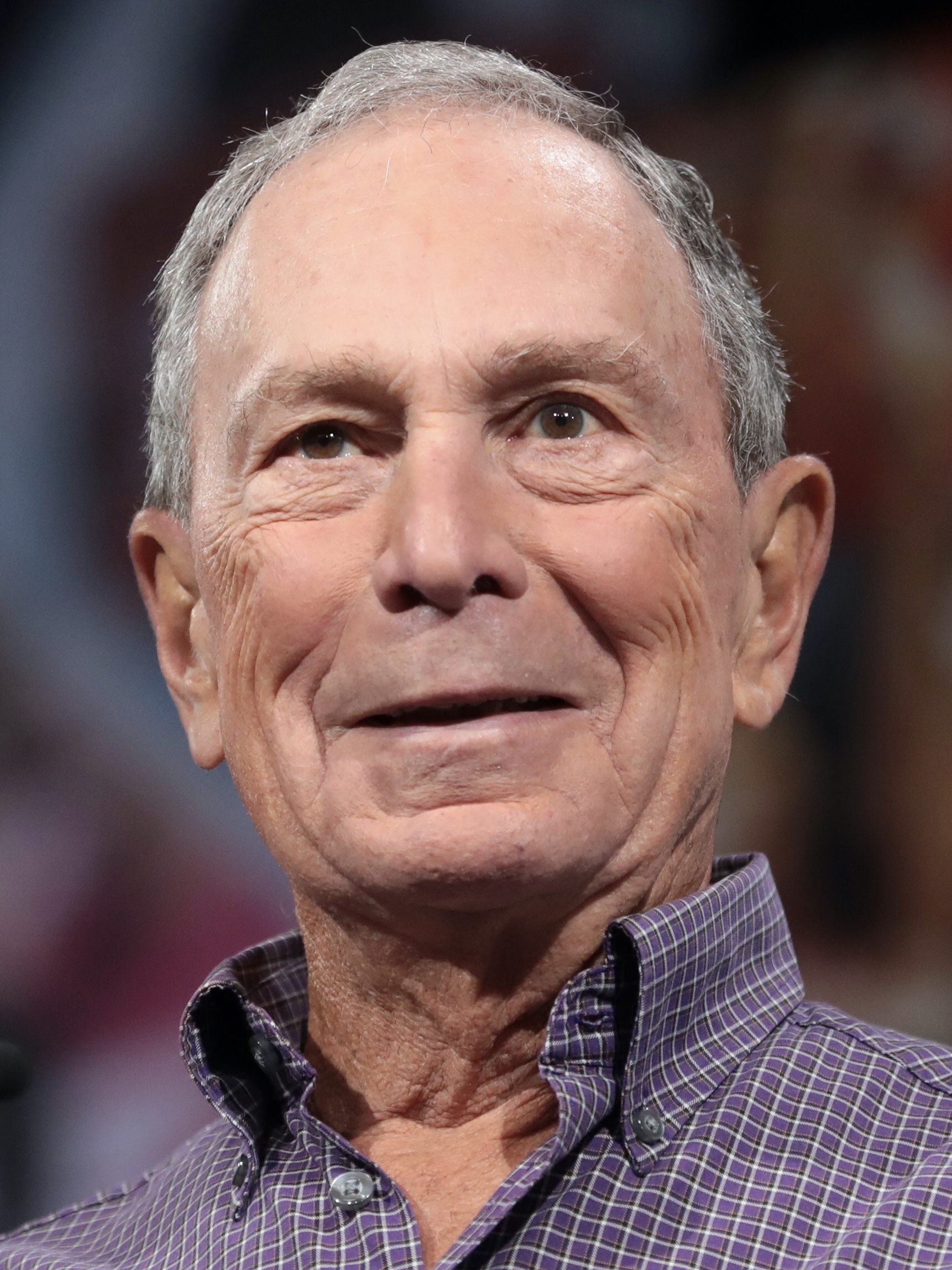

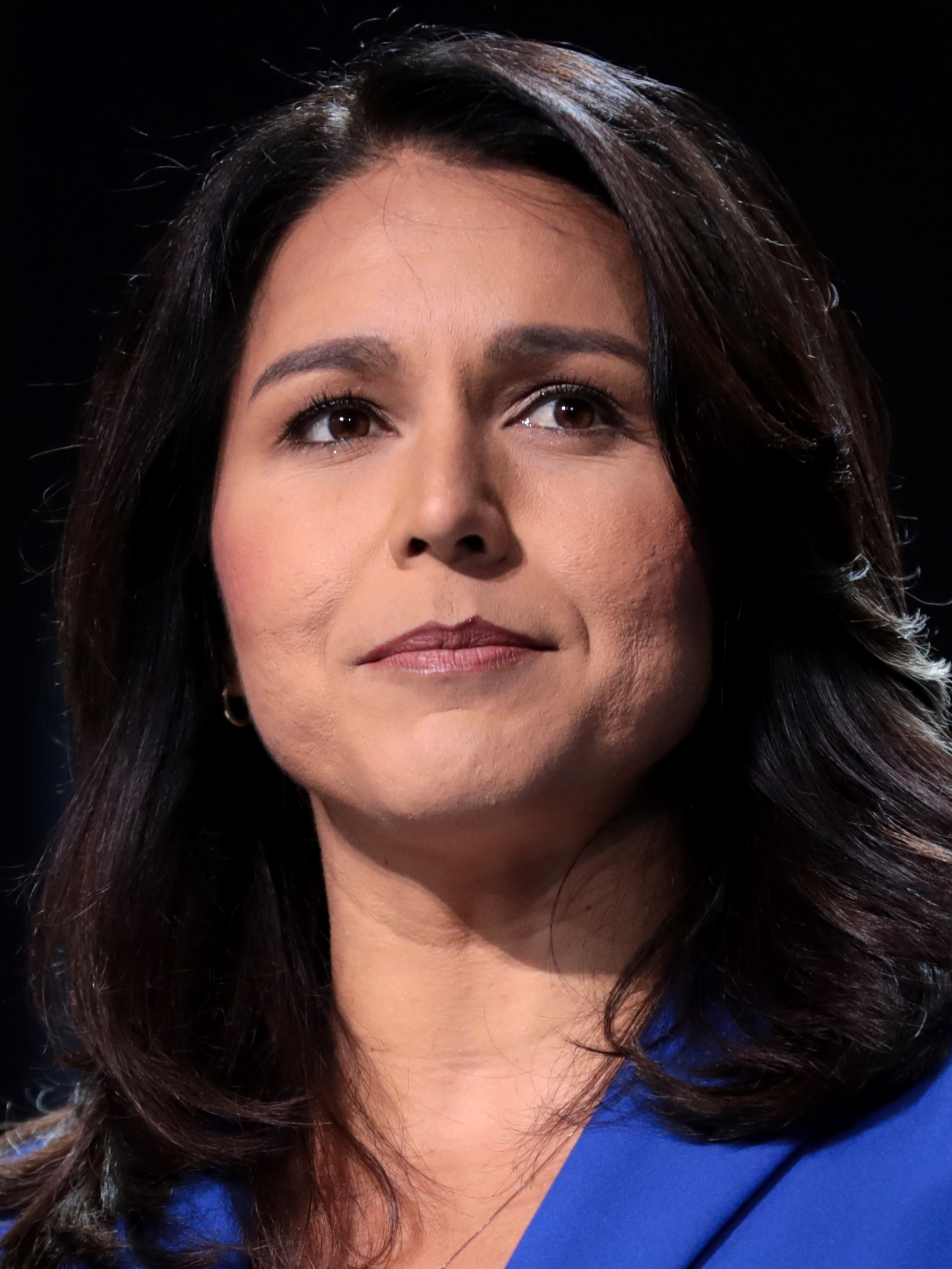

Candidate	Michael Bloomberg	Tulsi Gabbard
Home state	New York	Hawaii
Delegate count	4	2
Popular vote	175	103
Percentage	49.86%	29.34%
Candidate	Bernie Sanders	Joe Biden
Home state	Vermont	Delaware
Delegate count	0	0
Popular vote	37	31
Percentage	10.54%	8.83%
- 2020 American Samoa Republican presidential caucus
- March 18, 2020

9 originally unbound Republican National Convention delegates The delegates were bound by party resolution
Candidate	Donald Trump
Home state	Florida
Delegate count	9
Popular vote	uncontested
Percentage	100%

Although American Samoa did not participate in the 2020 presidential election because it is a U.S. territory and not a state, it still participated in the U.S. presidential primaries and caucuses. Former mayor Michael Bloomberg won the Democratic caucus, held on March 3. The Republican caucus, in the form of a territorial convention held on March 18, endorsed incumbent President Donald Trump.

== Democratic caucus ==
The 2020 American Samoa Democratic presidential caucus took place on March 3, 2020, alongside 14 state primaries on Super Tuesday in the Democratic Party primaries and caucuses for the 2020 presidential election, following the South Carolina primary the weekend before. The American Samoa caucus was an open caucus, with the territory awarding 11 delegates towards the 2020 Democratic National Convention, of which 6 were pledged delegates allocated on the basis of the results of the caucus. Former mayor Michael Bloomberg won the caucus and netted four delegates (his only primary win), with representative Tulsi Gabbard coming in second, and winning her only two delegates.

=== Procedure ===
When the American Samoa Democratic Party had published its draft delegate selection plan on July 3, 2019, it specified a Super Tuesday, March 3 date for the 2020 caucus; this date was finally declared via Facebook on February 1, 2020.

In the open caucus, candidates had to meet a threshold of 15 percent across the territory to be considered viable. The 6 pledged delegates to the 2020 Democratic National Convention were allocated proportionally on the basis of the results of the caucus, and were all at-large pledged delegates. The Super Tuesday caucus as part of Stage I on the primary timetable received no bonus delegates, in order to disperse the primaries and caucuses between more different date clusters and keep too many states from hoarding on the first shared date or on a March date in general.

The delegation also included 5 unpledged PLEO delegates: 4 members of the Democratic National Committee and the governor Lolo Matalasi Moliga.

=== Candidates ===
The following people were on the ballot in American Samoa.

- Joe Biden
- Michael Bloomberg
- Tulsi Gabbard
- Bernie Sanders
- Elizabeth Warren

Pete Buttigieg, Amy Klobuchar, Deval Patrick, Tom Steyer and Andrew Yang had withdrawn shortly before the caucus but remained on the ballot. Kamala Harris had withdrawn early so that she was not put on the ballot. However, none of the withdrawn candidates or the existing uncommitted option received any votes.

=== Campaign ===
According to The Wall Street Journal, Bloomberg's campaign made a relatively significant investment in the caucus: Bloomberg's campaign opened a campaign headquarters in the territory and hired seven staffers in America Samoa. His campaign put up campaign signs that read Mike Bloomberg mo Amerika Samoa 2020 (English translation: "Mike Bloomberg for American Samoa 2020") and invested heavily in digital advertising on Facebook.

Samoan chief Fa’alagiga Nina Tua’au-Glaude, a 2008 Barack Obama delegate, endorsed Bloomberg a day before the contest, citing his policies on climate change in particular as a reason for his endorsement. Bloomberg's victory over Gabbard, who was born in the territory, was regarded as an upset victory, and was credited to Gabbard's late start in campaigning on the island.

=== Results ===
2020 American Samoa Democratic presidential caucus
Candidate	Votes	%	Delegates
Michael Bloomberg	175	49.86	4
Tulsi Gabbard	103	29.34	2
Bernie Sanders	37	10.54	
Joe Biden	31	8.83	
Elizabeth Warren	5	1.42	
Uncommitted	0	0.00	
Total	351	100%	6

== Republican caucus ==
The 2020 American Samoa Republican presidential caucus took place as a territorial convention on March 18, 2020, in the Republican Party primaries and caucuses for the 2020 presidential election. The 9 delegates to the 2020 Republican National Convention were unbound, unless instructed otherwise by a resolution passed by the convention. The territory's party officially endorsed incumbent President Donald Trump at its convention, and thus all 9 delegates were expected to vote for him at the national convention.
