= 2020 Montana Republican presidential primary =

- June 2, 2020

22 Republican National Convention delegates

Candidate	Donald Trump	Uncommitted
Home state	Florida	–
Delegate count	22	–
Popular vote	200,174	13,184
Percentage	93.82%	6.18%
Trump
80–90%
>90%

The 2020 Montana Republican presidential primary took place on June 2, 2020, as one of 7 contests scheduled for that day in the Republican Party primaries for the 2020 presidential election.

== Results ==
2020 Montana Republican presidential primary
Candidate	Votes	%	Delegates
Donald Trump	200,174	93.82%	22
Uncommitted	13,184	6.18%	
Total	213,358	100.00%	22

== See also ==
- 2020 Montana Democratic presidential primary
- 2020 Montana elections
