= 2020 Oregon Democratic presidential primary =

- May 19, 2020

74 delegates (61 pledged, 13 unpledged) to the Democratic National Convention The number of pledged delegates won is determined by the popular vote

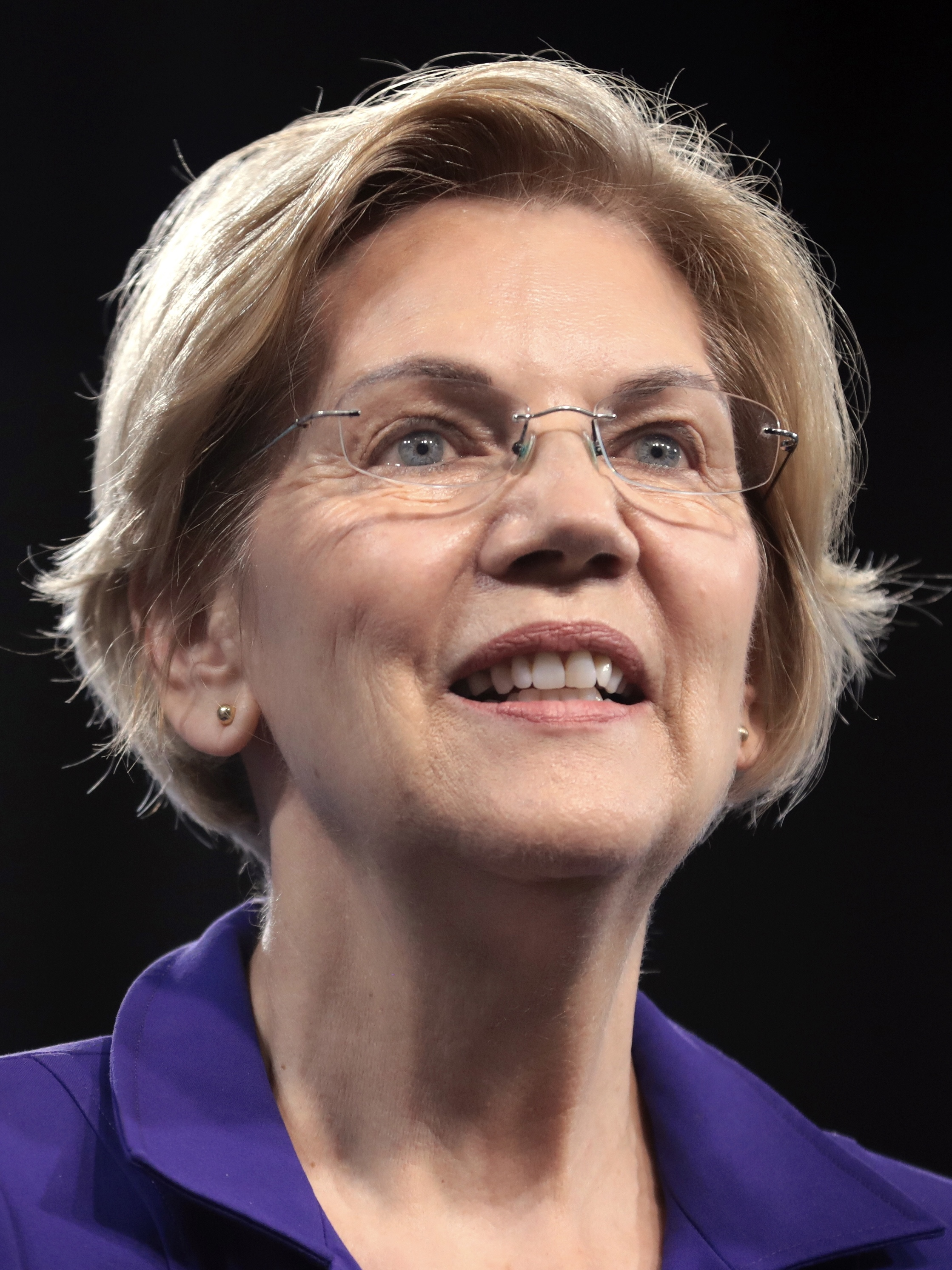
| Candidate | Joe Biden | Bernie Sanders (withdrawn) | Elizabeth Warren (withdrawn) |
| Home state | Delaware | Vermont | Massachusetts |
| Delegate count | 46 | 15 | 0 |
| Popular vote | 408,315 | 127,345 | 59,355 |
| Percentage | 65.99% | 20.58% | 9.59% |
County results
Biden
50 – 60%
60 – 70%
70 – 80%

Pledged national convention delegates
| Type | Del. |
|---|---|
| CD1 | 9 |
| CD2 | 6 |
| CD3 | 12 |
| CD4 | 7 |
| CD5 | 7 |
| PLEO | 7 |
| At-large | 13 |
| Total pledged delegates | 61 |

The 2020 Oregon Democratic presidential primary took place on May 19, 2020, in the Democratic Party primaries for the 2020 presidential election and was the only contest on that date. The Kentucky primary, previously also scheduled for May 19, was delayed due to the coronavirus pandemic, while Oregon already had a total vote-by-mail primary. The Oregon primary was a closed primary and awarded 74 delegates to the 2020 Democratic National Convention, of whom 61 were pledged delegates allocated on the basis of the primary results.

Former vice president Joe Biden won the primary with 66% of the vote and 46 delegates, while senator Bernie Sanders, who had suspended his campaign a month earlier, received nearly 21% and 15 delegates and senator Elizabeth Warren, also withdrawn, reached almost 10% of the vote.

== Procedure ==
Following Kentucky's postponement of its primary to June 23, Oregon was the only state to vote on May 19, 2020, in the Democratic primaries and did not need to move the primary, as Oregon had been holding elections solely through voting by mail for decades. Two bills had been introduced in the state house in January 2019 that would have shifted the whole primary date to the second Tuesday in March in even-numbered years (which would be tantamount to a primary a week after Super Tuesday), with the first empowering the Oregon secretary of state to shift the date and the second permitting a primary move for the purpose of regional clustering, but neither bill moved beyond committee. Another bill introduced by Republicans in the state senate in March 2019 had also proposed shifting the Oregon primary to join Super Tuesday states on the first Tuesday in March with a separate presidential primary rather than a consolidated primary, but no further action was taken on the bill after an initial public hearing.

Oregon was expected to accept mail-in ballots until 8:00 p.m. local time. Candidates had to meet a threshold of 15% at the congressional district or statewide level to be considered viable. The 61 pledged delegates to the 2020 Democratic National Convention were allocated proportionally on the basis of the primary results. Of these, between 6 and 12 were allocated to each of the state's five congressional districts and another 7 were allocated to party leaders and elected officials (PLEO delegates), in addition to 13 at-large delegates. Originally planned with 52 delegates, the final number included a 20% bonus of 9 additional delegates on the 34 district and 11 at-large delegates awarded by the Democratic National Committee due to the May date, which belonged to Stage III on the primary timetable. Senators Jeff Merkley and Ron Wyden stepped aside as delegation co-chairs in the wake of the George Floyd murder and supported Travis Nelson and Rosa Colquitt as co-chairs. Travis Nelson led the Bernie Sanders delegation and Rosa Colquitt led the Joe Biden delegation.

Congressional district conventions and the state convention instead of meeting voted by mail between May 27 and June 12 on district-level and statewide delegates to the Democratic National Convention. The delegation also included 13 unpledged PLEO delegates: 6 members of the Democratic National Committee, 6 members of Congress (both senators and four representatives), and the governor Kate Brown.

== Candidates ==
The following candidates were on the ballot in Oregon:

- Joe Biden
- Tulsi Gabbard (withdrawn)
- Bernie Sanders (withdrawn)
- Elizabeth Warren (withdrawn)

== Polling ==
| Poll source | Date(s) administered | Sample size | Margin of error | Bernie Sanders | Joe Biden | Undecided | Beto O'Rourke | Kamala Harris | Elizabeth Warren | Cory Booker | Andrew Yang | Pete Buttigieg | Other |
|---|---|---|---|---|---|---|---|---|---|---|---|---|---|
| Zogby Analytics | Mar 18–19, 2019 | 238 | ± 6.4% | 27% | 26% | 11% | 8% | 6% | 6% | 4% | 4% | 3% | 7% (Note: Castro, Delaney, Gabbard, Gillibrand, Hickenlooper, Inslee, and McAuliffe with 1%) |

== Results ==
2020 Oregon Democratic presidential primary
| Candidate | Votes | % | Delegates |
|---|---|---|---|
| Joe Biden | 408,315 | 65.99 | 46 |
| Bernie Sanders (withdrawn) | 127,345 | 20.58 | 15 |
| Elizabeth Warren (withdrawn) | 59,355 | 9.59 | |
| Tulsi Gabbard (withdrawn) | 10,717 | 1.73 | |
| Write-in votes | 12,979 | 2.10 | |
| Total | 618,711 | 100% | 61 |

== See also ==
- 2020 Oregon Republican presidential primary

== Notes ==
Additional candidates
