= 2020 Mississippi Republican presidential primary =

- March 10, 2020

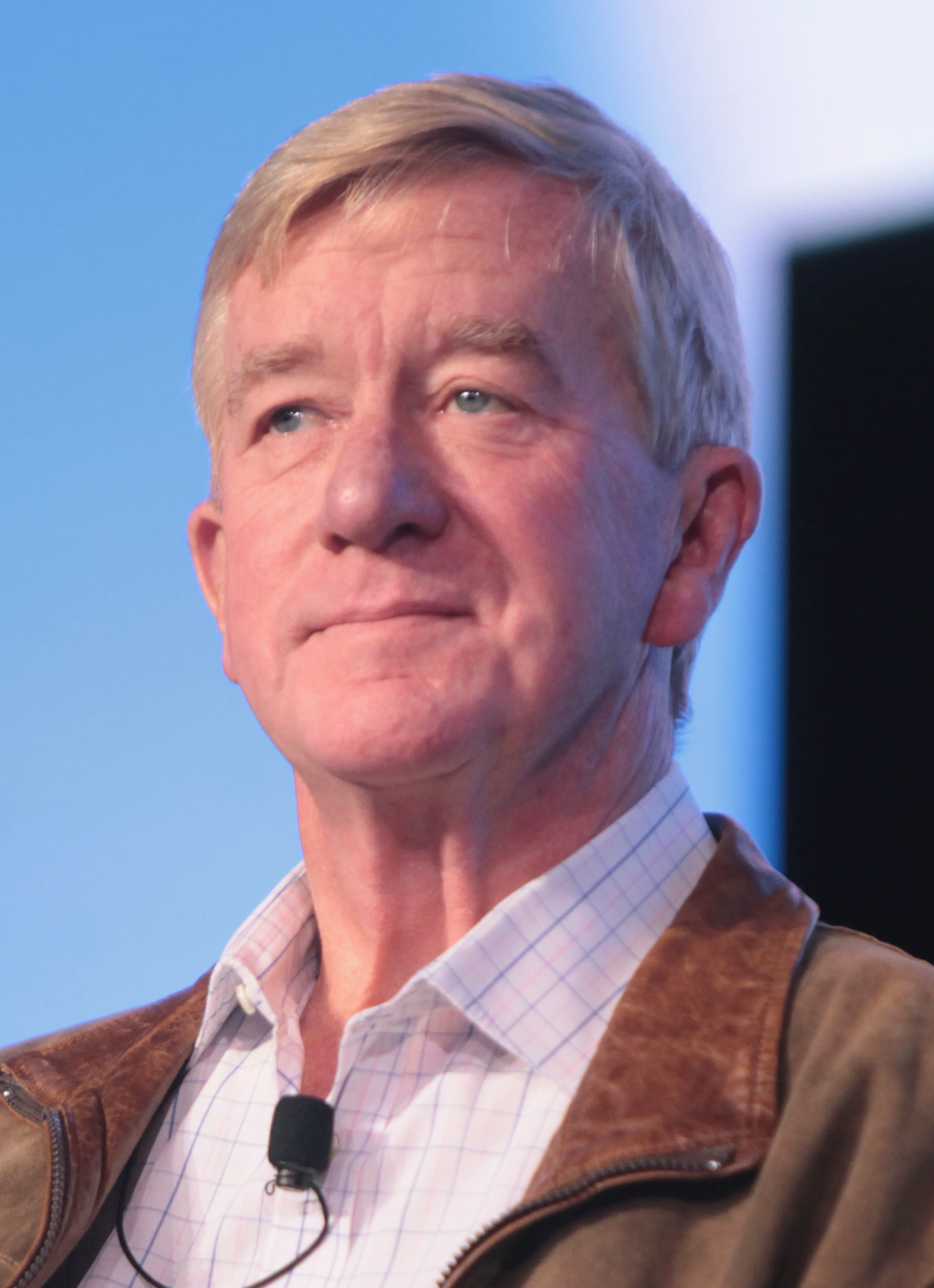
Candidate	Donald Trump	Bill Weld
Home state	Florida	Massachusetts
Delegate count	40	0
Popular vote	240,127	2,292
Percentage	98.61%	0.9%

The 2020 Mississippi Republican presidential primary took place on March 10, 2020, as one of five contests scheduled for that date in the Republican presidential primaries for the 2020 election.

== Results ==
Incumbent President Donald Trump was challenged by two candidates: businessman and perennial candidate Rocky De La Fuente of California, and former governor Bill Weld of Massachusetts.

2020 Mississippi Republican primary
Candidate	Votes	%	Estimated delegates
Donald Trump (incumbent)	240,125	98.6%	40
Bill Weld	2,292	0.9%	0
Rocky De La Fuente	1,078	0.4%	0
Total	243,495	100%	40
