= 2020 New Mexico Republican presidential primary =

- June 2, 2020

22 Republican National Convention delegates

Candidate	Donald Trump	Uncommitted
Home state	Florida	–
Delegate count	22	–
Popular vote	144,067	13,809
Percentage	91.3%	8.7%

The 2020 New Mexico Republican presidential primary took place on June 2, 2020, as one of 7 contests scheduled for that day in the Republican Party primaries for the 2020 presidential election.

== Results ==
2020 New Mexico Republican primary
Candidate	Votes	%	Delegates
Donald Trump	144,067	91.25%	22
Uncommitted Delegate	13,809	8.75%	
Total	157,876	100%	22
