= 2020 Texas Republican presidential primary =

- March 3, 2020

Candidate	Donald Trump	Uncommitted
Home state	Florida	N/A
Delegate count	117	0
Popular vote	1,898,664	71,803
Percentage	94.13%	3.56%

The 2020 Texas Republican presidential primary took place in Texas, United States, on March 3, 2020, as one of 13 contests scheduled on Super Tuesday in the Republican Party primaries for the 2020 presidential election. The Texas primary was an open primary, with the state awarding 155 delegates towards the 2020 Republican National Convention.

== Candidates ==
Filing for the primary began in early November 2019. The following candidates have filed and are on the ballot in Texas:

Running

- Rocky De La Fuente
- Zoltan Istvan
- Matthew Matern
- Donald Trump
- Bill Weld

Withdrawn

- Joe Walsh

== Results ==
2020 Texas Republican Party presidential primary
Candidate	Popular vote		Delegates
Candidate	Count	Percentage	Delegates
Donald Trump (incumbent)	1,898,664	94.13%	117
Uncommitted	71,803	3.56%	0
Bill Weld	15,739	0.78%	0
Joe Walsh	15,824	0.78%	0
Rocky De La Fuente	7,563	0.38%	0
Bob Ely	3,582	0.37%	0
Matthew Matern	3,525	0.18%	0
Zoltan Istvan	1,447	0.07%	0
Total:	2,017,167	100%	155

=== Results by county ===
Trump won in every county.

2020 Texas Republican primary
County	De La Fuente Guerra	%	Ely	%	Istvan	%	Matern	%	Trump	%	Walsh	%	Weld	%	Uncommitted	%	Total votes cast	Turnout
Anderson	16	0.20	1	0.01	1	0.01	15	0.19	7,646	96.63	30	0.38	24	0.30	180	2.27	7,913	28.07
Andrews	28	1.15	2	0.08	0	0.00	6	0.25	2,281	93.41	22	0.90	9	0.37	94	3.85	2,442	24.53
Angelina	20	0.16	23	0.18	5	0.04	21	0.16	12,166	94.97	79	0.62	59	0.46	437	3.41	12,810	24.82
Aransas	10	0.24	8	0.19	8	0.19	2	0.05	3,820	92.14	39	0.94	25	0.60	234	5.64	4,146	23.89
Archer	5	0.19	13	0.50	5	0.19	3	0.12	2,455	94.86	18	0.70	9	0.35	80	3.09	2,588	40.87
Armstrong	1	0.14	1	0.14	1	0.14	0	0.00	676	96.99	5	0.72	1	0.14	12	1.72	697	48.30
Atascosa	30	0.67	5	0.11	2	0.04	9	0.20	4,220	94.05	27	0.60	14	0.31	180	4.01	4,487	15.97
Austin	9	0.18	5	0.10	2	0.04	9	0.18	4,662	95.56	22	0.45	28	0.57	142	2.91	4,879	24.79
Bailey	16	1.74	1	0.11	1	0.11	1	0.11	832	90.73	9	0.98	6	0.65	51	5.56	917	26.21

== See also ==
- 2020 Texas Democratic presidential primary
