= 2020 Maryland Republican presidential primary =

- June 2, 2020

38 pledged delegates to the Republican National Convention

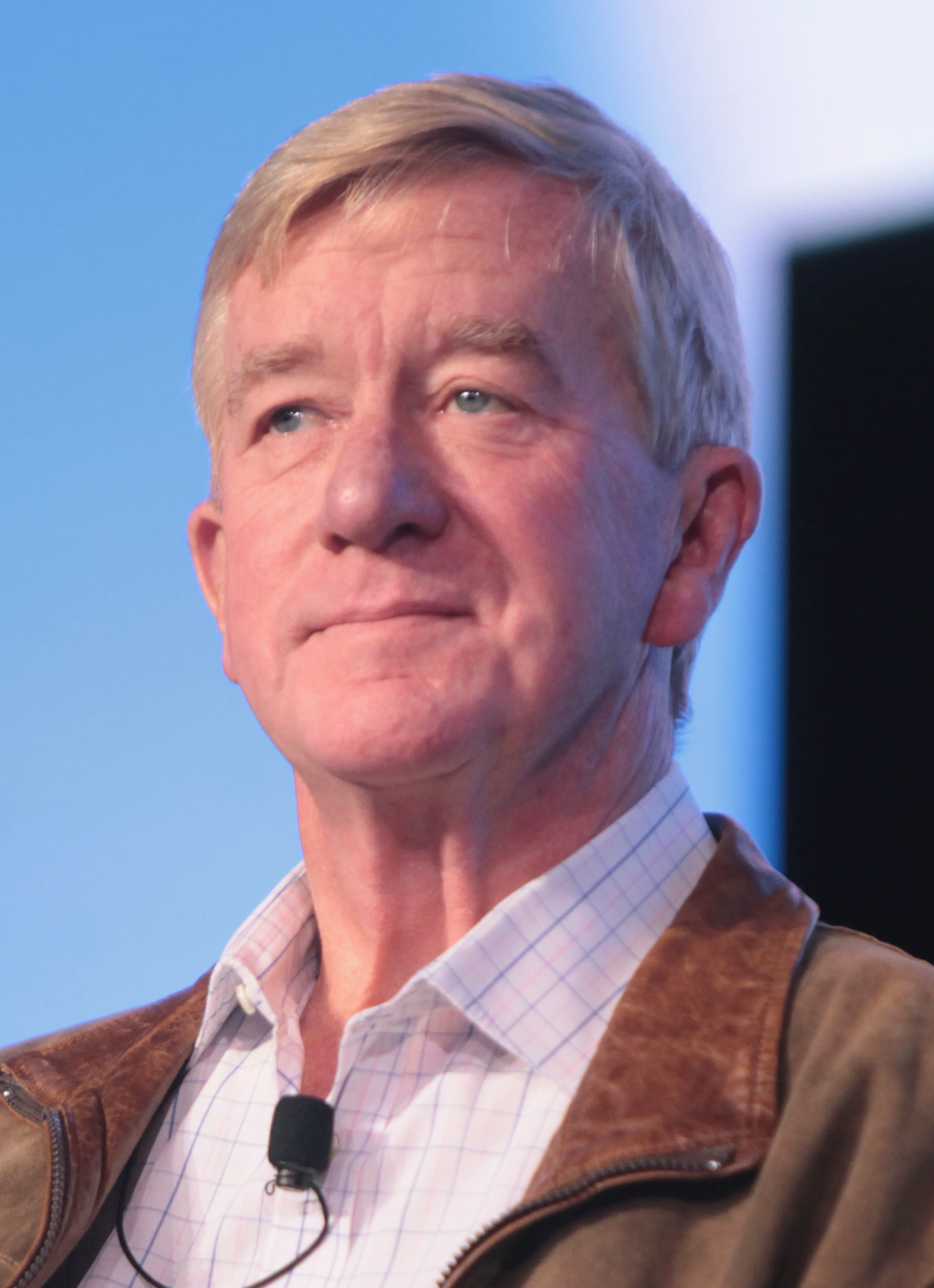
Candidate	Donald Trump	Bill Weld (withdrawn)
Home state	Florida	Massachusetts
Delegate count	38	0
Popular vote	295,787	44,501
Percentage	86.92%	13.08%
County results
Trump
70–80%
80–90%
>90%

The 2020 Maryland Republican presidential primary was held on June 2, 2020 along with seven other state nominating contests in the Republican Party presidential primaries for the 2020 presidential election. Donald Trump won the primary and all of the state's 38 delegates. Bill Weld, despite having ended his presidential campaign in March, received his highest share of the popular vote in this primary.

== Results ==
2020 Maryland Republican presidential primary
Candidate	Vote		Delegates
Candidate	#	%	Delegates
Donald Trump	295,787	86.92	38
Bill Weld (withdrawn)	44,501	13.08	0
Total valid votes	340,288	100%	38
