= 2020 Ohio Republican presidential primary =

- April 28, 2020

82 Republican National Convention delegates The delegates won are determined by a winner-takes-all vote
Candidate	Donald Trump
Home state	Florida
Delegate count	82
Popular vote	713,546
Percentage	100%

The 2020 Ohio Republican presidential primary took place through April 28, 2020, completely by mail-in voting. Due to the COVID-19 pandemic in the United States the primary, originally scheduled for March 17, 2020, was moved and voting by mail was designated as the sole voting form and extended until April 28, 2020, with April 27 being the final deadline for a ballot to have been received and postmarked by the post. Hand-dropping the mail-in ballot on April 28 was also possible.

== Results ==
2020 Ohio Republican primary
Candidate	Votes	%	Delegates
Donald Trump	713,546	100.00	82
Total	713,546	100%	82
