= 2020 Puerto Rico presidential primaries =

As a U.S. territory, Puerto Rico does not participate in the U.S. presidential general election, only the U.S. presidential caucuses and primaries

Although Puerto Rico does not participate in U.S. presidential general elections because it is an unincorporated territory and not a state, and therefore cannot send members to the U.S. Electoral College, Puerto Ricans are citizens of the United States and do participate in the U.S. presidential primaries.

== Democratic primary ==
Puerto Rico's Democratic primary was originally scheduled to take place on Sunday, March 29, 2020, but the Legislative Assembly and Governor Wanda Vázquez signed legislation on March 21 for it to be postponed to April 26, amid concerns regarding the COVID-19 pandemic in Puerto Rico. On April 2, it was then postponed again with a new date to be determined later. By May, it was rescheduled for July 12.

The Puerto Rico primary is an open primary, with the territory awarding 59 delegates, of which 51 are pledged delegates allocated on the basis of the results of the primary.

== Republican primary ==
2020 Puerto Rico Republican presidential primary
- June 5, 2020

23 delegates
Candidate	Donald Trump
Home state	Florida
Delegate count	23

The Republican Party of Puerto Rico held an online poll of party leaders on June 5, 2020, in lieu of an actual primary, awarding all 23 of its pledged delegates to the 2020 Republican National Convention to incumbent President Donald Trump.
