= 2020 Massachusetts Republican presidential primary =

- March 3, 2020

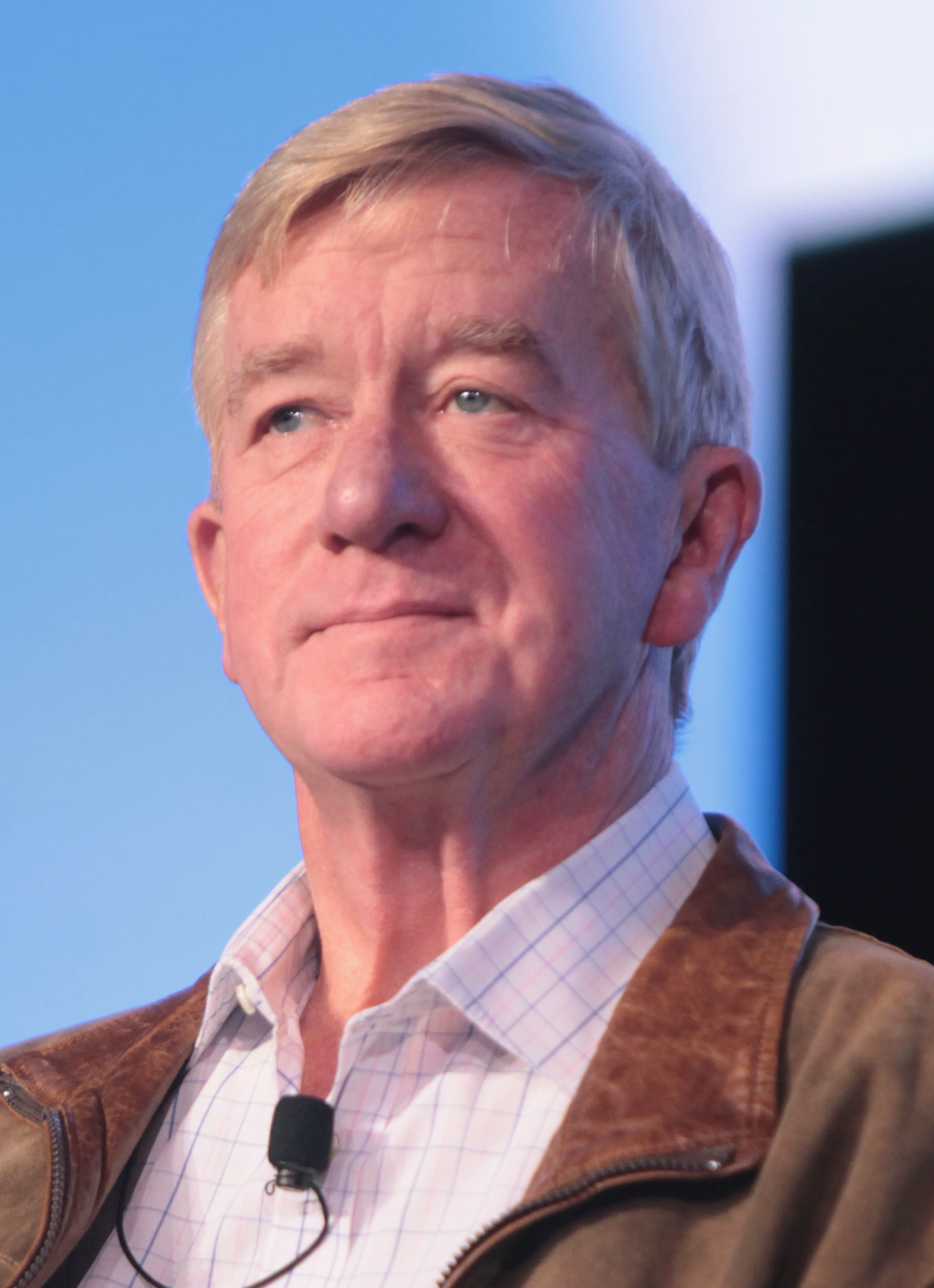
Candidate	Donald Trump	Bill Weld
Home state	Florida	Massachusetts
Delegate count	41	0
Popular vote	239,115	25,425
Percentage	86.32%	9.18%

Donald Trump
Bill Weld
No votes

The 2020 Massachusetts Republican presidential primary took place on March 3, 2020, as one of fourteen contests scheduled for Super Tuesday in the Republican Party presidential primaries for the 2020 presidential election.

== Results ==
Incumbent United States President Donald Trump was challenged by three candidates: businessman and perennial candidate Rocky De La Fuente of California, former congressman Joe Walsh of Illinois, and former governor Bill Weld of Massachusetts. Walsh withdrew from the race prior to the primary. De La Fuente was not on the initial ballot list, but he successfully petitioned to get onto the ballot following its release. Donald Trump won Massachusetts in a landslide over Former Governor Bill Weld, winning almost every town, losing only Pelham and Gosnold.

2020 Massachusetts Republican presidential primary
Candidate	Popular vote		Delegates
Candidate	Count	Percentage	Delegates
Donald Trump (incumbent)	239,115	86.32	41
Bill Weld	25,425	9.18	0
Joe Walsh (withdrawn)	3,008	1.09	0
Rocky De La Fuente	675	0.24	0
No Preference	4,385	1.58	0
Blank ballots	2,242	0.81	0
All Others	2,152	0.78	0
Total	277,002	100%	41

=== Results by county ===
2020 Massachusetts Republican primary (results per county)
County	Donald Trump		Bill Weld		Joe Walsh		Rocky De La Fuente		No Preference		Blank ballots		All Others		Total votes cast
County	Votes	%	Votes	%	Votes	%	Votes	%	Votes	%	Votes	%	Votes	%	Total votes cast
Barnstable	17,723	88.36	1,554	7.75	143	0.71	39	0.19	292	1.46	192	0.96	115	0.57	20,058
Berkshire	2,527	80.25	432	13.72	65	2.06	8	0.25	59	1.87	34	1.08	24	0.76	3,149
Bristol	20,003	89.78	1,417	6.36	239	1.07	39	0.18	277	1.24	174	0.78	132	0.59	22,281
Dukes	522	80.56	74	11.42	22	3.40	1	0.15	11	1.70	10	1.54	8	1.23	648
Essex	31,124	86.74	3,218	8.97	349	0.97	83	0.23	550	1.53	306	0.85	254	0.71	35,884
Franklin	1,886	80.67	341	14.59	30	1.28	9	0.38	42	1.80	13	0.56	17	0.73	2,338
Hampden	13,272	86.95	1,178	7.72	192	1.26	64	0.42	204	1.34	103	0.67	251	1.64	15,264
Hampshire	3,909	83.92	567	12.17	37	0.79	14	0.30	80	1.72	27	0.58	24	0.52	4,658
Middlesex	50,703	84.45	6,463	10.76	667	1.11	151	0.25	1,037	1.73	550	0.92	471	0.78	60,042
Nantucket	352	78.40	59	13.14	12	2.67	4	0.89	9	2.00	4	0.89	9	2.00	449
Norfolk	28,554	85.59	3,207	9.61	334	1.00	80	0.24	598	1.79	284	0.85	303	0.91	33,360
Plymouth	28,279	88.54	2,388	7.48	282	0.88	55	0.17	537	1.68	224	0.70	173	0.54	31,938
Suffolk	8,801	83.26	1,127	10.66	207	1.96	41	0.39	140	1.32	106	1.00	148	1.40	10,570
Worcester	31,460	86.52	3,400	9.35	429	1.18	87	0.24	549	1.51	215	0.59	223	0.61	36,363
Total	239,115	86.32	25,425	9.18	3,008	1.09	675	0.24	4,385	1.58	2,242	0.81	2,152	0.78	277,002

== See also ==
- 2020 Massachusetts Democratic presidential primary
