= 2020 West Virginia Republican presidential primary =

- June 9, 2020

35 pledged delegates to the Republican National Convention

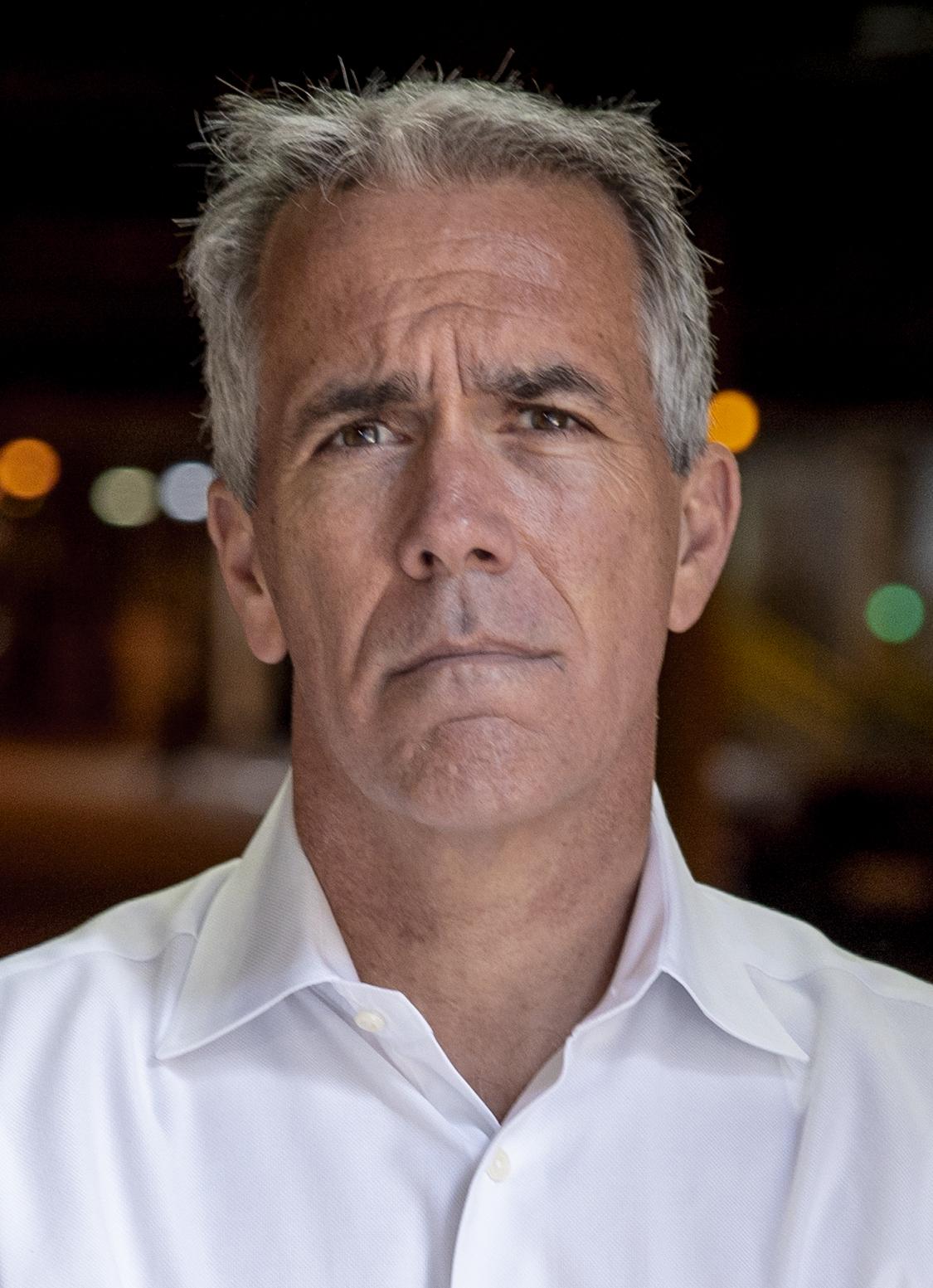
| Candidate | Donald Trump | Joe Walsh (withdrawn) |
| Home state | Florida | Illinois |
| Delegate count | 35 | — |
| Popular vote | 198,691 | 3,806 |
| Percentage | 94.39% | 1.8% |

The 2020 West Virginia Republican presidential primary was held on June 9, 2020, along with the Georgia primary on the same day. All 35 of West Virginia's delegates to the 2020 Republican National Convention were allocated according to the results.

Donald Trump won the primary and all of the state's delegates.

== Results ==
2020 West Virginia Republican presidential primary
| Candidate | Popular vote | | Pledged delegates |
| Candidate | # | % | Pledged delegates |
|---|---|---|---|
| Donald Trump (incumbent) | 198,691 | 94.39 | 35 |
| Joe Walsh (withdrawn) | 3,806 | 1.81 | 0 |
| Bill Weld (withdrawn) | 3,721 | 1.77 | 0 |
| Rocky De La Fuente | 1,537 | 0.73 | 0 |
| Bob Ely | 1,436 | 0.68 | 0 |
| Matthew Mattern | 1,315 | 0.62 | 0 |
| Total | 210,506 | 100% | 35 |

== See also ==
- 2020 United States presidential election in West Virginia
- 2020 United States presidential election
- 2020 West Virginia Democratic presidential primary
- 2020 United States elections
