= 2020 District of Columbia Republican presidential primary =

- June 2, 2020

19 pledged delegates to the Republican National Convention
Candidate	Donald Trump
Home state	Florida
Delegate count	19
Popular vote	1,559
Percentage	100%

The 2020 District of Columbia Republican presidential primary was held on June 2, 2020, along with seven other Republican presidential primaries that day. Donald Trump ran unopposed in the primary and thus won the vote and all of the district's 19 pledged delegates.

== Results ==
2020 District of Columbia Republican presidential primary
Candidate	Popular vote		Pledged delegates
Candidate	#	%	Pledged delegates
Donald Trump	1,559	100%	35
Total	1,559	100%	35
