= 2020 Illinois Republican presidential primary =

- March 17, 2020

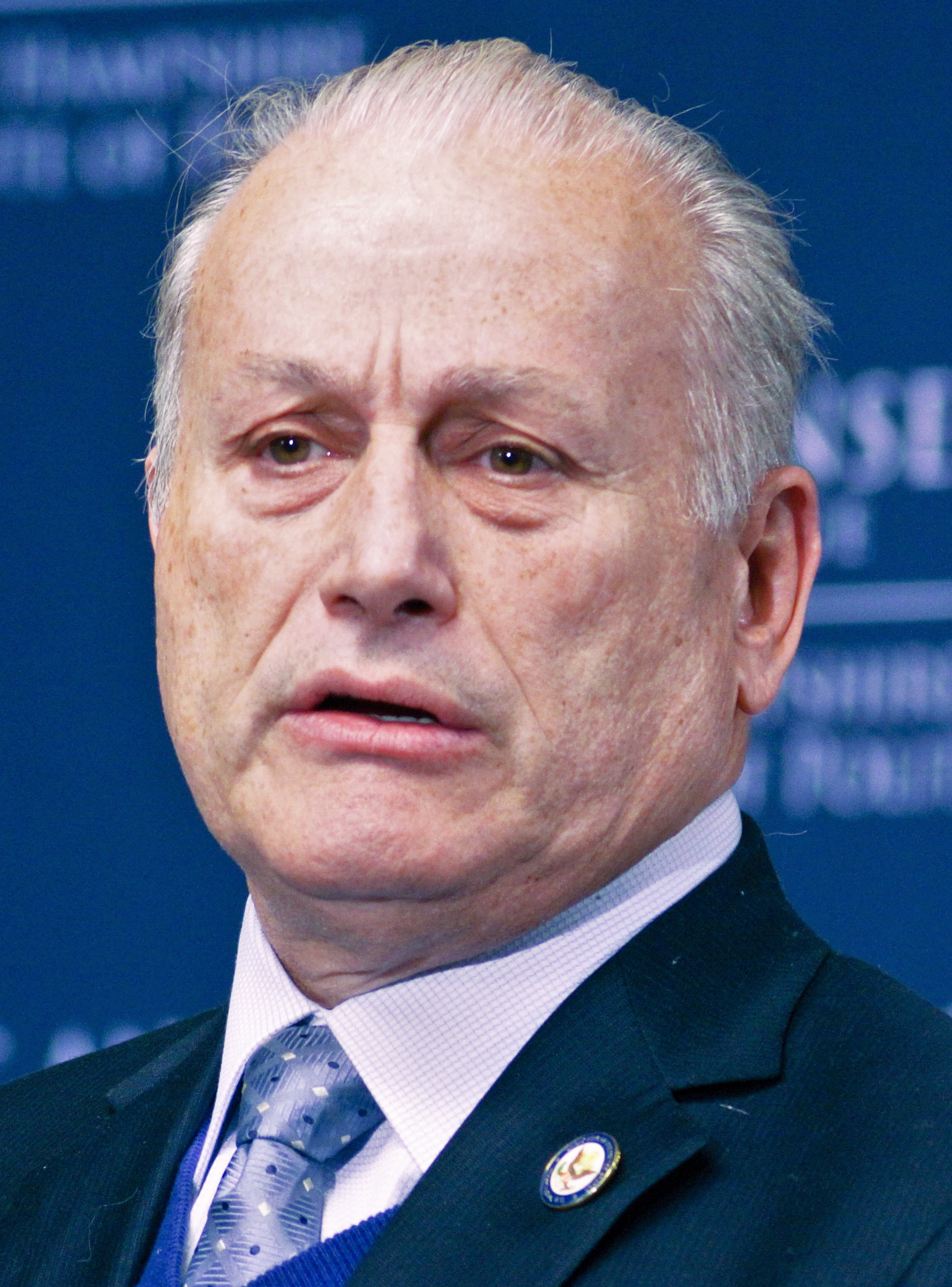
Candidate	Donald Trump	Rocky De La Fuente
Home state	Florida	California
Delegate count	67	–
Popular vote	520,956	21,833
Percentage	95.98%	4.0%

The 2020 Illinois Republican presidential primary took place on March 18, 2020, as one of three contests scheduled on that date in the Republican Party presidential primaries for the 2020 presidential election.

== Results ==
Incumbent United States President Donald Trump was challenged by businessman and perennial candidate Rocky De La Fuente of California. Trump won the state in a landslide victory over his opponent, which earned him enough delegates to secure the Republican party's nomination. Rocky De La Fuente's 4% share of the vote was his third-best performance of any state, after Delaware and Connecticut.

2020 Illinois Republican presidential primary
Candidate	Popular vote		Delegates
Candidate	Count	Percentage	Delegates
Donald Trump	520,956	96.0%	67
Rocky De La Fuente	21,833	4.0%	0
Richard Mayers write-in	11	0.0%	0
Total:	542,800	100%	67

== See also ==
- 2020 United States presidential election in Illinois
