= 2020 Idaho Republican presidential primary =

- March 10, 2020

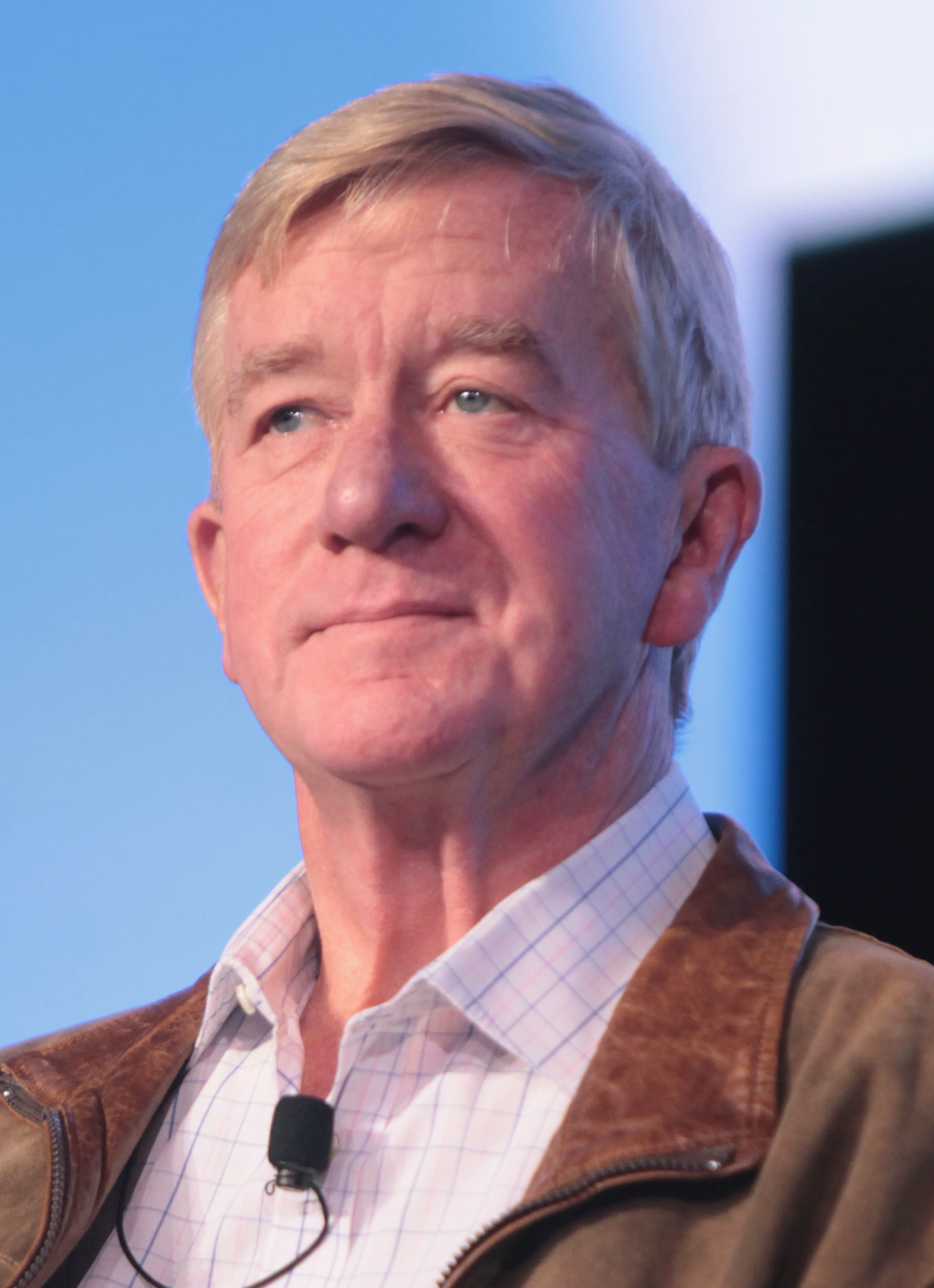
Candidate	Donald Trump	Bill Weld
Home state	Florida	Massachusetts
Delegate count	32	0
Popular vote	111,136	2,486
Percentage	94.48%	2.09%

The 2020 Idaho Republican presidential primary took place on March 10, 2020. Six candidates filed to run in the presidential primary.

== Results ==
Incumbent United States President Donald Trump was challenged by five candidates: businessman and perennial candidate Rocky De La Fuente of California, entrepreneur and investor Bob Ely of Massachusetts, entrepreneur and attorney Matthew Matern of Louisiana, former congressman Joe Walsh of Illinois, and former governor Bill Weld of Massachusetts. Walsh withdrew from the race prior to the primary.

2020 Idaho Republican presidential primary
Candidate	Votes	%	Estimated delegates
Donald Trump (incumbent)	112,373	94.46%	32
Bill Weld	2,486	2.09%	0
Joe Walsh (withdrawn)	2,341	1.97%	0
Matthew Matern	647	0.54%	0
Rocky De La Fuente	637	0.54%	0
Bob Ely	474	0.40%	0
Total	118,311	100%	32

== See also ==
- 2020 Idaho Democratic presidential primary
