= 2020 Oregon Republican presidential primary =

- May 19, 2020
Candidate	Donald Trump
Home state	Florida
Delegate count	28
Popular vote	363,785
Percentage	93.7

The 2020 Oregon Republican presidential primary took place on May 19, 2020.

== Results ==
2020 Oregon Republican presidential primary
Candidate	Votes	%	Delegates
Donald Trump (incumbent)	363,785	93.70	28
Write-ins	24,461	6.30	0
Total	388,246	100.00	28

== See also ==
- 2020 Oregon Democratic presidential primary
