= 2020 Indiana Republican presidential primary =

- June 2, 2020

58 pledged delegates to the Republican National Convention

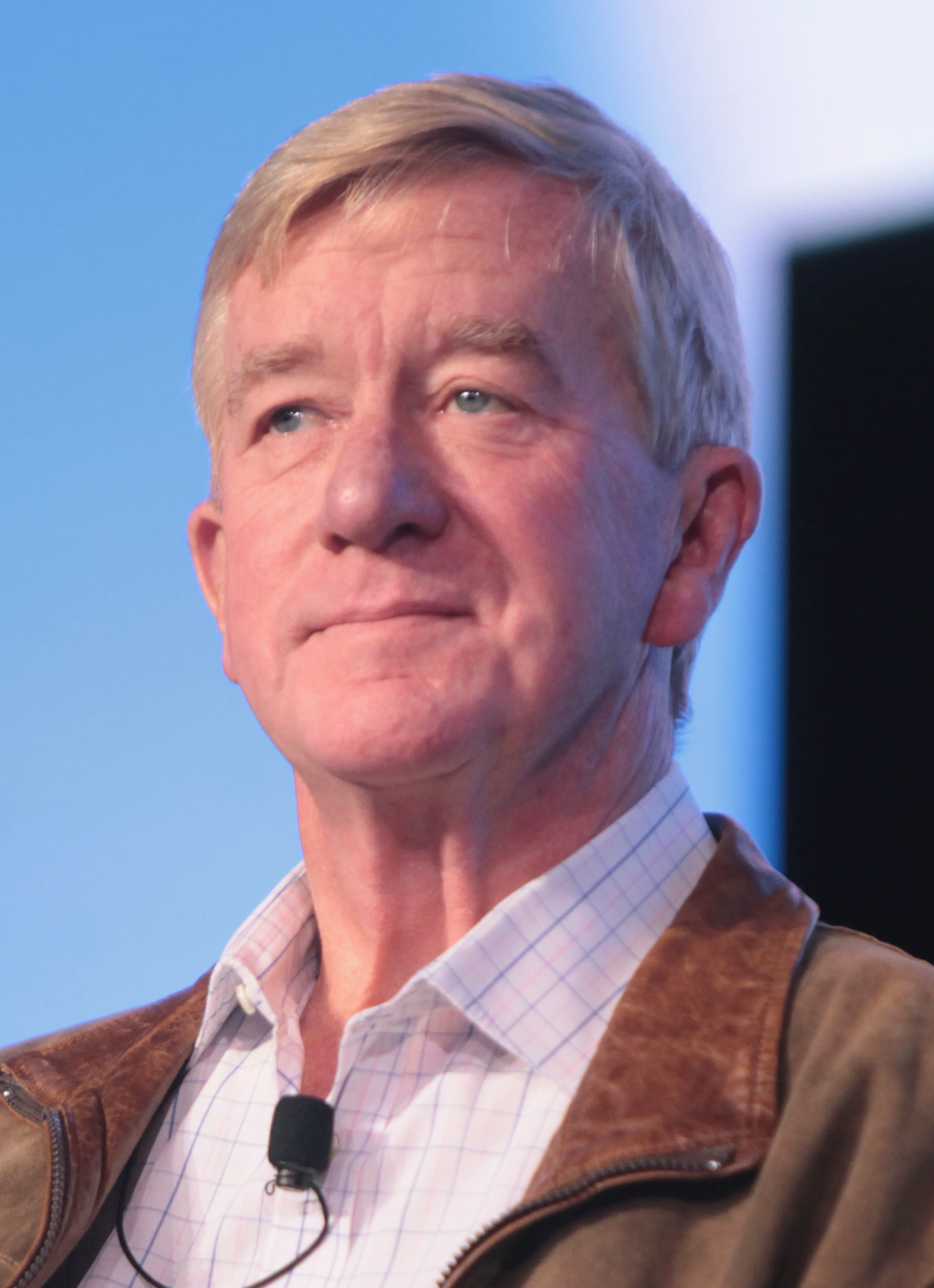
Candidate	Donald Trump	Bill Weld (withdrawn)
Home state	Florida	Massachusetts
Delegate count	58	0
Popular vote	504,726	44,520
Percentage	91.89%	8.11%

The 2020 Indiana Republican presidential primary was held on June 2, 2020, along with seven other Republican presidential primaries that day. All 58 of Indiana's delegates to the 2020 Republican National Convention were allocated according to the results.

Donald Trump won the primary and all of the state's delegates.

== Results ==
2020 Indiana Republican presidential primary
Candidate	Popular vote		Pledged delegates
Candidate	#	%	Pledged delegates
Donald Trump	504,726	91.89	58
Bill Weld (withdrawn)	44,520	8.11	0
Total	549,246	100%	58
