= 2020 Rhode Island Republican presidential primary =

- June 2, 2020

19 pledged delegates to the Republican National Convention

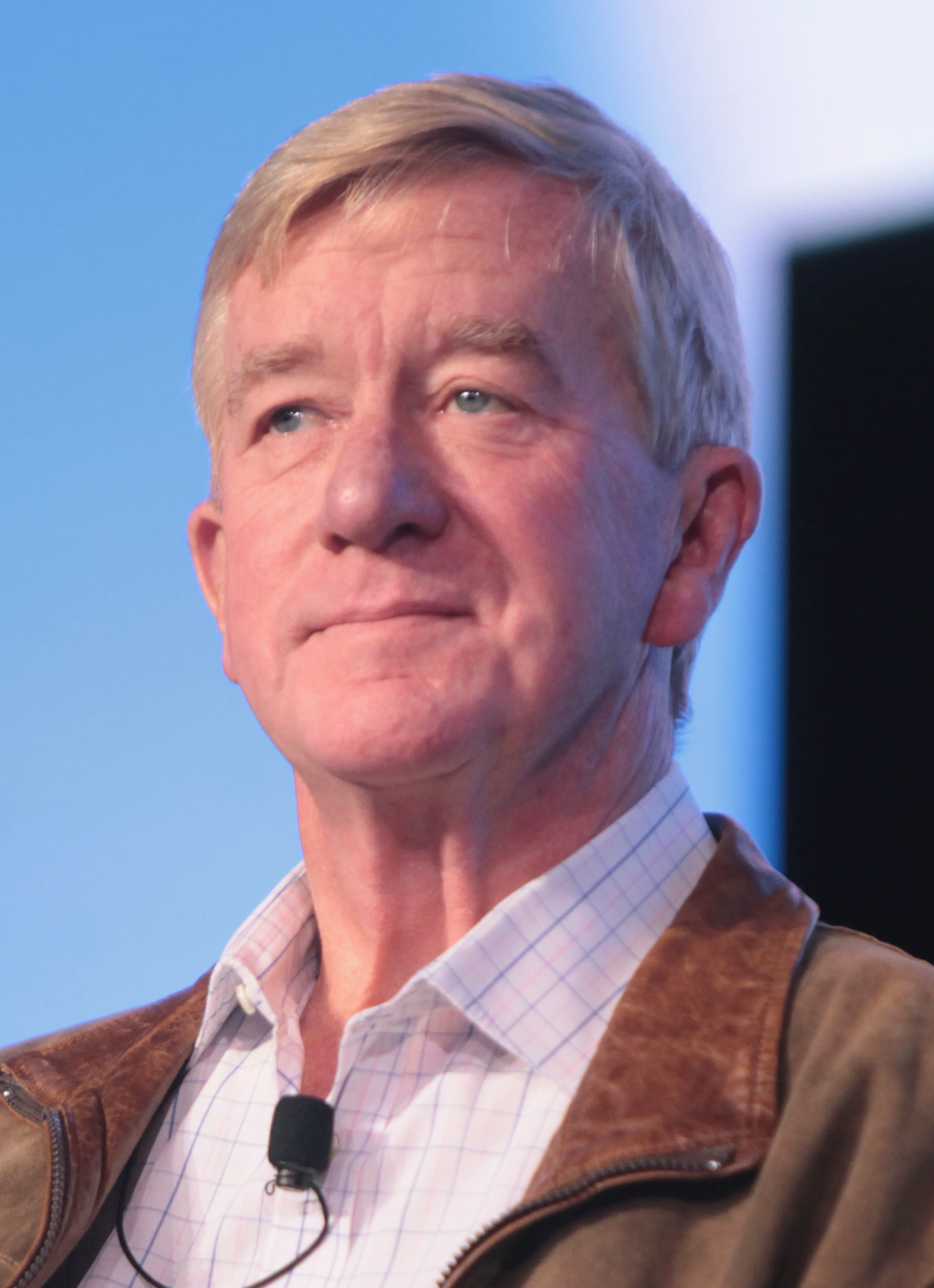
Candidate	Donald Trump	Bill Weld (withdrawn)
Home state	Florida	Massachusetts
Delegate count	19	0
Popular vote	19,176	1,214
Percentage	87.13%	5.52%

The 2020 Rhode Island Republican presidential primary was held on June 2, 2020 along with seven other Republican presidential primaries that day. All 19 of Rhode Island's delegates to the 2020 Republican National Convention were allocated according to the results.

Donald Trump won the primary and all of the state's delegates.

== Results ==
2020 Rhode Island Republican presidential primary
Candidate	Popular vote		Pledged delegates
Candidate	#	%	Pledged delegates
Donald Trump	19,176	87.13	19
Bill Weld (withdrawn)	1,214	5.52	0
Uncommitted	1,069	4.86	0
Rocky De La Fuente	182	0.83	0
Write-ins	368	1.67	0
Total	22,009	100%	19
