= 2020 California Republican presidential primary =

- March 3, 2020

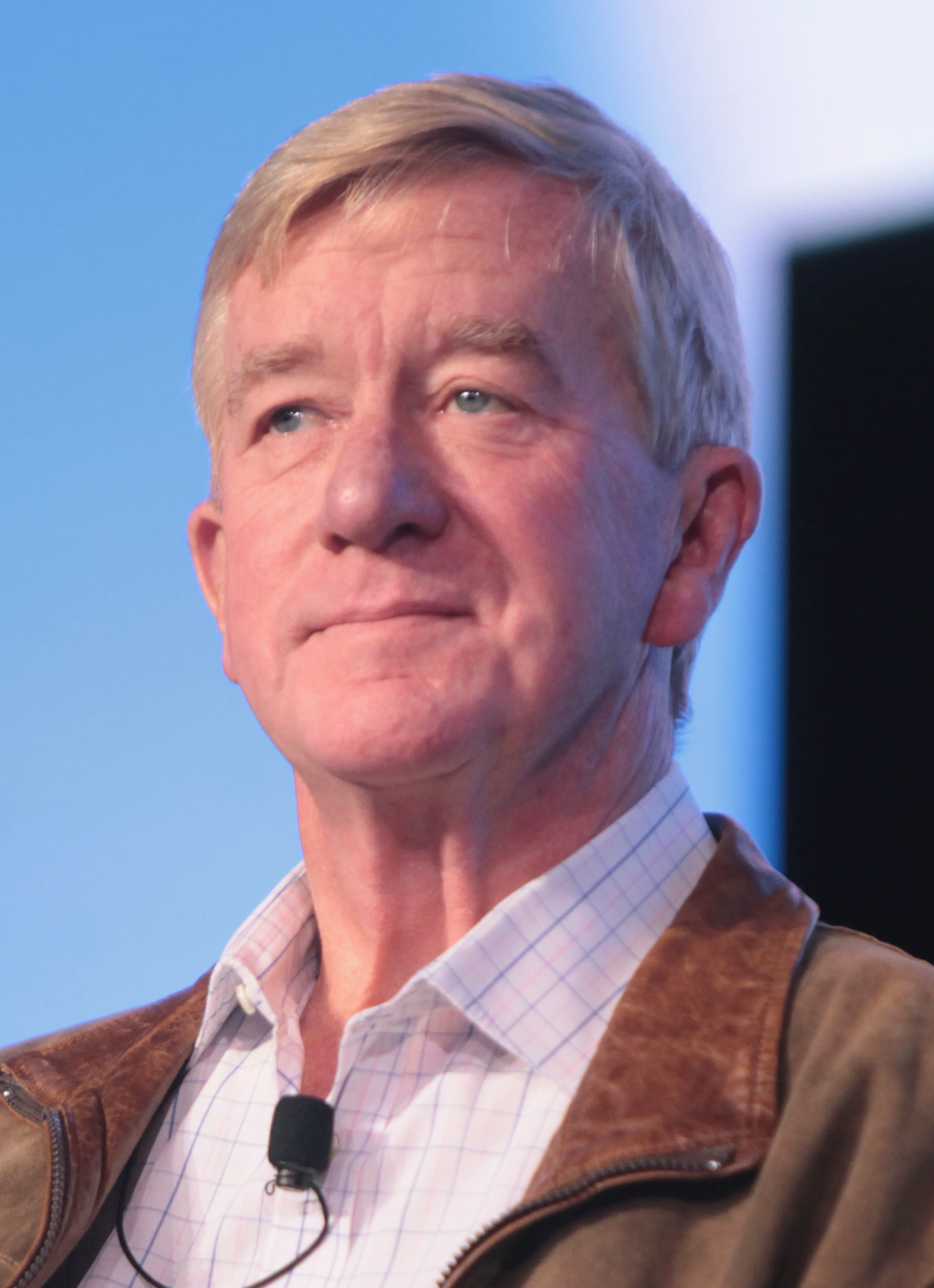
Candidate	Donald Trump	Bill Weld
Home state	Florida	Massachusetts
Delegate count	172	0
Popular vote	2,279,120	66,904
Percentage	92.21%	2.7%
- Donald Trump

The 2020 California Republican presidential primary took place on March 3, 2020.

== California primary election law ==
On July 30, 2019, California governor Gavin Newsom signed Senate Bill 27 (SB 27) into law, effective immediately, requiring that all presidential candidates release five years of tax returns in order to be eligible for the state primary. In August 2019, Trump sued the State of California, seeking to block implementation of the law SB 27, asserting that the law is unconstitutional. On September 19, 2019, U.S. District Judge Morrison C. England issued a temporary injunction blocking the law from taking effect. California is appealing; California Secretary of State Alex Padilla said: "Our elected leaders have a legal and moral obligation to be transparent with voters about potential conflicts of interest. This law is fundamental to preserving and protecting American democracy."

California's Supreme Court ruled that Senate Bill 27 could not come into effect. According to The Sacramento Bee, this means that "President Donald Trump won't have to release his tax returns to get on California's 2020 primary ballot".

== Alternative convention ==
After Governor Newsom signed the bill, the Republican state committee met in emergency session to set up an alternative convention in order to give him all their delegates should the secretary of the state bar him because of his refusal to submit his taxes.

After the supreme court's action in November 2019, plans for an alternative convention were shelved.

== Candidates ==
To qualify for ballot access, a candidate must be determined by the Secretary of State to be a generally-recognized candidate, or by circulating nomination papers.

"Generally advocated for or recognized candidate" or "recognized candidate" means an individual who has an authorized campaign committee registered with the Federal Election Commission for the office of President of the United States and submits proof of at least one of the following criteria:

- a. qualified for funding under the Federal Election Campaign Act of 1974 (52 U.S.C. Sec. 30101, et seq.)
- b. —appeared as a candidate in a national presidential debate hosted by a political party qualified to participate in a primary election, with at least two participating candidates, and publicly available for viewing by voters in more than one state during the current presidential election cycle. A "political party qualified to participate in a primary election" means any political party qualified in California, a major or minor-ballot qualified political party in another state, or a national committee of a political party recognized by the Federal Election Commission.
- c. placed or qualified for placement on a presidential primary ballot or a caucus ballot of a major or minor ballot-qualified political party in at least one other state in the current presidential election cycle.
- d. candidate or qualified to be a candidate in a caucus of a major or minor ballot-qualified political party in at least one other state in the current presidential election cycle.
- e. has the following: current presidential campaign internet website or webpage hosted by the candidate or a qualified political party, and a written request submitted on the candidate's behalf by a party qualified to participate in the primary election to the Secretary of State requesting the candidate be placed on the presidential primary ballot. §§ 6000.11, 6000.2

Among the challengers to incumbent President Donald Trump who had submitted their applications with enough qualifications were New York advertising executive Robert Ardini and Manhattan Beach attorney Matthew Matern.

== Results ==
2020 California Republican presidential primary
Candidate	Votes	%	Estimated delegates
Donald Trump	2,279,120	92.2%	172
Bill Weld	66,904	2.7%	0
Joe Walsh (withdrawn)	64,749	2.6%	0
Rocky De La Fuente	24,351	1.0%	0
Matthew John Matern	15,469	0.6%	0
Robert Ardini	12,857	0.5%	0
Zoltan Istvan	8,141	0.3%	0
Total	2,471,591	100%	

== See also ==
- 2020 California Democratic presidential primary
