= 2020 Missouri Republican presidential primary =

- March 10, 2020

Candidate	Donald Trump	Uncommitted
Home state	Florida	N/A
Delegate count	54	0
Popular vote	301,600	4,176
Percentage	96.8%	1.4%

The 2020 Missouri Republican presidential primary occurred on March 10, 2020. It used the winner-take-most system, where a candidate must have an absolute majority to take all delegates.

== Results ==
2020 Missouri Republican presidential primary
Candidate	Votes	%	Estimated delegates
Donald Trump (incumbent)	301,953	96.8%	54
Uncommitted	4,216	1.4%	0
Bill Weld	2,171	0.7%	0
Joe Walsh (withdrawn)	2,015	0.6%	0
Bob Ely	844	0.3%	0
Matthew John Matern	594	0.2%	0
Total	311,793	100%	54

== See also ==
- 2020 Missouri Democratic presidential primary
