= 2020 Arkansas Republican presidential primary =

- March 3, 2020

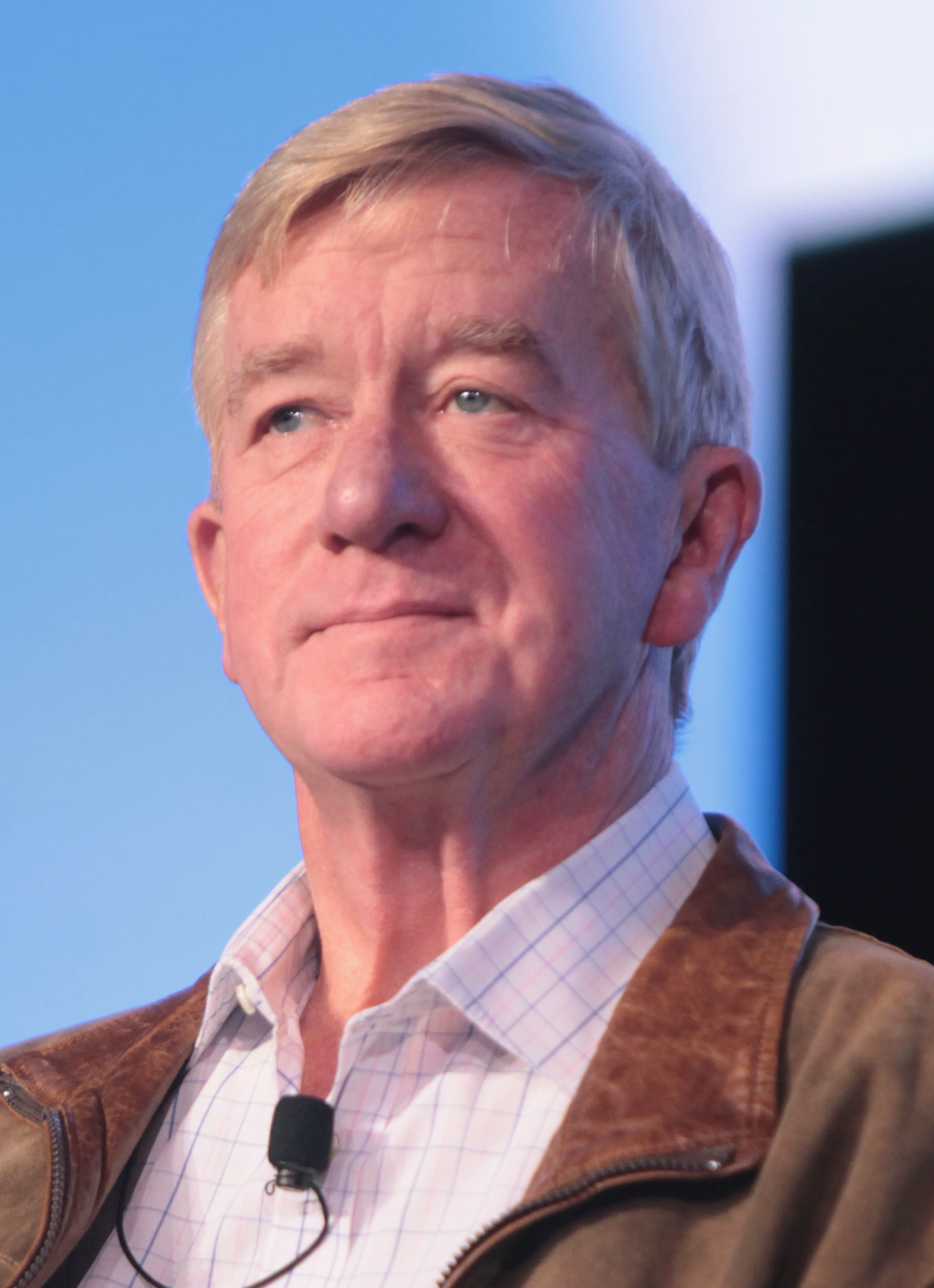
Candidate	Donald Trump	Bill Weld
Home state	Florida	Massachusetts
Delegate count	40	0
Popular vote	238,980	5,216
Percentage	97.13%	2.12%

The 2020 Arkansas Republican presidential primary took place on Super Tuesday, March 3, 2020. It used the "Winner takes most" system of allocating delegates. This system states that a candidate must receive 15% of the vote to receive any delegates statewide or by congressional district, but only if the winner gets less than 50% of the aggregate vote. Should they do so, it becomes winner-take-all.

== Results ==
The following candidates are on the ballot.

2020 Arkansas Republican presidential primary
Candidate	Popular vote		Delegates
Candidate	Count	Percentage	Delegates
Donald Trump	238,980	97.13%	40
Bill Weld	5,216	2.12%	0
Rocky De La Fuente	1,848	0.75%	0
Total	246,044	100%	40

== See also ==
- 2020 Arkansas Democratic presidential primary
