= 2020 Alabama Democratic presidential primary =

- March 3, 2020

60 Democratic National Convention delegates (52 pledged with 34 on district-level and 18 statewide; 8 unpledged) The number of pledged delegates won is determined by the popular vote

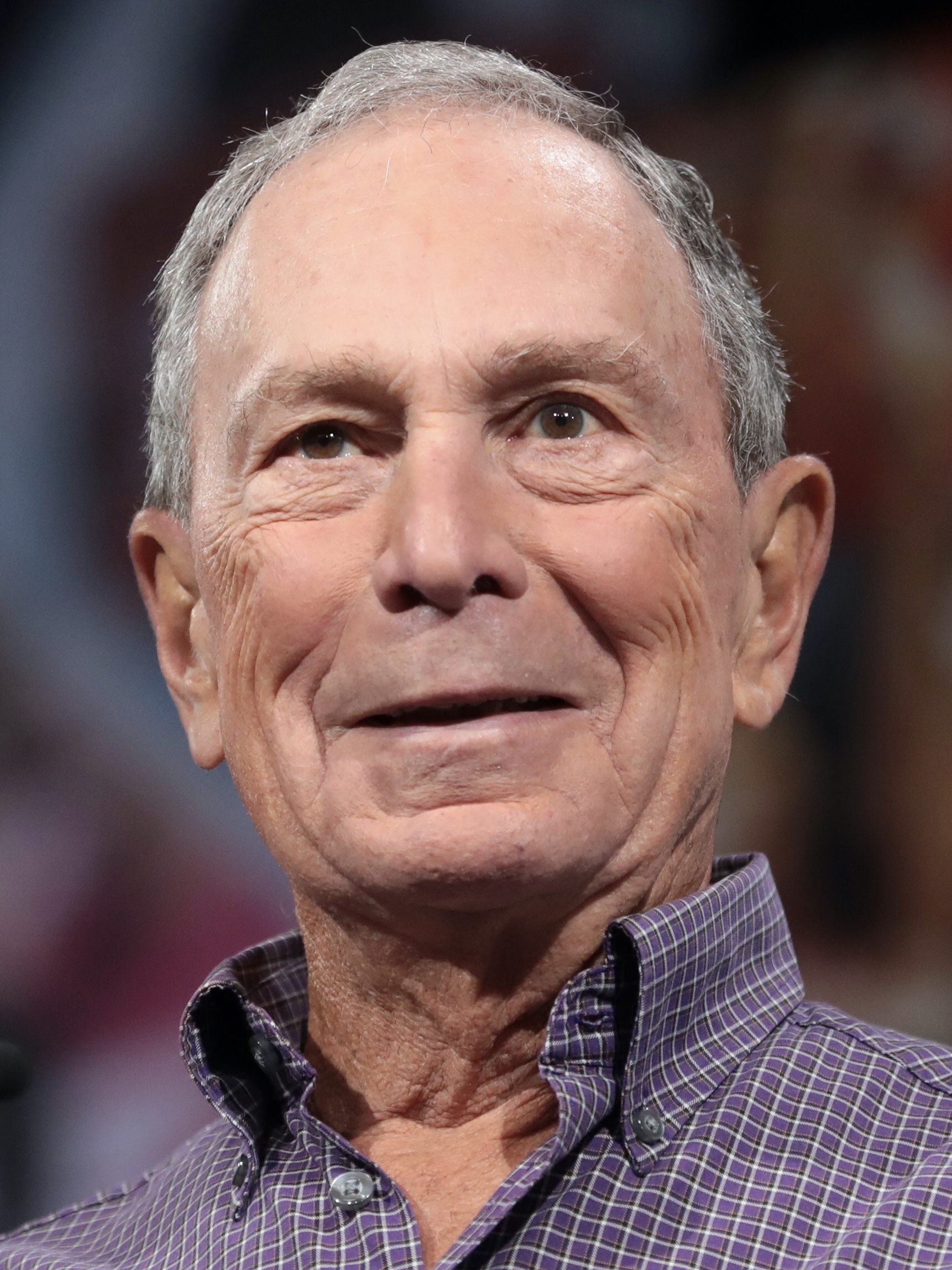

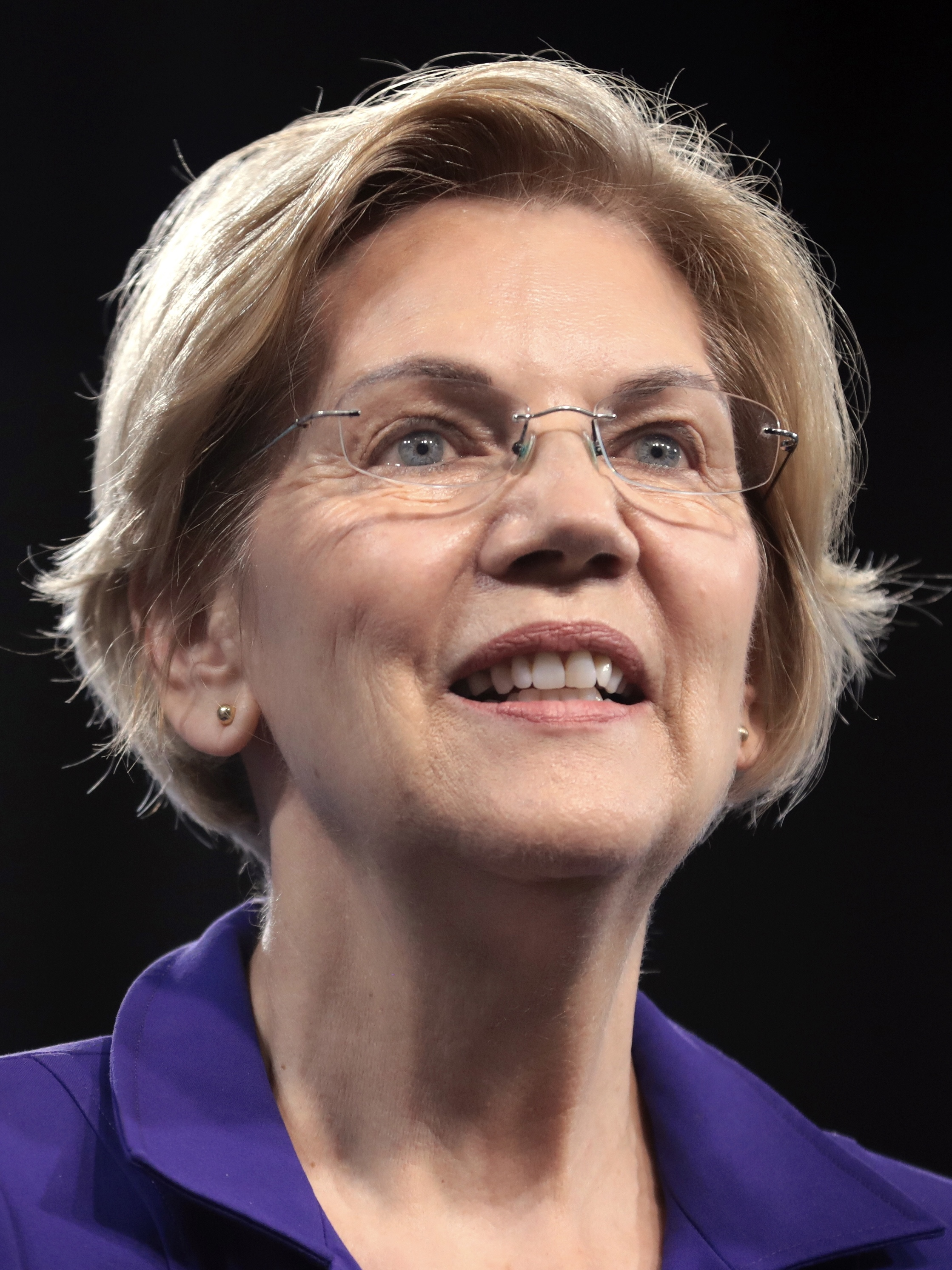
Candidate	Joe Biden	Bernie Sanders
Home state	Delaware	Vermont
Delegate count	44	8
Popular vote	286,065	74,755
Percentage	63.28%	16.54%
Candidate	Michael Bloomberg	Elizabeth Warren
Home state	New York	Massachusetts
Delegate count	0	0
Popular vote	52,750	25,847
Percentage	11.67%	5.72%

Biden
40 – 50%
50 – 60%
60 – 70%
70 – 80%
Congressional district results
Joe Biden

Pledged national convention delegates
Type	Del.
CD1	5
CD2	5
CD3	4
CD4	3
CD5	5
CD6	4
CD7	8
PLEO	7
At-large	11
Total pledged delegates	52

The 2020 Alabama Democratic presidential primary took place on March 3, 2020, as one of 15 contests scheduled on Super Tuesday in the Democratic Party primaries for the 2020 presidential election. The open primary allocated 52 pledged delegates towards the 2020 Democratic National Convention, distributed in proportion to the results of the primary, statewide and within each congressional district. The state was also given an additional 8 unpledged delegates (superdelegates), whose votes at the convention were not bound to the result of the primary.

Five candidates ran in this primary, including former vice president Joe Biden, senator Bernie Sanders from Vermont, former New York City mayor Michael Bloomberg, senator Elizabeth Warren from Massachusetts, and representative Tulsi Gabbard from Hawaii. Nine other candidates who withdrew prior to the contest were also on the ballot. Joe Biden won by an overwhelming landslide, winning every county and congressional district in the state. He received 63% of the vote and was awarded 44 delegates. Senator Sanders came in second place, with roughly 17% of the vote and 8 delegates. No other candidate received any delegates: Bloomberg missed the threshold with 12%, and Warren only received 6%. All other candidates received under 1% of the vote.

== Procedure ==
Alabama was part of 14 states and one territory holding primaries on March 3, 2020, also known as "Super Tuesday," having joined other southern states on the date after a bill signed on June 10, 2015, shifted the date.

Voting took place from 7 a.m. until 7 p.m CST. In the open primary, candidates had to meet a threshold of 15 percent at the congressional district or statewide level in order to be considered viable for delegates. The 52 pledged delegates to the 2020 Democratic National Convention were allocated proportionally on the basis of the results of the primary. Of these, between 3 and 8 were allocated to each of the state's 7 congressional districts and another 7 were allocated to party leaders and elected officials (PLEO delegates), in addition to 11 at-large delegates. The Super Tuesday primary as part of Stage I on the primary timetable received no bonus delegates, in order to disperse the primaries between more different date clusters and keep too many states from hoarding on the first shared date or on a March date in general.

Should presidential candidates have been allocated more delegates based on the results of the primary than delegate candidates presented, then supplemental delegates would be elected at caucuses on March 28, 2020. Regular national convention district delegates, whose names were electable on the primary ballot beneath the presidential candidates they were pledged for, were elected on the day of the primary and published on March 28, 2020. The state executive committee meeting was held on June 6, 2020, to vote on the 11 at-large and 7 pledged PLEO delegates for the Democratic National Convention; the meeting had been postponed from April 4, due to the COVID-19 pandemic. The delegation also included 8 unpledged PLEO delegates: 6 members of the Democratic National Committee and 2 members of Congress (senator Doug Jones and representative Terri Sewell).

== Candidates ==
The following people filed for the presidential primary and were on the ballot in Alabama:

Running

- Joe Biden
- Michael Bloomberg
- Tulsi Gabbard
- Bernie Sanders
- Elizabeth Warren

Withdrawn

- Michael Bennet (Note: Candidate withdrew after the New Hampshire primary when absentee voting had already begun.)
- Cory Booker (Note: Candidate withdrew during the first days of the absentee voting period.)
- Pete Buttigieg (Note: Candidate withdrew shortly before the primary when absentee voting had already begun.)
- Julian Castro
- John Delaney
- Amy Klobuchar
- Tom Steyer
- Marianne Williamson
- Andrew Yang

There was an uncommitted option on the ballot, as well.

== Fundraising ==
According to the Federal Election Commission, between April 1, 2019, and November 23, 2020, Joe Biden raised $2,412,420.93 from Alabama-based contributions. Bernie Sanders raised $306,101.54, Michael Bloomberg raised $212.82, Elizabeth Warren raised $129,887.99, and Tulsi Gabbard raised $19,775.81. (Note: Tulsi Gabbard's financial data for her 2020 presidential campaign is filed under the Tulsi Aloha PAC.)

== Polling ==
Polling aggregation
Source of poll aggregation	Date updated	Dates polled	Joe Biden	Bernie Sanders	Michael Bloomberg	Elizabeth Warren	Tulsi Gabbard	Other/ Undecided (Note: Calculated by taking the difference of 100% and all other candidates combined)
270 to Win	March 3, 2020	February 28 – March 2, 2020	44.5%	21.0%	18.0%	11.0%	1.0%	4.5%
RealClear Politics	March 3, 2020	Insufficient recent polling to supply an average.						
FiveThirtyEight	March 3, 2020	until March 2, 2020 (Note: FiveThirtyEight aggregates polls with a trendline regression of polls rather than a strict average of recent polls.)	40.2%	18.4%	15.9%	10.9%	0.5%	14.1%
Average			42.35%	19.7%	16.95%	10.95%	0.75%	9.3%
Alabama primary results (March 3, 2020)			63.3%	16.5%	11.7%	5.7%	0.2%	2.6%

Tabulation of individual polls of the 2020 Alabama Democratic Primary
Poll source	Date(s) administered	Sample size	Margin of error	Joe Biden	Michael Bloomberg	Cory Booker	Pete Buttigieg	Kamala Harris	Beto O'Rourke	Bernie Sanders	Elizabeth Warren	Other	Undecided
	Mar 1–2, 2020	Buttigieg and Klobuchar withdraw from the race											
Swayable	Mar 1–2, 2020	949 (LV)	± 5.0%	42%	18%	–	3%	–	–	20%	10%	8% (Note: Steyer with 2%; Klobuchar with 1%; Gabbard with 0%; "Other" with 5%)	–
Data for Progress	Feb 28 – Mar 2, 2020	237 (LV)	± 6.4%	47%	18%	–	–	–	–	22%	12%	2% (Note: Gabbard with 2%)	–
	Jan 13, 2020	Booker withdraws from the race											
	Dec 3, 2019	Harris withdraws from the race											
	Nov 1, 2019	O'Rourke withdraws from the race											
SurveyMonkey	July 2–16, 2019	257	± 7.8%	36%	–	2%	5%	13%	1%	15%	9%	10% (Note: Sestak with 3%; Bennet with 2%; de Blasio, Bullock, Delaney, Williamson, and Yang with 1%; Castro, Gabbard, Gillibrand, Gravel, Hickenlooper, Inslee, Klobuchar, Messam, Moulton, and Ryan with 0%)	–
Change Research	March 20–23, 2019	1,200	± 2.8%	42%	–	9%	3%	12%	10%	13%	6%	4% (Note: Castro, Klobuchar, Moulton, and Yang with 1%; Bennet, Bullock, Cuomo, de Blasio, Delaney, Gabbard, Gillibrand, Hickenlooper, Inslee, Messam, Swalwell, and Williamson with 0%)	–
Change Research	March 20–23, 2019	1,200	± 2.8%	–	–	14%	4%	16%	17%	27%	12%	9% (Note: Klobuchar with 2%; Castro, Delaney, Gabbard, Gillibrand, Hickenlooper, Inslee, and Yang with 1%; Messam and Williamson with 0%)	–

== Results ==
Popular vote share by county Biden—40–50% Biden—50–60% Biden—60–70% Biden—70–80%

2020 Alabama Democratic presidential primary
Candidate	Votes	%	Delegates
Joe Biden	286,065	63.28	44
Bernie Sanders	74,755	16.54	8
Michael Bloomberg	52,750	11.67	
Elizabeth Warren	25,847	5.72	
Michael Bennet (withdrawn)	2,250	0.50	
Pete Buttigieg (withdrawn)	1,416	0.31	
Tom Steyer (withdrawn)	1,048	0.23	
Tulsi Gabbard	1,038	0.23	
Amy Klobuchar (withdrawn)	907	0.20	
Andrew Yang (withdrawn)	875	0.19	
Cory Booker (withdrawn)	740	0.16	
John Delaney (withdrawn)	294	0.07	
Marianne Williamson (withdrawn)	224	0.05	
Julian Castro (withdrawn)	184	0.04	
Uncommitted	3,700	0.82	
Total	452,093	100%	52

=== Results by county ===
2020 Alabama Democratic primary (results by county)
County	Biden		Sanders		Bloomberg		Warren		Others		Uncommitted		Total votes
County	Votes	%	Votes	%	Votes	%	Votes	%	Votes	%	Votes	%	Total votes
Autauga	2,239	63.03	604	17.00	427	12.02	193	5.43	68	1.91	21	0.59	3,552
Baldwin	7,321	58.24	2,475	19.69	1,516	12.06	892	7.10	282	2.24	84	0.67	12,570
Barbour	1,899	74.97	202	7.97	287	11.33	57	2.25	71	2.80	17	0.67	2,533
Bibb	559	56.18	138	13.87	243	24.42	34	3.42	15	1.51	6	0.60	995
Blount	654	50.86	336	26.13	147	11.43	91	7.08	35	2.72	23	1.79	1,286
Bullock	1,569	70.20	149	6.67	356	15.93	44	1.97	85	3.80	32	1.43	2,235
Butler	1,451	65.92	171	7.77	507	23.03	28	1.27	32	1.45	12	0.55	2,201
Calhoun	4,855	61.42	1,506	19.05	881	11.14	457	5.78	163	2.06	43	0.54	7,905
Chambers	1,835	65.19	285	10.12	569	20.21	61	2.17	53	1.88	12	0.43	2,815
Cherokee	455	53.85	163	19.29	147	17.40	42	4.97	24	2.84	14	1.66	845
Chilton	856	62.25	231	16.80	168	12.22	63	4.58	40	2.91	17	1.24	1,375
Choctaw	1,351	59.33	216	9.49	440	19.32	30	1.32	104	4.57	136	5.97	2,277
Clarke	1,968	59.93	258	7.86	932	28.38	43	1.31	63	1.92	20	0.61	3,284
Clay	486	67.03	74	10.21	94	12.97	27	3.72	30	4.14	14	1.93	725
Cleburne	219	60.16	60	16.48	43	11.81	25	6.87	11	3.02	6	1.65	364
Coffee	1,597	63.80	433	17.30	276	11.03	118	4.71	55	2.20	24	0.96	2,503
Colbert	2,996	63.58	783	16.62	603	12.80	181	3.84	98	2.08	51	1.08	4,712
Conecuh	1,214	48.85	254	10.22	704	28.33	52	2.09	149	6.00	112	4.51	2,485
Coosa	574	65.98	99	11.38	156	17.93	21	2.41	14	1.61	6	0.69	870
Covington	856	66.36	184	14.26	166	12.87	45	3.49	30	2.33	9	0.70	1,290
Crenshaw	554	62.81	70	7.94	221	25.06	17	1.93	14	1.59	6	0.68	882
Cullman	1,262	49.86	633	25.01	317	12.52	173	6.84	82	3.24	64	2.53	2,531
Dale	1,656	68.57	401	16.60	203	8.41	86	3.56	50	2.07	19	0.79	2,415
Dallas	6,236	66.90	897	9.62	1,070	11.48	237	2.54	371	3.98	510	5.47	9,321
DeKalb	1,193	53.62	571	25.66	267	12.00	114	5.12	54	2.43	26	1.17	2,225
Elmore	3,089	64.77	737	15.45	591	12.39	259	5.43	66	1.38	27	0.57	4,769
Escambia	1,462	68.74	218	10.25	341	16.03	48	2.26	43	2.02	15	0.71	2,127
Etowah	3,749	62.14	1,048	17.37	808	13.39	258	4.28	114	1.89	56	0.93	6,033
Fayette	401	51.15	98	12.50	217	27.68	39	4.97	24	3.06	5	0.64	784
Franklin	633	57.49	222	20.16	155	14.08	38	3.45	31	2.82	22	2.00	1,101
Geneva	511	62.62	107	13.11	138	16.91	32	3.92	21	2.57	7	0.86	816
Greene	1,782	72.38	191	7.76	406	16.49	21	0.85	53	2.15	9	0.37	2,462
Hale	1,327	51.67	175	6.81	950	36.99	44	1.71	54	2.10	18	0.70	2,568
Henry	1,020	74.83	167	12.25	108	7.92	22	1.61	37	2.71	9	0.66	1,363
Houston	3,912	69.23	928	16.42	432	7.64	238	4.21	104	1.84	37	0.65	5,651
Jackson	1,039	55.56	403	21.55	267	14.28	89	4.76	49	2.62	23	1.23	1,870
Jefferson	67,575	66.44	16,149	15.88	8,729	8.58	7,311	7.19	1,529	1.50	411	0.40	101,704
Lamar	324	61.48	55	10.44	117	22.20	11	2.09	16	3.04	4	0.76	527
Lauderdale	3,568	54.83	1,547	23.77	740	11.37	470	7.22	136	2.09	46	0.71	6,507
Lawrence	1,355	65.59	256	12.39	343	16.60	68	3.29	33	1.60	11	0.53	2,066
Lee	7,369	58.81	2,609	20.82	1,070	8.54	1,218	9.72	222	1.77	43	0.34	12,531
Limestone	4,127	60.89	1,411	20.82	701	10.34	400	5.90	103	1.52	36	0.53	6,778
Lowndes	2,406	69.74%	386	11.19	433	12.55	54	1.57	120	3.48	51	1.48	3,450
Macon	3,067	67.45	481	10.58	654	14.38	166	3.65	121	2.66	58	1.28	4,547
Madison	25,916	57.54	10,487	23.28	4,113	9.13	3,622	8.04	720	1.60	181	0.40	45,039
Marengo	2,120	62.12	241	7.06	882	25.84	52	1.52	90	2.64	28	0.82	3,413
Marion	398	56.86	134	19.14	104	14.86	35	5.00	12	1.71	17	2.43	700
Marshall	1,581	52.52	777	25.81	364	12.09	190	6.31	82	2.72	16	0.53	3,010
Mobile	26,923	66.73	6,612	16.39	4,277	10.60	1,585	3.93	744	1.84	207	0.51	40,348
Monroe	1,716	69.87	205	8.35	405	16.49	38	1.55	70	2.85	22	0.90	2,456
Montgomery	23,465	67.94	4,502	13.04	4,178	12.10	1,484	4.30	629	1.82	278	0.80	34,536
Morgan	3,954	59.56	1,250	18.83	917	13.81	339	5.11	133	2.00	46	0.69	6,639
Perry	2,094	74.97	178	6.37	296	10.60	69	2.47	92	3.29	64	2.29	2,793
Pickens	1,142	52.77	196	9.06	752	34.75	29	1.34	41	1.89	4	0.18	2,164
Pike	1,786	68.32	433	16.56	219	8.38	105	4.02	57	2.18	14	0.54	2,614
Randolph	522	49.86	122	11.65	326	31.14	28	2.67	37	3.53	12	1.15	1,047
Russell	3,221	69.75	566	12.26	634	13.73	111	2.40	64	1.39	22	0.48	4,618
Shelby	9,543	56.87	3,795	22.62	1,415	8.43	1,672	9.96	283	1.69	71	0.42	16,779
St. Clair	2,268	57.40	835	21.13	457	11.57	283	7.16	83	2.10	25	0.63	3,951
Sumter	2,012	61.19	289	8.79	706	21.47	57	1.73	120	3.65	104	3.16%	3,288
Talladega	4,617	69.12	803	12.02	917	13.73	197	2.95	127	1.90	19	0.28%	6,680
Tallapoosa	1,762	65.70	302	11.26	438	16.33	83	3.09	84	3.13	13	0.48	2,682
Tuscaloosa	11,825	60.26	3,552	18.10	2,175	11.08	1,684	8.58	303	1.54	84	0.43	19,623
Walker	1,390	57.44	538	22.23	260	10.74	136	5.62	66	2.73	30	1.24	2,420
Washington	1,109	60.17	156	8.46	246	13.35	37	2.01	98	5.32	197	10.69	1,843
Wilcox	1,864	60.28	284	9.18	654	21.15	62	2.01	159	5.14	69	2.23%	3,092
Winston	266	52.36	117	23.03	75	14.76	32	6.30	13	2.56	5	0.98	508
Total	286,065	63.28	74,755	16.54	52,750	11.67	25,847	5.72	8,976	1.99	3,700	0.82	452,093

== Analysis ==
Joe Biden's victory in Alabama was near-guaranteed. Four years earlier, Hillary Clinton carried the state with 77.84% against Bernie Sanders and won every county and congressional district, a feat repeated by Biden. FiveThirtyEight, which made state-by-state predictions prior to the primaries, gave Biden a 92% chance at winning Alabama, a landslide over Sanders' 5% chance. Aggregate polling from FiveThirtyEight right before election day showed Biden up with 40.2%, Sanders at 18.4%, Bloomberg at 15.9%, Warren at 10.9%, Gabbard at 0.5%, and other/undecided 14.1%. 270toWin had Biden ahead as well with 44.5% of support, 23.5 percentage points ahead of Bernie Sanders at 21%.

The week before, Biden swept the South Carolina primary by a 28.88% margin over Sanders, reviving Biden's candidacy after crushing losses in Iowa, New Hampshire, and Nevada. Additionally, the moderate wing of the primary, consisting of former South Bend Mayor Pete Buttigieg, Senator Amy Klobuchar from Minnesota, representative Beto O'Rourke from Texas's 16th district, and Senator Kamala Harris from California coalesced behind and endorsed Biden while the progressive wing, consisting of Senators Sanders and Warren, remained fractured. Thus, right before Super Tuesday, Biden's support surged.

Biden's best performance, regionally, was in the Black Belt, a historically Democratic region due to high proportions of African Americans.

On the same day, Biden carried all of the other southern Super Tuesday states of Arkansas, North Carolina, Oklahoma, Tennessee, Texas, and Virginia, and his upset victories in Maine, Massachusetts, and Minnesota catapulted him to frontrunner status. He would go on to lose the state in the general election, but retained his resounding victories among Black voters in the Black Belt.

=== Exit polls ===
2020 Alabama Democratic presidential primary by subgroup (Edison exit polling)
Demographic subgroup	Biden	Sanders	Bloomberg	Warren	% of total vote
Total vote	63.28	16.54	11.67	5.72	97
Ideology
Liberals	55	24	11	8	54
Moderates	74	8	10	4	36
Conservatives	60	5	22	0	9
Party
Democrats	67	14	11	6	74
Republicans	–	–	–	–	3
Independents	51	24	12	7	23
Gender
Men	61	20	11	5	39
Women	65	14	12	6	61
Race/ethnicity
White	57	22	10	7	46
Black	72	10	13	4	49
Latino	–	–	–	–	3
Asian	–	–	–	–	0
Other	–	–	–	–	2
Age
18–29 years old	30	46	12	10	10
30–44 years old	54	24	9	8	23
45–64 years old	67	11	13	7	38
65 and older	78	6	12	1	28
Sexual orientation
LGBT	–	–	–	–	7
Heterosexual	64	15	12	5	93
Education
Never attended college	66	15	13	4	18
Some college education	64	19	11	3	28
Associate degree	64	14	14	5	17
Bachelor's degree	56	20	12	9	19
Postgraduate degree	67	13	7	10	18
Issue regarded as most important
Racial inequality	69	8	12	6	18
Healthcare	62	15	15	5	47
Climate change	64	26	6	3	11
Income inequality	53	26	7	10	18
Region
North	57	22	13	7	19
North Central	59	18	14	6	19
Birmingham/South Central	68	14	9	5	44
South	64	15	14	4	18
Area type
Urban	73	12	10	3	41
Suburban	66	21	5	5	20
Rural	52	19	17	8	38

== See also ==
- 2020 Alabama Republican presidential primary
