= 2020 Oklahoma Republican presidential primary =

- March 3, 2020

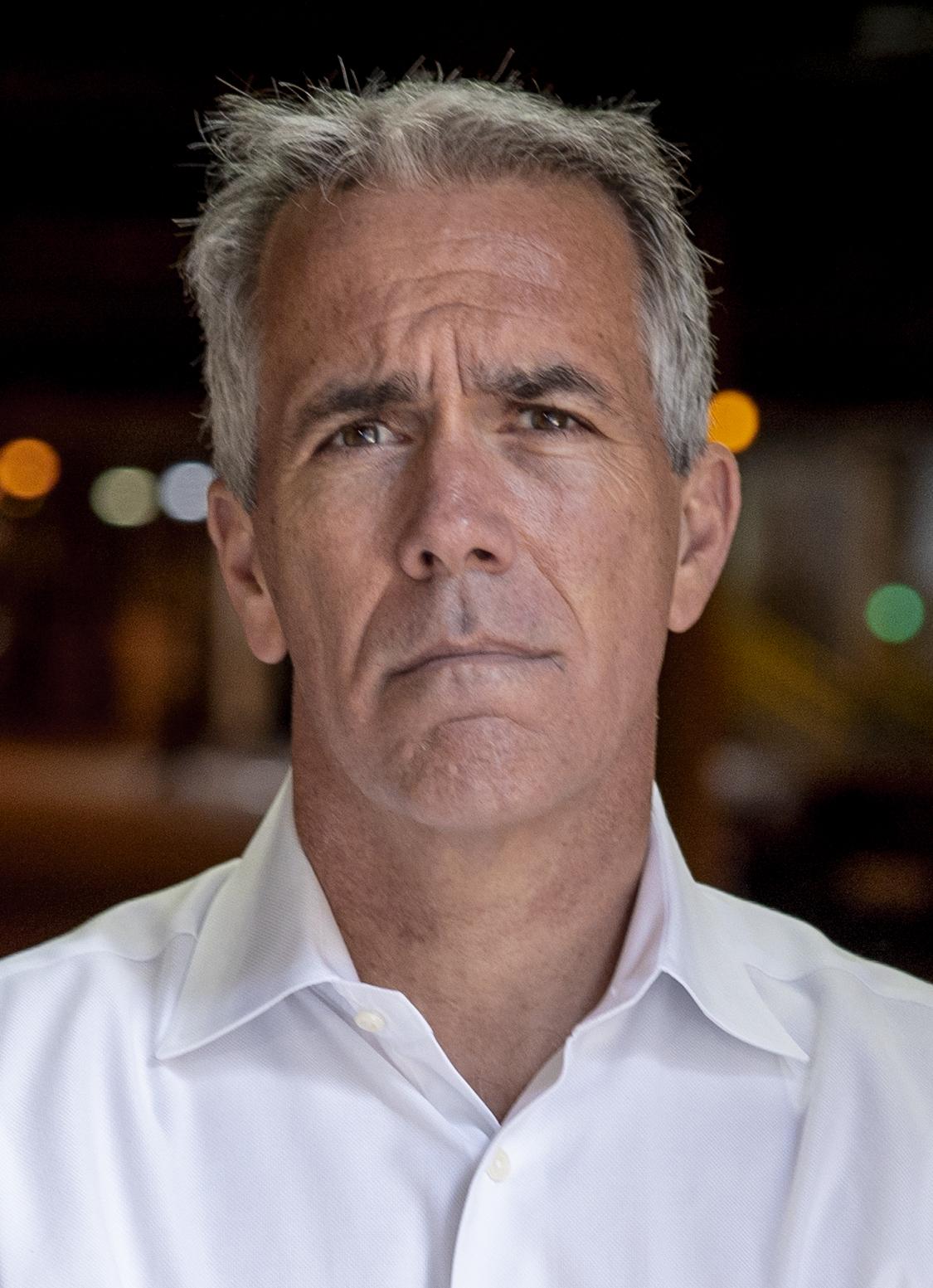
Candidate	Donald Trump	Joe Walsh (withdrawn)
Home state	Florida	Illinois
Delegate count	43	0
Popular vote	273,738	10,996
Percentage	92.60%	3.72%

The 2020 Oklahoma Republican presidential primary took place on March 3, 2020, as one of fourteen contests scheduled for Super Tuesday in the Republican Party presidential primaries for the 2020 presidential election.

Incumbent United States president Donald Trump was challenged by five candidates: businessman and perennial candidate Rocky De La Fuente of California, entrepreneur and investor Bob Ely of Massachusetts, entrepreneur and attorney Matthew Matern of Louisiana, transhumanist activist Zoltan Istvan of California, and former congressman Joe Walsh of Illinois. Oklahoma was the only contested Super Tuesday state where former governor Bill Weld of Massachusetts was not on the ballot. Walsh withdrew from the race prior to the primary.

== Results ==
Trump won the state in a landslide victory against his five opponents.

2020 Oklahoma Republican presidential primary
Candidate	Popular vote		Delegates
Candidate	Count	Percentage	Delegates
Donald Trump (incumbent)	273,738	92.60%	43
Joe Walsh (withdrawn)	10,996	3.72%	0
Matthew Matern	3,810	1.29%	0
Bob Ely	3,294	1.11%	0
Rocky De La Fuente	2,466	0.83%	0
Zoltan Istvan	1,297	0.44%	0
Total	295,601	100%	43

=== Results by county ===
2020 Oklahoma Republican primary (results per county)
County	Donald Trump		Joe Walsh		Matthew Matern		Bob Ely		Rocky De La Fuente		Zoltan Istvan		Total votes cast
County	Votes	%	Votes	%	Votes	%	Votes	%	Votes	%	Votes	%	Total votes cast
Adair	1,164	95.41	32	2.62	10	0.82	9	0.74	4	0.33	1	0.08	1,220
Alfalfa	762	95.85	15	1.89	8	1.01	6	0.75	4	0.50	0	0	795
Atoka	715	98.62	6	0.83	1	0.14	2	0.28	0	0	1	0.14	725
Beaver	736	96.84	10	1.32	5	0.66	6	0.79	2	0.26	1	0.13	760
Beckham	1,512	97.86	16	1.04	7	0.45	4	0.26	5	0.32	1	0.06	1,545
Blaine	1,117	95.63	35	3.00	5	0.43	9	0.77	2	0.17	0	0	1,168
Bryan	2,177	97.54	37	1.66	7	0.31	3	0.13	2	0.09	6	0.27	2,232
Caddo	1,481	94.75	44	2.82	10	0.64	13	0.83	7	0.45	8	0.51	1,563
Canadian	12,667	92.78	475	3.48	179	1.31	178	1.30	110	0.81	44	0.32	13,653
Carter	2,945	96.81	51	1.68	15	0.49	13	0.43	9	0.30	9	0.30	3,042
Cherokee	2,126	94.28	72	3.19	23	1.02	15	0.67	13	0.58	6	0.27	2,255
Choctaw	737	98.93	3	0.40	2	0.27	1	0.13	1	0.13	1	0.13	745
Cimarron	490	98.00	3	0.60	1	0.20	0	0	5	1.00	1	0.20	500
Cleveland	19,753	89.88	1,093	4.97	387	1.76	340	1.55	271	1.23	132	0.60	21,976
Coal	214	98.17	1	0.46	0	0	2	0.92	1	0.46	0	0	218
Comanche	4,474	93.21	162	3.38	72	1.50	33	0.69	44	0.92	15	0.31	4,800
Cotton	560	97.90	5	0.87	2	0.35	1	0.17	4	0.70	0	0	572
Craig	1,015	95.66	26	2.45	5	0.47	5	0.47	7	0.66	3	0.28	1,061
Creek	7,131	95.05	197	2.63	67	0.89	59	0.79	32	0.43	16	0.21	7,502
Custer	2,243	95.41	58	2.47	21	0.89	10	0.43	11	0.47	8	0.34	2,351
Delaware	3,419	96.20	75	2.11	28	0.79	20	0.56	8	0.23	4	0.11	3,554
Dewey	793	98.39	6	0.74	3	0.37	2	0.25	2	0.25	0	0	806
Ellis	790	96.34	19	2.32	7	0.85	2	0.24	1	0.12	1	0.12	820
Garfield	5,594	94.08	164	2.76	78	1.31	67	1.13	31	0.52	12	0.20	5,946
Garvin	2,192	97.16	42	1.86	8	0.35	7	0.31	2	0.09	5	0.22	2,256
Grady	4,996	95.91	114	2.19	31	0.60	32	0.61	27	0.52	9	0.17	5,209
Grant	652	94.08	21	3.03	6	0.87	11	1.59	2	0.29	1	0.14	693
Greer	270	95.41	8	2.83	2	0.71	0	0	1	0.35	2	0.71	283
Harmon	180	98.90	2	1.10	0	0	0	0	0	0	0	0	182
Harper	535	96.92	9	1.63	1	0.18	1	0.18	3	0.54	3	0.54	552
Haskell	788	99.75	1	0.13	1	0.13	0	0	0	0	0	0	790
Hughes	766	96.35	18	2.26	2	0.25	2	0.25	4	0.50	3	0.38	795
Jackson	1,542	97.41	25	1.58	9	0.57	2	0.13	2	0.13	3	0.19	1,583
Jefferson	359	98.09	4	1.09	0	0	1	0.27	2	0.55	0	0	366
Johnston	530	97.61	6	1.10	4	0.74	2	0.37	1	0.18	0	0	543
Kay	4,065	92.74	193	4.40	46	1.05	39	0.89	26	0.59	14	0.32	4,383
Kingfisher	2,116	96.01	43	1.95	16	0.73	13	0.59	6	0.27	10	0.45	2,204
Kiowa	597	96.60	14	2.27	3	0.49	3	0.49	1	0.16	0	0	618
Latimer	573	98.79	4	0.69	0	0	0	0	3	0.52	0	0	580
Le Flore	2,579	98.32	21	0.80	11	0.42	5	0.19	5	0.19	2	0.08	2,623
Lincoln	3,269	95.78	81	2.37	32	0.94	12	0.35	10	0.29	9	0.26	3,413
Logan	4,014	94.29	123	2.89	51	1.20	35	0.82	22	0.52	12	0.28	4,257
Love	551	98.04	6	1.07	2	0.36	2	0.36	0	0	1	0.18	562
Major	1,219	95.91	20	1.57	15	1.18	9	0.71	4	0.31	4	0.31	1,271
Marshall	945	97.02	15	1.54	10	1.03	1	0.10	2	0.21	1	0.10	974
Mayes	3,587	95.88	73	1.95	35	0.94	24	0.64	14	0.37	8	0.21	3,741
McClain	3,985	95.93	102	2.46	24	0.58	22	0.53	14	0.34	7	0.17	4,154
McCurtain	1,724	99.65	3	0.17	3	0.17	0	0	0	0	0	0	1,730
McIntosh	1,135	97.01	20	1.71	7	0.60	6	0.51	2	0.17	0	0	1,170
Murray	870	97.64	14	1.57	3	0.34	1	0.11	3	0.34	0	0	891
Muskogee	3,711	95.01	103	2.64	36	0.92	26	0.67	19	0.49	11	0.28	3,906
Noble	1,170	93.67	46	3.68	12	0.96	10	0.80	9	0.72	2	0.16	1,249
Nowata	954	95.30	21	2.10	10	1.00	7	0.70	5	0.50	4	0.40	1,001
Okfuskee	723	96.02	11	1.46	6	0.80	6	0.80	4	0.53	3	0.40	753
Oklahoma	45,370	88.20	3,077	5.98	954	1.85	829	1.61	777	1.51	430	0.84	51,437
Okmulgee	2,213	96.39	36	1.57	15	0.65	15	0.65	11	0.48	6	0.26	2,296
Osage	3,745	94.07	123	3.09	36	0.90	40	1.00	27	0.68	10	0.25	3,981
Ottawa	1,747	96.68	35	1.94	13	0.72	10	0.55	1	0.06	1	0.06	1,807
Pawnee	1,423	96.54	28	1.90	9	0.61	6	0.41	6	0.41	2	0.14	1,474
Payne	4,933	88.56	380	6.82	82	1.47	88	1.58	56	1.01	31	0.56	5,570
Pittsburg	2,623	97.11	40	1.48	13	0.48	13	0.48	9	0.33	3	0.11	2,701
Pontotoc	2,008	94.90	46	2.17	20	0.95	18	0.85	19	0.90	5	0.24	2,116
Pottawatomie	5,039	94.91	141	2.66	58	1.09	38	0.72	22	0.41	11	0.21	5,309
Pushmataha	565	98.95	4	0.70	0	0	0	0	2	0.35	0	0	571
Roger Mills	434	97.53	9	2.02	1	0.22	1	0.22	0	0	0	0	445
Rogers	9,260	94.82	236	2.42	121	1.24	96	0.98	38	0.39	15	0.15	9,766
Seminole	1,459	96.37	32	2.11	8	0.53	2	0.13	8	0.53	5	0.33	1,514
Sequoyah	2,056	97.49	30	1.42	5	0.24	7	0.33	8	0.38	3	0.14	2,109
Stephens	3,933	96.75	70	1.72	21	0.52	25	0.62	12	0.30	4	0.10	4,065
Texas	1,589	96.77	19	1.16	9	0.55	9	0.55	12	0.73	4	0.24	1,642
Tillman	482	96.79	11	2.21	1	0.20	3	0.60	1	0.20	0	0	498
Tulsa	43,004	89.41	2,450	5.09	910	1.89	830	1.73	578	1.20	326	0.68	48,098
Wagoner	6,983	95.37	150	2.05	78	1.07	61	0.83	31	0.42	19	0.26	7,322
Washington	5,450	91.44	231	3.88	93	1.56	95	1.59	64	1.07	27	0.45	5,960
Washita	953	96.95	17	1.73	4	0.41	5	0.51	1	0.10	3	0.31	983
Woods	972	94.83	23	2.24	7	0.68	15	1.46	4	0.39	4	0.39	1,025
Woodward	2,285	96.37	40	1.69	23	0.97	9	0.38	10	0.42	4	0.17	2,371
Total	273,738	92.60	10,996	3.72	3,810	1.29	3,294	1.11	2,466	0.83	1,297	0.44	295,601

== See also ==
- 2020 Oklahoma Democratic presidential primary
