= 2020 Alabama Republican presidential primary =

- March 3, 2020

Candidate	Donald Trump	Uncommitted
Home state	Florida	N/A
Delegate count	50	0
Popular vote	696,832	16,378
Percentage	96.22%	2.27%
- Donald Trump

The 2020 Alabama Republican presidential primary took place in Alabama on March 3, 2020, as one of 14 contests scheduled on Super Tuesday in the 2020 Republican Party presidential primaries for the 2020 United States presidential election. The open primary allocated 50 pledged delegates towards the Republican National Convention, distributed with the "winner take most" system of allocating delegates. This system states that a candidate must receive 20% of the vote to receive any delegates statewide or by congressional district, but only if the winner gets less than 50% of the aggregate vote. Should they receive more than 50% of the vote statewide or by congressional district, it becomes winner-take-all.

Only two candidates ran in this primary: incumbent President Donald Trump, whose sole challenger was former Massachusetts Governor Bill Weld. As typical with primary challenges to incumbent presidents, Trump practically ran unopposed, receiving 96.22% of the vote and all 50 delegates. He also carried every single county and congressional district. Weld received a mere 1.52% of the vote, and uncommitted ballots comprised the remaining 2.27% of the vote.

The election corresponded with the highly competitive Republican primary for the 2020 United States Senate election in Alabama, which likely boosted turnout.

== Procedure ==
Alabama is one of 14 states holding primaries on March 3, 2020, also known as "Super Tuesday," having joined other southern states on the date after a bill on June 10, 2015, shifted the date.

Delegates had to file a Declaration of Candidacy by November 8, 2019, in which they bind themselves to a presidential candidate. Delegates cannot vote contrary to their pledged vote unless they run either in the congressional district wherein they vote or for the at-large delegation, but not both. National Convention District Alternate delegates may be elected by the Congressional District Committee, while at-large alternates are elected by the Republican Executive Committee.

Voting is expected to take place from 7 a.m. until 7 p.m. There are 21 delegates allocated based on the results in each congressional district. In the open primary, if a candidate receives a majority of the vote or if only one candidate receives 20% or more of the vote, they're awarded all three of the congressional district's delegates. If no candidate does so, the first-place candidate receives 2 district delegates and the second-place candidate receives 1. If no candidate receives over 20% of the vote, the three district delegates are awarded proportionally to each contender. Of the 50 pledged delegates, 3 are allocated to each congressional district, 10 to at-large delegates, and another 3 are allocated to pledged party leaders and elected officials (PLEO delegates). 16 bonus delegates were allocated as Alabama shares a primary date with numerous other states on Super Tuesday.

The 47 pledged delegates Alabama sent to the national convention were joined by 3 pledged PLEO delegates, consisting of the National Committeeman, National Committeewoman, and chairman of the Alabama Republican Party.

== Candidates ==
The following people filed for the Republican presidential primary and were on the ballot in Alabama:

- Donald Trump
- Bill Weld

There was also the option of casting an uncommitted ballot, which would not be pledged to any candidate.

== Fundraising ==
According to the Federal Election Commission, between April 1, 2019, and November 23, 2020, Donald Trump raised $5,732,810.44 and Bill Weld raised $3,062.20 from Alabama-based contributors.

== Results ==
Former Massachusetts Governor Bill Weld challenged incumbent president Donald Trump in the Republican primary in Alabama. Trump received 96.22% of the vote and all 50 delegates, while Weld received only 1.52% of the vote. Uncommitted votes made up the other 2.27%.

2020 Alabama Republican presidential primary
Candidate	Popular vote		Delegates
Candidate	Count	Percentage	Delegates
Donald Trump (incumbent)	695,470	96.22%	50
Bill Weld	10,962	1.52%	0
Uncommitted	16,378	2.27%	0
Total	722,809	100%	50

=== Results by county ===
2020 Alabama Republican primary (results per county)							Total votes cast
County	Donald Trump		Bill Weld		Uncommitted		Total votes cast
County	Votes	%	Votes	%	Votes	%	Total votes cast
Autauga	9,619	96.14%	140	1.40%	246	2.46%	10,005
Baldwin	39,089	95.78%	670	1.64%	1,052	2.58%	40,811
Barbour	2,739	98.56%	17	0.61%	23	0.83%	2,779
Bibb	3,970	97.95%	32	0.79%	51	1.26%	4,053
Blount	12,819	98.04%	107	0.82%	149	1.14%	13,075
Bullock	420	98.13%	1	0.23%	7	1.64%	428
Butler	3,391	97.00%	40	1.14%	65	1.86%	3,496
Calhoun	16,539	97.43%	162	0.95%	275	1.62%	16,976
Chambers	4,093	97.13%	38	0.90%	83	1.97%	4,214
Cherokee	5,520	96.30%	94	1.64%	118	2.06%	5,732
Chilton	8,951	98.29%	75	0.82%	81	0.89%	9,107
Choctaw	1,632	98.85%	12	0.73%	7	0.42%	1,651
Clarke	4,228	98.01%	36	0.83%	50	1.16%	4,314
Clay	3,836	96.65%	53	1.34%	80	2.02%	3,969
Cleburne	3,193	97.685	23	0.70%	53	1.62%	3,269
Coffee	9,270	96.86%	123	1.29%	178	1.86%	9,571
Colbert	8,598	97.13%	101	1.14%	153	1.73%	8,852
Conecuh	1,344	98.53%	5	0.37%	15	1.10%	1,364
Coosa	2,064	96.49%	27	1.26%	48	2.24%	2,139
Covington	7,995	97.69%	69	0.84%	120	1.47%	8,184
Crenshaw	2,381	97.82%	15	0.62%	38	1.56%	2,434
Cullman	21,160	97.41%	224	1.03%	338	1.56%	21,722
Dale	7,836	97.14%	91	1.13%	140	1.74%	8,067
Dallas	985	98.30%	6	0.60%	11	1.10%	1,002
DeKalb	11,678	98.09%	82	0.69%	145	1.22%	11,905
Elmore	14,977	96.79%	189	1.22%	308	1.99%	15,474
Escambia	5,131	97.86%	32	0.61%	80	1.53%	5,243
Etowah	16,639	96.51%	212	1.23%	389	2.26%	17,240
Fayette	4,460	97.83%	42	0.92%	57	1.25%	4,559
Franklin	5,370	96.31%	78	1.40%	128	2.30%	5,576
Geneva	6,096	97.54%	52	0.83%	102	1.63%	6,250
Greene	419	98.59%	4	0.94%	2	0.47%	425
Hale	1,446	98.43%	11	0.75%	12	0.82%	1,469
Henry	3,530	98.03%	20	0.56%	51	1.42%	3,601
Houston	17,965	96.46%	239	1.28%	421	2.26%	18,625
Jackson	9,658	95.33%	162	1.60%	311	3.07%	10,131
Jefferson	65,177	95.15%	1,241	1.81%	2,080	3.04%	68,498
Lamar	3,143	98.65%	16	0.50%	27	0.85%	3,186
Lauderdale	15,572	95.31%	282	1.73%	484	2.96%	16,338
Lawrence	5,838	97.51%	51	0.85%	98	1.64%	5,987
Lee	14,179	95.01%	299	2.00%	445	2.98%	14,923
Limestone	15,565	96.15%	277	1.71%	346	2.14%	16,188
Lowndes	653	98.64%	4	0.60%	5	0.76%	662
Macon	514	98.47%	3	0.57%	5	0.96%	522
Madison	46,823	92.50%	1,817	3.59%	1,982	3.92%	50,622
Marengo	2,754	98.64%	8	0.29%	30	1.07%	2,792
Marion	6,285	98.00%	48	0.75%	80	1.25%	6,413
Marshall	15,864	97.62%	155	0.95%	231	1.42%	16,250
Mobile	46,897	95.79%	813	1.66%	1,249	2.55%	48,959
Monroe	3,599	98.33%	23	0.63%	38	1.04%	3,660
Montgomery	17,214	94.56%	394	2.16%	597	3.28%	18,205
Morgan	20,944	95.68%	429	1.96%	516	2.36%	21,889
Perry	594	97.06%	3	0.49%	15	2.45%	612
Pickens	2,970	98.64%	15	0.50%	26	0.86%	3,011
Pike	4,047	96.68%	64	1.53%	75	1.79%	4,186
Randolph	4,742	97.11%	59	1.21%	82	1.68%	4,883
Russell	3,061	97.86%	19	0.61%	48	1.53%	3,128
Shelby	38,474	95.63%	678	1.69%	1,081	2.69%	40,233
St. Clair	17,154	97.89%	147	0.84%	223	1.27%	17,524
Sumter	288	95.36%	4	1.32%	10	3.31%	302
Talladega	11,363	97.60%	107	0.92%	172	1.48%	11,642
Tallapoosa	7,690	97.24%	84	1.06%	134	1.69%	7,908
Tuscaloosa	22,619	96.37%	331	1.41%	521	2.22%	23,471
Walker	15,091	96.21%	252	1.61%	343	2.19%	15,686
Washington	2,635	99.32%	11	0.41%	7	0.26%	2,653
Wilcox	701	99.01%	3	0.42%	4	0.56%	708
Winston	5,341	97.66%	57	1.04%	71	1.30%	5,469
Total	696,832	96.22%	10,978	1.52%	16,412	2.27%	724,222

=== Results by congressional district ===
2020 Alabama Republican primary (estimated results per congressional district)
District	Donald Trump			Bill Weld			Uncommitted			Total votes cast
District	Votes	%	Delegates	Votes	%	Delegates	Votes	%	Delegates	Total votes cast
1st	98,267	96.10%	3	1,559	1.52%	0	2,432	2.38%	0	102,258
2nd	99,625	96.74%	3	1,271	1.23%	0	2,088	2.03%	0	102,984
3rd	93,161	96.98%	3	1,126	1.17%	0	1,777	1.85%	0	96,064
4th	126,916	97.21%	3	1,423	1.09%	0	2,222	1.70%	0	130,561
5th	126,214	94.49%	3	3,200	2.40%	0	4,160	3.11%	0	133,574
6th	100,387	96.07%	3	1,582	1.51%	0	2,525	2.42%	0	104,494
7th	64,301	96.15%	3	978	1.46%	0	1,595	2.39%	0	66,874
At-large (Note: These do not match the added totals of the results in each congressional district, as the results by congressional district are estimates from The Green Papers while the statewide results are official results from the Alabama Secretary of State.)	696,832	96.22%	29	10,978	1.52%	0	16,412	2.27%	0	724,222
Total Delegates			50	0			0			50

== See also ==
- 2020 Alabama Democratic presidential primary
