= 2020 Oklahoma Democratic presidential primary =

- March 3, 2020

43 delegates (37 pledged, 6 unpledged) to the Democratic National Convention The number of pledged delegates won is determined by the popular vote

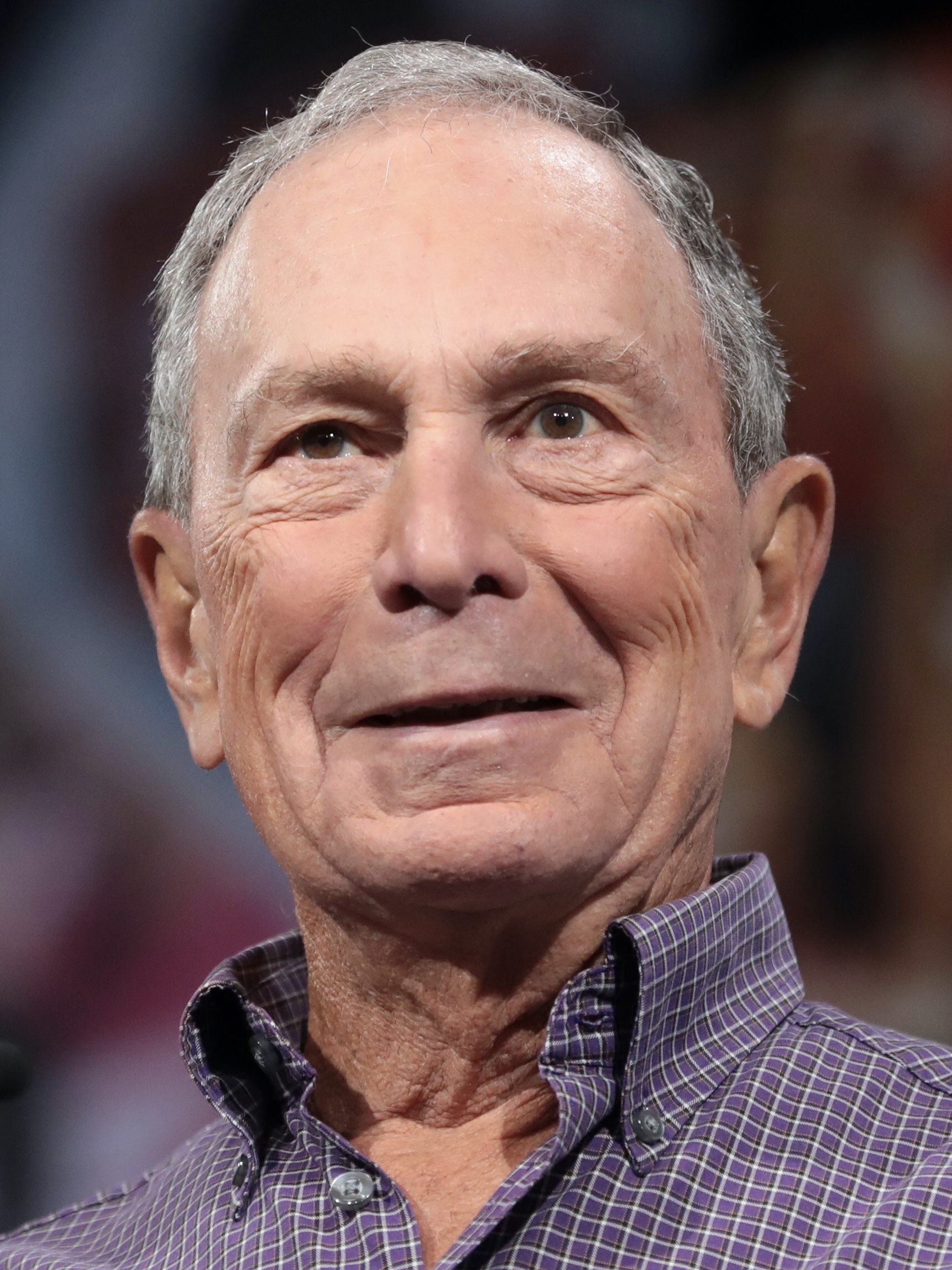

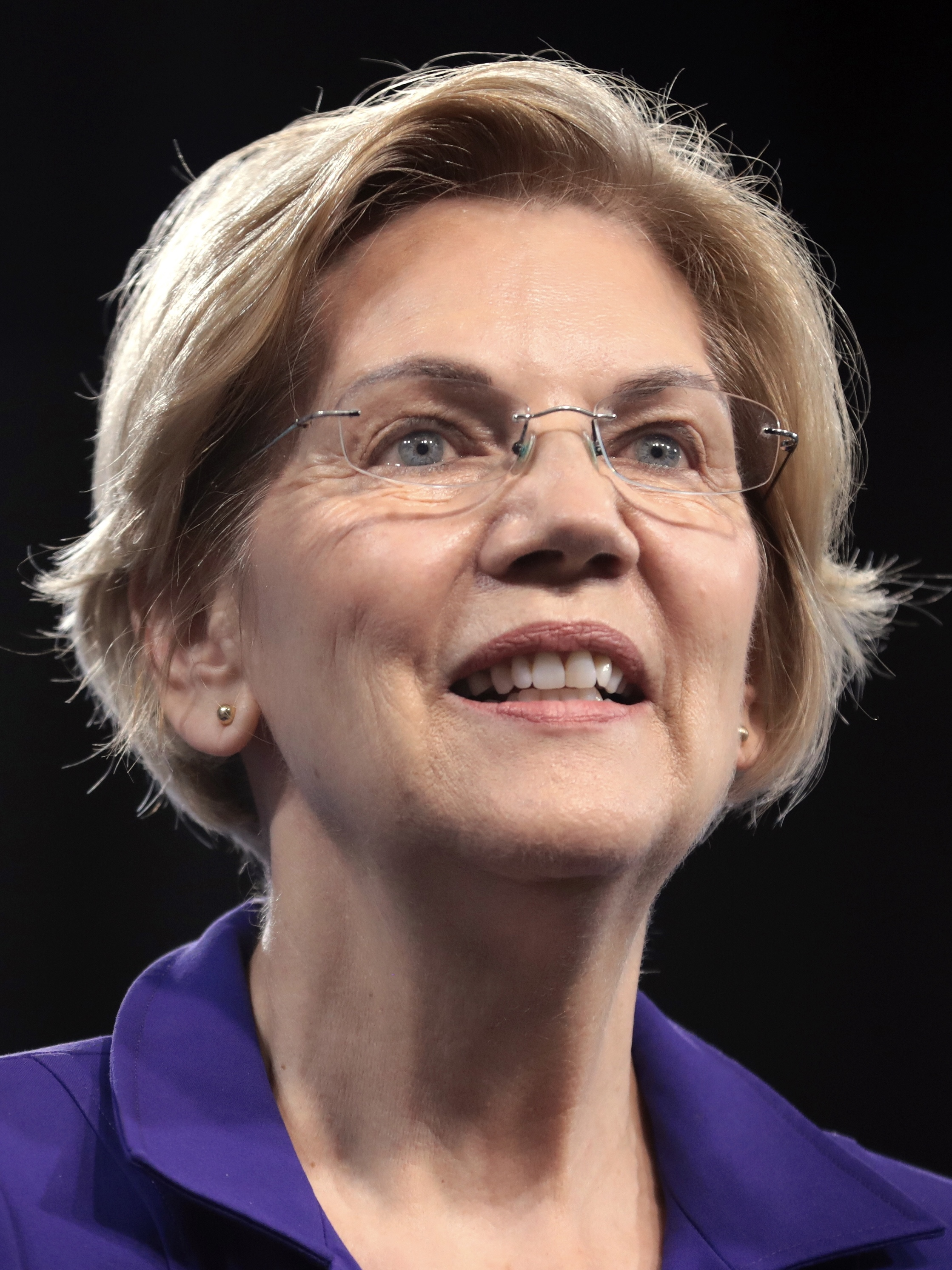
Candidate	Joe Biden	Bernie Sanders
Home state	Delaware	Vermont
Delegate count	21	13
Popular vote	117,633	77,425
Percentage	38.66%	25.45%
Candidate	Michael Bloomberg	Elizabeth Warren
Home state	New York	Massachusetts
Delegate count	2	1
Popular vote	42,270	40,732
Percentage	13.89%	13.39%
County results
Biden
<30%
30–40%
40–50%

The 2020 Oklahoma Democratic presidential primary took place on March 3, 2020, as one of 15 contests scheduled on Super Tuesday in the Democratic Party primaries for the 2020 presidential election, following the South Carolina primary the weekend before. The Oklahoma primary was a semi-closed primary, with the state awarding 43 delegates towards the 2020 Democratic National Convention, 37 of whom were pledged delegates allocated on the basis of the results of the primary.

Former vice president Joe Biden won another southern primary by a large margin with almost 39% of the vote and 21 delegates, while Senator Bernie Sanders placed second with around 25% and 13 delegates. Former mayor Michael Bloomberg and Senator Elizabeth Warren did not reach the threshold, only getting a few district delegates. The election was a remarkable shift from 2016, when Sanders won nearly every county and easily defeated Hillary Clinton by a double digit margin.

== Procedure ==
Oklahoma was one of 14 states and one territory holding primaries on March 3, 2020, also known as "Super Tuesday". Voting took place throughout the state from 7:00 a.m. until 7:00 p.m. In the semi-closed primary, candidates had to meet a threshold of 15 percent at the congressional district or statewide level in order to be considered viable. The 42 pledged delegates to the 2020 Democratic National Convention were allocated proportionally on the basis of the results of the primary. Of these, between four and six were allocated to each of the state's five congressional districts, and another five were allocated to party leaders and elected officials (PLEO delegates), in addition to eight at-large delegates. The Super Tuesday primary as part of Stage I on the primary timetable received no bonus delegates, in order to disperse the primaries between more different date clusters and keep too many states from hoarding on the first shared date or on a March date in general.

The state convention was subsequently held on April 4, 2020, in Tulsa to vote on the national convention delegates. The state delegation also included six unpledged PLEO delegates: five members of the Democratic National Committee and a single representative from Congress, Kendra Horn.

Pledged national convention delegates
Type	Del.
CD1	5
CD2	4
CD3	4
CD4	5
CD5	6
PLEO	5
At-large	8
Total pledged delegates	37

== Candidates ==
The following 14 candidates filed and were on the ballot in Oklahoma:

Running

- Joe Biden
- Michael Bloomberg
- Tulsi Gabbard
- Bernie Sanders
- Elizabeth Warren

Withdrawn

- Michael Bennet
- Pete Buttigieg (Note: Candidate withdrew during absentee voting, shortly before the election.)
- Cory Booker
- Julián Castro
- Amy Klobuchar
- Deval Patrick
- Tom Steyer
- Marianne Williamson
- Andrew Yang

== Polling ==
Polling aggregation
Source of poll aggregation	Date updated	Dates polled	Joe Biden	Bernie Sanders	Michael Bloomberg	Elizabeth Warren	Tulsi Gabbard	Other/ Undecided (Note: Calculated by taking the difference of 100% and all other candidates combined)
270 to Win	March 3, 2020	February 17–March 2, 2020	28.0%	23.7%	16.0%	12.3%	1.5%	18.5%
RealClear Politics	March 3, 2020	Insufficient recent polling to supply an average.						
FiveThirtyEight	March 3, 2020	until March 2, 2020 (Note: FiveThirtyEight aggregates polls with a trendline regression of polls rather than a strict average of recent polls.)	30.6%	22.1%	13.7%	13.6%	1.1%	18.9%
Average			29.3%	22.9%	14.85%	12.95%	1.3%	18.7%
Oklahoma primary results (March 3, 2020)			38.7%	25.4%	13.9%	13.4%	1.7%	6.9%

Tabulation of individual polls of the 2020 Oklahoma Democratic primary
Poll source	Date(s) administered	Sample size	Margin of error	Joe Biden	Michael Bloomberg	Pete Buttigieg	Kamala Harris	Amy Klobuchar	Bernie Sanders	Elizabeth Warren	Other	Undecided
	Mar 1–2, 2020	Buttigieg and Klobuchar withdraw from the race										
Swayable	Mar 1–2, 2020	472 (LV)	± 6.0%	38%	11%	1%	–	1%	26%	13%	9% (Note: Steyer and Gabbard with 1%; "Other" with 7%)	–
Data for Progress	Feb 28–Mar 2, 2020	300 (LV)	± 5.5%	35%	19%	–	–	–	28%	16%	2% (Note: Gabbard with 2%)	–
SoonerPoll	Feb 17–21, 2020	409	4.84%	21%	20%	10%	–	7%	13%	9%	2% (Note: Gabbard with <1%, Patrick with <1% and Steyer with 1%)	19%
Cole Hargrave Snodgrass & Associated	Feb 10–13, 2020	172 (LV)	–	12%	20%	1%	–	6%	14%	8%	21% (Note: "Likely not voting" with 14%; "other candidates" with 7%)	9%
	Dec 3, 2019	Harris withdraws from the race										
SoonerPoll	Jul 17–27, 2019	152	–	26%	–	6%	8%	1%	5%	12%	11% (Note: Booker and Bennet with 2%; Inslee, O'Rourke, Gillibrand, Bullock, Delaney, Hickenlooper, and Williamson with 1%)	34%

== Results ==
Popular vote share by county Biden—<30% Biden—30–40% Biden—40–50%

2020 Oklahoma Democratic presidential primary
Candidate	Votes	%	Delegates
Joe Biden	117,633	38.66	21
Bernie Sanders	77,425	25.45	13
Michael Bloomberg	42,270	13.89	2
Elizabeth Warren	40,732	13.39	1
Amy Klobuchar (withdrawn)	6,733	2.21	
Pete Buttigieg (withdrawn)	5,115	1.68	
Tulsi Gabbard	5,109	1.68	
Tom Steyer (withdrawn)	2,006	0.66	
Andrew Yang (withdrawn)	1,997	0.66	
Cory Booker (withdrawn)	1,530	0.50	
Michael Bennet (withdrawn)	1,273	0.42	
Marianne Williamson (withdrawn)	1,158	0.38	
Deval Patrick (withdrawn)	680	0.22	
Julian Castro (withdrawn)	620	0.20	
Total	304,281	100%	37

=== Results by county ===
2020 Oklahoma Democratic primary (results per county)
County	Joe Biden		Bernie Sanders		Michael Bloomberg		Elizabeth Warren		Amy Klobuchar		Pete Buttigieg		Tulsi Gabbard		Tom Steyer		Andrew Yang		Cory Booker		Michael Bennet		Marianne Williamson		Deval Patrick		Julian Castro		Total votes cast
County	Votes	%	Votes	%	Votes	%	Votes	%	Votes	%	Votes	%	Votes	%	Votes	%	Votes	%	Votes	%	Votes	%	Votes	%	Votes	%	Votes	%	Total votes cast
Adair	423	37.33	235	20.74	181	15.98	100	8.83	50	4.41	20	1.77	36	3.18	23	2.03	9	0.79	12	1.06	17	1.50	16	1.41	7	0.62	4	0.35	1,133
Alfalfa	73	36.14	31	15.35	46	22.77	24	11.88	7	3.47	6	2.97	4	1.98	1	0.50	2	0.99	5	2.48	0	0	2	0.99	1	0.50	0	0	202
Atoka	272	33.58	119	14.69	149	18.40	71	8.77	33	4.07	23	2.84	46	5.68	30	3.70	13	1.60	18	2.22	16	1.98	7	0.86	5	0.62	8	0.99	810
Beaver	42	35.59	13	11.02	25	21.19	12	10.17	4	3.39	6	5.08	5	4.24	2	1.69	0	0	3	2.54	1	0.85	2	1.69	2	1.69	1	0.85	118
Beckham	315	33.87	165	17.74	144	15.48	115	12.37	47	5.05	17	1.83	38	4.09	19	2.04	20	2.15	16	1.72	8	0.86	12	1.29	5	0.54	9	0.97	930
Blaine	222	37.69	98	16.64	116	19.69	63	10.70	24	4.07	16	2.72	22	3.74	7	1.19	5	0.85	3	0.51	3	0.51	6	1.02	1	0.17	3	0.51	589
Bryan	901	37.34	556	23.04	390	16.16	233	9.66	71	2.94	41	1.70	63	2.61	48	1.99	31	1.28	10	0.41	31	1.28	23	0.95	5	0.21	10	0.41	2,413
Caddo	777	36.67	434	20.48	367	17.32	202	9.53	101	4.77	43	2.03	57	2.69	34	1.60	29	1.37	14	0.66	16	0.76	19	0.90	17	0.80	9	0.42	2,119
Canadian	3,460	38.18	2,489	27.47	1,120	12.36	1,321	14.58	169	1.86	141	1.56	151	1.67	39	0.43	46	0.51	21	0.23	42	0.46	20	0.22	21	0.23	22	0.24	9,062
Carter	1,161	41.18	506	17.95	499	17.70	241	8.55	99	3.51	65	2.31	63	2.23	41	1.45	26	0.92	35	1.24	29	1.03	32	1.14	11	0.39	11	0.39	2,819
Cherokee	1,470	34.02	1,188	27.49	658	15.23	448	10.37	177	4.10	104	2.41	101	2.34	52	1.20	28	0.65	26	0.60	24	0.56	23	0.53	15	0.35	7	0.16	4,321
Choctaw	323	37.04	148	16.97	129	14.79	82	9.40	37	4.24	29	3.33	43	4.93	18	2.06	12	1.38	14	1.61	14	1.61	8	0.92	6	0.69	9	1.03	872
Cimarron	20	22.99	8	9.20	16	18.39	5	5.75	9	10.34	3	3.45	6	6.90	3	3.45	2	2.30	9	10.34	2	2.30	1	1.15	0	0	3	3.45	87
Cleveland	10,009	34.12	9,632	32.84	2,869	9.78	5,220	17.80	421	1.44	470	1.60	309	1.05	93	0.32	127	0.43	55	0.19	44	0.15	49	0.17	16	0.05	20	0.07	29,334
Coal	137	34.25	72	18.00	67	16.75	37	9.25	10	2.50	6	1.50	32	8.00	10	2.50	10	2.50	5	1.25	9	2.25	3	0.75	2	0.50	0	0	400
Comanche	2,999	46.07	1,602	24.61	844	12.97	551	8.47	101	1.55	104	1.60	81	1.24	48	0.74	47	0.72	30	0.46	21	0.32	39	0.60	27	0.41	15	0.23	6,509
Cotton	128	35.36	49	13.54	75	20.72	38	10.50	15	4.14	11	3.04	9	2.49	12	3.31	6	1.66	4	1.10	2	0.55	4	1.10	6	1.66	3	0.83	362
Craig	458	36.61	208	16.63	202	16.15	131	10.47	65	5.20	36	2.88	52	4.16	27	2.16	27	2.16	12	0.96	12	0.96	7	0.56	10	0.80	4	0.32	1,251
Creek	1,737	38.04	982	21.51	891	19.51	499	10.93	137	3.00	82	1.80	96	2.10	25	0.55	29	0.64	22	0.48	18	0.39	27	0.59	11	0.24	10	0.22	4,566
Custer	571	36.00	394	24.84	236	14.88	207	13.05	45	2.84	29	1.83	43	2.71	8	0.50	12	0.76	7	0.44	15	0.95	9	0.57	3	0.19	7	0.44	1,586
Delaware	1,110	44.10	378	15.02	492	19.55	209	8.30	96	3.81	51	2.03	60	2.38	28	1.11	26	1.03	13	0.52	20	0.79	12	0.48	13	0.52	9	0.36	2,517
Dewey	89	33.58	32	12.08	50	18.87	41	15.47	15	5.66	7	2.64	10	3.77	3	1.13	3	1.13	6	2.26	3	1.13	1	0.38	3	1.13	2	0.75	265
Ellis	55	30.22	23	12.64	31	17.03	34	18.68	7	3.85	6	3.30	11	6.04	6	3.30	0	0	1	0.55	1	0.55	4	2.20	2	1.10	1	0.55	182
Garfield	1,215	40.27	639	21.18	505	16.74	385	12.76	66	2.19	70	2.32	47	1.56	18	0.60	16	0.53	12	0.40	15	0.50	12	0.40	4	0.13	13	0.43	3,017
Garvin	635	37.27	290	17.02	292	17.14	198	11.62	89	5.22	39	2.29	49	2.88	23	1.35	22	1.29	15	0.88	19	1.12	12	0.70	9	0.53	12	0.70	1,704
Grady	1,229	38.38	625	19.52	475	14.83	423	13.21	121	3.78	71	2.22	81	2.53	37	1.16	33	1.03	26	0.81	22	0.69	31	0.97	13	0.41	15	0.47	3,202
Grant	98	42.61	37	16.09	34	14.78	28	12.17	12	5.22	5	2.17	4	1.74	5	2.17	0	0	2	0.87	0	0	3	1.30	2	0.87	0	0	230
Greer	129	33.77	72	18.85	52	13.61	47	12.30	18	4.71	14	3.66	18	4.71	10	2.62	6	1.57	4	1.05	4	1.05	3	0.79	1	0.26	4	1.05	382
Harmon	60	36.59	25	15.24	29	17.68	12	7.32	18	10.98	6	3.66	2	1.22	2	1.22	4	2.44	2	1.22	1	0.61	2	1.22	0	0	1	0.61	164
Harper	57	36.54	20	12.82	25	16.03	21	13.46	7	4.49	6	3.85	8	5.13	5	3.21	2	1.28	0	0	1	0.64	3	1.92	0	0	1	0.64	156
Haskell	355	38.84	133	14.55	157	17.18	66	7.22	48	5.25	24	2.63	34	3.72	20	2.19	29	3.17	11	1.20	10	1.09	8	0.88	13	1.42	6	0.66	914
Hughes	361	32.23	159	14.20	200	17.86	122	10.89	75	6.70	37	3.30	53	4.73	24	2.14	22	1.96	19	1.70	18	1.61	14	1.25	10	0.89	6	0.54	1,120
Jackson	395	45.30	176	20.18	106	12.16	71	8.14	20	2.29	25	2.87	22	2.52	11	1.26	9	1.03	12	1.38	6	0.69	7	0.80	4	0.46	8	0.92	872
Jefferson	148	37.95	45	11.54	64	16.41	44	11.28	26	6.67	8	2.05	13	3.33	10	2.56	3	0.77	5	1.28	8	2.05	7	1.79	3	0.77	6	1.54	390
Johnston	265	38.18	113	16.28	124	17.87	71	10.23	36	5.19	13	1.87	13	1.87	13	1.87	17	2.45	9	1.30	6	0.86	4	0.58	8	1.15	2	0.29	694
Kay	1,071	41.92	504	19.73	392	15.34	321	12.56	66	2.58	54	2.11	44	1.72	16	0.63	20	0.78	18	0.70	17	0.67	15	0.59	7	0.27	10	0.39	2,555
Kingfisher	206	32.19	129	20.16	121	18.91	86	13.44	32	5.00	16	2.50	18	2.81	7	1.09	8	1.25	6	0.94	3	0.47	4	0.63	3	0.47	1	0.16	640
Kiowa	248	42.25	73	12.44	118	20.10	64	10.90	21	3.58	16	2.73	18	3.07	5	0.85	3	0.51	6	1.02	8	1.36	2	0.34	2	0.34	3	0.51	587
Latimer	305	34.35	133	14.98	142	15.99	84	9.46	61	6.87	21	2.36	48	5.41	17	1.91	23	2.59	19	2.14	12	1.35	11	1.24	9	1.01	3	0.34	888
Le Flore	1,168	38.48	560	18.45	435	14.33	260	8.57	108	3.56	93	3.06	129	4.25	67	2.21	60	1.98	42	1.38	33	1.09	32	1.05	32	1.05	16	0.53	3,035
Lincoln	842	38.80	401	18.48	378	17.42	263	12.12	86	3.96	35	1.61	63	2.90	22	1.01	19	0.88	15	0.69	19	0.88	12	0.55	7	0.32	8	0.37	2,170
Logan	1,230	42.36	646	22.25	389	13.40	406	13.98	70	2.41	58	2.00	36	1.24	14	0.48	12	0.41	15	0.52	10	0.34	9	0.31	6	0.21	3	0.10	2,904
Love	209	35.19	112	18.86	103	17.34	58	9.76	23	3.87	13	2.19	28	4.71	16	2.69	17	2.86	2	0.34	4	0.67	5	0.84	4	0.67	0	0	594
Major	94	37.60	35	14.00	45	18.00	28	11.20	8	3.20	11	4.40	11	4.40	4	1.60	2	0.80	6	2.40	2	0.80	2	0.80	0	0	2	0.80	250
Marshall	332	37.09	141	15.75	184	20.56	85	9.50	28	3.13	32	3.58	25	2.79	12	1.34	7	0.78	17	1.90	12	1.34	11	1.23	3	0.34	6	0.67	895
Mayes	1,155	37.46	576	18.68	592	19.20	338	10.96	103	3.34	48	1.56	90	2.92	46	1.49	42	1.36	30	0.97	21	0.68	16	0.52	16	0.52	10	0.32	3,083
McClain	1,048	39.47	534	20.11	404	15.22	366	13.79	80	3.01	57	2.15	59	2.22	21	0.79	17	0.64	37	1.39	11	0.41	7	0.26	9	0.34	5	0.19	2,655
McCurtain	657	39.15	281	16.75	192	11.44	141	8.40	71	4.23	52	3.10	85	5.07	42	2.50	35	2.09	29	1.73	33	1.97	33	1.97	13	0.77	14	0.83	1,678
McIntosh	696	38.03	308	16.83	357	19.51	176	9.62	88	4.81	30	1.64	51	2.79	23	1.26	17	0.93	19	1.04	23	1.26	18	0.98	13	0.71	11	0.60	1,830
Murray	439	38.64	181	15.93	173	15.23	102	8.98	59	5.19	23	2.02	41	3.61	29	2.55	17	1.50	29	2.55	9	0.79	19	1.67	7	0.62	8	0.70	1,136
Muskogee	2,461	41.45	1,108	18.66	1,129	19.02	540	9.10	212	3.57	78	1.31	129	2.17	58	0.98	59	0.99	50	0.84	34	0.57	39	0.66	28	0.47	12	0.20	5,937
Noble	246	33.24	131	17.70	136	18.38	105	14.19	41	5.54	23	3.11	20	2.70	4	0.54	4	0.54	14	1.89	7	0.95	3	0.41	3	0.41	3	0.41	740
Nowata	218	33.23	104	15.85	137	20.88	93	14.18	39	5.95	13	1.98	19	2.90	9	1.37	7	1.07	5	0.76	7	1.07	2	0.30	2	0.30	1	0.15	656
Okfuskee	277	36.21	120	15.69	141	18.43	93	12.16	39	5.10	15	1.96	19	2.48	11	1.44	8	1.05	16	2.09	5	0.65	9	1.18	6	0.78	6	0.78	765
Oklahoma	31,394	41.34	21,130	27.82	8,443	11.12	11,432	15.05	832	1.10	1,026	1.35	675	0.89	167	0.22	298	0.39	166	0.22	145	0.19	117	0.15	53	0.07	69	0.09	75,947
Okmulgee	1,257	41.42	507	16.71	649	21.38	235	7.74	103	3.39	63	2.08	71	2.34	30	0.99	34	1.12	25	0.82	26	0.86	14	0.46	12	0.40	9	0.30	3,035
Osage	1,817	44.28	821	20.01	704	17.16	409	9.97	83	2.02	38	0.93	76	1.85	39	0.95	27	0.66	32	0.78	16	0.39	20	0.49	11	0.27	10	0.24	4,103
Ottawa	944	44.74	411	19.48	276	13.08	180	8.53	65	3.08	59	2.80	71	3.36	35	1.66	14	0.66	18	0.85	8	0.38	14	0.66	10	0.47	5	0.24	2,110
Pawnee	419	35.39	240	20.27	222	18.75	130	10.98	46	3.89	18	1.52	34	2.87	14	1.18	15	1.27	11	0.93	12	1.01	12	1.01	10	0.84	1	0.08	1,184
Payne	2,240	34.92	1,786	27.84	743	11.58	1,216	18.96	124	1.93	114	1.78	86	1.34	18	0.28	31	0.48	21	0.33	7	0.11	12	0.19	12	0.19	5	0.08	6,415
Pittsburg	1,344	36.45	703	19.07	597	16.19	355	9.63	219	5.94	75	2.03	145	3.93	39	1.06	51	1.38	50	1.36	33	0.90	39	1.06	16	0.43	21	0.57	3,687
Pontotoc	1,113	39.23	735	25.91	381	13.43	301	10.61	72	2.54	54	1.90	48	1.69	34	1.20	27	0.95	27	0.95	23	0.81	12	0.42	7	0.25	3	0.11	2,837
Pottawatomie	1,887	39.17	1,022	21.22	786	16.32	607	12.60	152	3.16	107	2.22	83	1.72	37	0.77	27	0.56	23	0.48	31	0.64	24	0.50	15	0.31	16	0.33	4,817
Pushmataha	253	31.98	119	15.04	145	18.33	87	11.00	57	7.21	20	2.53	37	4.68	22	2.78	8	1.01	10	1.26	10	1.26	11	1.39	5	0.63	7	0.88	791
Roger Mills	77	31.56	36	14.75	31	12.70	36	14.75	18	7.38	14	5.74	11	4.51	6	2.46	0	0	7	2.87	3	1.23	1	0.41	2	0.82	2	0.82	244
Rogers	2,168	36.13	1,362	22.70	1,070	17.83	740	12.33	193	3.22	125	2.08	120	2.00	52	0.87	62	1.03	34	0.57	20	0.33	31	0.52	10	0.17	13	0.22	6,000
Seminole	685	40.60	310	18.38	275	16.30	183	10.85	61	3.62	39	2.31	44	2.61	22	1.30	14	0.83	14	0.83	19	1.13	9	0.53	5	0.30	7	0.41	1,687
Sequoyah	1,023	39.90	431	16.81	455	17.75	211	8.23	106	4.13	49	1.91	93	3.63	60	2.34	31	1.21	19	0.74	39	1.52	23	0.90	10	0.39	14	0.55	2,564
Stephens	977	42.24	430	18.59	353	15.26	256	11.07	68	2.94	49	2.12	40	1.73	25	1.08	24	1.04	40	1.73	26	1.12	9	0.39	8	0.35	8	0.35	2,313
Texas	146	34.76	89	21.19	53	12.62	55	13.10	13	3.10	12	2.86	14	3.33	6	1.43	7	1.67	9	2.14	4	0.95	7	1.67	3	0.71	2	0.48	420
Tillman	179	44.20	56	13.83	71	17.53	30	7.41	17	4.20	15	3.70	13	3.21	5	1.23	5	1.23	5	1.23	3	0.74	2	0.49	3	0.74	1	0.25	405
Tulsa	21,099	36.89	17,233	30.13	8,070	14.11	8,086	14.14	673	1.18	710	1.24	627	1.10	128	0.22	216	0.38	115	0.20	83	0.15	80	0.14	35	0.06	34	0.06	57,189
Wagoner	1,998	39.38	1,164	22.95	896	17.66	526	10.37	136	2.68	91	1.79	114	2.25	38	0.75	32	0.63	31	0.61	14	0.28	9	0.18	12	0.24	12	0.24	5,073
Washington	1,385	41.79	711	21.45	520	15.69	415	12.52	78	2.35	65	1.96	52	1.57	21	0.63	18	0.54	12	0.36	10	0.30	15	0.45	3	0.09	9	0.27	3,314
Washita	216	31.91	120	17.73	110	16.25	85	12.56	54	7.98	21	3.10	18	2.66	14	2.07	3	0.44	14	2.07	5	0.74	6	0.89	5	0.74	6	0.89	677
Woods	142	33.97	72	17.22	77	18.42	66	15.79	24	5.74	13	3.11	7	1.67	4	0.96	0	0	6	1.44	2	0.48	4	0.96	0	0	1	0.24	418
Woodward	269	35.35	164	21.55	115	15.11	110	14.45	28	3.68	16	2.10	15	1.97	12	1.58	3	0.39	8	1.05	6	0.79	6	0.79	7	0.92	2	0.26	761
Total	117,633	38.66	77,425	25.45	42,270	13.89	40,732	13.39	6,733	2.21	5,115	1.68	5,109	1.68	2,006	0.66	1,997	0.66	1,530	0.50	1,273	0.42	1,158	0.38	680	0.22	620	0.20	304,281

== See also ==
- 2020 Oklahoma Republican presidential primary
