= 2020 Virginia Democratic presidential primary =

- March 3, 2020

124 delegates (99 pledged, 25 unpledged) to the Democratic National Convention The number of pledged delegates won is determined by the popular vote

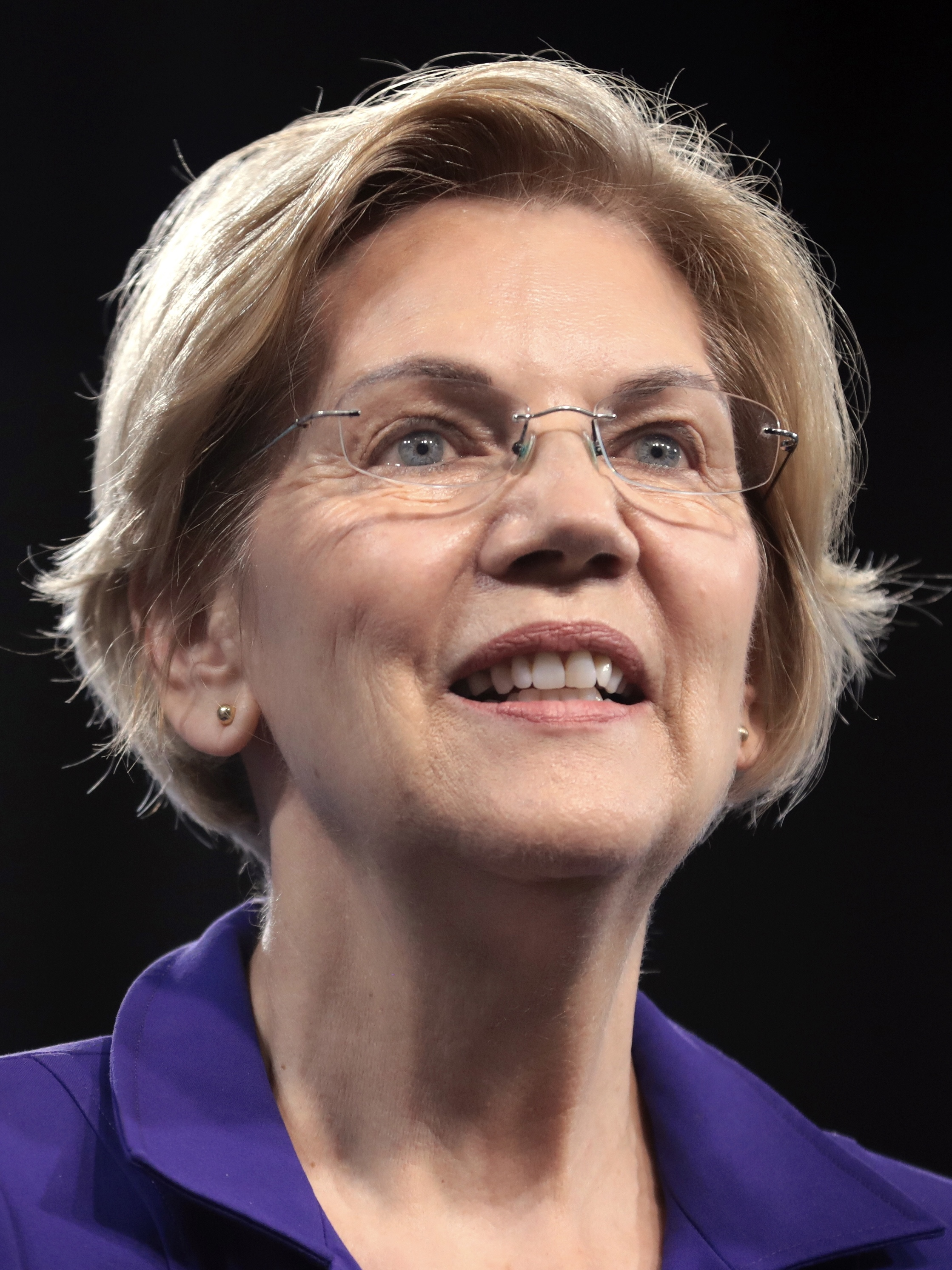

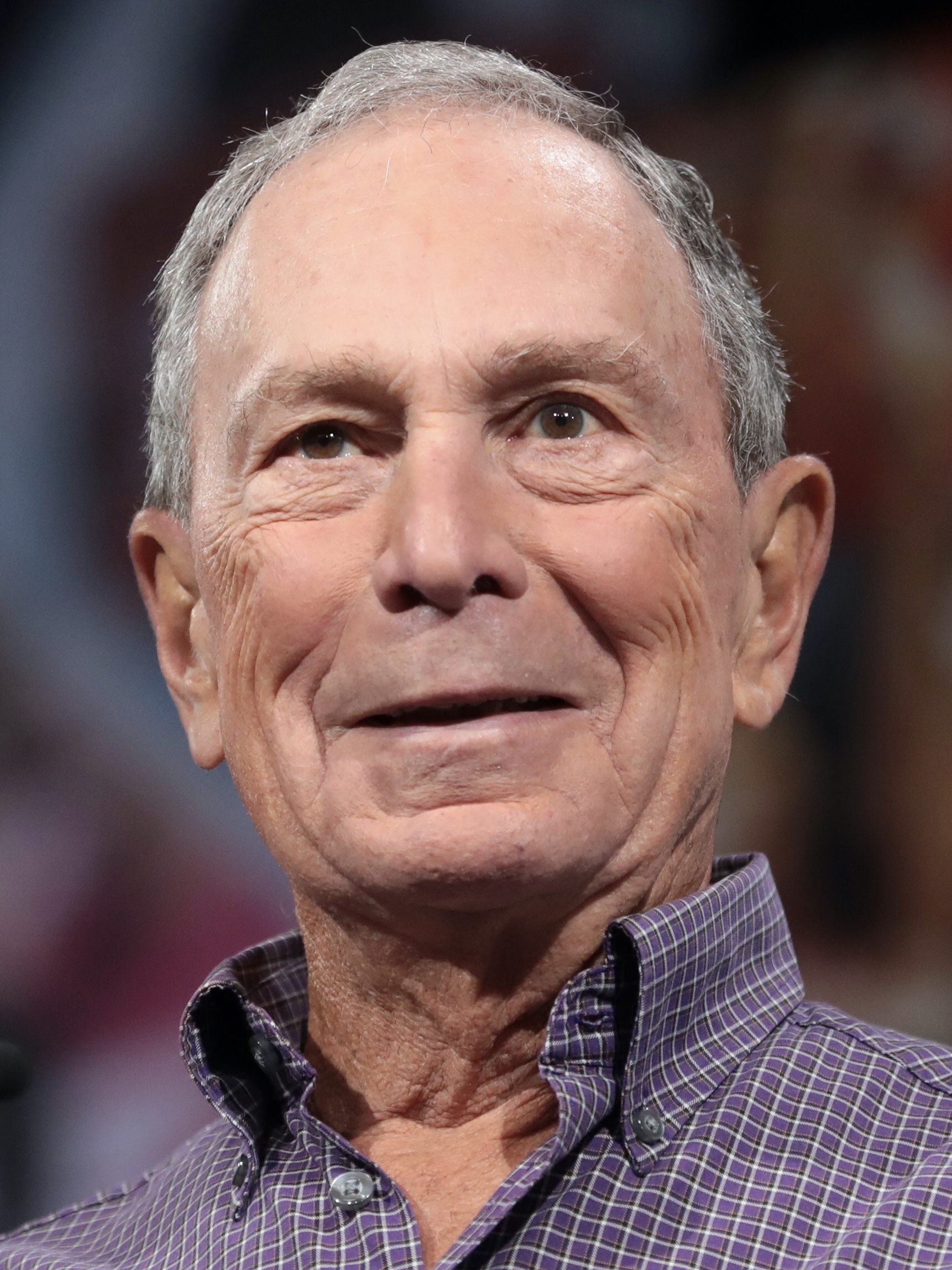
Candidate	Joe Biden	Bernie Sanders
Home state	Delaware	Vermont
Delegate count	67	31
Popular vote	705,501	306,388
Percentage	53.30%	23.15%
Candidate	Elizabeth Warren	Michael Bloomberg
Home state	Massachusetts	New York
Delegate count	1	0
Popular vote	142,546	128,030
Percentage	10.77%	9.67%

Joe Biden	Bernie Sanders

Pledged national convention delegates
Type	Del.	Type	Del.
CD1	6	CD7	6
CD2	5	CD8	7
CD3	7	CD9	4
CD4	6	CD10	6
CD5	6	CD11	7
CD6	5	CD11	7
PLEO	13	At-large	21
Total pledged delegates			99

The 2020 Virginia Democratic presidential primary took place on March 3, 2020, as one of 15 contests scheduled on Super Tuesday in the Democratic Party primaries for the 2020 presidential election, following the South Carolina primary the weekend before. The Virginia primary was an open primary, wherein any registered voter can vote, regardless of party registration. The state awarded 124 delegates towards the 2020 Democratic National Convention, of which 99 were pledged delegates allocated at the local level.

Former vice president Joe Biden won the state by a landslide, receiving more than 53% of the vote and 67 delegates, far ahead of senator Bernie Sanders, who reached around 23% and 31 delegates, and senator Elizabeth Warren, who failed to poll over 15% and got a single district delegate. Biden's win by over 30 points was much stronger than expected in pre-election polls, and he also won nearly every county across nearly all demographics. His strongest performances were among African-American voters, suburban voters and he also handily won nearly all rural counties dominated by white, working-class voters.

== Procedure ==
Virginia was one of 14 states and one territory holding primaries on March 3, 2020, also known as "Super Tuesday". Absentee voting began 45 days earlier, on January 18, 2020, for voters able to give an acceptable reason for being unable to vote on March 3. Voting took place throughout the state from 6:00 a.m. until 7:00 p.m. In the open primary, candidates had to meet a threshold of 15 percent at the congressional district or statewide level in order to be considered viable. The 99 pledged delegates to the 2020 Democratic National Convention were allocated proportionally on the basis of the results of the primary. Of these, between 4 and 7 were allocated to each of the state's 11 congressional districts and another 13 were allocated to party leaders and elected officials (PLEO delegates), in addition to 21 at-large delegates. The Super Tuesday primary as part of Stage I on the primary timetable received no bonus delegates, in order to disperse the primaries between more different date clusters and keep too many states from hoarding on the first shared date or on a March date in general.

After county and city caucuses between April 18, and April 20, 2020, during which district delegates were elected for the district conventions and the state convention, the district conventions between May 2, and May 16, 2020, elected national convention district level delegates. The state convention then convened on June 20, 2020, in Richmond to vote on the 21 at-large and 13 pledged PLEO delegates for the Democratic National Convention. The delegation also included 25 unpledged PLEO delegates: 14 members of the Democratic National Committee, 9 members of Congress (both senators, one of them was former DNC chair Tim Kaine, and 7 representatives), the governor Ralph Northam, and former DNC chair Terry McAuliffe.

== Candidates ==
Ballot access to the primary was not automatic, and potential candidates had to file a 5,000-signature petition from qualified voters, with at least 200 signatures from each of the state's 11 congressional districts by December 12, 2019, to appear on the primary ballot.

The following candidates were on the ballot:

Running

- Joe Biden
- Michael Bloomberg
- Tulsi Gabbard
- Bernie Sanders
- Elizabeth Warren

Withdrawn

- Michael Bennet (Note: Candidate withdrew following the New Hampshire primary, when absentee voting had already begun.)
- Cory Booker
- Pete Buttigieg (Note: Candidate withdrew during absentee voting, shortly before the primary.)
- Julian Castro
- Amy Klobuchar
- Deval Patrick
- Tom Steyer
- Marianne Williamson
- Andrew Yang

== Polling ==
Polling Aggregation
Source of poll aggregation	Date updated	Dates Polled	Joe Biden	Bernie Sanders	Michael Bloomberg	Elizabeth Warren	Tulsi Gabbard	Un- decided (Note: Calculated by taking the difference of 100% and all other candidates combined)
270 to Win	March 3, 2020	Until March 3, 2020	28.8%	20.0%	17.3%	10.3%	0.7%	23.9% (Note: Compared to the other figures, this might be unusually high)
RealClear Politics	March 3, 2020	Until March 3, 2020	44.0%	24.5%	14.0%	15.0%	0.0%	2.5%
FiveThirtyEight	Mar 3, 2020	until Mar 3, 2020 (Note: FiveThirtyEight aggregates polls with a trendline regression of polls rather than a strict average of recent polls.)	39.9%	21.0%	13.2%	12.3%	0.5%	13.1%
Average			37.6%	21.8%	14.1%	12.5%	0.4%	13.2%
Virginia primary results (March 3, 2020)			53.3%	23.1%	9.7%	10.8%	0.9%	2.2%

Tabulation of individual polls of the 2020 Virginia Democratic Primary
Poll source	Date(s) administered	Sample size (Note: Key: A – all adults RV – registered voters LV – likely voters V – unclear)	Margin of error	Joe Biden	Michael Bloomberg	Cory Booker	Pete Buttigieg	Kamala Harris	Amy Klobuchar	Beto O'Rourke	Bernie Sanders	Elizabeth Warren	Other	Un- decided
	Mar 2, 2020	Klobuchar withdraws from the race												
Swayable	Mar 1–2, 2020	1,435 (LV)	± 4.0%	36%	20%	–	4%	–	3%	–	20%	11%	6% (Note: Steyer with 3%; Gabbard with 0%; "Other" with 3%)	–
AtlasIntel	Mar 1–2, 2020	545 (LV)	± 4.0%	42%	11%	–	1%	–	1%	–	28%	10%	3% (Note: Gabbard with 1%; "Other" with 2%)	4%
Change Research	Mar 1–2, 2020	510 (LV)	–	45%	10%	–	–	–	4%	–	25%	13%	3% (Note: Not yet released)	–
Data for Progress	Feb 28–Mar 2, 2020	327 (LV)	± 5.4%	39%	18%	–	–	–	–	–	24%	17%	1% (Note: Gabbard with 1%)	–
	Mar 1, 2020	Buttigieg withdraws from the race												
Data for Progress	Feb 23 – 25, 2020	499 (LV)	± 4.5%	19%	17%	–	12%	–	5%	–	28%	17%	2% (Note: Gabbard and Steyer with 1%)	–
Monmouth University	Feb 13 – 16, 2020	400 (LV)	± 4.9%	18%	22%	–	11%	–	9%	–	22%	5%	1% (Note: Gabbard with 1%; Steyer with 0%)	11%
Monmouth University	Feb 13 – 16, 2020	400 (LV)	± 4.9%	51% (Note: If only the two candidates for which percentages are listed could be voted for)	–	–	–	–	–	–	38%	–	4% (Note: "Already voted" with 1%; "neither" with 3%)	7%
Monmouth University	Feb 13 – 16, 2020	400 (LV)	± 4.9%	–	47% (Note: If only the two candidates for which percentages are listed could be voted for)	–	–	–	–	–	41%	–	5% (Note: "Already voted" with 1%; "neither" with 4%)	7%
Monmouth University	Feb 13 – 16, 2020	400 (LV)	± 4.9%	–	–	–	42% (Note: If only the two candidates for which percentages are listed could be voted for)	–	–	–	44%	–	7% (Note: "Already voted" with 1%; "neither" with 6%)	7%
Monmouth University	Feb 13 – 16, 2020	400 (LV)	± 4.9%	–	–	–	–	–	42% (Note: If only the two candidates for which percentages are listed could be voted for)	–	45%	–	6% (Note: "Already voted" with 1%; "neither" with 5%)	7%
Christopher Newport University	Feb 3 – 23, 2020	561 (LV)	± 4.3%	22%	13%	–	8%	–	5%	–	17%	8%	6% (Note: Andrew Yang with 5%; Steyer with 1%; Michael Bennet with 0%)	16% (Note: Undecided with 13%; Don't know/Refused with 3%)
	Jan 13, 2020	Booker withdraws from the race												
	Dec 3, 2019	Harris withdraws from the race												
	Nov 24, 2019	Bloomberg announces his candidacy												
	Nov 1, 2019	O'Rourke withdraws from the race												
University of Mary Washington	Sep 3 – 15, 2019	882 (RV)	± 3.3%	23%	–	1%	4%	5%	2%	1%	9%	9%	46% (Note: Yang with 2%; Castro with 1%; Non-voter/no answer with 43%)	–
Hampton University	May 29 – Jun 6, 2019	1,126 (RV)	± 4.3%	36%	–	2%	11%	7%	<1%	3%	17%	13%	10% (Note: Castro with 2%; Bullock, Gillibrand, and Yang with 1%; Bennet, de Blasio, Delaney, Gabbard, Hickenlooper, Inslee, Moulton, Ryan, Swalwell, and Williamson with <1%; Messam with 0%; others with 5%)	–
Change Research	Apr 26–30, 2019	551 (LV)	± 4.2%	41%	–	3%	12%	5%	1%	4%	20%	10%	5% (Note: Castro with 2%; Abrams, Swalwell, and Yang with 1%; Delaney, Gabbard, Gillibrand, Inslee, Ryan, and Williamson with 0%)	–

== Results ==
Popular vote share by county
Biden—30–40%
Biden—40–50%
Biden—50–60%
Biden—60–70%
Biden—70–80%
Sanders—30–40%
Sanders—40–50%

Popular vote share by congressional district
Biden—40–50%
Biden—50–60%

2020 Virginia Democratic presidential primary (Note: The "2020 March Democratic Presidential Primary" website published by the Virginia Department of Elections does not include the write-in votes. This article includes them.)
Candidate	Votes	%	Delegates
Joe Biden	705,501	53.30	67
Bernie Sanders	306,388	23.15	31
Elizabeth Warren	142,546	10.77	1
Michael Bloomberg	128,030	9.67	
Tulsi Gabbard	11,288	0.85	
Pete Buttigieg (withdrawn)	11,199	0.85	
Amy Klobuchar (withdrawn)	8,414	0.64	
Andrew Yang (withdrawn)	3,361	0.25	
Cory Booker (withdrawn)	1,910	0.14	
Tom Steyer (withdrawn)	1,472	0.11	
Michael Bennet (withdrawn)	1,437	0.11	
Marianne Williamson (withdrawn)	902	0.07	
Julian Castro (withdrawn)	691	0.05	
Deval Patrick (withdrawn)	370	0.03	
Write-in votes	184	0.01	
Total	1,323,693	100%	99

=== Results by locality ===
2020 Virginia Democratic primary (results per locality)
Locality	Joe Biden		Bernie Sanders		Elizabeth Warren		Michael Bloomberg		Tulsi Gabbard		Pete Buttigieg		Amy Klobuchar		Andrew Yang		Cory Booker		Tom Steyer		Michael Bennet		Marianne Williamson		Julian Castro		Deval Patrick		Write-in votes		Total votes cast
Locality	Votes	%	Votes	%	Votes	%	Votes	%	Votes	%	Votes	%	Votes	%	Votes	%	Votes	%	Votes	%	Votes	%	Votes	%	Votes	%	Votes	%	Votes	%	Total votes cast
Accomack	2,026	61.34	598	18.10	173	5.24	374	11.32	41	1.24	38	1.15	25	0.76	3	0.09	8	0.24	3	0.09	9	0.27	3	0.09	2	0.06	0	0	0	0	3,303
Albemarle	12,343	45.97	6,321	23.54	4,740	17.65	2,752	10.25	156	0.58	233	0.87	214	0.80	38	0.14	8	0.03	19	0.07	10	0.04	5	0.02	6	0.02	3	0.01	0	0	26,848
Alexandria	20,806	49.94	7,603	18.25	7,637	18.33	4,248	10.20	246	0.59	583	1.40	343	0.82	65	0.16	36	0.09	22	0.05	31	0.07	17	0.04	15	0.04	11	0.03	2	0.00	41,665
Alleghany	586	53.76	234	21.47	96	8.81	103	9.45	18	1.65	13	1.19	19	1.74	5	0.46	1	0.09	5	0.46	4	0.37	0	0	2	0.18	4	0.37	0	0	1,090
Amelia	765	67.58	171	15.11	46	4.06	103	9.10	6	0.53	14	1.24	4	0.35	2	0.18	8	0.71	5	0.44	4	0.35	2	0.18	0	0	2	0.18	0	0	1,132
Amherst	1,521	63.61	431	18.03	195	8.16	161	6.73	25	1.05	14	0.59	15	0.63	9	0.38	3	0.13	4	0.17	7	0.29	4	0.17	0	0	2	0.08	0	0	2,391
Appomattox	667	61.99	220	20.45	57	5.30	71	6.60	24	2.23	11	1.02	8	0.74	2	0.19	4	0.37	1	0.09	4	0.37	3	0.28	0	0	3	0.28	1	0.09	1,076
Arlington	34,003	48.24	13,284	18.84	14,076	19.97	6,689	9.49	383	0.54	1,109	1.57	612	0.87	154	0.22	47	0.07	31	0.04	40	0.06	27	0.04	27	0.04	11	0.02	1	0.00	70,494
Augusta	3,072	50.86	1,511	25.02	622	10.30	517	8.56	98	1.62	66	1.09	70	1.16	22	0.36	21	0.35	11	0.18	8	0.13	8	0.13	10	0.17	4	0.07	0	0	6,040
Bath	188	52.22	68	18.89	33	9.17	41	11.39	10	2.78	6	1.67	7	1.94	1	0.28	1	0.28	2	0.56	2	0.56	0	0	0	0	1	0.28	0	0	360
Bedford	3,565	54.73	1,361	20.89	558	8.57	718	11.02	122	1.87	54	0.83	54	0.83	31	0.48	7	0.11	16	0.25	10	0.15	7	0.11	3	0.05	8	0.12	0	0	6,514
Bland	139	45.13	82	26.62	43	13.96	24	7.79	8	2.60	2	0.65	4	1.30	1	0.32	2	0.65	1	0.32	1	0.32	0	0	0	0	1	0.32	0	0	308
Botetourt	1,673	53.85	693	22.30	286	9.21	318	10.23	48	1.54	28	0.90	25	0.80	10	0.32	4	0.13	7	0.23	4	0.13	5	0.16	3	0.10	3	0.10	0	0	3,107
Bristol	512	49.18	325	31.22	94	9.03	74	7.11	7	0.67	8	0.77	7	0.67	3	0.29	1	0.10	2	0.19	2	0.19	3	0.29	1	0.10	2	0.19	0	0	1,041
Brunswick	1,366	73.24	243	13.03	50	2.68	173	9.28	10	0.54	3	0.16	4	0.21	5	0.27	0	0	3	0.16	3	0.16	2	0.11	2	0.11	1	0.05	0	0	1,865
Buchanan	403	59.97	143	21.28	35	5.21	65	9.67	2	0.30	2	0.30	6	0.89	2	0.30	6	0.89	4	0.60	2	0.30	2	0.30	0	0	0	0	0	0	672
Buckingham	945	63.13	284	18.97	78	5.21	130	8.68	15	1.00	8	0.53	10	0.67	5	0.33	8	0.53	4	0.27	5	0.33	2	0.13	1	0.07	2	0.13	0	0	1,497
Buena Vista	190	49.87	87	22.83	51	13.39	36	9.45	7	1.84	3	0.79	3	0.79	1	0.26	3	0.79	0	0	0	0	0	0	0	0	0	0	0	0	381
Campbell	2,165	61.96	646	18.49	228	6.53	319	9.13	54	1.55	26	0.74	20	0.57	10	0.29	9	0.26	10	0.29	4	0.11	2	0.06	1	0.03	0	0	0	0	3,494
Caroline	2,537	64.20	744	18.83	222	5.62	323	8.17	34	0.86	26	0.66	16	0.40	11	0.28	13	0.33	6	0.15	8	0.20	8	0.20	2	0.05	2	0.05	0	0	3,952
Carroll	770	49.20	425	27.16	107	6.84	157	10.03	31	1.98	12	0.77	23	1.47	12	0.77	8	0.51	5	0.32	5	0.32	2	0.13	3	0.19	4	0.26	1	0.06	1,565
Charles City	860	71.19	169	13.99	46	3.81	102	8.44	8	0.66	6	0.50	5	0.41	3	0.25	3	0.25	2	0.17	3	0.25	0	0	1	0.08	0	0	0	0	1,208
Charlotte	702	71.85	127	13.00	43	4.40	86	8.80	6	0.61	2	0.20	3	0.31	0	0	1	0.10	3	0.31	2	0.20	0	0	2	0.20	0	0	0	0	977
Charlottesville	4,418	32.18	4,681	34.09	3,451	25.13	875	6.37	55	0.40	115	0.84	85	0.62	29	0.21	7	0.05	2	0.01	3	0.02	4	0.03	3	0.02	2	0.01	1	0.01	13,731
Chesapeake	22,063	62.99	6,917	19.75	2,165	6.18	2,818	8.05	337	0.96	209	0.60	163	0.47	88	0.25	97	0.28	50	0.14	54	0.15	23	0.07	22	0.06	14	0.04	4	0.01	35,024
Chesterfield	33,400	56.86	13,422	22.85	5,587	9.51	4,811	8.19	515	0.88	310	0.53	246	0.42	128	0.22	77	0.13	122	0.21	45	0.08	28	0.05	27	0.05	13	0.02	14	0.02	58,745
Clarke	1,209	51.40	526	22.36	249	10.59	275	11.69	28	1.19	31	1.32	19	0.81	6	0.26	1	0.04	5	0.21	1	0.04	1	0.04	0	0	1	0.04	0	0	2,352
Colonia Heights	716	49.45	402	27.76	123	8.49	130	8.98	27	1.86	10	0.69	12	0.83	7	0.48	10	0.69	5	0.35	2	0.14	1	0.07	2	0.14	1	0.07	0	0	1,448
Covington	241	60.40	86	21.55	27	6.77	29	7.27	6	1.50	3	0.75	3	0.75	2	0.50	1	0.25	0	0	0	0	1	0.25	0	0	0	0	0	0	399
Craig	166	46.50	95	26.61	40	11.20	33	9.24	10	2.80	2	0.56	4	1.12	2	0.56	2	0.56	2	0.56	0	0	0	0	0	0	1	0.28	0	0	357
Culpeper	2,642	53.16	1,203	24.21	409	8.23	543	10.93	47	0.95	41	0.82	36	0.72	12	0.24	10	0.20	9	0.18	5	0.10	3	0.06	6	0.12	3	0.06	1	0.02	4,970
Cumberland	696	68.91	164	16.24	57	5.64	62	6.14	6	0.59	6	0.59	6	0.59	4	0.40	4	0.40	3	0.30	2	0.20	0	0	0	0	0	0	0	0	1,010
Danville	3,879	71.85	748	13.85	170	3.15	463	8.58	25	0.46	14	0.26	24	0.44	6	0.11	25	0.46	15	0.28	12	0.22	9	0.17	8	0.15	1	0.02	0	0	5,399
Dickenson	313	55.69	178	31.67	15	2.67	32	5.69	7	1.25	4	0.71	4	0.71	4	0.71	2	0.36	1	0.18	1	0.18	0	0	1	0.18	0	0	0	0	562
Dinwiddie	2,366	73.05	466	14.39	93	2.87	235	7.26	14	0.43	18	0.56	12	0.37	7	0.22	10	0.31	2	0.06	8	0.25	4	0.12	3	0.09	1	0.03	0	0	3,239
Emporia	413	73.62	67	11.94	16	2.85	53	9.45	4	0.71	3	0.53	0	0	1	0.18	2	0.36	1	0.18	0	0	0	0	0	0	1	0.18	0	0	561
Essex	852	70.88	138	11.48	65	5.41	118	9.82	8	0.67	6	0.50	6	0.50	2	0.17	1	0.08	2	0.17	1	0.08	2	0.17	0	0	1	0.08	0	0	1,202
Fairfax (City)	2,674	45.11	1,561	26.33	783	13.21	666	11.23	61	1.03	67	1.13	73	1.23	24	0.40	6	0.10	2	0.03	5	0.08	2	0.03	3	0.05	1	0.02	0	0	5,928
Fairfax (County)	121,927	49.82	57,157	23.36	29,550	12.08	28,203	11.52	1,795	0.73	2,654	1.08	1,875	0.77	753	0.31	211	0.09	129	0.05	200	0.08	113	0.05	110	0.04	37	0.02	0	0	244,714
Falls Church	2,355	48.11	881	18.00	909	18.57	527	10.77	19	0.39	91	1.86	100	2.04	6	0.12	2	0.04	2	0.04	3	0.06	0	0	0	0	0	0	0	0	4,895
Fauquier	5,141	52.34	2,152	21.91	924	9.41	1,210	12.32	139	1.42	92	0.94	93	0.95	28	0.29	10	0.10	5	0.05	10	0.10	12	0.12	5	0.05	1	0.01	0	0	9,822
Floyd	628	35.36	740	41.67	231	13.01	108	6.08	24	1.35	9	0.51	20	1.13	2	0.11	3	0.17	4	0.23	1	0.06	4	0.23	2	0.11	0	0	0	0	1,776
Fluvanna	1,991	52.71	823	21.79	478	12.66	357	9.45	32	0.85	28	0.74	33	0.87	9	0.24	7	0.19	7	0.19	3	0.08	7	0.19	2	0.05	0	0	0	0	3,777
Franklin	848	69.00	173	14.08	49	3.99	129	10.50	10	0.81	3	0.24	2	0.16	1	0.08	4	0.33	2	0.16	4	0.33	1	0.08	3	0.24	0	0	0	0	1,229
Franklin	2,539	56.76	913	20.41	299	6.68	476	10.64	65	1.45	52	1.16	65	1.45	11	0.25	11	0.25	15	0.34	10	0.22	9	0.20	5	0.11	3	0.07	0	0	4,473
Frederick	4,417	50.71	2,214	25.42	806	9.25	892	10.24	135	1.55	89	1.02	67	0.77	36	0.41	8	0.09	20	0.23	6	0.07	11	0.13	2	0.02	8	0.09	0	0	8,711
Fredericksburg	2,126	45.77	1,263	27.19	641	13.80	439	9.45	48	1.03	66	1.42	22	0.47	13	0.28	12	0.26	3	0.06	3	0.06	5	0.11	2	0.04	0	0	2	0.04	4,645
Galax	173	52.74	82	25.00	20	6.10	39	11.89	6	1.83	4	1.22	0	0	0	0	1	0.30	0	0	0	0	0	0	2	0.61	1	0.30	0	0	328
Giles	541	47.29	332	29.02	113	9.88	97	8.48	25	2.19	7	0.61	7	0.61	8	0.70	3	0.26	5	0.44	1	0.09	1	0.09	2	0.17	2	0.17	0	0	1,144
Gloucester	2,165	54.06	912	22.77	354	8.84	411	10.26	52	1.30	36	0.90	24	0.60	12	0.30	7	0.17	9	0.22	9	0.22	8	0.20	4	0.10	2	0.05	0	0	4,005
Goochland	2,509	61.03	692	16.83	312	7.59	480	11.68	33	0.80	28	0.68	26	0.63	5	0.12	6	0.15	9	0.22	5	0.12	4	0.10	2	0.05	0	0	0	0	4,111
Grayson	425	54.14	182	23.18	76	9.68	60	7.64	13	1.66	11	1.40	10	1.27	3	0.38	0	0	4	0.51	0	0	1	0.13	0	0	0	0	0	0	785
Greene	916	46.43	526	26.66	253	12.82	190	9.63	31	1.57	25	1.27	17	0.86	5	0.25	3	0.15	2	0.10	2	0.10	2	0.10	1	0.05	0	0	0	0	1,973
Greensville	827	74.17	144	12.91	24	2.15	90	8.07	5	0.45	5	0.45	2	0.18	3	0.27	4	0.36	4	0.36	5	0.45	1	0.09	1	0.09	0	0	0	0	1,115
Halifax	2,324	72.85	465	14.58	102	3.20	226	7.08	11	0.34	12	0.38	17	0.53	3	0.09	8	0.25	6	0.19	8	0.25	5	0.16	2	0.06	1	0.03	0	0	3,190
Hampton	15,745	65.91	4,341	18.17	1,298	5.43	1,967	8.23	143	0.60	86	0.36	68	0.28	49	0.21	67	0.28	36	0.15	36	0.15	16	0.07	15	0.06	13	0.05	10	0.04	23,890
Hanover	8,328	54.14	3,490	22.69	1,645	10.70	1,314	8.54	225	1.46	112	0.73	119	0.77	41	0.27	24	0.16	21	0.14	18	0.12	21	0.14	9	0.06	6	0.04	8	0.05	15,381
Harrisonburg	2,090	32.24	2,591	39.97	1,387	21.39	249	3.84	50	0.77	40	0.62	37	0.57	15	0.23	7	0.11	6	0.09	6	0.09	1	0.02	3	0.05	1	0.02	0	0	6,483
Henrico	37,813	57.08	14,707	22.20	6,305	9.52	5,909	8.92	431	0.65	369	0.56	281	0.42	127	0.19	96	0.14	52	0.08	70	0.11	36	0.05	28	0.04	16	0.02	6	0.01	66,246
Henry	2,697	69.15	635	16.28	143	3.67	298	7.64	44	1.13	27	0.69	17	0.44	9	0.23	10	0.26	7	0.18	5	0.13	2	0.05	5	0.13	1	0.03	0	0	3,900
Highland	146	51.77	74	26.24	38	13.48	10	3.55	3	1.06	5	1.77	4	1.42	2	0.71	0	0	0	0	0	0	0	0	0	0	0	0	0	0	282
Hopewell	1,444	63.98	435	19.27	122	5.41	182	8.06	14	0.62	15	0.66	9	0.40	4	0.18	11	0.49	6	0.27	7	0.31	1	0.04	3	0.13	0	0	4	0.18	2,257
Isle of Wight	3,482	65.33	918	17.22	287	5.38	481	9.02	65	1.22	25	0.47	26	0.49	10	0.19	14	0.26	8	0.15	7	0.13	5	0.09	1	0.02	1	0.02	0	0	5,330
James City	9,154	57.70	2,577	16.24	1,578	9.95	1,986	12.52	168	1.06	174	1.10	142	0.90	23	0.14	13	0.08	22	0.14	10	0.06	7	0.04	3	0.02	6	0.04	1	0.01	15,864
King and Queen	551	67.11	136	16.57	47	5.72	66	8.04	8	0.97	3	0.37	3	0.37	1	0.12	3	0.37	0	0	0	0	3	0.37	0	0	0	0	0	0	821
King George	1,452	55.19	566	21.51	236	8.97	263	10.00	50	1.90	28	1.06	20	0.76	8	0.30	4	0.15	1	0.04	0	0	1	0.04	0	0	1	0.04	1	0.04	2,631
King William	1,049	60.60	330	19.06	112	6.47	175	10.11	12	0.69	7	0.40	12	0.69	9	0.52	3	0.17	8	0.46	5	0.29	4	0.23	0	0	5	0.29	0	0	1,731
Lancaster	1,212	64.47	240	12.77	98	5.21	253	13.46	12	0.64	27	1.44	21	1.12	1	0.05	4	0.21	4	0.21	2	0.11	1	0.05	3	0.16	2	0.11	0	0	1,880
Lee	308	60.63	121	23.82	26	5.12	31	6.10	3	0.59	2	0.39	6	1.18	0	0	2	0.39	4	0.79	4	0.79	1	0.20	0	0	0	0	0	0	508
Lexington	565	47.40	227	19.04	263	22.06	106	8.89	4	0.34	17	1.43	6	0.50	1	0.08	0	0	0	0	1	0.08	1	0.08	0	0	1	0.08	0	0	1,192
Loudoun	36,233	50.54	18,103	25.25	7,196	10.04	8,034	11.21	625	0.87	639	0.89	353	0.49	225	0.31	69	0.10	49	0.07	69	0.10	37	0.05	38	0.05	15	0.02	4	0.01	71,689
Louisa	2,523	56.97	897	20.25	385	8.69	457	10.32	64	1.45	26	0.59	34	0.77	9	0.20	9	0.20	7	0.16	5	0.11	8	0.18	2	0.05	3	0.07	0	0	4,429
Lunenburg	874	71.70	171	14.03	53	4.35	94	7.71	2	0.16	4	0.33	9	0.74	3	0.25	4	0.33	3	0.25	1	0.08	0	0	1	0.08	0	0	0	0	1,219
Lynchburg	4,836	56.88	1,806	21.24	791	9.30	773	9.09	105	1.24	40	0.47	47	0.55	36	0.42	19	0.22	12	0.14	17	0.20	6	0.07	7	0.08	2	0.02	5	0.06	8,502
Madison	756	52.94	308	21.57	151	10.57	156	10.92	20	1.40	12	0.84	17	1.19	2	0.14	1	0.07	1	0.07	2	0.14	1	0.07	1	0.07	0	0	0	0	1,428
Manassas	2,321	46.81	1,438	29.00	507	10.23	510	10.29	45	0.91	48	0.97	41	0.83	20	0.40	6	0.12	6	0.12	8	0.16	2	0.04	5	0.10	1	0.02	0	0	4,958
Manassas Park	765	44.37	593	34.40	159	9.22	141	8.18	5	0.29	24	1.39	13	0.75	8	0.46	7	0.41	3	0.17	2	0.12	2	0.12	1	0.06	1	0.06	0	0	1,724
Martinsville	1,117	67.62	267	16.16	54	3.27	178	10.77	10	0.61	4	0.24	8	0.48	4	0.24	2	0.12	3	0.18	2	0.12	0	0	1	0.06	0	0	2	0.12	1,652
Mathews	608	55.63	211	19.30	89	8.14	133	12.17	13	1.19	15	1.37	9	0.82	5	0.46	3	0.27	1	0.09	4	0.37	0	0	0	0	2	0.18	0	0	1,093
Mecklenburg	2,111	66.05	491	15.36	173	5.41	292	9.14	34	1.06	20	0.63	28	0.88	7	0.22	14	0.44	4	0.13	8	0.25	8	0.25	4	0.13	2	0.06	0	0	3,196
Middlesex	863	61.38	256	18.21	89	6.33	149	10.60	12	0.85	12	0.85	14	1.00	0	0	3	0.21	1	0.07	2	0.14	1	0.07	2	0.14	2	0.14	0	0	1,406
Montgomery	5,560	38.78	5,093	35.52	2,393	16.69	866	6.04	137	0.96	111	0.77	94	0.66	38	0.27	9	0.06	18	0.13	9	0.06	7	0.05	1	0.01	2	0.01	0	0	14,338
Nelson	1,340	53.15	560	22.21	303	12.02	229	9.08	28	1.11	28	1.11	17	0.67	3	0.12	3	0.12	3	0.12	2	0.08	4	0.16	1	0.04	0	0	0	0	2,521
New Kent	1,583	59.71	477	17.99	211	7.96	279	10.52	34	1.28	19	0.72	15	0.57	12	0.45	7	0.26	3	0.11	5	0.19	2	0.08	2	0.08	0	0	2	0.08	2,651
Newport News	15,607	61.31	5,286	20.77	1,639	6.44	2,252	8.85	185	0.73	131	0.51	111	0.44	60	0.24	52	0.20	41	0.16	45	0.18	14	0.05	13	0.05	11	0.04	8	0.03	25,455
Norfolk	18,873	56.11	8,106	24.10	2,737	8.14	3,059	9.09	246	0.73	212	0.63	137	0.41	70	0.21	70	0.21	33	0.10	38	0.11	25	0.07	21	0.06	3	0.01	8	0.02	33,638
Northampton	1,150	63.85	284	15.77	83	4.61	227	12.60	9	0.50	18	1.00	17	0.94	2	0.11	4	0.22	3	0.17	3	0.17	1	0.06	0	0	0	0	0	0	1,801
Northumberland	1,061	66.11	178	11.09	90	5.61	203	12.65	20	1.25	14	0.87	25	1.56	3	0.19	3	0.19	3	0.19	5	0.31	0	0	0	0	0	0	0	0	1,605
Norton	74	47.44	52	33.33	13	8.33	10	6.41	4	2.56	0	0	2	1.28	0	0	0	0	0	0	1	0.64	0	0	0	0	0	0	0	0	156
Nottoway	884	64.06	233	16.88	72	5.22	119	8.62	10	0.72	10	0.72	13	0.94	3	0.22	3	0.22	2	0.14	4	0.29	3	0.22	1	0.07	0	0	23	1.67	1,380
Orange	2,222	53.32	911	21.86	379	9.10	479	11.50	47	1.13	36	0.86	53	1.27	8	0.19	4	0.10	7	0.17	9	0.22	7	0.17	3	0.07	2	0.05	0	0	4,167
Page	693	52.30	325	24.53	116	8.75	128	9.66	21	1.58	15	1.13	16	1.21	5	0.38	2	0.15	0	0	0	0	2	0.15	2	0.15	0	0	0	0	1,325
Patrick	550	50.74	252	23.25	87	8.03	121	11.16	20	1.85	13	1.20	12	1.11	6	0.55	7	0.65	6	0.55	2	0.18	3	0.28	3	0.28	2	0.18	0	0	1,084
Petersburg	3,930	73.46	718	13.42	190	3.55	438	8.19	9	0.17	14	0.26	12	0.22	4	0.07	8	0.15	5	0.09	6	0.11	3	0.06	3	0.06	1	0.02	9	0.17	5,350
Pittsylvania	3,472	68.49	815	16.08	187	3.69	416	8.21	38	0.75	14	0.28	33	0.65	17	0.34	26	0.51	21	0.41	14	0.28	8	0.16	4	0.08	4	0.08	0	0	5,069
Poquoson	631	47.27	355	26.59	111	8.31	144	10.79	39	2.92	15	1.12	20	1.50	4	0.30	2	0.15	4	0.30	1	0.07	2	0.15	3	0.22	4	0.30	0	0	1,335
Portsmouth	10,189	65.94	2,753	17.82	746	4.83	1,431	9.26	76	0.49	57	0.37	51	0.33	24	0.16	41	0.27	21	0.14	29	0.19	13	0.08	6	0.04	3	0.02	12	0.08	15,452
Powhatan	1,812	56.24	699	21.69	272	8.44	324	10.06	47	1.46	29	0.90	23	0.71	7	0.22	1	0.03	3	0.09	1	0.03	1	0.03	3	0.09	0	0	0	0	3,222
Prince Edward	1,453	63.51	350	15.30	230	10.05	189	8.26	16	0.70	15	0.66	10	0.44	4	0.17	8	0.35	3	0.13	5	0.22	3	0.13	1	0.04	1	0.04	0	0	2,288
Prince George	2,418	67.83	636	17.84	169	4.74	245	6.87	31	0.87	13	0.36	14	0.39	8	0.22	11	0.31	4	0.11	5	0.14	5	0.14	3	0.08	2	0.06	1	0.03	3,565
Prince William	37,406	53.02	18,405	26.09	5,716	8.10	7,019	9.95	566	0.80	514	0.73	374	0.53	205	0.29	90	0.13	52	0.07	77	0.11	43	0.06	64	0.09	16	0.02	10	0.01	70,557
Pulaski	1,220	52.59	585	25.22	192	8.28	245	10.56	29	1.25	17	0.73	10	0.43	8	0.34	2	0.09	2	0.09	3	0.13	3	0.13	2	0.09	1	0.04	1	0.04	2,320
Radford	705	39.36	654	36.52	240	13.40	124	6.92	24	1.34	19	1.06	12	0.67	5	0.28	1	0.06	2	0.11	3	0.17	1	0.06	1	0.06	0	0	0	0	1,791
Rappahannock	676	50.75	331	24.85	124	9.31	133	9.98	14	1.05	24	1.80	21	1.58	1	0.08	1	0.08	1	0.08	3	0.23	2	0.15	0	0	1	0.08	0	0	1,332
Richmond (City)	24,360	43.73	19,006	34.12	7,779	13.96	3,609	6.48	255	0.46	234	0.42	156	0.28	92	0.17	63	0.11	31	0.06	51	0.09	35	0.06	13	0.02	12	0.02	14	0.03	55,710
Richmond (County)	444	70.03	81	12.78	40	6.31	54	8.52	8	1.26	3	0.47	1	0.16	0	0	0	0	0	0	0	0	2	0.32	1	0.16	0	0	0	0	634
Roanoke (City)	6,824	51.25	3,490	26.21	1,513	11.36	1,161	8.72	77	0.58	97	0.73	62	0.47	26	0.20	20	0.15	16	0.12	19	0.14	5	0.04	1	0.01	5	0.04	0	0	13,316
Roanoke (County)	6,009	52.73	2,730	23.96	1,142	10.02	1,148	10.07	145	1.27	75	0.66	59	0.52	20	0.18	12	0.11	16	0.14	9	0.08	15	0.13	6	0.05	4	0.04	5	0.04	11,395
Rockbridge	1,569	55.40	533	18.82	320	11.30	311	10.98	31	1.09	29	1.02	33	1.17	3	0.11	1	0.04	1	0.04	1	0.04	0	0	0	0	0	0	0	0	2,832
Rockingham	3,402	48.08	1,924	27.19	1,022	14.44	445	6.29	106	1.50	52	0.73	65	0.92	25	0.35	7	0.10	15	0.21	2	0.03	7	0.10	4	0.06	0	0	0	0	7,076
Russell	542	54.64	291	29.33	45	4.54	66	6.65	11	1.11	5	0.50	11	1.11	1	0.10	7	0.71	4	0.40	3	0.30	2	0.20	1	0.10	3	0.30	0	0	992
Salem	1,312	50.36	689	26.45	275	10.56	238	9.14	21	0.81	17	0.65	16	0.61	11	0.42	2	0.08	12	0.46	4	0.15	6	0.23	1	0.04	1	0.04	0	0	2,605
Scott	324	51.76	201	32.11	38	6.07	37	5.91	7	1.12	4	0.64	5	0.80	1	0.16	0	0	6	0.96	0	0	0	0	2	0.32	1	0.16	0	0	626
Shenandoah	1,703	50.34	882	26.07	346	10.23	312	9.22	41	1.21	24	0.71	30	0.89	14	0.41	8	0.24	9	0.27	5	0.15	4	0.12	4	0.12	1	0.03	0	0	3,383
Smyth	629	53.67	315	26.88	80	6.83	85	7.25	18	1.54	12	1.02	7	0.60	3	0.26	8	0.68	5	0.43	2	0.17	3	0.26	4	0.34	1	0.09	0	0	1,172
Southampton	1,325	68.30	285	14.69	73	3.76	196	10.10	9	0.46	16	0.82	12	0.62	4	0.21	4	0.21	3	0.15	5	0.26	4	0.21	4	0.21	0	0	0	0	1,940
Spotsylvania	9,243	54.54	4,002	23.62	1,327	7.83	1,729	10.20	198	1.17	154	0.91	117	0.69	50	0.30	40	0.24	26	0.15	22	0.13	20	0.12	8	0.05	10	0.06	0	0	16,946
Stafford	11,613	54.68	5,091	23.97	1,724	8.12	2,015	9.49	307	1.45	162	0.76	122	0.57	79	0.37	36	0.17	25	0.12	25	0.12	21	0.10	15	0.07	4	0.02	0	0	21,239
Staunton	1,754	42.90	1,189	29.08	716	17.51	246	6.02	47	1.15	43	1.05	59	1.44	11	0.27	6	0.15	11	0.27	1	0.02	3	0.07	3	0.07	0	0	0	0	4,089
Suffolk	10,029	68.09	2,380	16.16	735	4.99	1,241	8.43	120	0.81	53	0.36	55	0.37	26	0.18	33	0.22	15	0.10	23	0.16	11	0.07	4	0.03	3	0.02	0	0	14,728
Surry	977	71.52	207	15.15	49	3.59	103	7.54	7	0.51	1	0.07	7	0.51	1	0.07	0	0	1	0.07	6	0.44	2	0.15	2	0.15	0	0	3	0.22	1,366
Sussex	1,015	77.48	146	11.15	21	1.60	95	7.25	2	0.15	7	0.53	6	0.46	2	0.15	5	0.38	2	0.15	4	0.31	2	0.15	1	0.08	2	0.15	0	0	1,310
Tazewell	749	51.55	404	27.80	91	6.26	95	6.54	34	2.34	18	1.24	19	1.31	7	0.48	9	0.62	11	0.76	10	0.69	3	0.21	2	0.14	1	0.07	0	0	1,453
Virginia Beach	33,528	54.87	14,624	23.93	4,471	7.32	6,467	10.58	716	1.17	458	0.75	339	0.55	157	0.26	86	0.14	97	0.16	64	0.10	34	0.06	33	0.05	20	0.03	14	0.02	61,108
Warren	1,583	47.77	901	27.19	344	10.38	334	10.08	58	1.75	32	0.97	14	0.42	12	0.36	12	0.36	6	0.18	8	0.24	8	0.24	0	0	1	0.03	1	0.03	3,314
Washington	1,602	51.48	820	26.35	311	9.99	258	8.29	30	0.96	37	1.19	20	0.64	12	0.39	6	0.19	10	0.32	1	0.03	3	0.10	1	0.03	1	0.03	0	0	3,112
Waynesboro	1,320	48.12	779	28.40	321	11.70	203	7.40	34	1.24	24	0.87	25	0.91	10	0.36	9	0.33	5	0.18	7	0.26	4	0.15	1	0.04	1	0.04	0	0	2,743
Westmoreland	1,438	65.57	345	15.73	105	4.79	246	11.22	28	1.28	5	0.23	11	0.50	3	0.14	2	0.09	1	0.05	3	0.14	3	0.14	2	0.09	1	0.05	0	0	2,193
Williamsburg	1,435	40.23	1,133	31.76	626	17.55	281	7.88	21	0.59	30	0.84	18	0.50	7	0.20	2	0.06	4	0.11	4	0.11	5	0.14	0	0	1	0.03	0	0	3,567
Winchester	1,666	47.42	979	27.87	413	11.76	321	9.14	26	0.74	38	1.08	38	1.08	13	0.37	5	0.14	2	0.06	6	0.17	2	0.06	3	0.09	1	0.03	0	0	3,513
Wise	552	44.05	469	37.43	113	9.02	69	5.51	12	0.96	13	1.04	13	1.04	2	0.16	2	0.16	3	0.24	4	0.32	0	0	1	0.08	0	0	0	0	1,253
Whythe	657	47.16	424	30.44	134	9.62	114	8.18	13	0.93	17	1.22	14	1.01	5	0.36	2	0.14	4	0.29	2	0.14	2	0.14	0	0	1	0.07	4	0.29	1,393
York	5,641	56.46	2,006	20.08	933	9.34	1,003	10.04	137	1.37	102	1.02	74	0.74	33	0.33	16	0.16	16	0.16	8	0.08	15	0.15	4	0.04	2	0.02	1	0.01	9,991
Total	705,501	53.30	306,388	23.15	142,546	10.77	128,030	9.67	11,288	0.85	11,199	0.85	8,414	0.64	3,361	0.25	1,910	0.14	1,472	0.11	1,437	0.11	902	0.07	691	0.05	370	0.03	184	0.01	1,323,693

== Notes ==
Additional candidates
