= Laurel Libby =

American politician (born 1981)

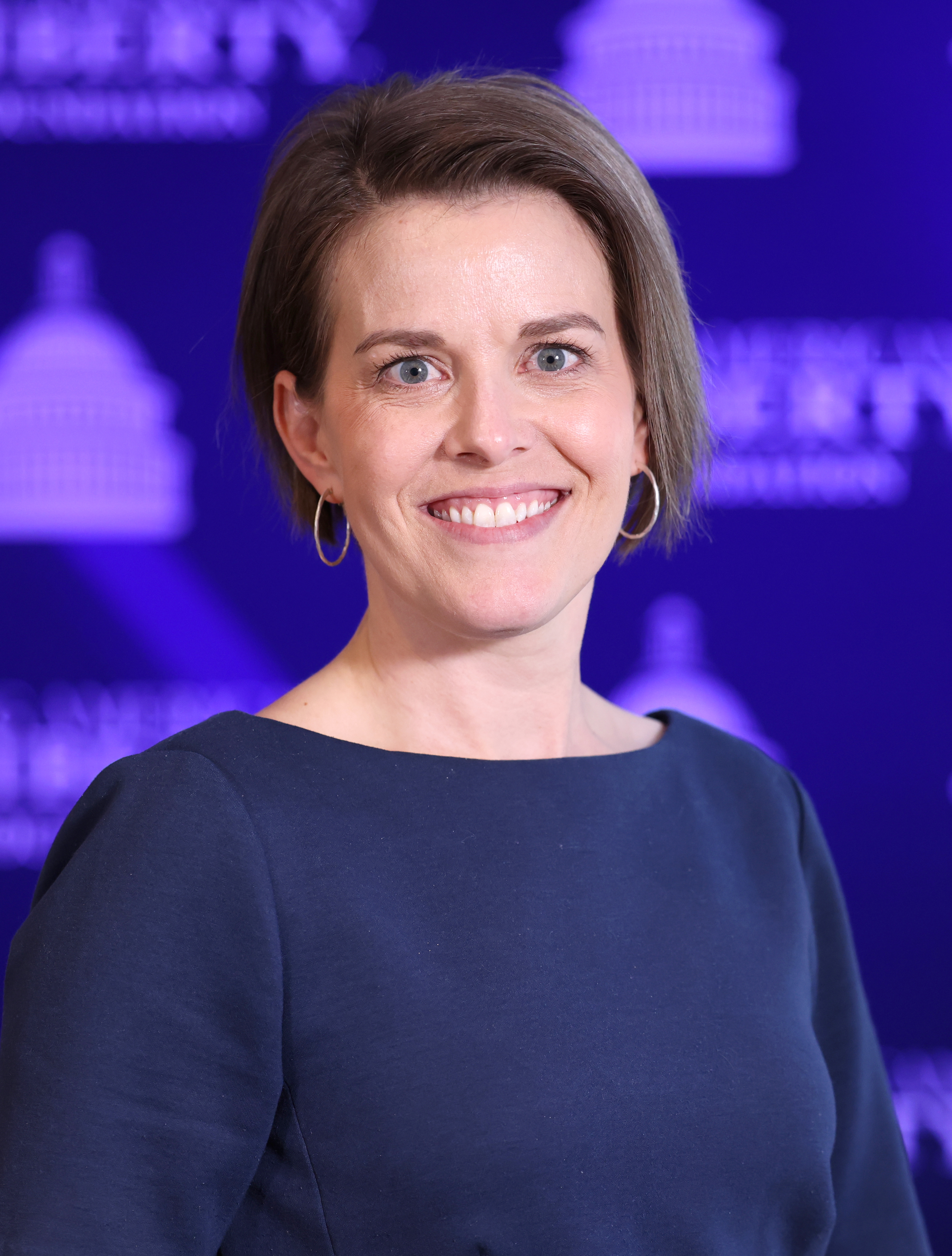
- Libby in 2024

Member of the Maine House of Representatives
- Incumbent
- Assumed office December 2020
- Preceded by: Bettyann Sheats
- Constituency: 64th district (2020–2022); 90th district (2022–present)

Personal details
- Born: Laurel Dawson Munsell; May 15, 1981 (age 45) Bangor, Maine, U.S.
- Party: Republican
- Spouse: John Libby
- Children: 5
- Education: Roberts Wesleyan University (BS)
- Website: Campaign website

Laurel Dawson Libby (née Munsell; born May 15, 1981) is an American politician, interior designer, and former nurse. A Republican, she is currently the representative for Maine House District 90, representing Minot and part of Auburn. She was elected to the Maine House in November 2020, 2022 and 2024.

Libby was a leader of the 2020 people's veto campaign opposing childhood vaccination laws in Maine and protested public health measures implemented to prevent the spread of COVID-19. Libby was one of seven conservative House Members to be stripped of their committee assignments over refusal to comply with mask mandates in the State House during the COVID-19 pandemic. In 2025, Libby was stripped of her voting and speaking rights on the House floor after being censured for a social media post that criticized the participation of transgender athletes in girls' sports. Her voting rights were later restored by the U.S. Supreme Court pending the outcome of litigation.

In November 2025, Libby announced that she would not seek reelection in 2026, choosing to focus her efforts as the executive director of Lead Maine, a political action committee focused on electing conservative Republicans.

== Early life and education ==
Born Laurel Dawson Munsell in Bangor, Maine, she grew up in a large family. She attended Roberts Wesleyan College where she studied nursing, was in the nursing honor society, and competed in women's cross country. She graduated with a Bachelor of Science in Nursing in 2003. She worked as an ICU nurse at both Maine Medical Center and at St. Mary's Regional Medical Center and was a member of the MA-1 Medical Disaster Relief team, travelling to Puerto Rico in 2017 as part of the hurricane relief effort.

== Activism ==
=== Anti-vaccine campaign ===
Libby opposed LD 798, Maine's 2019 law eliminating religious and philosophical exemptions for childhood vaccinations, and was a leader in the 2020 people's veto campaign to overturn it. She testified against the bill while it was in committee, describing an alleged reaction experienced by her son that was not treated or documented by a medical provider. Libby explained that she would not be further vaccinating him or two of her other children, and that if the law were to pass and eliminate religious and philosophical exemptions to school-required vaccinations, she and her family would be moving out of Maine.

When LD #798 passed, Libby canvassed for Mainers for Health and Parental Rights in the effort to get a people's veto of the new law on the statewide ballot in March 2020. The veto attempt failed 27%–73%. Days after the referendum vote, Libby testified in committee against LD #2117 "An Act To Expand and Rename the Controlled Substances Prescription Monitoring Program".

=== COVID-19 response ===
In December 2020, Libby published an opinion piece in the Lewiston Sun Journal opposing lockdowns in long-term care facilities during the COVID-19 pandemic in Maine. In January 2021, she was criticized along with another representative for wearing a "chin shield", rather than a face covering, while conducting business on the Maine State House property, where CDC-approved face coverings were mandatory COVID-19 precautions. The criticism prompted House leaders to clarify and reiterate which face coverings were acceptable for conducting State House duties. While most meetings and committee hearings of the 130th Maine legislature were held remotely during the pandemic, Libby participated from her seat on the House floor.

In August 2021, Libby spoke at an Augusta, Maine, rally opposing a new statewide COVID-19 vaccination requirement for Maine healthcare employees, declaring "To be clear, this is war!". She encouraged healthcare employees to walk away from their jobs rather than become vaccinated.

=== Lead Maine ===
In November 2025, Libby created Lead Maine, a new political action committee focused on electing conservative Republicans in the state. She also created a federal super PAC, the Lead Maine Committee, in partnership with Sentinel Action Fund. Lead Maine officially launched in Lewiston, Maine in January 2026, when Libby also debuted her new podcast, “Speak Up with Laurel Libby." She is the executive director of Lead Maine, saying it was founded because "too many Mainers feel ignored, sidelined, or intimidated into silence."

In June 2026, Lead Maine petitioned the Maine Department of Health and Human Services in a bid to require new rules in the MaineCare program. The petition proposes new anti-fraud rules that the PAC says would strengthen oversight of MaineCare providers and taxpayer dollars.

== Maine House ==
Libby announced her candidacy for Maine House District 64 in May 2020, challenging incumbent Bettyann Sheats. Her campaign was endorsed by the NRA Political Victory Fund, the Make Liberty Win PAC, and the Christian Civic League of Maine; and supported by the Don't Tread on Maine PAC; the Women's Leadership Fund; former Maine gubernatorial candidate Shawn Moody; Bruce Poliquin; and Susan Collins' Dirigo PAC, as well as several fellow anti-vaccination activists from the 2020 people's veto campaign. Libby did not incorporate or mention her anti-vaccine activism while campaigning for the House.

Libby co-sponsored a bill proposed by Representative Heidi Sampson of Alfred seeking to enact the Stop Guilt by Accusation Act, a measure which requires media organizations to follow up on stories involving accused crimes. The bill has been proposed and defeated in several other U.S. states and was defeated in committee on May 5, 2021.

Libby served on the Judiciary committee from December 2020 until May 2021 when she and fellow representatives Heidi Sampson, Sherman Hutchins, Chris Johansen, Michael Lemelin, Jim Thorne, and John Andrews entered the Maine State House without required face coverings. The group was stopped by Capitol Police and asked to put on masks, but they refused to do so, requesting a meeting with the House Speaker Ryan Fecteau to clarify a ruling by the Legislative Council requiring the masks at the State House despite a statewide lift on the mask mandate. When the legislators' request for an audience with the Speaker was denied, they continued past capitol police and entered the State House. All seven lawmakers were relieved of their committee assignments effective May 25, 2021. Shortly after the incident, Libby posted a fundraising plea on her official Facebook page, drawing ire from Fecteau and some constituents.

== Controversies ==
=== Neo-Nazi rally comments ===
In April 2024, as the Maine House debated LD 2130, "An Act to Prohibit Unauthorized Military Training", Libby posed a rhetorical question regarding the legality of Nazi activity:

“Let's talk about the Nazis. I would like to know, although I'm not posing a question through the chair, I would like to know what they did that was illegal. I would like to know what they did, in detail if folks would like to share, that was wrong, that infringed on another person's right. Holding a rally, and even holding a rally with guns, is not illegal."

A clip of her remarks went viral, sparking outrage and reaching a number of national news outlets in the United States.

=== Transgender athlete post and legislative censure ===
Libby attracted attention in 2025 for sharing a Facebook post about a transgender athlete competing in and winning a girl's pole-vaulting competition, including the athlete's name and photo. Libby criticized the athlete's inclusion on the team, saying in an interview with WMTW TV "Girls' sports has come a long way and I think we have a responsibility to protect girls' sports, to protect Maine girls, and to ensure they have a level playing field."

Libby was subsequently censured by the House along party lines over the post and was denied the right to speak or vote in the House until she apologized. House Speaker Ryan Fecteau said that the post could create health and safety issues. Libby and several of her constituents appealed her suspension to federal court, seeking reinstatement of her speaking and voting rights. Libby and her constituents argued that the restrictions violated Libby's right to free speech and deprived her constituents of their vote. U.S. District Court Judge Melissa DuBose ruled against Libby's request for a preliminary injunction to prevent the sanction, citing legislative immunity from litigation. The First Circuit Court of Appeals in Boston denied her request for an emergency stay. Libby subsequently appealed to the United States Supreme Court. On May 20, 2025, the Supreme Court ordered the Maine legislature to restore Libby's voting rights while her appeal is pending. Libby subsequently asked the First Circuit Court of Appeals to restore her speaking rights in the legislature while the appeal is pending as well. On June 25, 2025, the Maine House voted to restore Libby's speaking rights. The suit was ultimately dropped as the restoration of her voting and speaking rights rendered the issue moot.

== Fundraising and national affiliations ==
Libby participates actively with Club for Growth, Young Americans for Liberty and the Leadership Institute. She is a prominent fundraiser in Maine and controls two political action committees, Fight for Freedom and Dinner Table Action, which fund efforts to elect Republicans throughout the state. She has used PAC funds to purchase firearms to raffle to supporters as part of her fundraising efforts.

== Personal life ==
Libby attends East Auburn Baptist Church in Auburn. She enjoys running and design, and owns and operates Dawson Interiors, a decorating and real estate staging business.

She has been married to John Libby, a physical therapist, since 2005. They have five children.

== Electoral record ==
2020 Maine House district 64 Republican primary
Party	Candidate	Votes	%
Republican	Laurel Libby	606	100.0%
Total votes		606	100.0%

2020 Maine House district 64 general election
Party	Candidate	Votes	%
Republican	Laurel Libby	2,949	54.4%
Democratic	Bettyann Sheats	2,471	45.6%
Total votes		4,743	100.0%

2022 Maine House district 90 Republican primary
Party	Candidate	Votes	%
Republican	Laurel Libby	345	100.0%
Total votes		345	100.0%

2022 Maine House district 90 general election
Party	Candidate	Votes	%
Republican	Laurel Libby	3,075	100.0%
Total votes		3,075	100.0%

2024 Maine House district 90 Republican primary
Party	Candidate	Votes	%
Republican	Laurel Libby	473	100.0%
Total votes		473	100.0%

2024 Maine House district 90 general election
Party	Candidate	Votes	%
Republican	Laurel Libby	2,817	51.6%
Democratic	Daniel Campbell	2,646	48.4%
Total votes		5,463	100.0%
