= Becker College =

Private college in Worcester, Massachusetts, US

Coordinates: 42.2685°N 71.8119°W

- Type: Private college
- Active: 1784; 242 years ago–2021
- Academic affiliations: NAICU, HECCMA
- Location: Worcester and Leicester, Massachusetts, United States
- Campus: Urban and Classic New England
- Colors: Blue
- Nickname: Hawks
- Sporting affiliations: CCC, ECFC, NEWLA, HEVGA
- Website: www.becker.edu

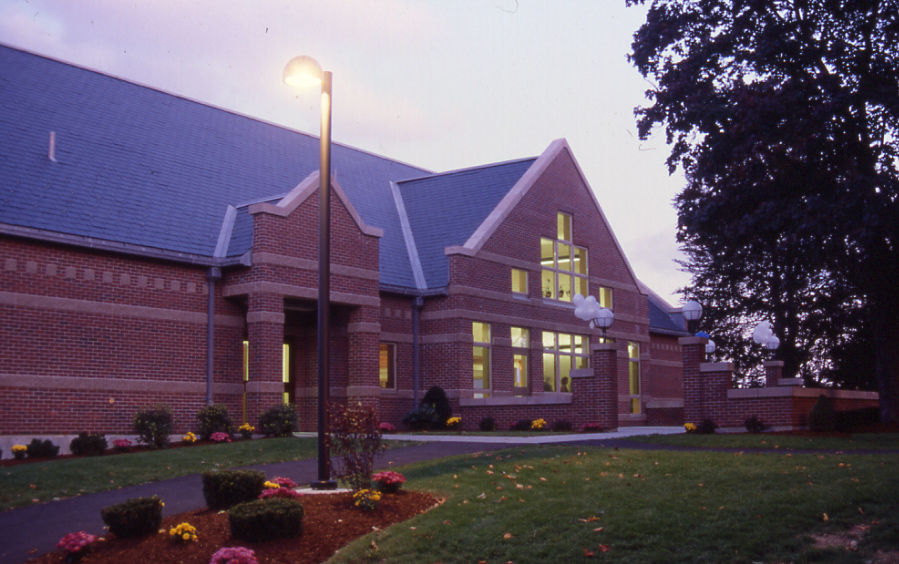
Becker College, Leicester Campus Center

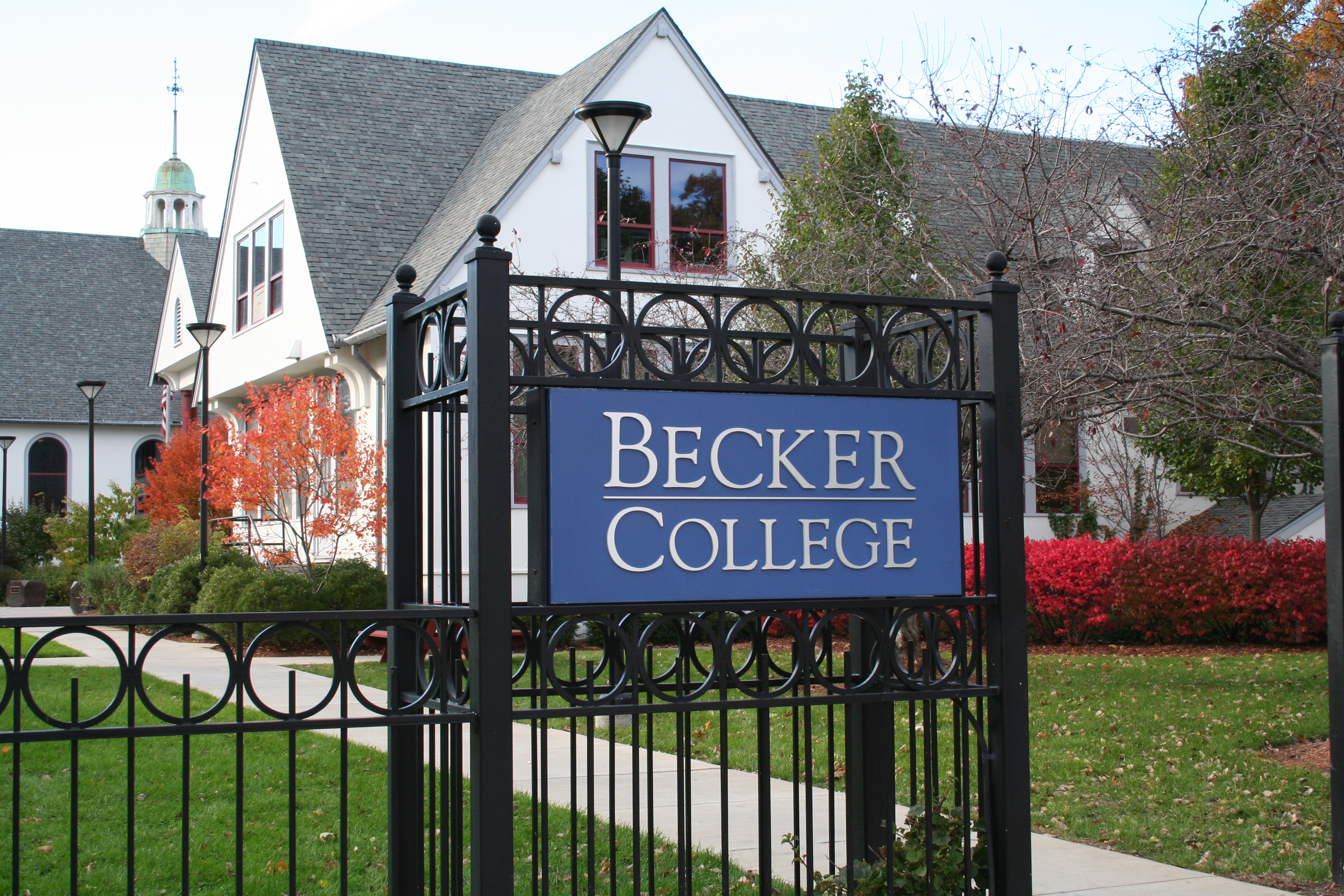
Becker College, Worcester Campus Quad

Becker College was a private college in Worcester and Leicester, Massachusetts. Becker College traced its history from the union of two Massachusetts educational institutions—one founded in 1784 and the other in 1887. The college closed at the end of the 2020–21 academic year. Following the closure, nearby Clark University opened the Becker School of Design and Technology, carrying on Becker's game design programs with many of the same faculty.

The college offered more than 40 undergraduate degree programs including nursing programs, a veterinary science program, and video game design and development programs. The college's 2016–17 enrollment was 1,892. Becker College has more than 21,000 alumni.

== History ==
The institution comprised two separate campuses located six miles apart, each with its own residence halls, library, dining hall and academic facilities.

=== Leicester ===
Becker's Leicester campus was home to Leicester Academy, founded in 1784. The campus was situated within the town common, which in the 18th century, consisted of a tavern, a meetinghouse and the first home built in Leicester, now known as the May House.

Colonel Ebenezer Crafts of Sturbridge and Jacob Davis of Charlton saw a need to provide schooling for children of modest families who lived in Central Massachusetts. The state legislature was petitioned, funds were raised and, in 1784, Leicester Academy was founded. The charter was signed by Governor John Hancock, and Samuel Adams, President of the Massachusetts State Senate; major benefactors included Moses Gill, a future lieutenant governor. It was the third academy founded in post-independence Massachusetts, after the founding of Governor Dummer Academy at Byfield in 1782 and of Phillips Academy at Andover in 1778.

Samuel C. Crafts, son of the founder, Ephraim Allen of Sturbridge and Samuel Swan of Leicester were members of the inaugural class. All three later graduated from Harvard College.

The Leicester Academy became defunct in 1917. According to the Massachusetts Department of Higher Education, Leicester Academy existed until 1952, when it became Leicester Junior College.

=== Worcester ===
Three years after the Leicester Academy centennial, in 1887, Becker's Business College was founded.

Edward Carl Anton (E.C.A.) Becker founded Becker College in Worcester, Massachusetts, in 1887 and served as its president from 1887 through 1907.

Becker was born in Peoria, Illinois, on April 30, 1855. He attended Peoria Bryant & Stratton Business College, graduating from both the business and telegraph departments. Following graduation, he served as a teacher and principal at the college. He went on to purchase and manage the Rockford Business College in Rockford, Illinois, and the Freeport Business College in Elgin, Illinois.

After Becker's successes in the Midwest, he moved east, managing a school in Pottsville, Pennsylvania, before arriving in Worcester to lead the business department at Hinman College. In 1887 he established Becker's Business College in the Clark building at 492 Main Street in Worcester. On opening day, one student showed up. By the end of the week 30 were in attendance. The college offered courses in bookkeeping, penmanship, arithmetic, shorthand and typing for both men and women.

E.C.A. Becker was a member of the Worcester Board of Trade and the Worcester Economic Club. In his free time he enjoyed hunting in Maine, a hobby showcased by two large moose heads that adorned the Becker reception office until the early 1930s. He was also known to have had a pleasant sense of humor.

Upon his death in 1907, the college had an average annual enrollment of 200 students. Graduates excelled in the counting rooms of Worcester's manufacturing and mercantile establishments and on their civil service examinations.

In 1907, E.C.A. Becker's wife Mary Charlotte Becker formed a corporation to manage the college, serving as treasurer, with son-in-law Walter S. Doud as president, and daughter Eva M. as clerk.

In 1938 the Medical Secretarial course was introduced and became a national model that attracted a number of students. With a critical need for student housing in the area, in 1939 the college purchased a late-Victorian house, built in 1893 on Cedar Street. This home became the first Becker dormitory.

=== Campus mergers ===
In 1974, Becker and Leicester began working together to expand academic offerings and provide broader social and recreational opportunities for their students. As a result of their close cooperation, the two were formally consolidated in 1977 as the Worcester campus and Leicester campus of Becker College.

In 2010, Robert E. Johnson assumed the presidency of the college. In April 2011, the Commonwealth of Massachusetts designated Becker as the home of the Massachusetts Digital Games Institute (MassDiGI). The Massachusetts Digital Games Institute (MassDiGI) was a statewide center, designated by the Commonwealth, for academic cooperation, entrepreneurship, and economic development across the Massachusetts digital and video games ecosystem.

In 2014, the college launched its first master's degree, a Master of Arts in mental health counseling. The following year, the college signed a memorandum of understanding with Nobel Laureate Professor Muhammad Yunus to establish the Yunus Social Business Centre @ Becker College. The centre was established in partnership with the Seven Hills Foundation and focused on identifying real-world social problems and creating innovative, self-sustaining solutions to transform lives and communities.

In May 2017, Becker College welcomed its 11th president, Nancy P. Crimmin.

== Closure ==
In March 2021, Massachusetts Department of Higher Education said the college's financial situation had become "sufficiently uncertain" to threaten its long-term viability. The statement added that the department "believes that the institution is unlikely to sustain full operations through the next academic year". A few weeks later, college trustees announced that the school would, indeed, close. They said that because of losses sustained during the COVID-19 pandemic, the college would have had to severely curtail its programs, sell assets and take on additional debt to stay open past the end of the spring 2021 semester. In May 2021, the college announced plans to lay off 329 employees at the end of the 2020–2021 academic year, at which point it closed permanently. Following the closure, nearby Clark University opened the Becker School of Design and Technology, carrying on Becker's globally recognized game design programs with many of the same faculty.

== Academics ==
Becker offered more than 40 degree programs ranging from Animal Sciences and Criminal Justice and Game Design to Nursing and Veterinary Sciences. Becker had a total of 419 faculty and staff, representing a 17:1 student/faculty ratio. The college offered Bachelor, Associate, and Master Degree Programs. In 2014 Becker College launched its first graduate degree - a Master of Arts in mental health counseling. A Master of Fine Arts in Interactive Media Design was also offered. All programs were fully accredited through the New England Commission of Higher Education (NECHE).

In 2016, 100% of Becker nursing students passed their Registered Nurses examination.

The game design program at Becker was consistently recognized on The Princeton Review's list of top undergraduate schools to study game design. In 2016, the program was ranked at number five. By the time the College closed in 2021, the program was ranked number two.

== Massachusetts Digital Games Institute ==
The Massachusetts Digital Games Institute (MassDiGI) was a statewide center, designated by the Commonwealth, for academic cooperation, entrepreneurship and economic development across the Massachusetts digital and video games ecosystem. Established in 2011 and based at Becker College, MassDiGI was the result of creative collaboration among academia, industry and government, aimed at fostering the growth of the game industry and innovation economy.

After Becker College closed in 2021, MassDigi continued to operate, from a new home at the nearby Worcester Polytechnic Institute.

== Campus ==
Both campuses occupy historic districts with buildings listed on the National Register of Historic Places. The Worcester campus was located on Sever Street in the residential Elm Park neighborhood, not far from downtown Worcester, which is about 40 miles west of Boston. Purchased in 1854 using public funds, Elm Park is recognized as one of the first purchases of land for a public park in the United States. The campus area belonged to the Lincoln family (noted for governors Levi Lincoln Sr. and Levi Lincoln Jr., and much of it is in the Lincoln Estate-Elm Park Historic District, which includes some historic properties owned by the college. The Leicester campus was adjacent to the historic center of that town, and a number of buildings on that campus are included in the Washburn Square-Leicester Common Historic District.

=== Worcester ===
Classes are held in the Arnold C. Weller Academic Building (former site of the Bancroft School) and the Health Science Center on the Sever Street Quad, as well as in the Design Center (Graphic, Interior and Game) on Cedar Street, which also houses a Mac Lab and motion-capture suite. A multi-purpose gymnasium and dining hall are features of the Gilbert R. Boutin Student Center, and within three blocks on Cedar Street are six of the 11 residence halls found on the Worcester campus, Merrill, Davis, Lincoln, Colton (Becker's first residence hall in Worcester, purchased in 1939), Cedar, and Willow Hall, a brick apartment-style building. Beeches, Miller, Maple, and Bullock Halls also serve dormitories. Lining Roxbury Street are office buildings, campus police and the Collaborative Learning Center, in former homes and typical "three-deckers" for which Worcester is famous.

On Worcester's quad is a monument commemorating the pitching of the first perfect game in professional baseball, on June 12, 1880, by Lee Richmond of Worcester, against Cleveland, in a National League game. The game took place on the Worcester Agricultural Fairgrounds, where the college, and much of the neighborhood, now stands.

=== Leicester ===
The Leicester campus was in a traditional, rural setting, located six miles west of Worcester. Students are shuttled between Leicester and Worcester for classes and events. The historic Leicester Common was a centerpiece to the campus, which includes three historic buildings, once stately homes that the college transitioned into residence halls, Lane, Winslow and Hitchcock. Behind those halls, on Old Main Street, are the Leicester gymnasium and the Lenfest Animal Health Center, the college's veterinary teaching clinic, which was open to the public for appointments during the academic year. Around "the grove" are the Borger Academic Center which houses classrooms, laboratories and the Daniels Hall auditorium, Marsh Hall (classrooms, offices and the Collaborative Learning Center); Susan E. Knight Hall (dining hall, rooms and offices) and the Leicester Student Center. The Leicester campus was also home to many of the college's athletic teams that play home games on Alumni Field. The equestrian team practice and host competitions at the Becker Equestrian Center in nearby Paxton, Massachusetts, and the hockey team host home games at the New England Sports Center in Marlborough, Massachusetts.

One of the most prominent buildings on the former Leicester campus was the Rev. Samuel May House, built in 1835 and officially recognized in 2008 as a stop on the Underground Railroad. Rev. Samuel May was a leading anti-slavery figure for over three decades and a prominent individual in the New England literary community during the mid-1800s. His wife was a member of the Daughters of the American Revolution (DAR) as well as an outspoken proponent for women's suffrage. Frequent visitors to the May House included Ralph Waldo Emerson, William Lloyd Garrison, Booker T. Washington, George Hoar, May's brother-in-law, Bronson Alcott, and his daughter Louisa May Alcott. It is known that the young author spent summers at the May House and it has been reported that she wrote some of her works from her room on the third floor. The house currently serves as a residence hall.

The college broke ground in the spring 2011 on a new campus center in Leicester. The George F. and Sybil H. Fuller Campus Center was opened in September 2012. The new building was adjacent to the previous student center and houses a dining hall and fitness center as well as academic, office, and social spaces.

Becker has two campus libraries with a combined collection of 73,467 cataloged items as well as periodicals and newspapers

=== Equestrian Center ===
Becker College offered equine academic programs, a competitive equestrian team for Becker College students, boarding, and lessons for the public at the Becker College Equestrian Center, located in Paxton, Massachusetts.

=== Lenfest Animal Health Center ===
A teaching facility which includes a veterinary clinic that can see clients for wellness care and non-urgent medical and surgical care for dogs, cats, other small mammals, and birds, located on the Leicester campus.

=== John J. Dorsey Sr. Crime Scene Lab ===
A teaching facility that gives students the opportunity to assess a crime scene, in terms of understanding the nature of physical evidence, located on the Worcester campus.

== Athletics ==
Becker College once fielded 17 intercollegiate athletic teams that competed in the Division III level of the National Collegiate Athletic Association (NCAA). Prior to becoming an NCAA institution in the fall of 1998, Becker competed in junior college athletics.

The 2007–08 women's basketball team was the first team to qualify for the NCAA tournament. The soccer, tennis, field hockey, golf, basketball, baseball, volleyball and softball teams competed in the New England Collegiate Conference (NECC). The football team was a member of the Commonwealth Coast Conference (CCC). Men's ice hockey was an associate member of the CCC. Women's lacrosse was a member of the New England Women's Lacrosse Alliance (NEWLA). Men's lacrosse was an associate member of the NECC. The equestrian team was a member of the Intercollegiate Horse Show Association (IHSA/ Zone 1, Region 1). The women's ice hockey team, which was introduced in the fall of 2014, was a member of Eastern College Athletic Conference Northeast (ECAC).

Their website has been archived by d3archive.com at beckerhawks.com.d3archive.com

== Notable alumni ==
- Penny Bacchiochi (1981), member of the Connecticut House of Representatives
- Colleen Barrett (1964), former president of Southwest Airlines
- Kacey Bellamy (did not graduate), professional ice hockey player
- James Diossa (2009), mayor of Central Falls, Rhode Island, Rhode Island General Treasurer
- Jimmy Foster (did not graduate), professional basketball player
- James A. Kelly Jr. (1970), member of the Massachusetts Senate
- Tony Koski (did not graduate), professional basketball player
- Timothy Roche, member of the Maine House of Representatives
- John Rucho, member of the Massachusetts House of Representatives
- Harry G. Stoddard, businessman
