= 2020 Maine Democratic presidential primary =

- March 3, 2020

32 delegates (24 pledged, 8 unpledged) to the Democratic National Convention The number of pledged delegates won is determined by the popular vote

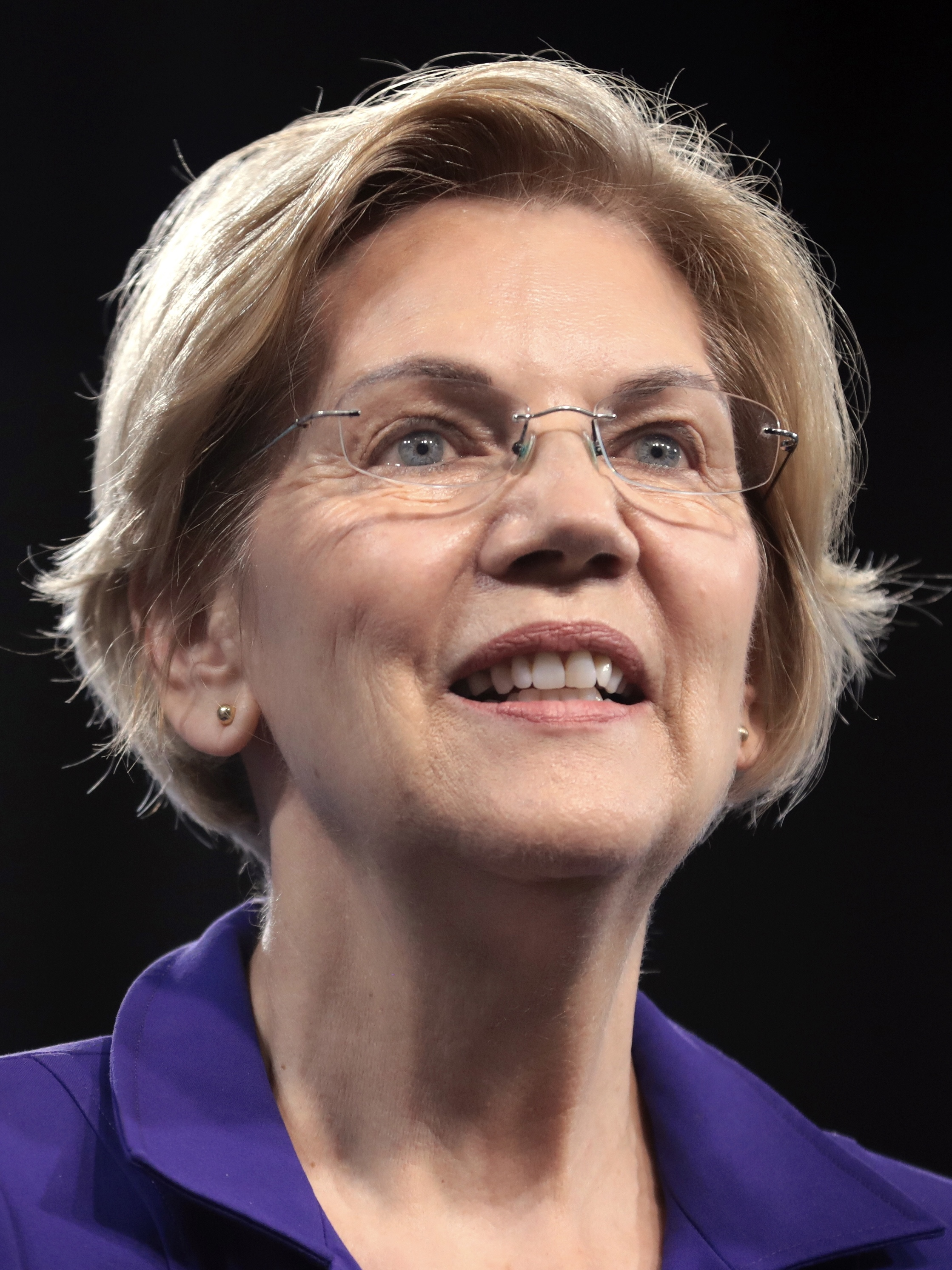

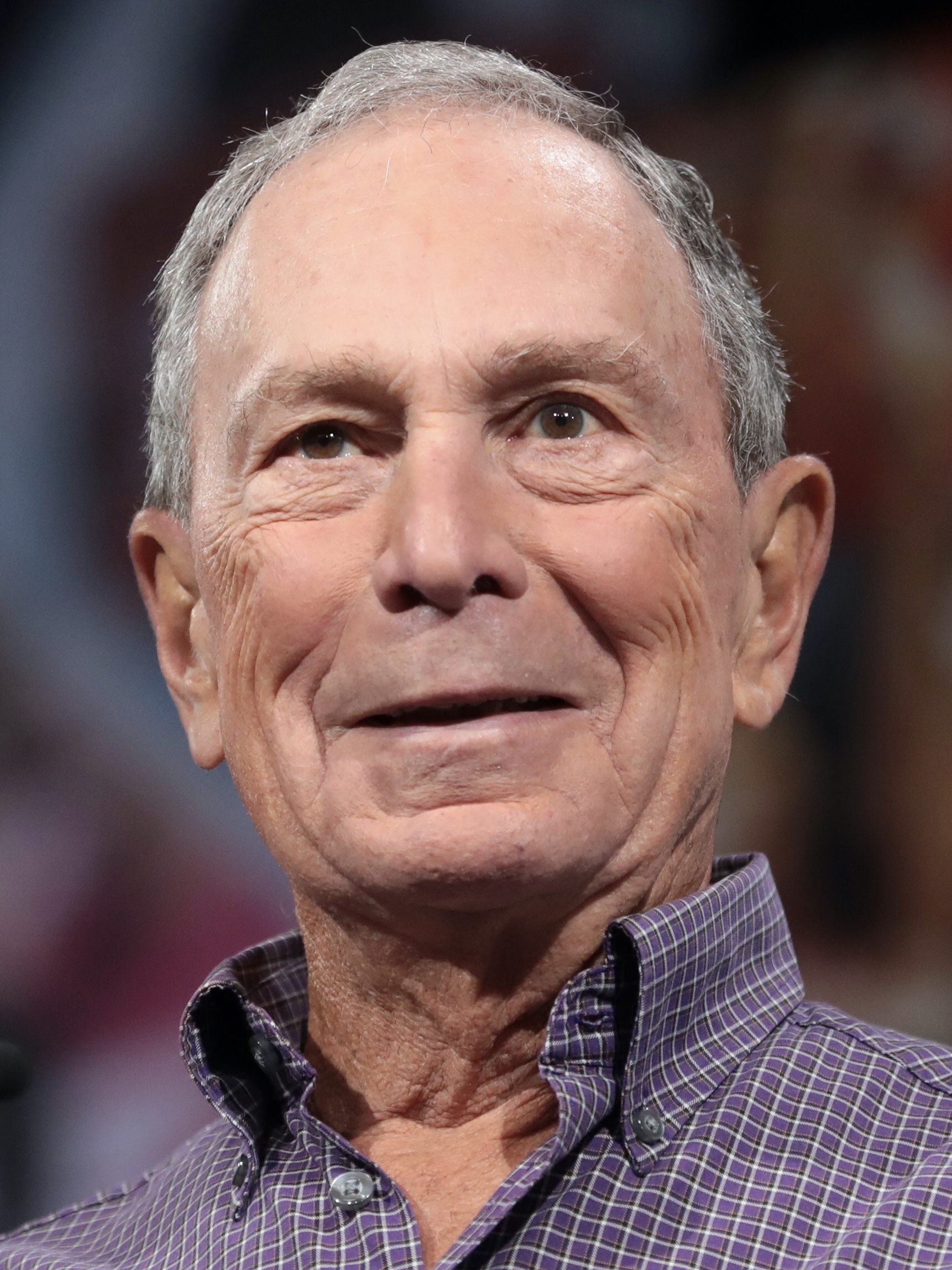
Candidate	Joe Biden	Bernie Sanders
Home state	Delaware	Vermont
Delegate count	11	9
Popular vote	68,729	66,826
Percentage	33.37%	32.45%
Candidate	Elizabeth Warren	Michael Bloomberg
Home state	Massachusetts	New York
Delegate count	4	0
Popular vote	32,055	24,294
Percentage	15.57%	11.80%
County results
Biden
30–40%
40–50%
Sanders
30–40%

The 2020 Maine Democratic presidential primary took place on March 3, 2020, as one of 15 contests scheduled on Super Tuesday in the Democratic Party primaries for the 2020 presidential election, following the South Carolina primary the weekend before. The Maine primary, the first in the state since 2000, was a closed primary, meaning that only registered Democrats could vote in this primary, but unenrolled voters were permitted to enroll in a party at the polls with same day registration. The state awarded 32 delegates towards the 2020 Democratic National Convention, 24 of which were pledged delegates allocated based on the results of the primary. The primary election coincided with a people's veto referendum to reject changes to Maine's vaccination laws.

In a result described as a "stunning upset", the Bangor Daily News and the Associated Press called the primary for former vice president Joe Biden, which heavily contrasted Bernie Sanders' win in the 2016 caucus, when he had won with over 60% of the vote against Hillary Clinton. Biden won the primary with 33.4% of the vote, heavily exceeding his polling numbers by at least 10 points, while senator Sanders finished second with a more or less expected or slightly underperformed result of 32.4%. With a margin of less than 2,000 votes and especially just around 300 votes in the 1st congressional district, Biden managed to narrowly gain one more delegate than Sanders in both districts, resulting in his win with 11 delegates over Sanders' 9 delegates. Senator Elizabeth Warren also managed to cross the threshold with 15.6% in the state around her home region but only received 4 delegates.

== Procedure ==
Maine was one of 14 states and one territory holding primaries on March 3, 2020, also known as "Super Tuesday", as governor Janet Mills had signed a bill which returned the state's nominating contest from a caucus to a primary (last used between 1996 and 2000), matching a national trend for primaries. Although a bill expanding the use of ranked choice voting to presidential primary and general elections was passed by the legislature, governor Mills delayed implementation until after the 2020 primary.

Voting was expected to take place throughout the state from 6:00 a.m. until 8:00 p.m. in much of the state, with some precincts opening as late as 10:00 a.m. In the closed primary, candidates had to meet a threshold of 15 percent at the congressional district or statewide level in order to be considered viable. The 24 pledged delegates to the 2020 Democratic National Convention were allocated proportionally on the basis of the results of the primary. Of these, 7 and 9 were allocated to each of the state's 2 congressional districts and another 3 were allocated to party leaders and elected officials (PLEO delegates), in addition to 5 at-large delegates. The Super Tuesday primary as part of Stage I on the primary timetable received no bonus delegates, in order to disperse the primaries between more different date clusters and keep too many states from hoarding on the first shared date or on a March date in general.

Following municipal caucuses on March 8, 2020, to select delegates for the state convention, the state convention would subsequently be held on May 30, 2020, to vote on all pledged delegates for the Democratic National Convention. The delegation also included 8 unpledged PLEO delegates: 4 members of the Democratic National Committee, 2 members of Congress, of which both were representatives, the governor Janet Mills, and former Senate Majority Leader George J. Mitchell.

Pledged national convention delegates
Type	Del.
CD1	9
CD2	7
PLEO	3
At-large	5
Total pledged delegates	24

== Candidates ==
The following candidates were on the ballot in Maine:

Running

- Joe Biden
- Michael Bloomberg
- Tulsi Gabbard
- Bernie Sanders
- Elizabeth Warren

Withdrawn

- Cory Booker
- Pete Buttigieg (Note: Candidate withdrew during absentee voting, shortly before the date of the election.)
- Amy Klobuchar
- Deval Patrick (Note: Candidate withdrew following the New Hampshire primary, when absentee voting had already begun.)
- Tom Steyer
- Marianne Williamson
- Andrew Yang

Write-in votes are not allowed in Maine and were counted as blank ballots.

== Polling ==
Polling Aggregation
Source of poll aggregation	Date updated	Dates polled	Bernie Sanders	Joe Biden	Michael Bloomberg	Elizabeth Warren	Tulsi Gabbard	Undecided (Note: Calculated by taking the difference of 100% and all other candidates combined)
270 to Win	Mar 3, 2020	Feb 10–Mar 2, 2020	28.7%	19.7%	20.0%	13.3%	1.3%	17.0%
RealClear Politics	Mar 3, 2020	Feb 28–Mar 2, 2020	38.5%	24.5%	14.0%	18.0%	– (Note: Gabbard not averaged)	5.0%
FiveThirtyEight	Mar 3, 2020	until Mar 2, 2020 (Note: FiveThirtyEight aggregates polls with a trendline regression of polls rather than a strict average of recent polls.)	31.1%	21.7%	17.2%	14.2%	0.7%	19.6%
Average			32.8%	22.0%	17.1%	15.2%	1.0%	11.9%
Maine primary results (March 3, 2020)			32.4%	33.4%	11.8%	15.6%	0.9%	5.9%

Tabulation of individual polls of the 2020 Maine Democratic Primary
Poll source	Date(s) administered	Sample size	Margin of error	Joe Biden	Michael Bloomberg	Pete Buttigieg	Kamala Harris	Bernie Sanders	Elizabeth Warren	Andrew Yang	Other	Undecided
	Mar 2, 2020	Klobuchar withdraws from the race										
Swayable	Mar 1–2, 2020	209 (LV)	± 9.0%	22%	28%	10%	–	27%	11%	–	3% (Note: Klobuchar with 2%; Steyer with 0%; Gabbard with no voters; "Other" with 1%)	–
Change Research	Mar 1–2, 2020	507 (LV)	–	24%	10%	–	–	43%	16%	–	7% (Note: Not yet released)	–
Data for Progress	Feb 28–Mar 2, 2020	385 (LV)	± 4.9%	25%	18%	1%	–	34%	20%	–	2% (Note: Klobuchar and Gabbard with 1%)	–
	Mar 1, 2020	Buttigieg withdraws from the race										
SocialSphere/Colby College	Feb 10–13, 2020	350 (LV)	–	12%	14%	16%	–	25%	9%	2%	10% (Note: Klobuchar with 4%; Gabbard with 3%; Steyer with 2%; Bennet with 1%; Patrick and "Someone else" with no voters)	12%
	Feb 11, 2020	Yang withdraws from the race										
	Dec 3, 2019	Harris withdraws from the race										
Maine People's Resource Center	Oct 14–21, 2019	728 (LV)	± 3.63%	26.8%	–	9.1%	5.0%	15.4%	22.1%	1.7%	11.4% (Note: "Other" with 6.5%; Booker with 2.7% and O'Rourke with 2.2%)	4.4%
Public Policy Polling	Oct 11–13, 2019	366 (LV)	± 5.1%	19%	–	9%	4%	12%	31%	3%	20% (Note: Booker with 2%; Castro and O'Rourke with 1%; "someone else/undecided" with 16%)	– (Note: The poll did not announce this result separately; it is listed as part of 'Other'.)
Gravis Marketing	Jun 24, 2019	243	± 6.3%	25%	–	8%	2%	15%	17%	5%	15% (Note: Ryan with 4%; Booker and Williamson with 3%; Bennet with 2%; Gillibrand, O'Rourke, and Swalwell with 1%; Bullock, Castro, de Blasio, Gabbard, Hickenlooper Inslee, and Klobuchar with 0%)	11%

== Results ==
2020 Maine Democratic presidential primary
Candidate	Votes	%	Delegates
Joe Biden	68,729	33.37	11
Bernie Sanders	66,826	32.45	9
Elizabeth Warren	32,055	15.57	4
Michael Bloomberg	24,294	11.80	
Pete Buttigieg (withdrawn)	4,364	2.12	
Amy Klobuchar (withdrawn)	2,826	1.37	
Tulsi Gabbard	1,815	0.88	
Andrew Yang (withdrawn)	696	0.34	
Tom Steyer (withdrawn)	313	0.15	
Deval Patrick (withdrawn)	218	0.11	
Marianne Williamson (withdrawn)	201	0.10	
Cory Booker (withdrawn)	183	0.09	
Blank ballots	3,417	1.66	
Total	205,937	100%	24

=== Results by county ===
2020 Maine Democratic primary (results per county)
County	Joe Biden		Bernie Sanders		Elizabeth Warren		Michael Bloomberg		Pete Buttigieg		Amy Klobuchar		Tulsi Gabbard		Andrew Yang		Tom Steyer		Deval Patrick		Marianne Williamson		Cory Booker		Blank ballots		Total votes cast
County	Votes	%	Votes	%	Votes	%	Votes	%	Votes	%	Votes	%	Votes	%	Votes	%	Votes	%	Votes	%	Votes	%	Votes	%	Votes	%	Total votes cast
Androscoggin	4,076	34.20	3,639	30.54	1,431	12.01	1,762	14.79	246	2.06	139	1.17	160	1.34	47	0.39	22	0.18	35	0.29	20	0.17	14	0.12	326	2.74	11,917
Aroostook	2,558	46.15	1,256	22.66	361	6.51	851	15.35	88	1.59	50	0.90	34	0.61	28	0.51	14	0.25	11	0.20	11	0.20	16	0.29	265	4.78	5,543
Cumberland	20,555	31.18	22,187	33.66	12,701	19.27	6,766	10.26	1,521	2.31	957	1.45	413	0.63	149	0.23	63	0.10	37	0.06	32	0.05	43	0.07	500	0.76	65,924
Franklin	1,226	33.93	1,329	36.78	414	11.46	390	10.79	49	1.36	40	1.11	40	1.11	18	0.50	11	0.30	16	0.44	7	0.19	5	0.14	68	1.88	3,613
Hancock	2,988	31.28	3,328	34.84	1,756	18.39	1,005	10.52	171	1.79	125	1.31	32	0.34	31	0.32	19	0.20	2	0.02	10	0.10	8	0.08	76	0.80	9,551
Kennebec	5,651	35.59	4,775	30.07	2,222	13.99	2,062	12.99	314	1.98	208	1.31	185	1.17	65	0.41	29	0.18	17	0.11	20	0.13	13	0.08	318	2.00	15,879
Knox	2,586	32.44	2,611	32.75	1,486	18.64	892	11.19	106	1.33	102	1.28	65	0.82	22	0.28	1	0.01	9	0.11	4	0.05	5	0.06	83	1.04	7,972
Lincoln	2,138	34.21	2,020	32.33	979	15.67	753	12.05	117	1.87	86	1.38	47	0.75	17	0.27	5	0.08	21	0.34	2	0.03	4	0.06	60	0.96	6,249
Oxford	2,282	35.52	2,199	34.23	739	11.50	736	11.46	99	1.54	66	1.03	93	1.45	30	0.47	8	0.12	3	0.05	10	0.16	6	0.09	154	2.40	6,425
Penobscot	5,392	33.24	5,526	34.07	2,138	13.18	2,045	12.61	265	1.63	216	1.33	125	0.77	89	0.55	27	0.17	23	0.14	22	0.14	20	0.12	332	2.05	16,220
Piscataquis	520	36.31	425	29.68	147	10.27	234	16.34	22	1.54	17	1.19	8	0.56	7	0.49	2	0.14	2	0.14	4	0.28	3	0.21	41	2.86	1,432
Sagadahoc	2,274	32.15	2,054	29.04	1,245	17.60	830	11.74	128	1.81	94	1.33	69	0.98	14	0.20	10	0.14	3	0.04	3	0.04	1	0.01	347	4.91	7,072
Somerset	1,553	36.46	1,225	28.76	360	8.45	699	16.41	86	2.02	45	1.06	53	1.24	38	0.89	12	0.28	5	0.12	12	0.28	6	0.14	166	3.90	4,260
Waldo	1,902	29.64	2,469	38.48	1,038	16.18	664	10.35	101	1.57	69	1.08	44	0.69	18	0.28	8	0.12	4	0.06	9	0.14	7	0.11	83	1.29	6,416
Washington	1,131	36.41	892	28.72	389	12.52	410	13.20	61	1.96	48	1.55	30	0.97	10	0.32	4	0.13	5	0.16	4	0.13	8	0.26	114	3.67	3,106
York	11,781	35.42	10,454	31.43	4,286	12.88	4,154	12.49	904	2.72	523	1.57	414	1.24	109	0.33	77	0.23	25	0.08	31	0.09	24	0.07	483	1.45	33,265
UOCAVA	116	10.61	437	39.98	363	33.21	41	3.75	86	7.87	41	3.75	3	0.27	4	0.37	1	0.09	0	0	0	0	0	0	1	0.09	1,093
Total	68,729	33.37	66,826	32.45	32,055	15.57	24,294	11.80	4,364	2.12	2,826	1.37	1,815	0.88	696	0.34	313	0.15	218	0.11	201	0.10	183	0.09	3,417	1.66	205,937

== See also ==
- 2020 Maine Republican presidential primary
- Spoiler effect
- Split vote

== Notes ==
Additional candidates
