= Daniel Hobbs =

American politician

Member of the Maine House of Representatives from the 145th district
- Incumbent
- Assumed office December 7, 2022
- Preceded by: Chris Johansen

Member of the Maine House of Representatives from the 7th district
- In office December 2018 – December 2020
- Succeeded by: Timothy Roche

Personal details
- Born: Maine, U.S.
- Party: Democratic
- Education: Nasson College (BA)
- Profession: Flight attendant

Daniel J. Hobbs is an American politician who has served as a member of the Maine House of Representatives. He currently represents Maine's 145th House district.

== Electoral history ==
Hobbs was first elected to the 7th district in the 2018 Maine House of Representatives election. He lost to Timothy Roche in the 2020 Maine House of Representatives election. He was redistricted to the 145th district and elected to a seat there in the 2022 Maine House of Representatives election.

== Biography ==
Hobbs graduated from Deering High School. He earned a Bachelor of Arts from Nasson College in 1972. He has worked as a flight attendant for Delta and Northeast Airlines. After retiring from that profession, he started working as a school bus driver.
