= Washburn Square–Leicester Common Historic District =

Historic district in Massachusetts, United States

- U.S. National Register of Historic Places
- U.S. Historic district
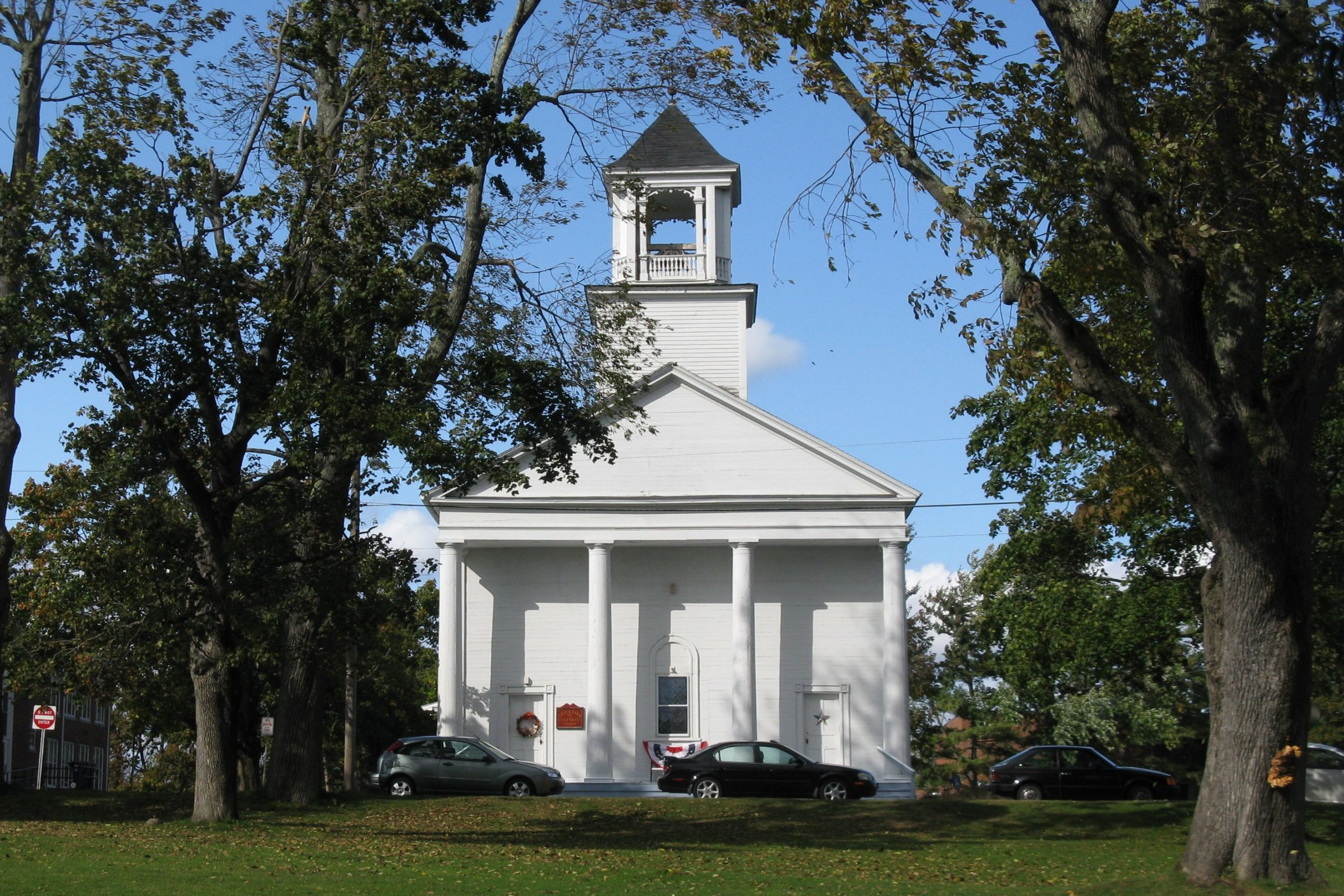
- Leicester Unitarian Church

- Location within Massachusetts Location within the United States
- Location: Leicester, Massachusetts
- Coordinates: 42°14′46″N 71°54′13″W
- Area: 21 acres (8.5 ha)
- Built: 1931
- Architect: Earle & Fisher; et al.
- Architectural style: Georgian, Federal
- NRHP reference No.: 06000062
- Added to NRHP: February 22, 2006

The Washburn Square–Leicester Common Historic District encompasses the historic civic heart of Leicester, Massachusetts. It includes Washburn Square, as the town common is called; the buildings along its perimeter; and the properties along Main Street extending east along Main Street to its junction with Henshaw Street. It includes the 1939 Leicester Town Hall, Becker College's 1962 Swan Library, a Victorian Gothic Revival First Congregational Church (a rarity due to its comparatively late construction date, 1901) and the 1834 Leicester Unitarian Church (originally known as the Second Congregational Church). The south side of Washburn Square (named for Leicester native son Governor Emory Washburn) is lined with stately homes that now are almost all owned by Becker College.

The district was listed on the National Register of Historic Places in 2006.

== See also ==
- National Register of Historic Places listings in Worcester County, Massachusetts
