= Bettyann Sheats =

American politician

Bettyann Watson Sheats is an American politician from Maine. A Democrat, she served in the Maine House of Representatives. She lost her seat in a re-election campaign and also lost in her campaign for a Maine Senate seat.

Sheats attended the United States Military Academy and served in the U.S. Army from 1979 to 1991. She served in the Maine House of Representatives from 2016 to 2020. She was succeeded by Republican Laurel Libby. He husband George Sheats is an Episcopal priest. In 2021, she became part of the board of directors of the Finance Authority of Maine.

Maine House of Representatives
Preceded by David Sawicki	Member of the Maine House of Representatives from the 64th district 2016–2020	Succeeded by Laurel Libby
