= 2020 Maine Republican presidential primary =

- March 3, 2020

22 Republican National Convention delegates

Candidate	Donald Trump	Blank votes
Home state	Florida	N/A
Delegate count	22	—
Popular vote	95,360	18,368
Percentage	83.8%	16.2%
- Trump: 75–80% 80–85% 85–90%

The 2020 Maine Republican presidential primary took place on March 3, 2020, as one of 14 contests scheduled for Super Tuesday in the Republican Party primaries for the 2020 presidential election. The primary was a closed primary (only open to party members) although unenrolled voters were permitted to enroll in a party at the polls with same day registration.

The primary was held along with a people's veto referendum to reject changes to Maine's vaccination laws.

== Results ==
Incumbent President Donald Trump was the only candidate to qualify for the ballot. His 84% share of the vote was his lowest performance of any state in the primaries. Several town clerks speculated that the high number of blank votes cast was due to Republican voters being more interested in voting in the anti-vaccination people's veto referendum than in the primary.

2020 Maine Republican primary
Candidate	Votes	%	Delegates
Donald Trump	95,360	83.85	22
Blank votes	18,368	16.15	0
Total	113,728	100%	22

=== Results by county ===
2020 Maine Republican primary (results per county)
County	Donald Trump		Blank votes		Total votes cast
County	Votes	%	Votes	%	Total votes cast
Androscoggin	7,221	87.14	1,066	12.86	8,287
Aroostook	4,560	88.25	607	11.75	5,167
Cumberland	15,943	77.39	4,658	22.61	20,601
Franklin	2,592	81.77	578	18.23	3,170
Hancock	4,334	83.19	876	16.81	5,210
Kennebec	9,473	84.08	1,793	15.92	11,266
Knox	3,037	81.66	682	18.34	3,719
Lincoln	3,193	82.23	690	17.77	3,883
Oxford	4,299	84.23	805	15.77	5,104
Penobscot	11,901	87.78	1,656	12.22	13,557
Piscataquis	1,699	88.12	229	11.88	1,928
Sagadahoc	2,942	83.70	573	16.30	3,515
Somerset	4,403	88.47	574	11.53	4,977
Waldo	3,429	85.28	592	14.72	4,021
Washington	2,828	87.96	387	12.04	3,215
York	13,435	83.93	2,572	16.07	16,007
UOCAVA	71	70.30	30	29.70	101
Total	95,360	83.85	18,368	16.15	113,728

== See also ==
- 2020 Maine Democratic presidential primary
