= Winthrop Chandler =

American painter

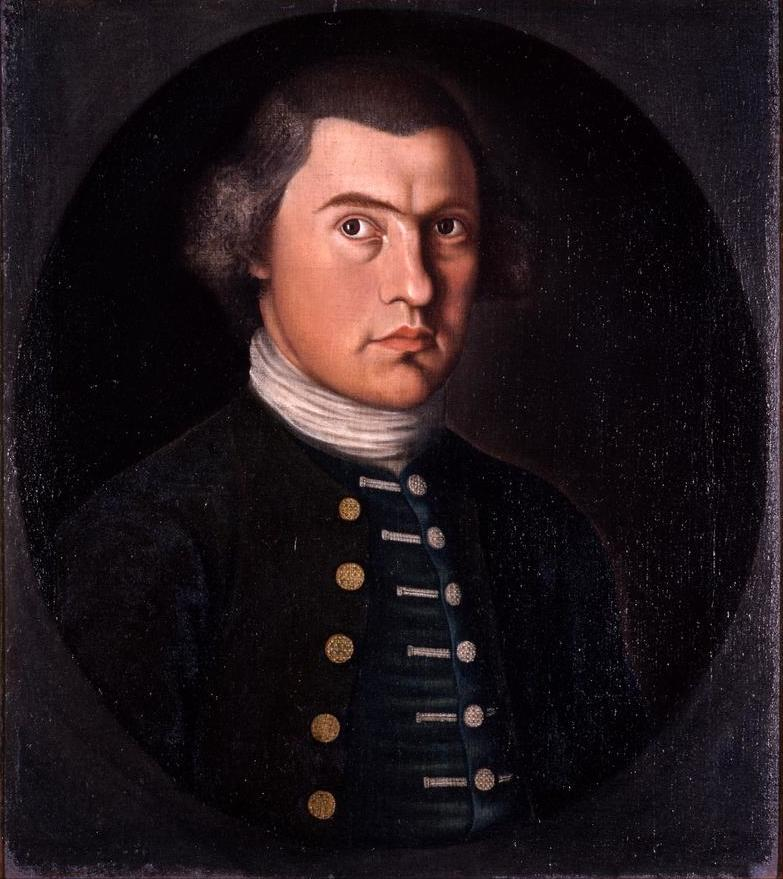
- Born: April 6, 1747
- Died: July 29, 1790 (aged 43)
- Occupation: Painter
- Known for: portraits

Winthrop Chandler (April 6, 1747 – July 29, 1790) was an American artist known for his portraits, mainly of family members and neighbors, and a few landscapes. He also worked as an ornamental artist.

== Life ==
Chandler was born on the family farm, Chandler Hill, located on the boundary between Thompson and Woodstock, Connecticut. He was the son of William Chandler, a farmer, and Jemima Bradbury Chandler of Woodstock. After his father's death in 1754, Chandler pursued a career as a portrait and ornamental painter. A source claims that the artist studied the art of portrait painting in Boston, although there is only circumstantial evidence of this claim and no documentary proof.

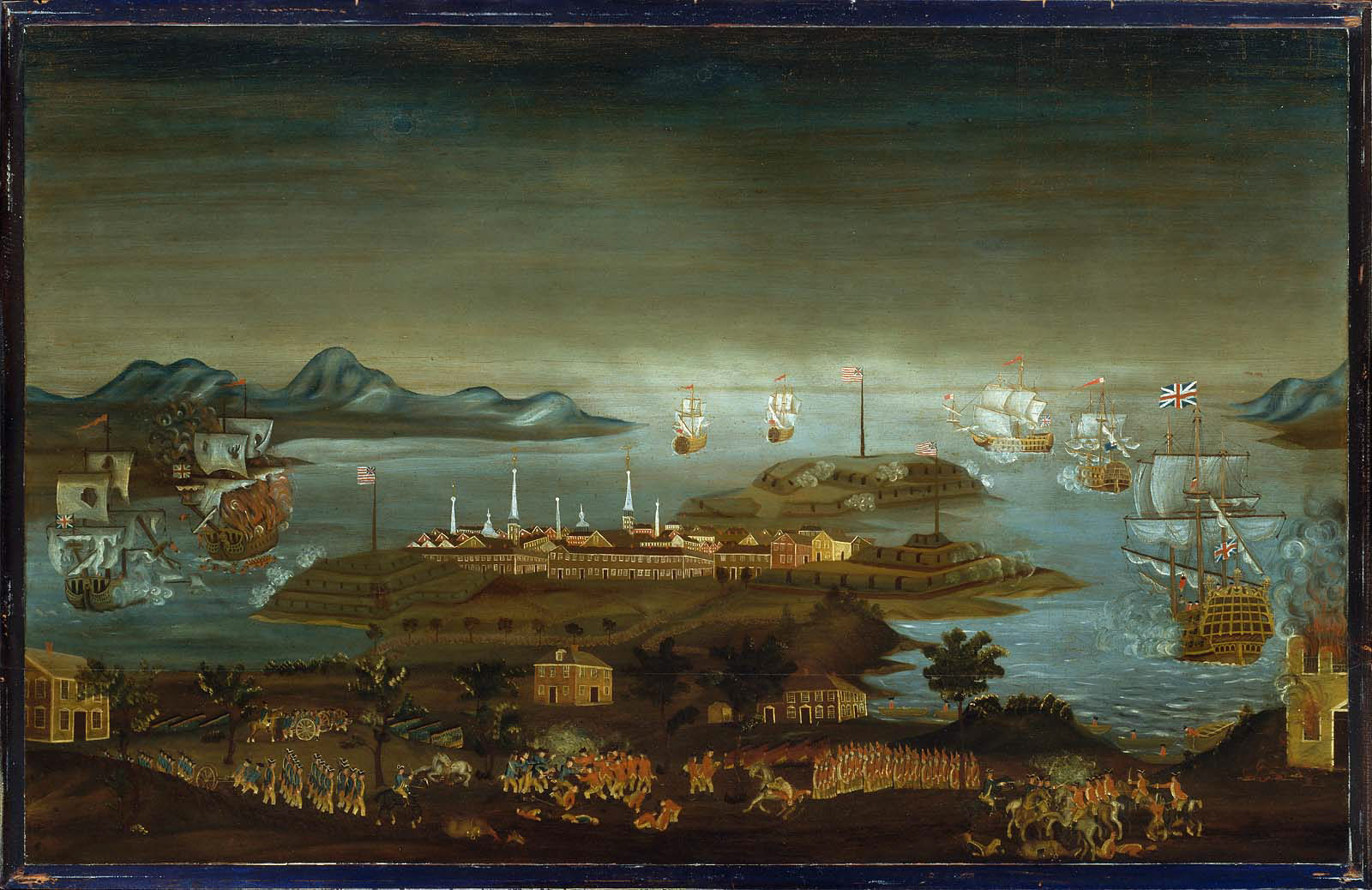
The Battle of Bunker Hill, Boston, 1776–1777

In 1772, Chandler married Mary Gleason. He does not appear to have participated in the Revolutionary War. Members of his family did as is demonstrated by the portrait of his brother Samuel in captain's uniform. Over time he pursued a variety of visual arts, including gilding, carving and illustrating, as well as portraiture, landscape and house painting. This variety of skills points to a possible training as an artisan-painter. Despite a modest family inheritance, Chandler soon began to experience financial difficulties that would continue throughout his life.

In 1785 Chandler moved to Worcester, Massachusetts, where he remained for five years. He likely made this move to look for new patrons as he was constantly experiencing financial difficulties. Here he also worked as a house painter. During this period his son Charles as well as his wife died, and his remaining children were sent to live with relatives, possibly his sister, since he painted Mrs. Crafts, née Mahitible Chandler in 1781. His sister had moved with her husband Ebenezer Crafts to Craftsbury, Vermont.

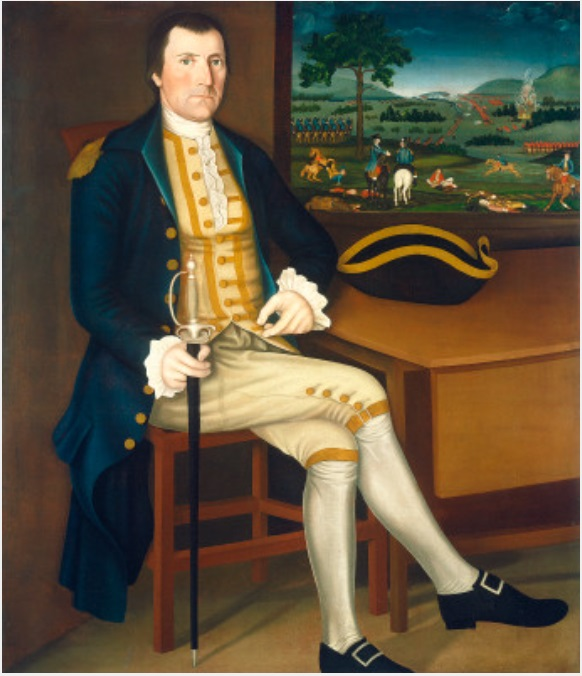
Portrait of Captain Samuel Chandler

Chandler returned to Chandler Hill where he died on July 29, 1790. Chandler was so destitute that his estate was left to the selectmen of Thompson to pay for his medical and funeral expenses.

== Work ==
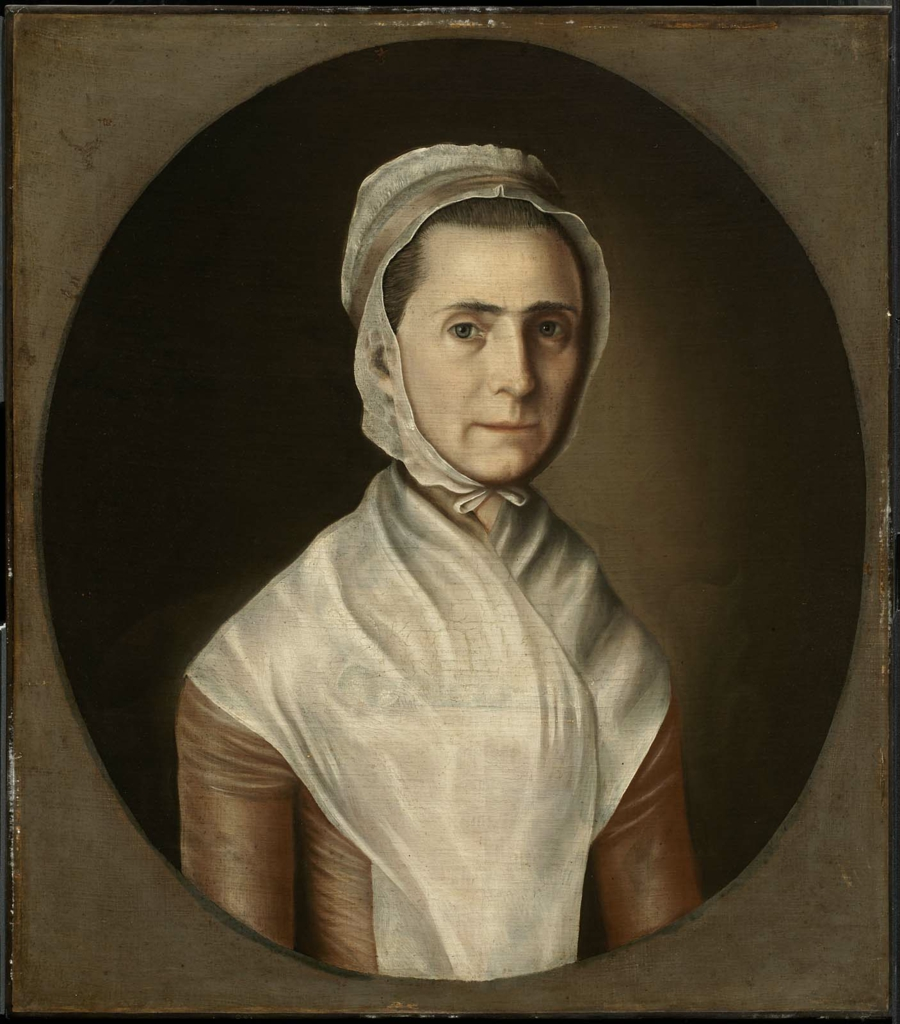
Portrait of Levi Willard

Chandler was mainly a portrait painter. "In contrast to the many itinerant artists of the time, Chandler did not travel in search of commissions, and most of his sitters were family members or neighbors" of whom he made about 50 portraits. His first known portraits date from 1770.

A set of ornamental landscapes is also attributed to Chandler. These are often based on English prints and local elements such as the New England landscape and buildings.

Chandler's style is characterized by a flat, linear manner of painting and a realistic representation of his sitters. He can best be regarded as a very gifted folk painter.
