= Timothy Roche =

American politician

Tim Roche

Member of the Maine House of Representatives from the 3rd district
- In office December 2, 2020 – December 7, 2022
- Preceded by: Daniel Hobbs
- Succeeded by: Mark Babin

Personal details
- Born: Timothy A. Roche
- Party: Republican
- Spouse: Cindy
- Children: 1
- Education: Becker College
- Website: legislature.maine.gov/house/house/MemberProfiles/Details/1407

Timothy Roche is an American educator, football coach, and politician. He is currently a member of the Maine House of Representatives, representing District 7.

Roche lives in Wells, Maine. He was first elected to the Maine House of Representatives in 2020, defeating Democratic incumbent Daniel Hobbs. He sits on the Educational and Cultural Affairs Committee.

Prior to serving in the Maine House of Representatives, he served as a selectmen in Wells.

Roche has served as the football coach for Wells High School for over two decades. He has led the team to four state championships during his tenure as coach. MaxPreps named him the best high school football coach in state.
