= New England Women's Lacrosse Alliance =

The New England Women's Lacrosse Alliance (NEWLA) was an NCAA Division III women's lacrosse-only conference that disbanded in 2012. NEWLA had nine member schools representing three states: (Maine, Massachusetts, and Vermont). The schools joined their primary sports conference, seven schools joined the Massachusetts State Collegiate Athletic Conference and two the New England Collegiate Conference.

== Member schools ==
2012 season membership:

- Becker College
- Bridgewater State College
- Elms College
- Fitchburg State College
- Framingham State University
- Massachusetts Maritime
- Salem State
- Westfield State College
- Worcester State College

== History ==
The NEWLA was founded in 1998. The original members consisted of two playing divisions: a North division consisting of Castleton State College, Colby-Sawyer College, Keene State College, New England College, University of New England, and Plymouth State College, and a South division consisting of Bridgewater State, Elms College, Endicott College, Eastern Connecticut State University, and UMass Dartmouth.

== Past Champions ==
- 2004 - Western New England College
- 2005 - Western New England College
- 2006 - Western New England College
- 2007 - Western New England College
- 2008 - Bridgewater State
- 2009 - Bridgewater State
- 2010 - Bridgewater State
- 2011 - Bridgewater State
- 2012 - Bridgewater State

== Former members ==
- Colby Sawyer 1998-2002
- Eastern Connecticut State 1998-2002
- Emerson College 2004-2007
- Endicott 1998-2002
- Keene State 1998-2002
- Lasell College 1999-2007
- UMass Dartmouth 1998-2002
- New England College 1998-2002
- Norwich University 2007-2008
- University of New England 1998-2002
- Plymouth State 1998-2002
- Salem State College 2002-2004
- Salve Regina University 1999-2002
- University of Southern Maine 1999-2002
- Western New England College 1999-2007
