= Ricky Long =

American politician

Ricky D. Long

Member of the Maine House of Representatives for the 9th District
- In office December 2010 – December 2014

Member of the Maine House of Representatives for the 143rd District
- In office December 2014 – December 2016
- Succeeded by: Chris A. Johansen

Personal details
- Party: Republican
- Education: Katahdin High School
- Profession: Fire Chief

Ricky D. Long is an American politician from Maine. A Republican, Long formerly represented a portion of Aroostook County, Maine, in the Maine House of Representatives. He was first elected to the legislature in 2010 after serving as chair of the board of selectmen in his hometown of Sherman, Maine. During the 126th Legislature (2013–14), Long submitted a bill to ban the Agenda 21 environmental action plan in Maine. He also co-sponsored a bill with Senator Roger Sherman (R-Houlton) to allow the town of Bancroft, Maine, to become an unorganized territory.
