= Split vote =

Parliamentary procedure with no majority

A split vote is normally used synonymously with, "deadlocked", "hung", or "evenly split" vote. It indicates a vote in which no decision can be made, as neither side has the majority.

The term can be used to indicate dissent by as little as a single vote, if a unanimous vote is required.

If a casting vote is available, this may be used to break the deadlock. In other cases it may result in situations such as hung juries or hung parliaments.

A split vote may arise from vote splitting, which occurs in an election when the existence of two or more similar candidates reduces the votes received by each of them, reducing the chances of any one of them winning against another, significantly different, candidate.

In systems that require a winning candidate to receive a majority of votes, this may result in a runoff election.

== See also ==
- List of democracy and elections-related topics
