= 2020 Maine Question 1 =

Referendum on religious and philosophical vaccination exemptions

Question 1
- March 3, 2020
- Do you want to reject the new law that removes religious and philosophical exemptions to requiring immunization against certain communicable diseases for students to attend schools and colleges and for employees of nursery schools and health care facilities?

Results
Choice	Votes	%
Yes	105,214	27.09%
No	281,750	72.54%
Blank votes	1,429	0.37%
Against
80–90%
70–80%
60–70%
50–60%
Results by county

2020 Maine Question 1 was a people's veto referendum that sought to reject a new law which eliminated religious and philosophical exemptions from school vaccination requirements and for employees of nursery schools and health care facilities. The question appeared on the statewide ballot on March 3, 2020, coinciding with the Democratic and Republican presidential primaries for the 2020 U.S. presidential election.

The veto effort was defeated 73%–27%.

== LD 798 ==
On April 23, 2019, The Maine House of Representatives voted 78–59 to pass LD 798, "An Act To Protect Maine Children and Students from Preventable Diseases by Repealing Certain Exemptions from the Laws Governing Immunization Requirements". The bill was sponsored by Ryan Tipping (D-Orono).

The Maine State Senate passed the bill 20–15 on May 2, but amended it to keep religious exemptions. The House rejected the amendment on May 7 and sent the bill back to the Senate.

On May 23, the Senate reversed course and passed the bill, without the religious exemption, by a vote of 19–16. On May 24, 2019, Maine governor Janet Mills signed the bill into law effective September 2021. Maine thus became the fourth U.S. state to allow only medical exemptions for school immunization requirements.

== Petition effort ==
Prior to the deadline of September 19, 2019, opponents of the new law submitted 95,071 signatures to Maine Secretary of State Matthew Dunlap. Of those, 79,000 were deemed valid, surpassing the 63,067 required for the veto effort to be included on a statewide ballot. (In Maine, a number of valid signatures equalling 10% of the votes cast in the previous gubernatorial election are required for a people's veto to be accepted for inclusion on a statewide ballot.)

=== Date of the vote ===
While signatures were being gathered, Dunlap's office told organizers of the veto effort that, if qualified for the ballot, the vote would coincide with state legislative and congressional primary elections in June 2020. However, that guidance failed to take into account the recent change in the law to hold primary elections for presidential nominees, as opposed to a caucus, on the March 3 Super Tuesday. Thus the referendum vote would be held on March 3, as it was the next scheduled statewide election. Dunlap's office admitted to the error, but said that it has no discretion over when to schedule elections and explained that timing is generally not discussed until petitions are submitted and validated, which had not happened yet.

== Yes vs. No ==
=== "Yes on 1 to Reject Big Pharma" ===
Supporters of the veto campaign, who wished to restore religious and philosophical exemptions for required vaccination, became "Yes on 1 to Reject Big Pharma."

"Maine has the opportunity to undo this assault on our freedom. Send a message to the pharmaceutical industry and government officials that we will not surrender this basic human right. Help preserve medical freedom in Maine. Vote yes on Question 1." Donna Dodge, resident of Denmark, Maine

=== "No on 1 to Protect Maine's Children" ===
Opponents of the veto, who wished to allow only medical exemptions for required vaccination, became "No on 1 to Protect Maine's Children."

"Right now, Maine’s community immunity rates are not high enough to ensure that children who cannot be immunized attend safe schools. On behalf of all children, our communities and the legacy of prioritizing health and education in Maine, on March 3 please vote “No” on Question 1." Anne Coates, pediatric pulmonologist, Maine Medical Center Pediatric Specialty Care

== Campaign ==
On February 4, 2020, campaigns on both sides of the referendum held campaign kickoff events at the Maine State House.

Yes on 1 was endorsed by state senators Matthew Pouliot (R-Kennebec) and Lisa Keim (R-Oxford); state representatives Robert Foley (R-Wells), Justin Fecteau (R-Augusta) and Heidi H. Sampson (R-Alfred); as well as former physician Christiane Northrup.

No on 1 was endorsed by the Maine Medical Association, the Maine Dental Association, the Maine Hospital Association, the Maine Osteopathic Association, the Barbara Bush Children's Hospital, the Maine Association of School Nurses, the American Academy of Pediatrics, EqualityMaine, Governor Janet Mills, the Bangor Daily News, the Portland Press Herald, and The Ellsworth American.

Supporters of the veto raised over $640,000 while the opposition raised close to $875,000.

Top contributions to the 2020 Maine Question 1 campaign
"Yes" contributor (to overturn the new law)	Amount	"No" contributor (to keep the new law)	Amount
Organic Consumers Association	$50,000	Merck Sharp and Dohme	$250,000
Stephanie Grondin, office manager at Capital City Chiropractic	$25,000	Pfizer	$250,000
Adaptive Digital Media	$19,500	Biotechnology Innovation Organization	$98,000
Aaron Hoshide, University of Maine professor	$13,500	Maine Hospital Association	$50,000
Contributions of $50 or less	$57,957	Contributions of $50 or less	$11,487

== Results ==
The veto effort was defeated 73% (281,750) to 27% (105,214). A total of 386,964 votes were cast.

Breakdown of voting by county
County	Yes %	Votes	No %	Votes
Androscoggin	30.64%	7,866	69.28%	17,787
Aroostook	37.04%	4,879	62.96%	8,295
Cumberland	17.40%	17,846	82.60%	84,718
Franklin	34.90%	3,000	67.10%	5,597
Hancock	33.25%	5,830	66.75%	11,702
Kennebec	29.49%	9,849	70.51%	23,550
Knox	25.94%	3,644	74.06%	10,405
Lincoln	24.87%	3,071	75.13%	9,276
Oxford	32.12%	4,798	67.88%	10,141
Penobscot	35.02%	12,647	64.98%	23,464
Piscataquis	47.16%	1,951	52.84%	2,186
Sagadahoc	22.96%	2,931	77.04%	9,833
Somerset	42.59%	4,836	57.41%	6,518
Waldo	37.26%	4,730	62.74%	7,965
Washington	42.16%	3,319	57.84%	4,554
York	23.69%	13,848	76.31%	44,595
Total (inc. UOCAVA)	27.19%	105,214	72.81%	281,750
