= Ebenezer Crafts =

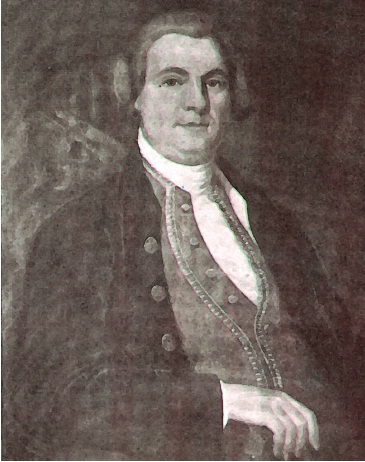
- Born: 22 September 1740; Pomfret, Connecticut
- Died: 24 May 1810 (aged 69); Craftsbury, Vermont

Ebenezer Crafts (1740 – 1810) was one of the founders of Craftsbury, Vermont, and Leicester Academy.

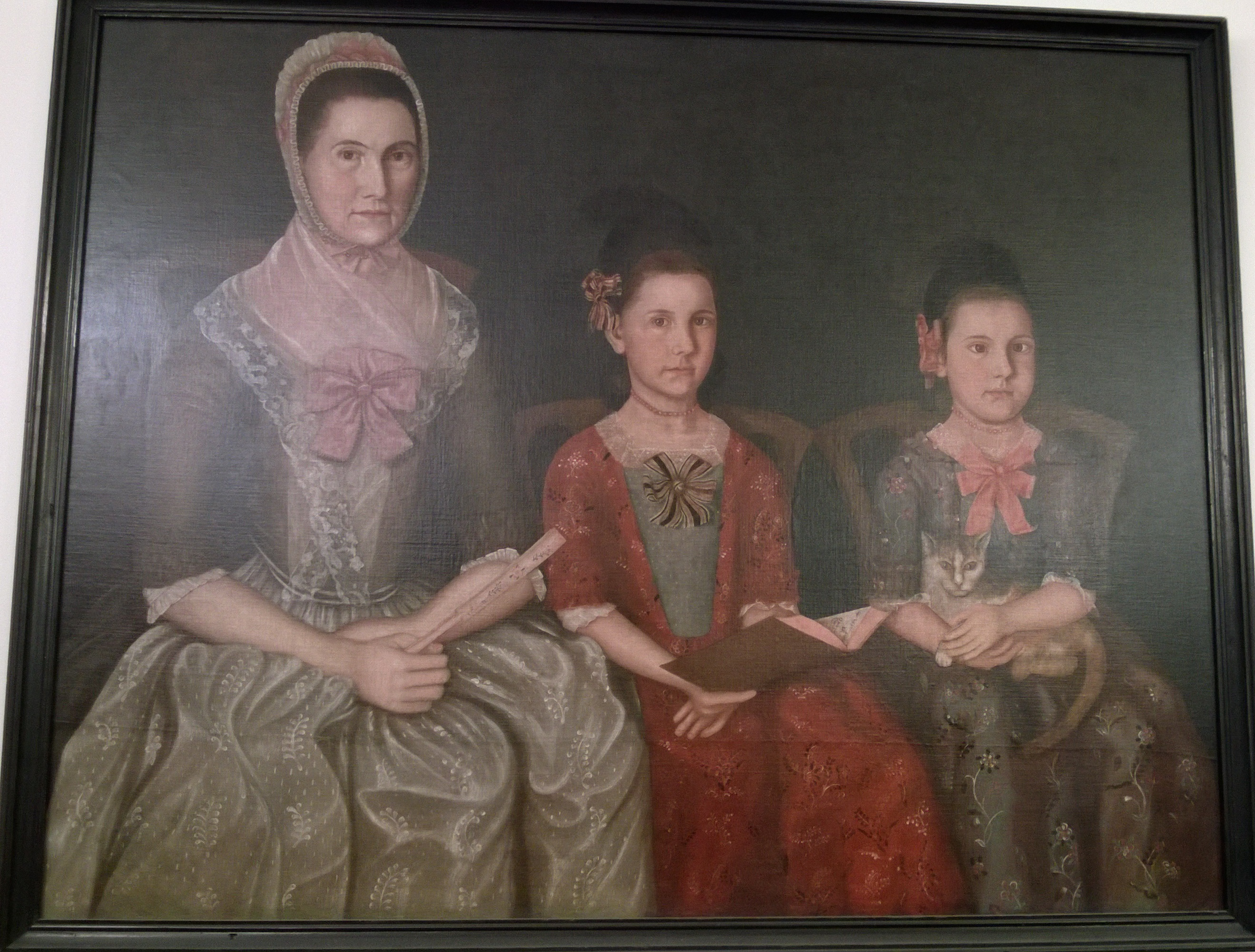
Mrs. Ebenezer Crafts (1741-1812) and her daughters Matilda (1771-1848) and Augusta (1772-1861), 1781, by Winthrop Chandler

Crafts was born in Pomfret, Connecticut, and studied theology, graduating from Yale College in 1759. He married Mehitable Chandler, sister of the painter Winthrop Chandler, on 9 December 1762. Mehitable was from the town next to Pomfret, Woodstock, Connecticut, where the couple settled in 1768. Crafts later purchased a farm in the neighboring town of Sturbridge, Massachusetts, where he built the large Publick House in the center of the village. The couple kept a tavern there for many years and they acquired a large estate. After the battles of Lexington and Concord, he raised a company of cavalry in the adjoining towns of Sturbridge, Charlton, Dudley, and Oxford, and was commissioned its captain. He was ordered to join the army with it at Cambridge, and remained in the service until the evacuation of Boston by the British troops, when he returned to Sturbridge. In 1785, a regiment of cavalry was ordered to be raised in Worcester County, Massachusetts. Of this regiment he was commissioned its first colonel, an office which he held until his resignation in 1791. During the outbreak known as "Shays' Rebellion," in western Massachusetts, he rendered prompt and efficient service in its suppression, under Gen. Benjamin Lincoln, in the winter of 1786–1787.

Col. Crafts conceived the idea of founding an academy in Sturbridge, but the opportunity to secure the mansion of Aaron Lopez, in the neighboring town of Leicester, Massachusetts, induced him to modify his plans. The mansion was a very suitable building, and the estate was purchased at auction for £515. A large oil portrait of Col. Crafts hangs upon the walls of Leicester Academy. He was aided largely in this enterprise by Col. Jacob Davis, and the first student on 17 June 1784 was his son Samuel C. Crafts.

Falling on hard times, in 1788 Crafts was forced to move and settled in 1791 in a town near Cabot, Vermont. It was later named after him. Crafts lived the rest of his life in Craftsbury, Vermont. He died and was buried there in 1810.
