= Elm Park (Worcester, Massachusetts) =

- U.S. National Register of Historic Places
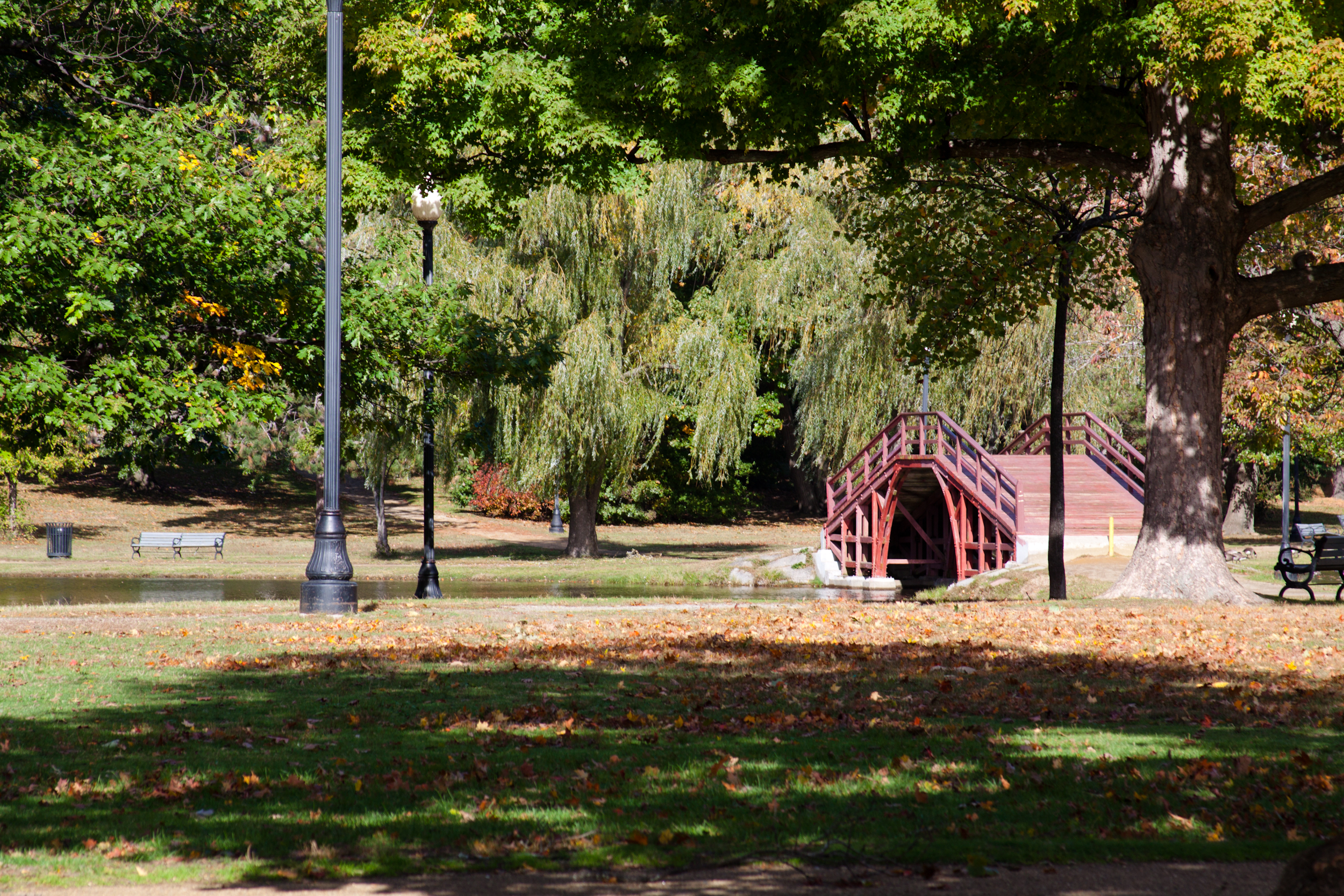

- Location within Massachusetts Location within the United States
- Location: Elm Park, Worcester, Massachusetts
- Coordinates: 42°16′3″N 71°49′13″W
- Built: 1854
- Architect: Lincoln, Edward Winslow
- MPS: Worcester MRA
- NRHP reference No.: 70000096
- Added to NRHP: July 01, 1970

Elm Park is an historic park in Worcester, Massachusetts.

The land the park resides on was purchased in 1854, making it one of the first public purchases of land expressly intended for use as a municipal park in the United States, after Bushnell Park in Hartford, purchased earlier that year. (This is not to be confused with the oldest public park, Boston Common, established in 1634.)

Elm Park originally consisted of the land bordered by Park Avenue, Russell Street, Elm Street and Highland Street. In 1888, Newton Hill, just across Park Avenue, was purchased by the City of Worcester bringing the total park area to 60 acres (24 ha). The original portion of Elm Park (east of Park Avenue) was, up until the 1890s, merely more than pasture land. Beginning in 1909, it was redesigned and landscaped by the Olmsted Brothers firm. The firm landscaped additional elements in 1939–1941.

The park contains meandering walking paths through the landscaping, a pond crossed by two iconic footbridges and a playground. The Newton Hill portion of Elm Park (west of Park Avenue) remains far less landscaped and contains basketball and tennis courts, walking trails and also Doherty Memorial High School, a high school within the Worcester Public Schools system. St. Spyridon Greek Orthodox Cathedral (founded around 1920) is located adjacent to the park on Russell Street. Grace Christian Center, formerly Park Congregational Church, is also located across from the park at the corner of Russell and Elm Streets. That church was built in the early 1880s, when the Worcester City Missionary Society recommended that a Congregational church be established on the West Side.

It was added to the National Register of Historic Places in 1970.

== Photos ==
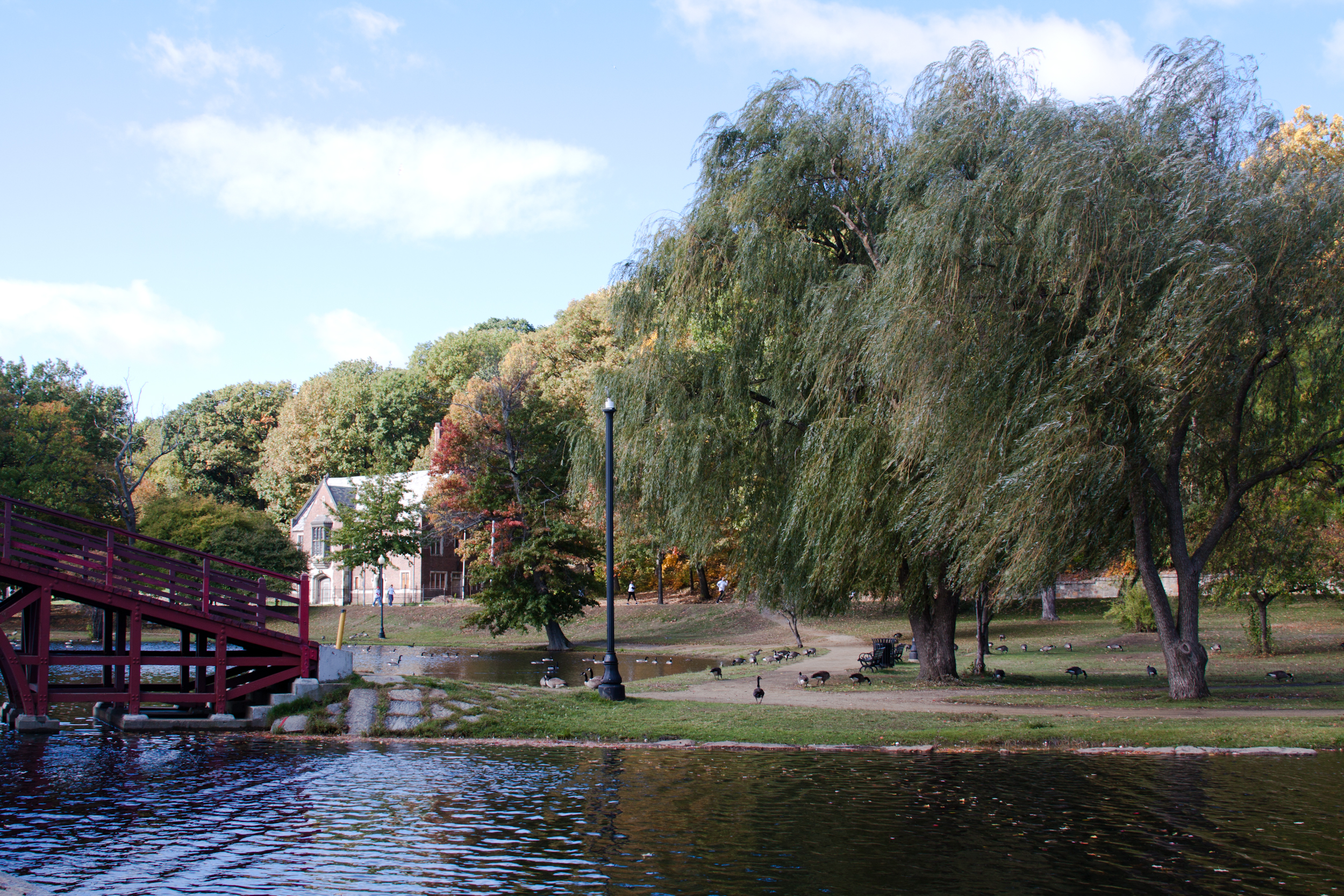
Footpaths

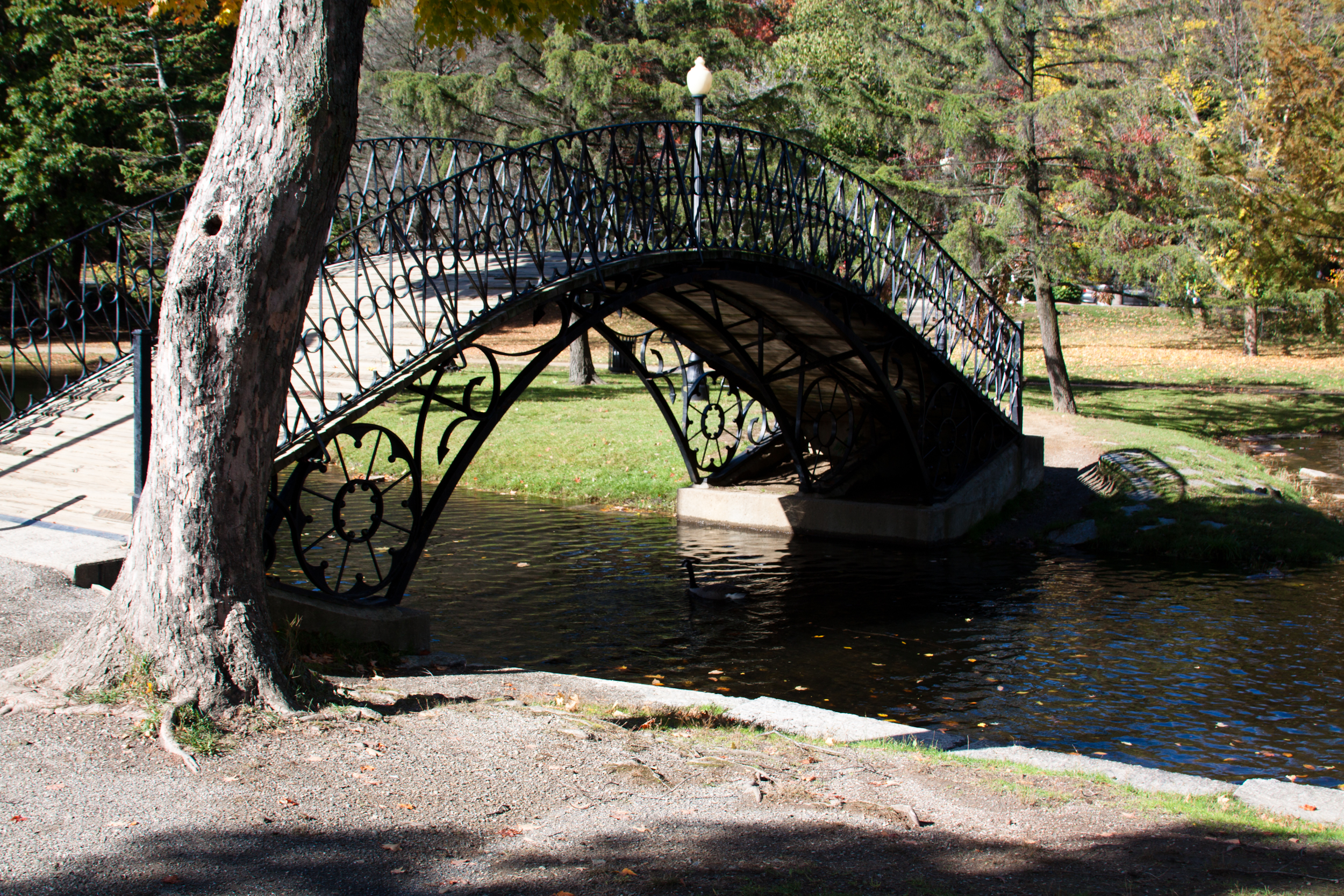
The "Iron Bridge"

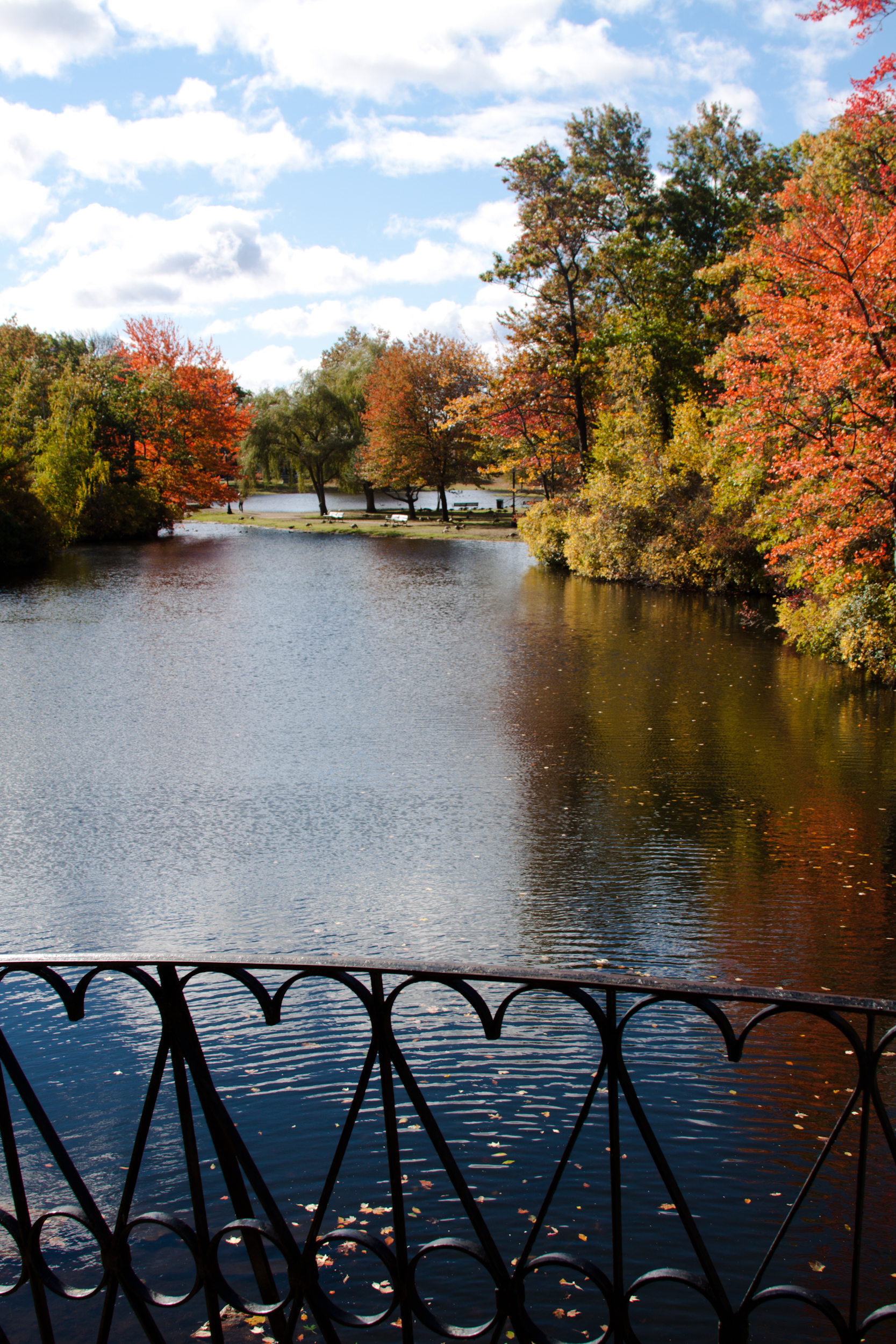
The pond

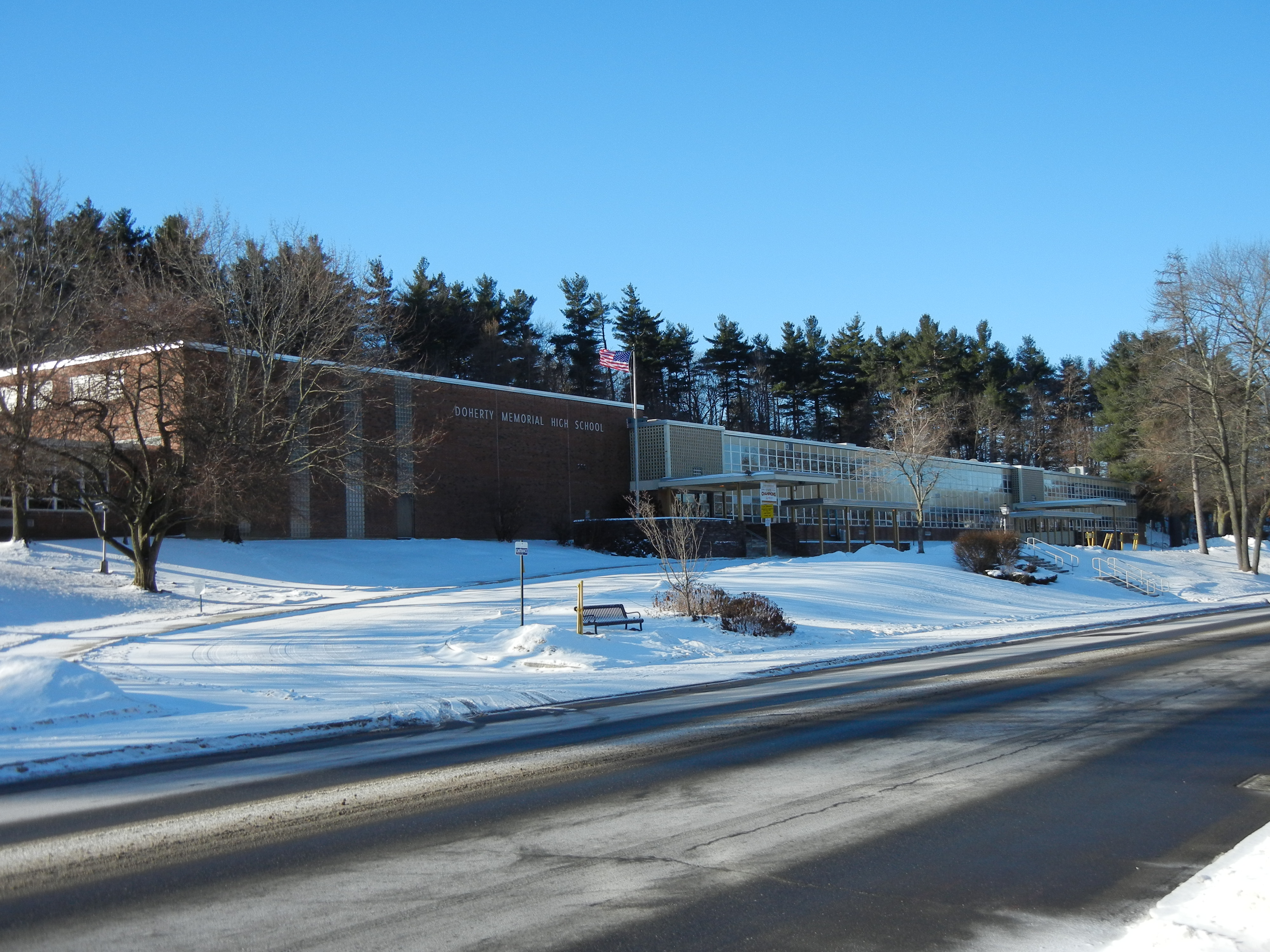
Doherty High School

== See also ==
- National Register of Historic Places listings in northwestern Worcester, Massachusetts
- National Register of Historic Places listings in Worcester County, Massachusetts
