= Chris Johansen =

American politician (born 1952)

Member of the Maine House of Representatives from the 145th district
- In office 2016 – November 19, 2021
- Preceded by: Ricky Long

Personal details
- Born: April 3, 1952 (age 74) Brooklyn, New York
- Party: Republican
- Spouse: Cindy (died in August 2021)
- Children: 2
- Occupation: Retired law enforcement officer

Chris A. Johansen (born April 3, 1952) is an American politician from Maine. He served as a Republican in the Maine House of Representatives for Maine's 145th House of Representatives district, which comprises 20 towns in Aroostook County. An outspoken opponent of state-mandated public health measures put in place during the COVID-19 pandemic, his wife later died from the disease. He resigned from office on November 19, 2021.

== Maine House of Representatives ==
Johansen was first elected to the Maine House of Representatives in 2016, replacing incumbent Ricky Long, who did not seek re-election. Johansen was re-elected to the Maine House in both 2018 and 2020.

=== COVID-19 ===
During the COVID-19 pandemic in Maine, Johansen was an outspoken opponent of state-mandated public health precautions taken in Maine to reduce the spread of COVID-19. In April 2020 he organized two protests in the State Capitol against statewide business shutdowns, acknowledging the virus was public health threat but arguing restrictions should be relaxed in rural areas and calling for a limited reopening of the state's economy. He later joined a group of House lawmakers who refused to wear face masks in the Maine State House despite being required by House leadership to do so. A staged confrontation between these lawmakers and Capitol police drew media attention and lead to the representatives being stripped of their committee assignments for a period of time.

In late July 2021, both Johansen and his wife, Cindy, became ill with COVID-19. Cindy was admitted to the hospital, and died on August 11. A week following her death, Johansen attended a rally in opposition to vaccine mandates for healthcare workers at the Maine State House. He later wrote his wife was reluctant to be vaccinated due to "the conflicting information we have been getting from day one."

On November 19, 2021, Johansen sent a letter to House Speaker Ryan Fecteau announcing his resignation, citing a need to tend to the family farm following his wife's death.

== Career and personal life ==
Johansen is a veteran of the United States Marine Corps and the Vietnam War. He is retired from a career in law enforcement and lives in Monticello, Maine. Johansen has two children, three grandchildren and one great-grandchild. He is a lifetime member of the Veterans of Foreign Wars and the National Rifle Association of America.

== Electoral history ==
2016 Maine House District 145 Republican Primary
Party	Candidate	Votes	%
Republican	Chris Johansen	325	52.9%
Republican	Roger Bouchard	290	47.1%
Total votes		615	100.0%

2016 Maine House District 145 General Election
Party	Candidate	Votes	%
Republican	Chris Johansen	2,653	59.9%
Independent	Randy Rockwell	936	21.1%
Democratic	Glenn Hines	842	19.0%
Total votes		4,431	100.0%

2018 Maine House District 145 Republican Primary
Party	Candidate	Votes	%
Republican	Chris Johansen	716	100.0%
Total votes		716	100.0%

2018 Maine House District 145 General Election
Party	Candidate	Votes	%
Republican	Chris Johansen	2,281	66.5%
Democratic	Laura Farnsworth	1,148	33.5%
Total votes		3,429	100.0%

2020 Maine House District 145 Republican Primary
Party	Candidate	Votes	%
Republican	Chris Johansen	738	100.0%
Total votes		738	100.0%

2020 Maine House District 145 General Election
Party	Candidate	Votes	%
Republican	Chris Johansen	3,484	76.7%
Democratic	Robert Zabierek	1,058	23.3%
Total votes		4,542	100.0%
