= Timeline of the 2020 Democratic Party presidential primaries =

Events of Democratic nominee selection

The following is a timeline of the 2020 Democratic Party presidential primaries in the United States, beginning after the election of Donald Trump in the 2016 United States presidential election. Joe Biden won the primary and eventually defeated Trump in the 2020 United States presidential election.

== 2017 ==
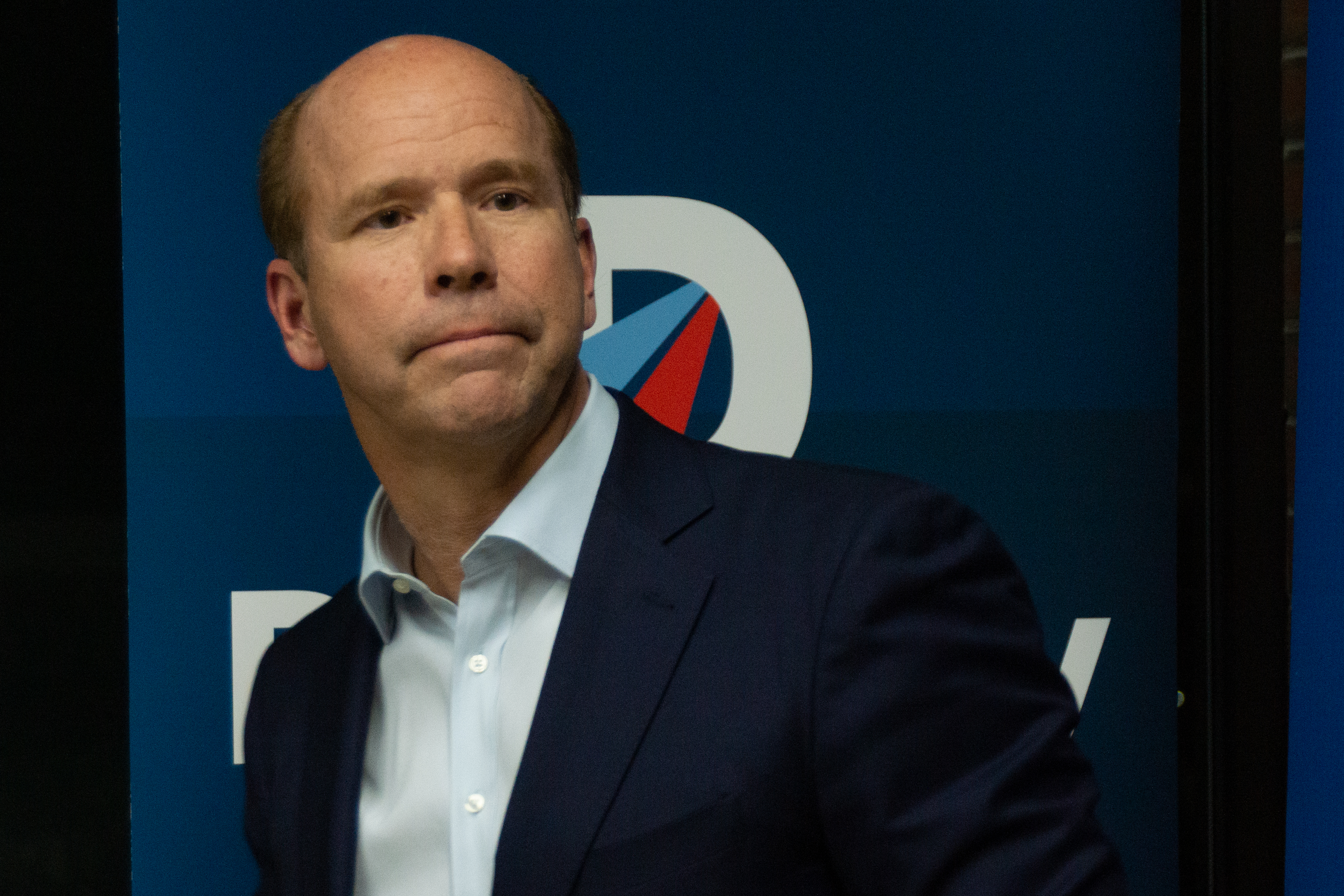
Rep. John Delaney was the first major candidate to announce his campaign, two and a half years before the 2020 Iowa caucus.

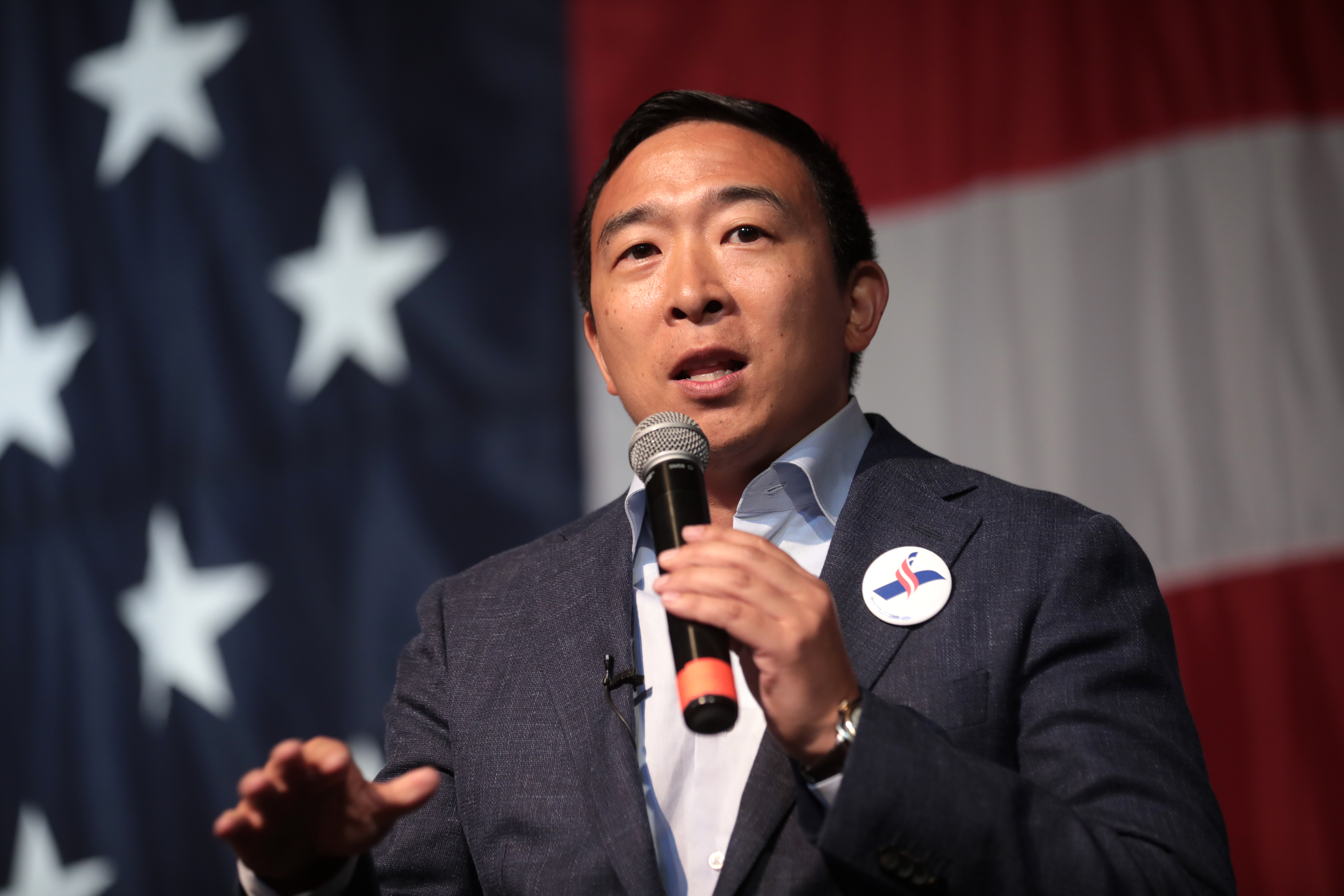
Entrepreneur Andrew Yang was the second major Democratic candidate to announce his campaign.

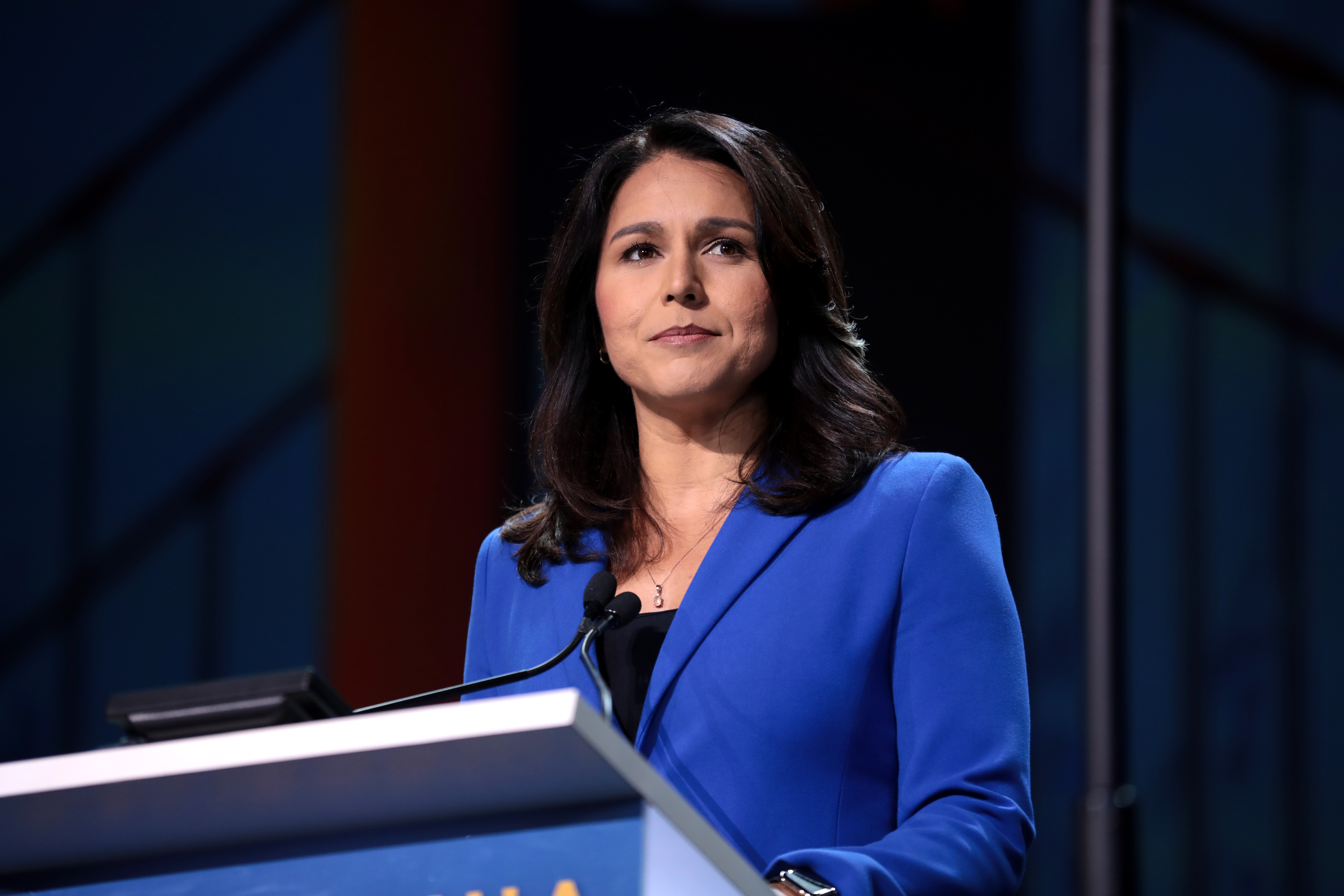
Rep. Tulsi Gabbard became the first major female candidate to announce her candidacy on January 11, 2019.

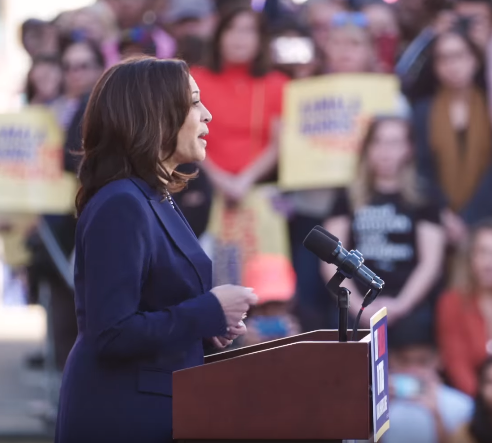
Sen. Kamala Harris launched her bid on January 21, 2019.

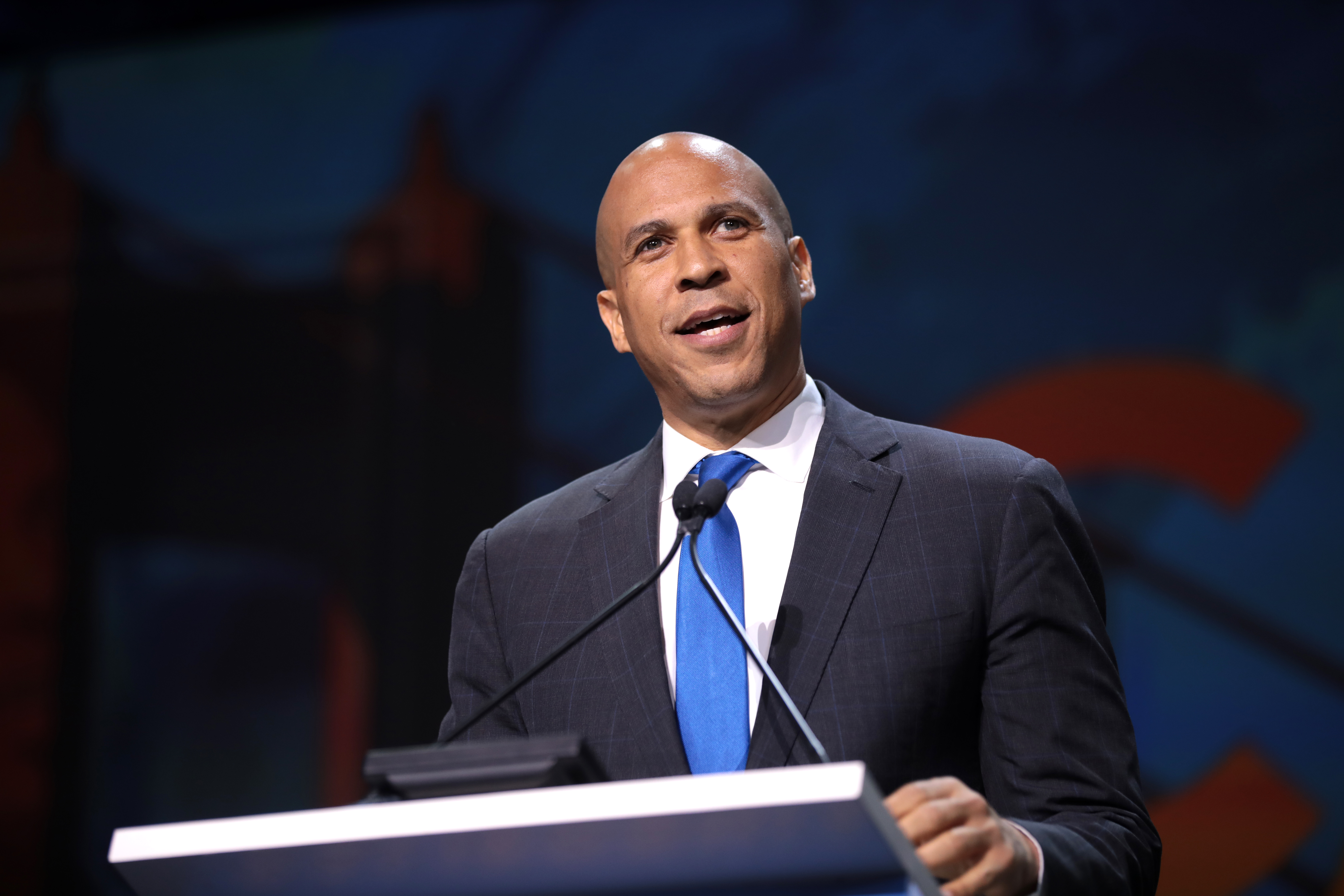
Sen. Cory Booker launched his bid on February 1, 2019.

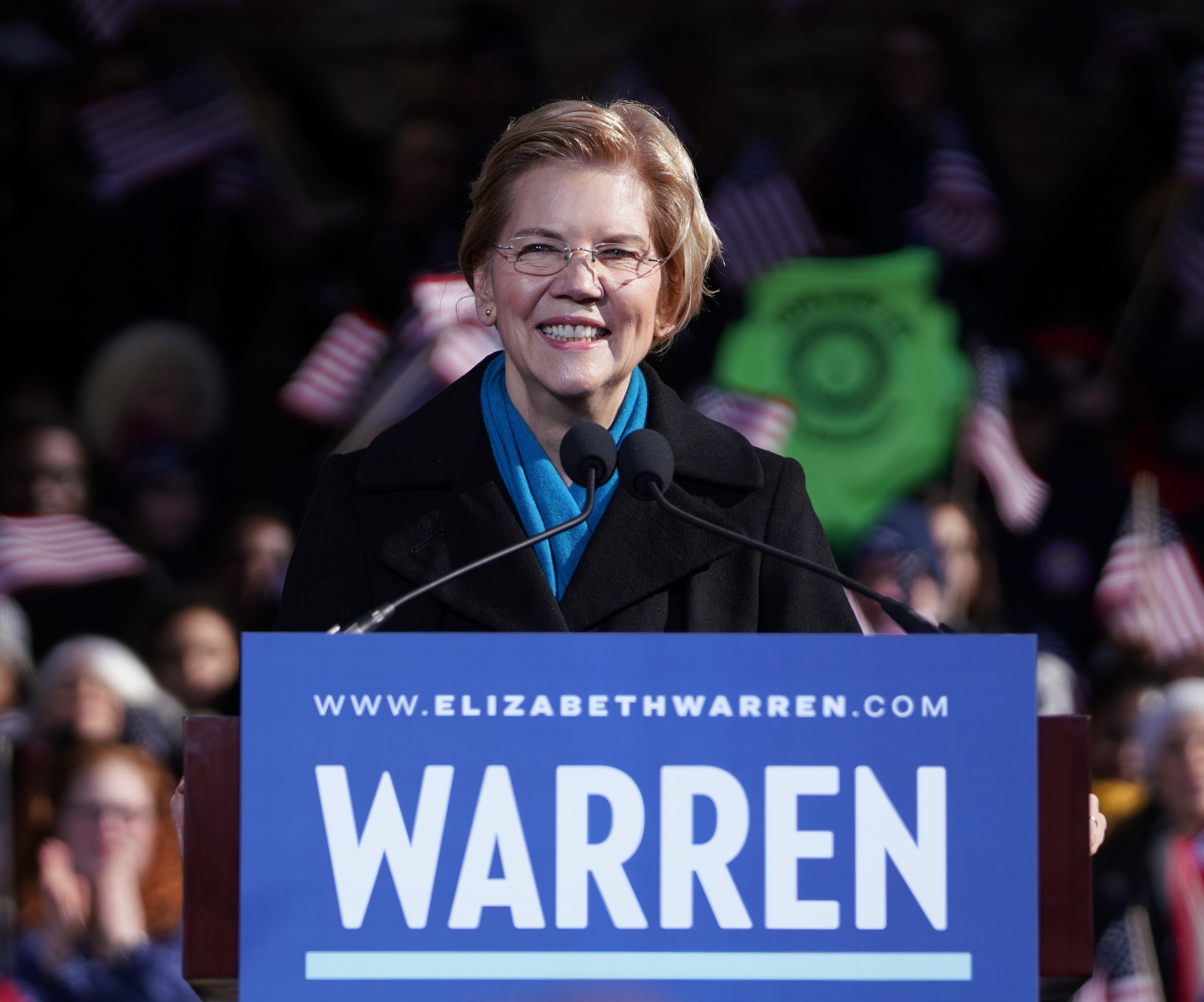
Sen. Elizabeth Warren launched her bid on February 9, 2019.

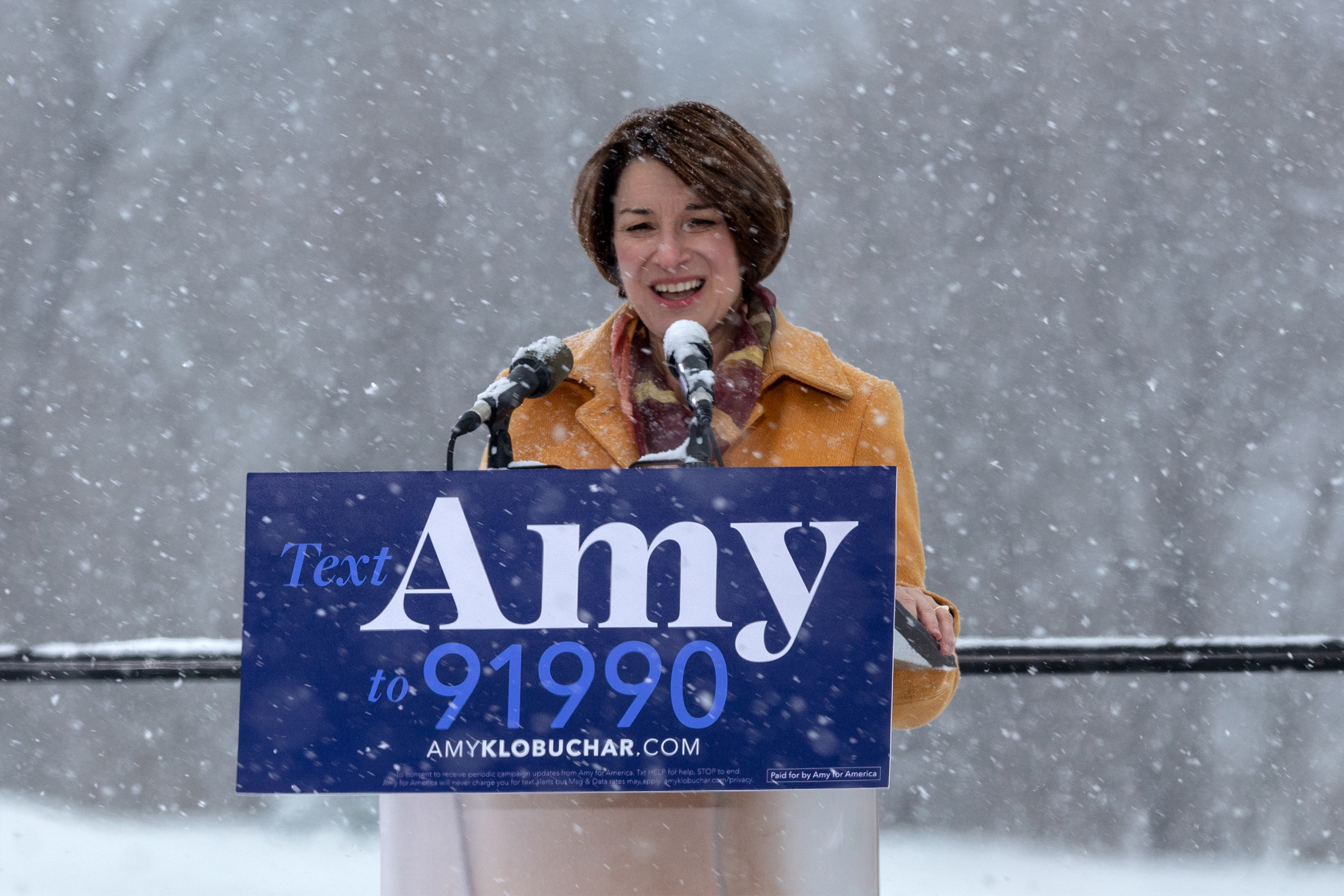
Sen. Amy Klobuchar launched her bid on February 10, 2019.

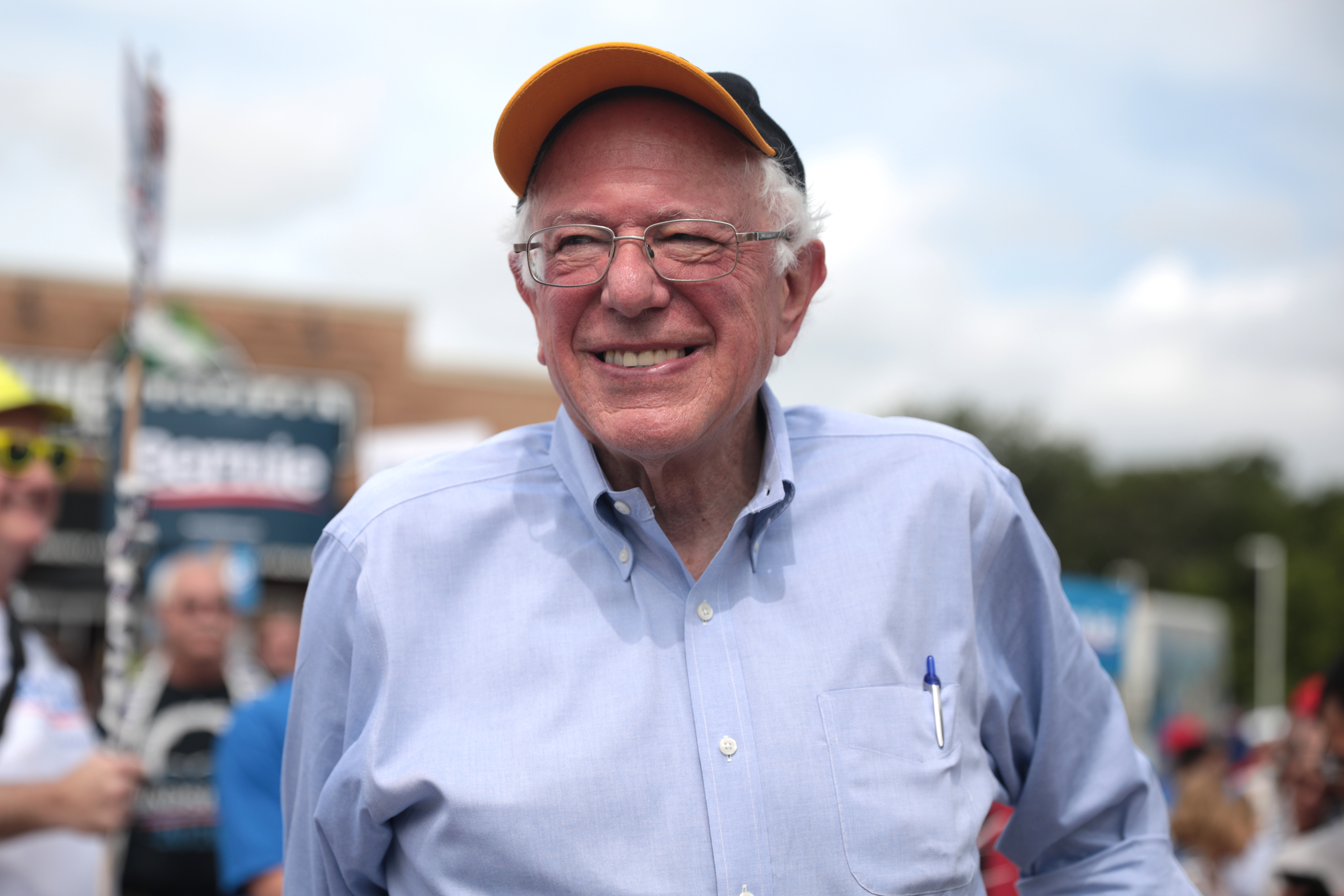
Sen. Bernie Sanders launched his second campaign on February 19, 2019.

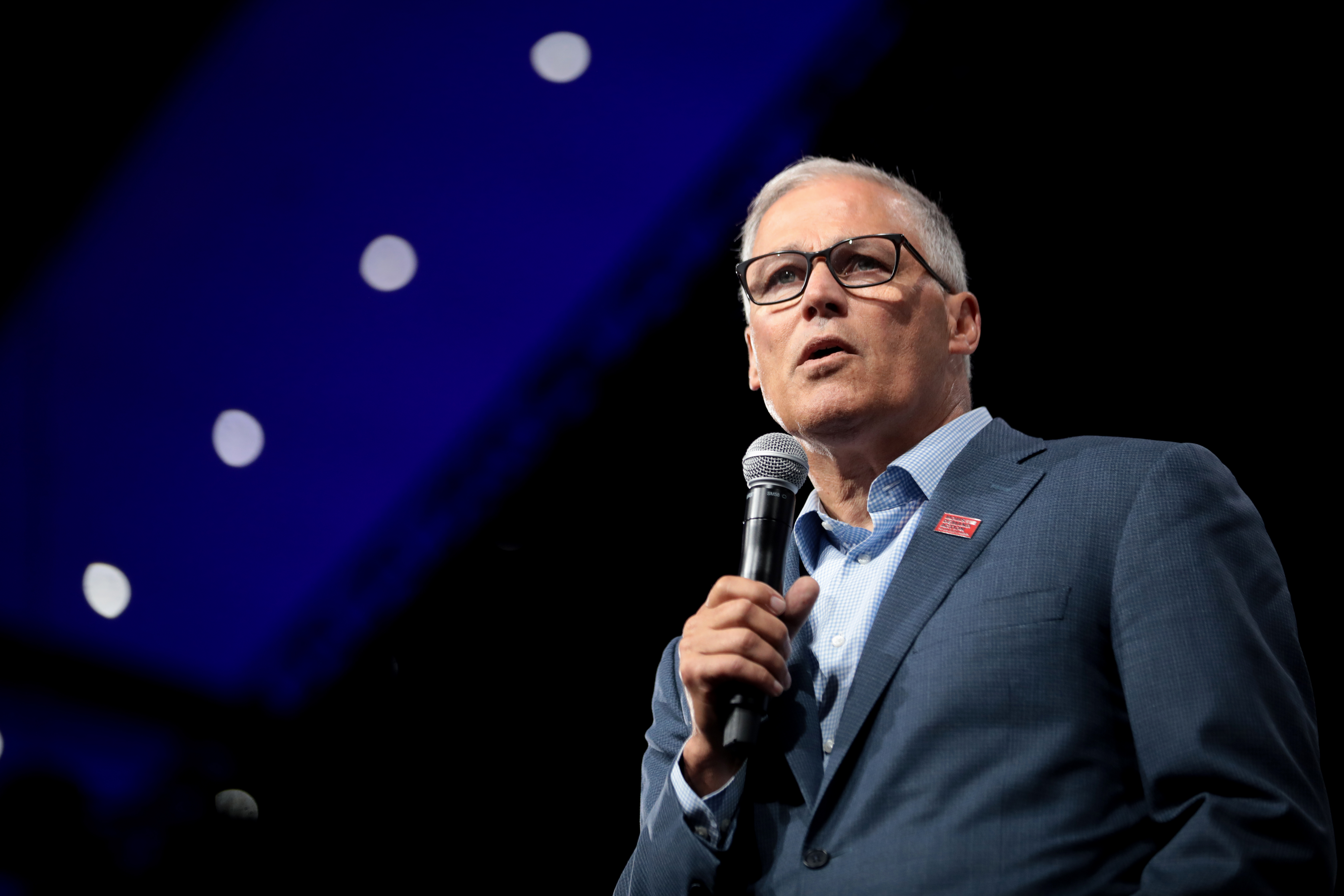
Governor Jay Inslee launched his presidential bid on March 1, 2019, becoming the first incumbent governor to do so.

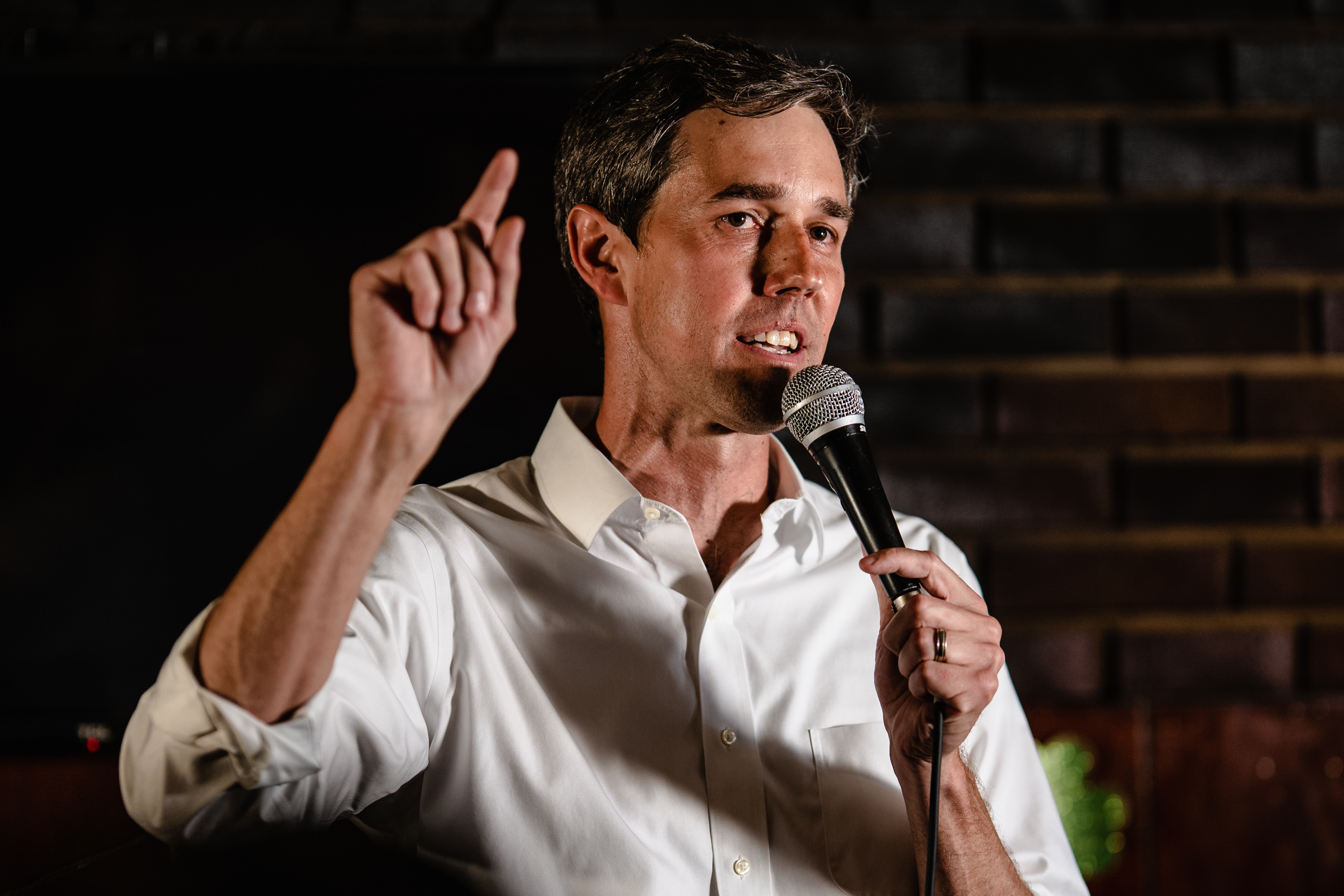
Former Rep. Beto O'Rourke launched his bid on March 14, 2019.

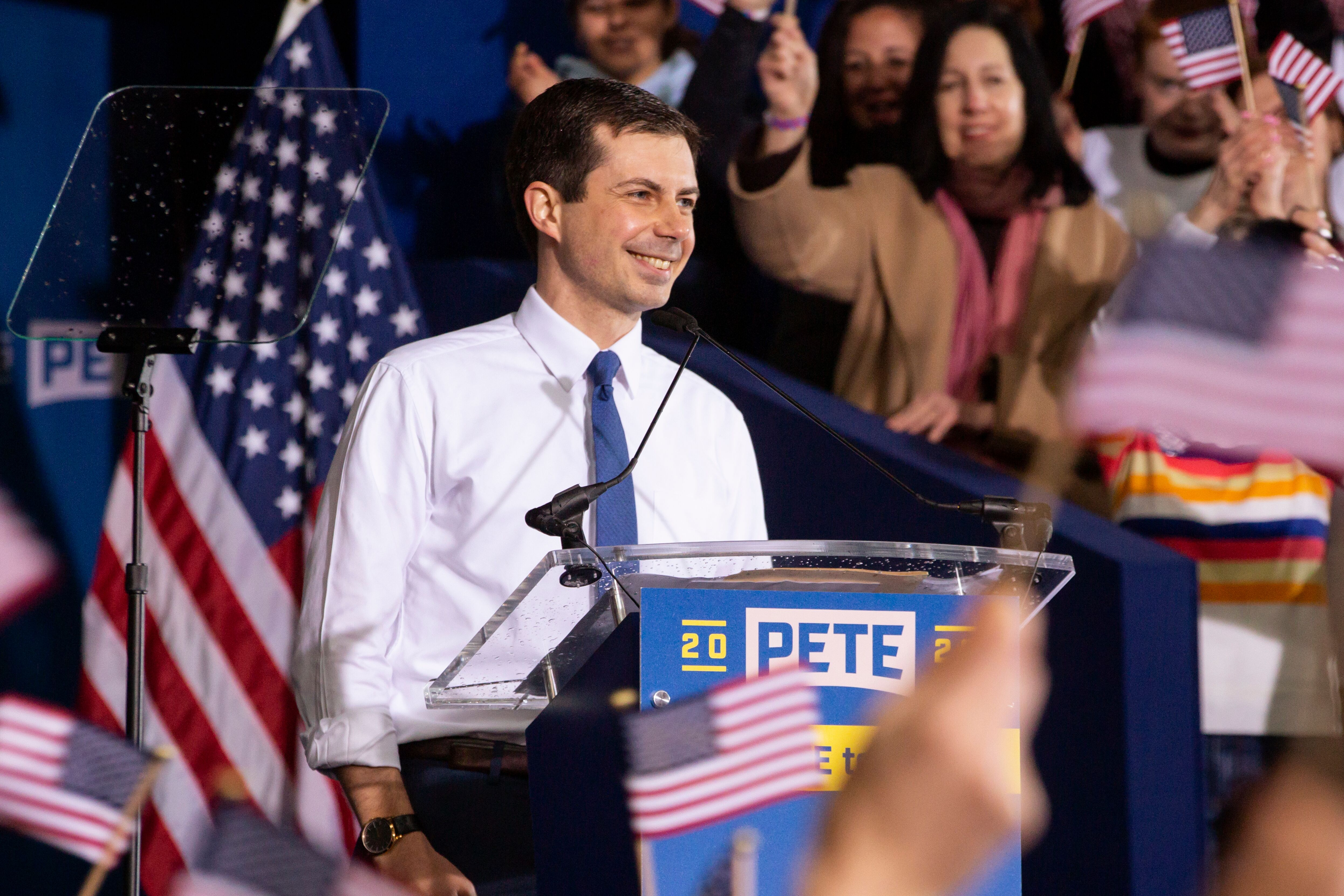
Mayor Pete Buttigieg launched his bid on April 14, 2019.

In the weeks following the election of Donald Trump in the 2016 election, media speculation regarding potential candidates for the 2020 Democratic Party presidential primaries began to circulate. As the Senate began confirmation hearings for members of the cabinet, speculation centered on the prospects of the "hell-no caucus", six senators who went on to vote against the majority of Trump's nominees. According to Politico, the members of the "hell-no caucus" were Cory Booker, Kamala Harris, Kirsten Gillibrand, Bernie Sanders, Jeff Merkley, and Elizabeth Warren. Other speculation centered on then-Vice-President Joe Biden making a third presidential bid following failed attempts in 1988 and 2008.

=== July 2017 ===
- July 28: Representative John Delaney of Maryland announced his candidacy in an op-ed in The Washington Post, which broke the record for earliest major candidacy declaration in history.

=== November 2017 ===
- November 6: Entrepreneur Andrew Yang of New York announced his candidacy.

== 2018 ==
=== March 2018 ===
The Democratic National Committee (DNC) made changes to the role of superdelegates, deciding to allow them to vote on the first ballot only if the nomination is uncontested.

=== August 2018 ===
Democratic Party officials and television networks began discussions as to the nature and scheduling of the following year's debates and the nomination process.

=== November 2018 ===
- November 6: The 2018 midterm elections were held. The election was widely characterized as a "blue wave" election. Mass canvassing, voter registration drives and deep engagement techniques drove turnout high. Despite this, eventual presidential candidates U.S. Representative Beto O'Rourke of Texas and State Senator Richard Ojeda of West Virginia both lost their respective races.
- November 11: Former state senator Richard Ojeda of West Virginia announced his candidacy.

=== December 2018 ===
- December 20: The DNC announced the preliminary schedule for the 12 official DNC-sanctioned debates, set to begin in June 2019, with six debates in 2019 and the remaining six during the first four months of 2020.
- December 31: U.S. Senator Elizabeth Warren of Massachusetts announced the formation of an exploratory committee to run for president.

== 2019 ==
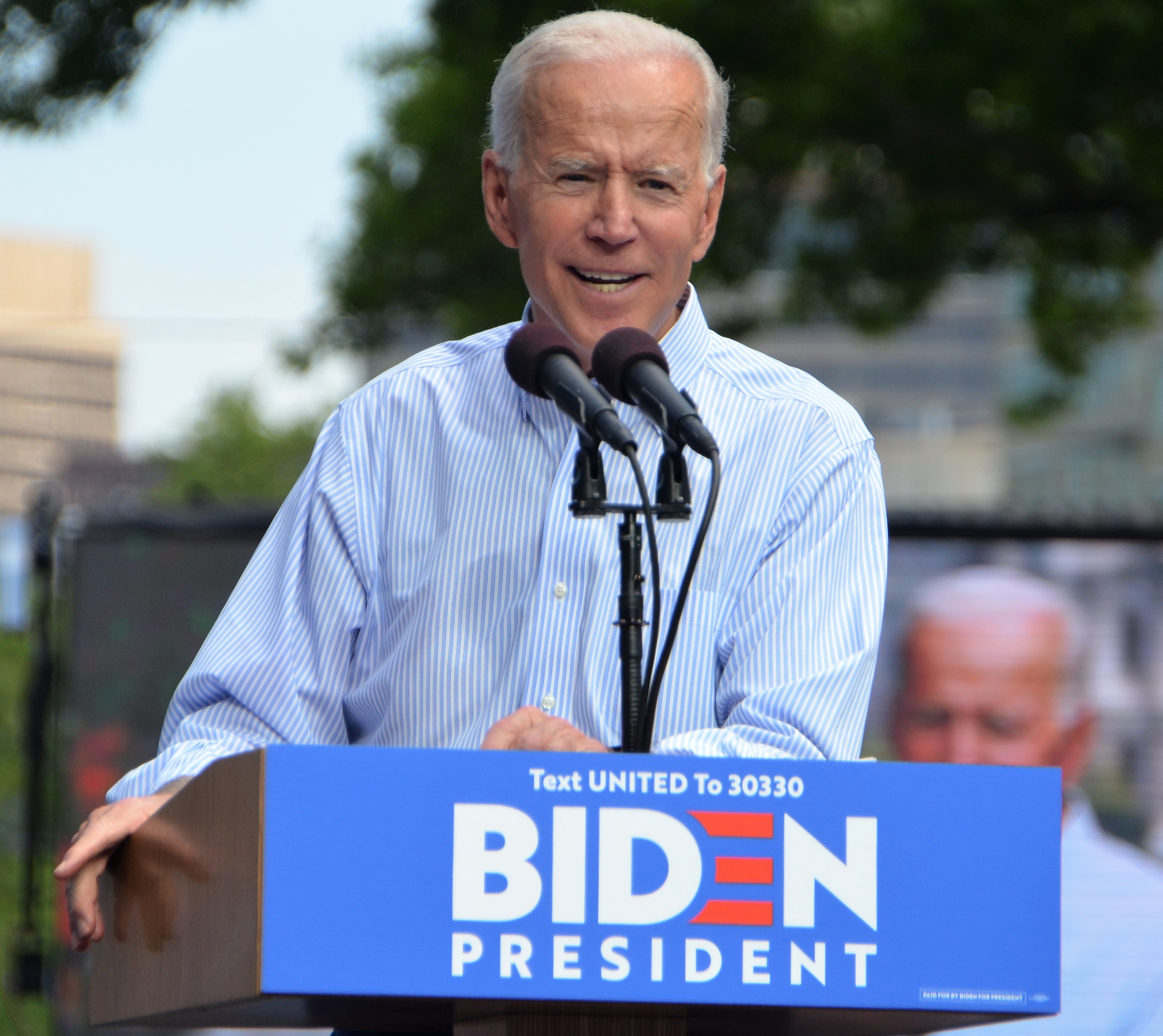
Former Vice President Joe Biden launched his third campaign on April 25, 2019.

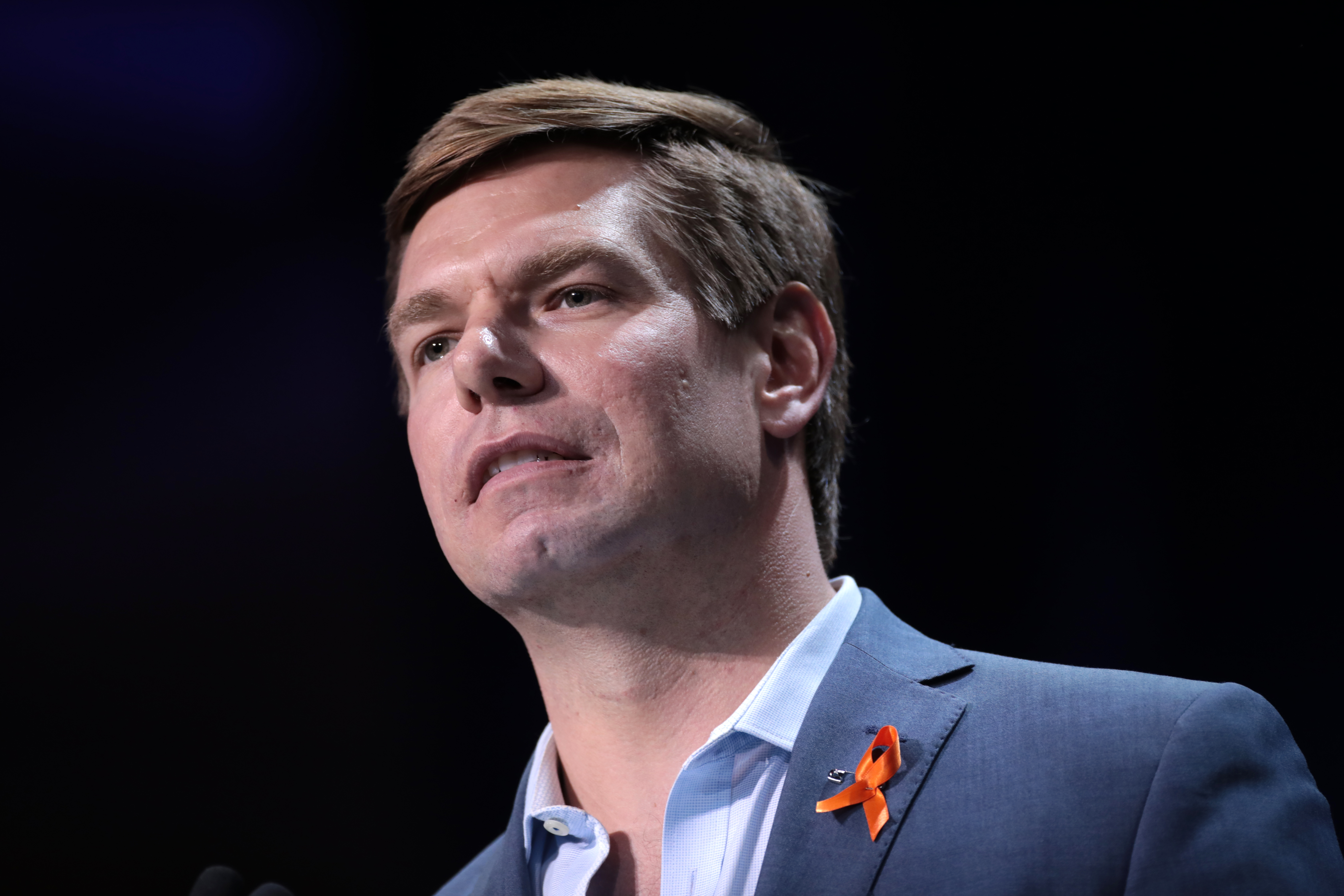
Rep. Eric Swalwell became the first representative to suspend their campaign following the first debate on July 8, 2019.

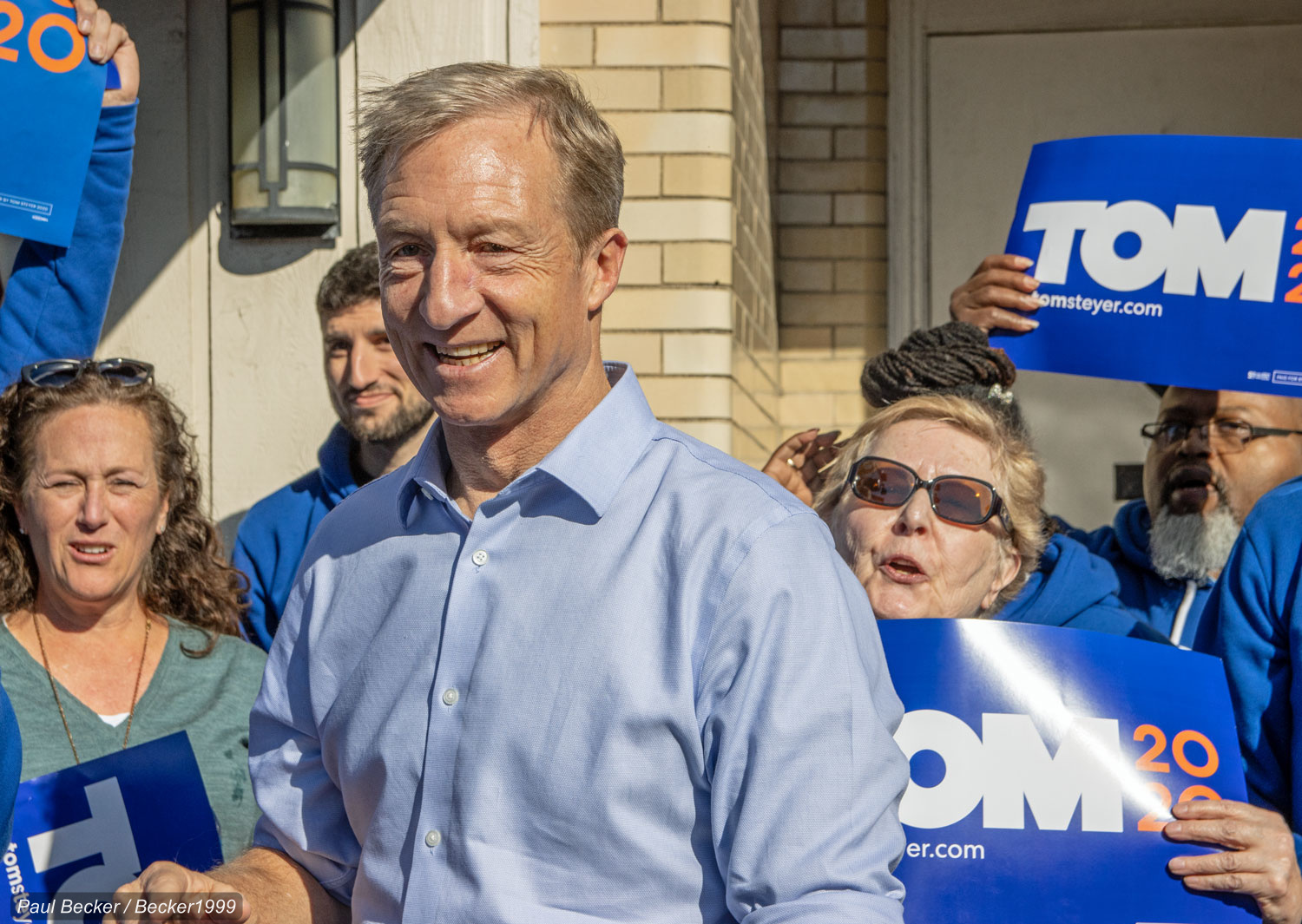
Billionaire hedge fund manager Tom Steyer launched his campaign on July 9, 2019.

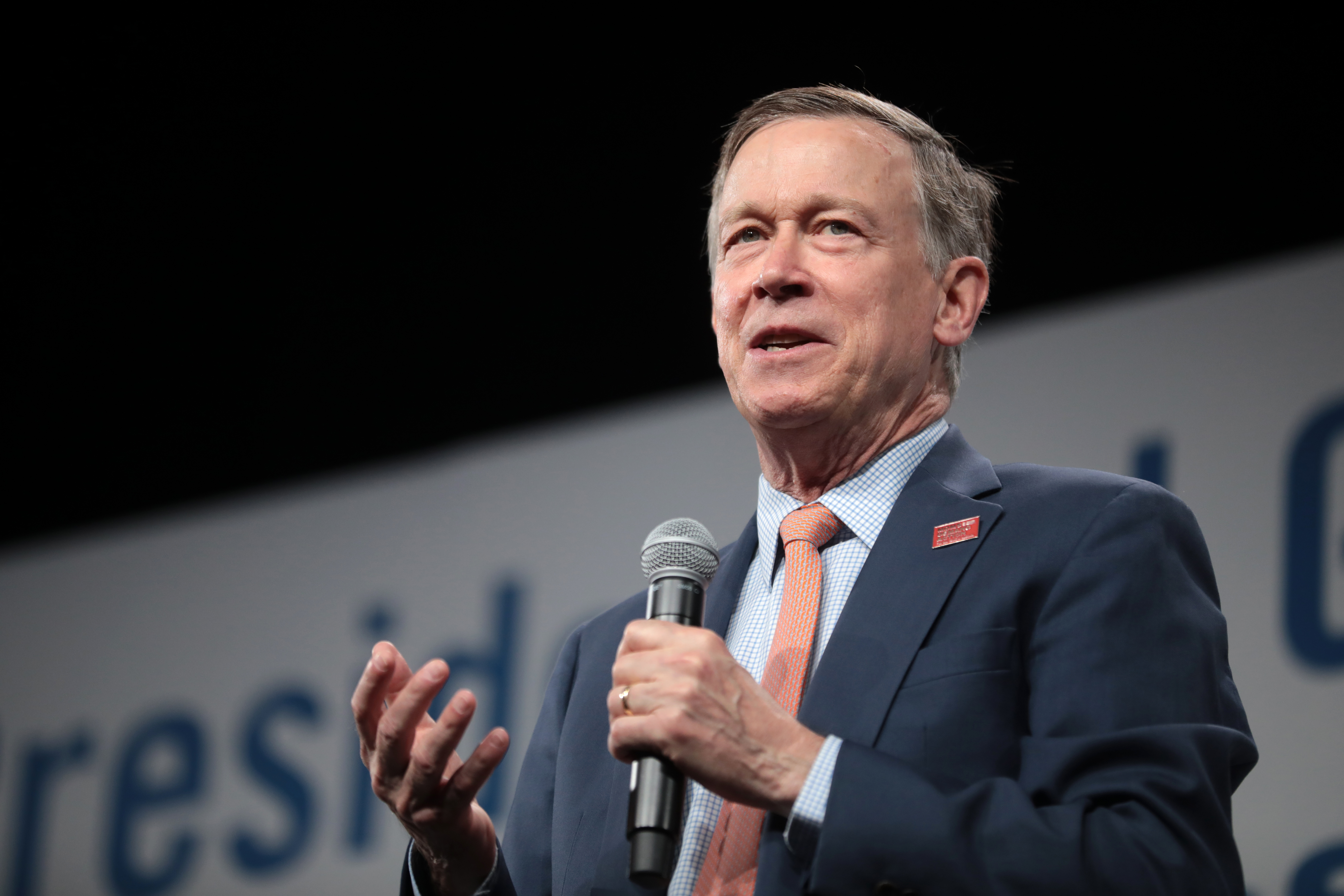
Former Governor John Hickenlooper suspended his campaign on August 15, 2019, and subsequently launched a bid for the United States Senate. He later endorsed Michael Bennet.

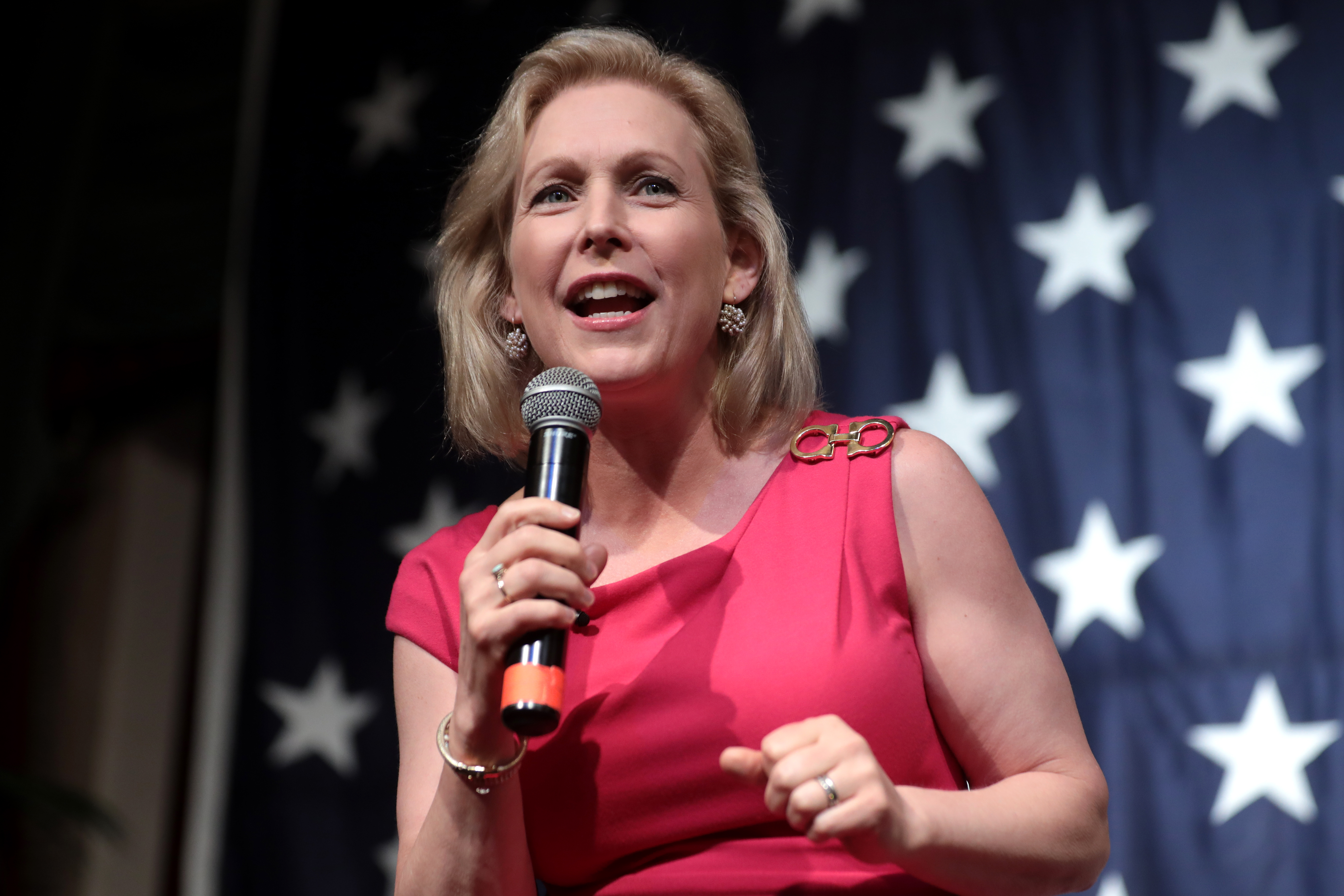
Kirsten Gillibrand became the first incumbent Senator and first female major candidate to suspend her campaign on August 28, 2019.

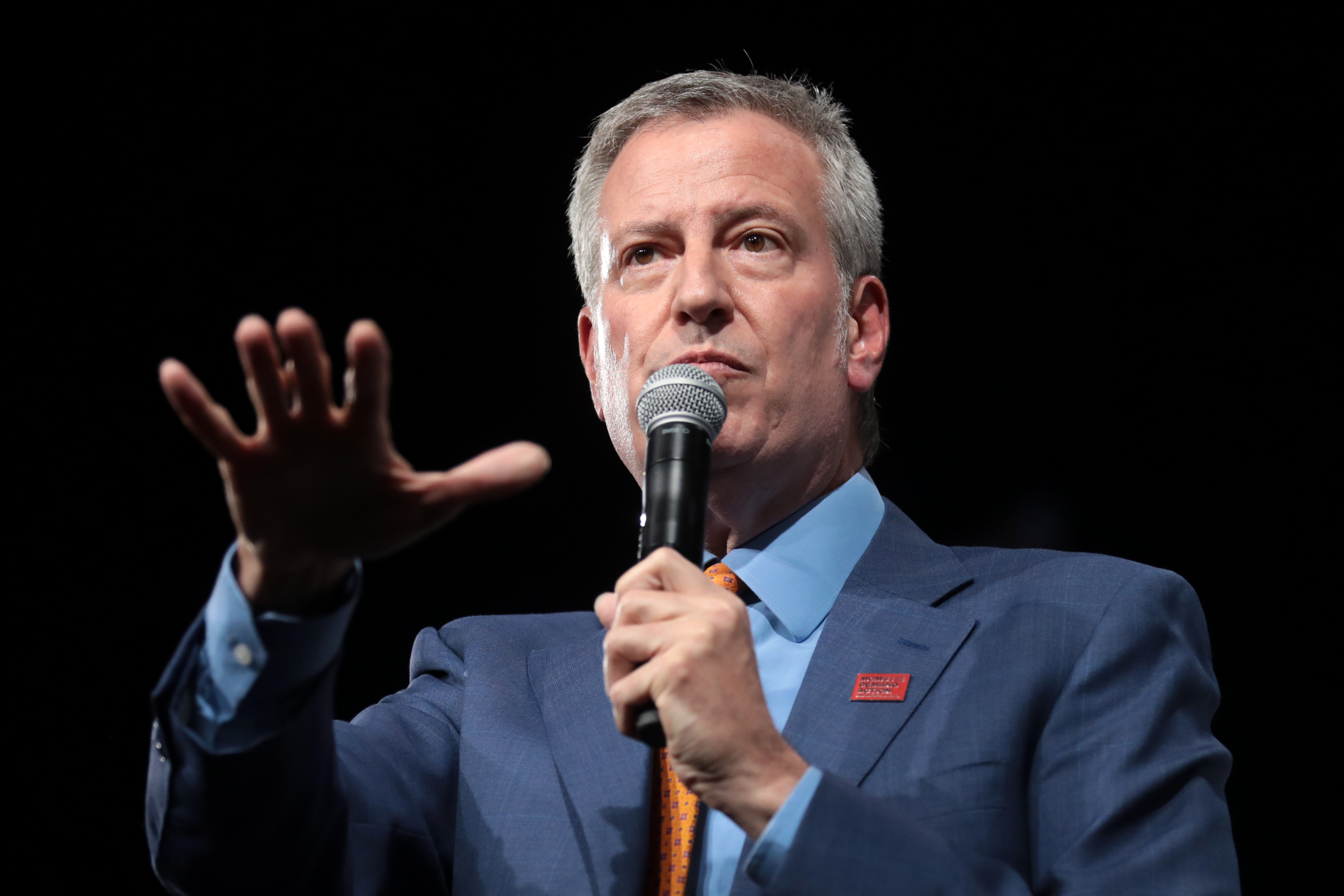
Mayor Bill de Blasio suspended his campaign on September 20, 2019, and endorsed Bernie Sanders after the New Hampshire primary.

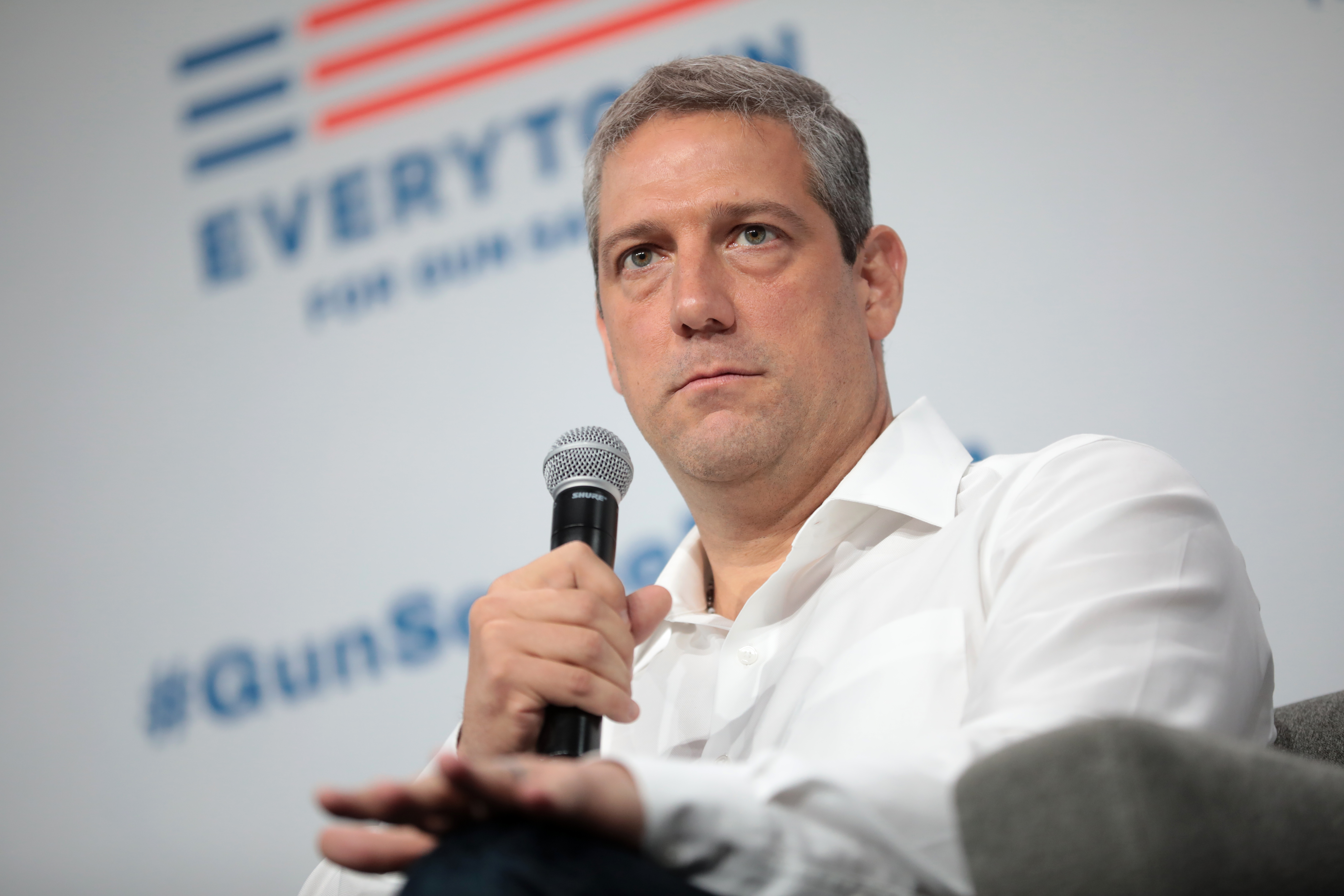
Rep. Tim Ryan suspended his campaign on October 24, 2019, and subsequently endorsed Joe Biden.

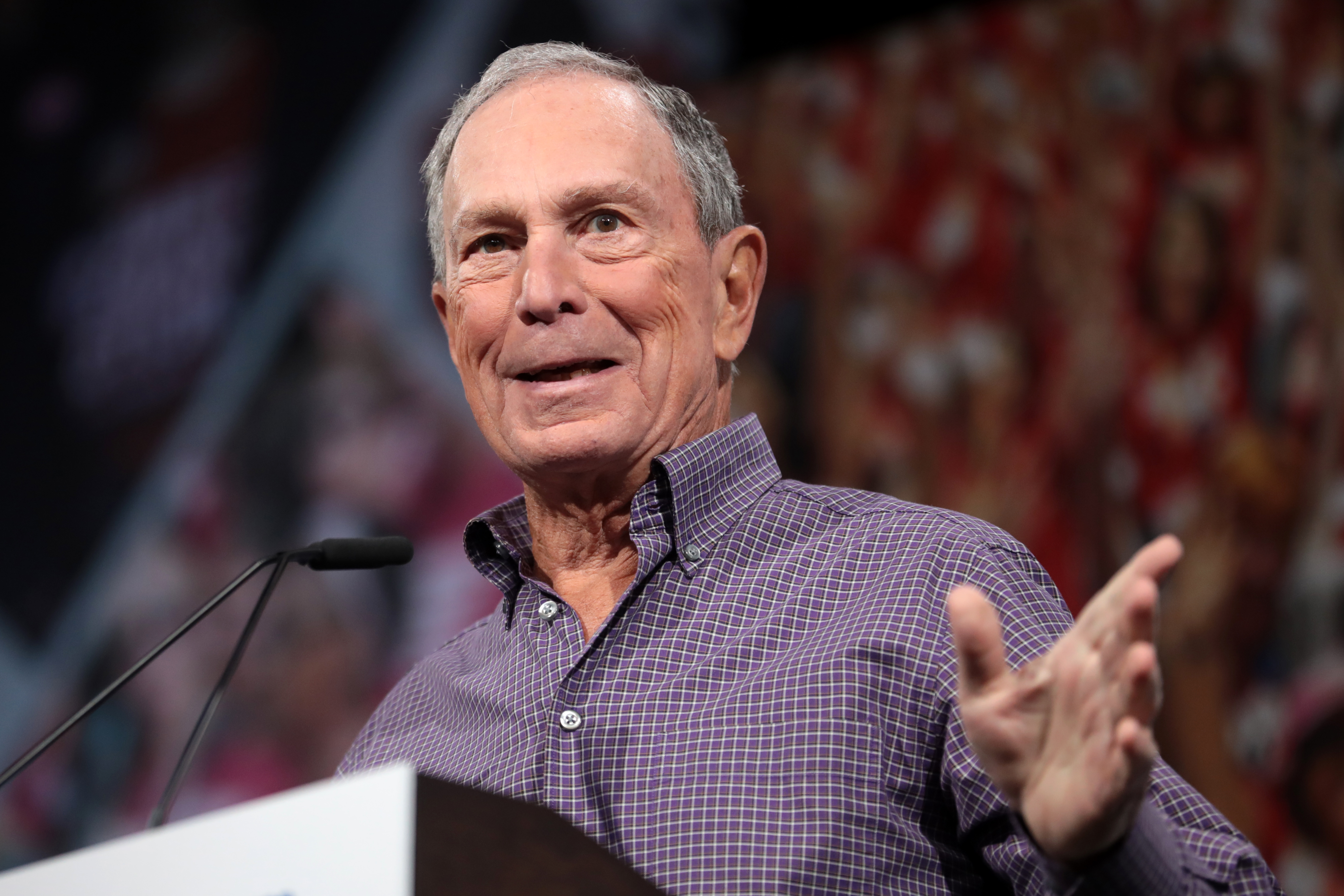
Former Mayor Michael Bloomberg launched his campaign via video on November 24, 2019.

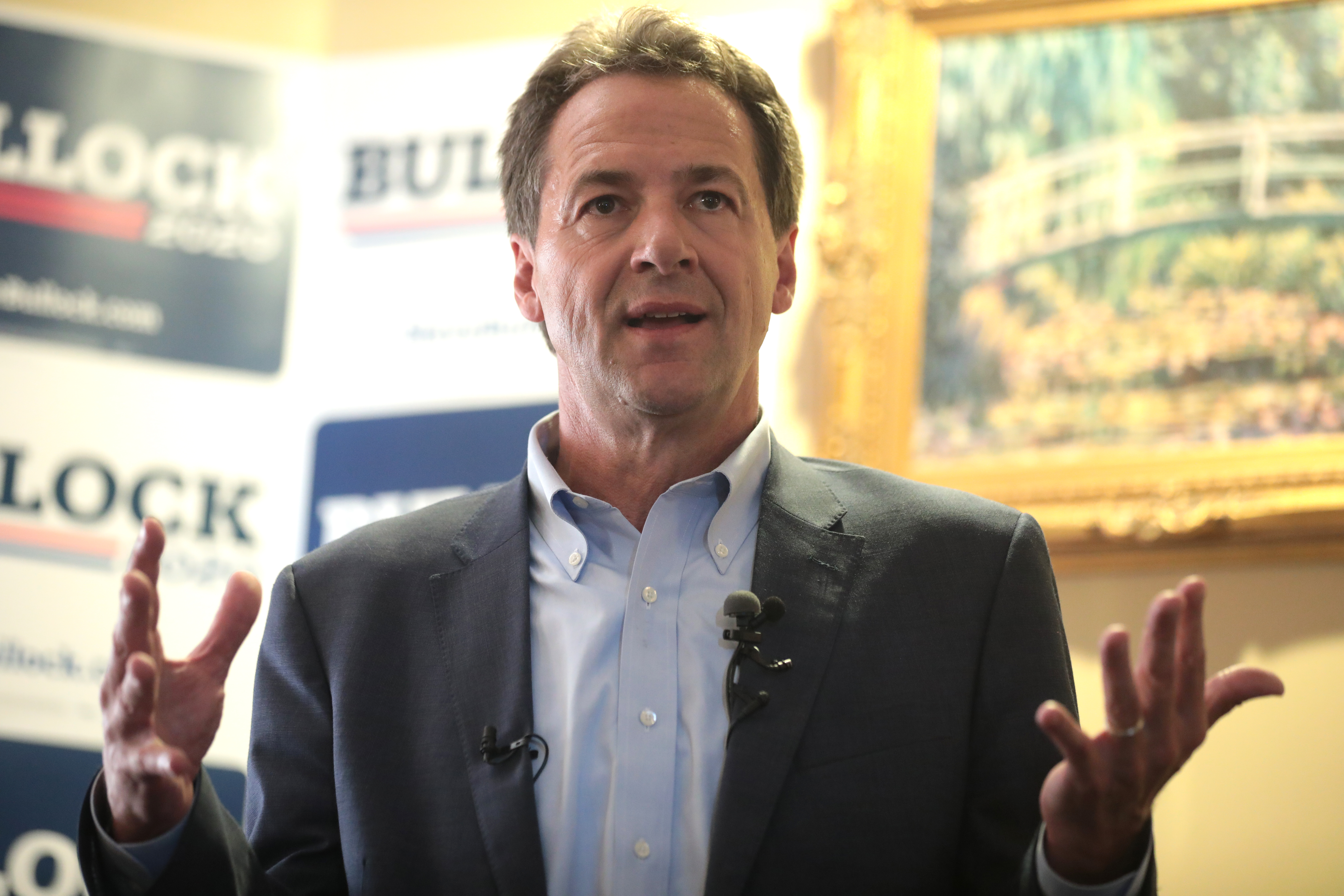
Governor Steve Bullock suspended his campaign and declined to run for the United States Senate on December 2, 2019. He later reversed his decision and challenged Senator Steve Daines after meeting with Barack Obama and Chuck Schumer.

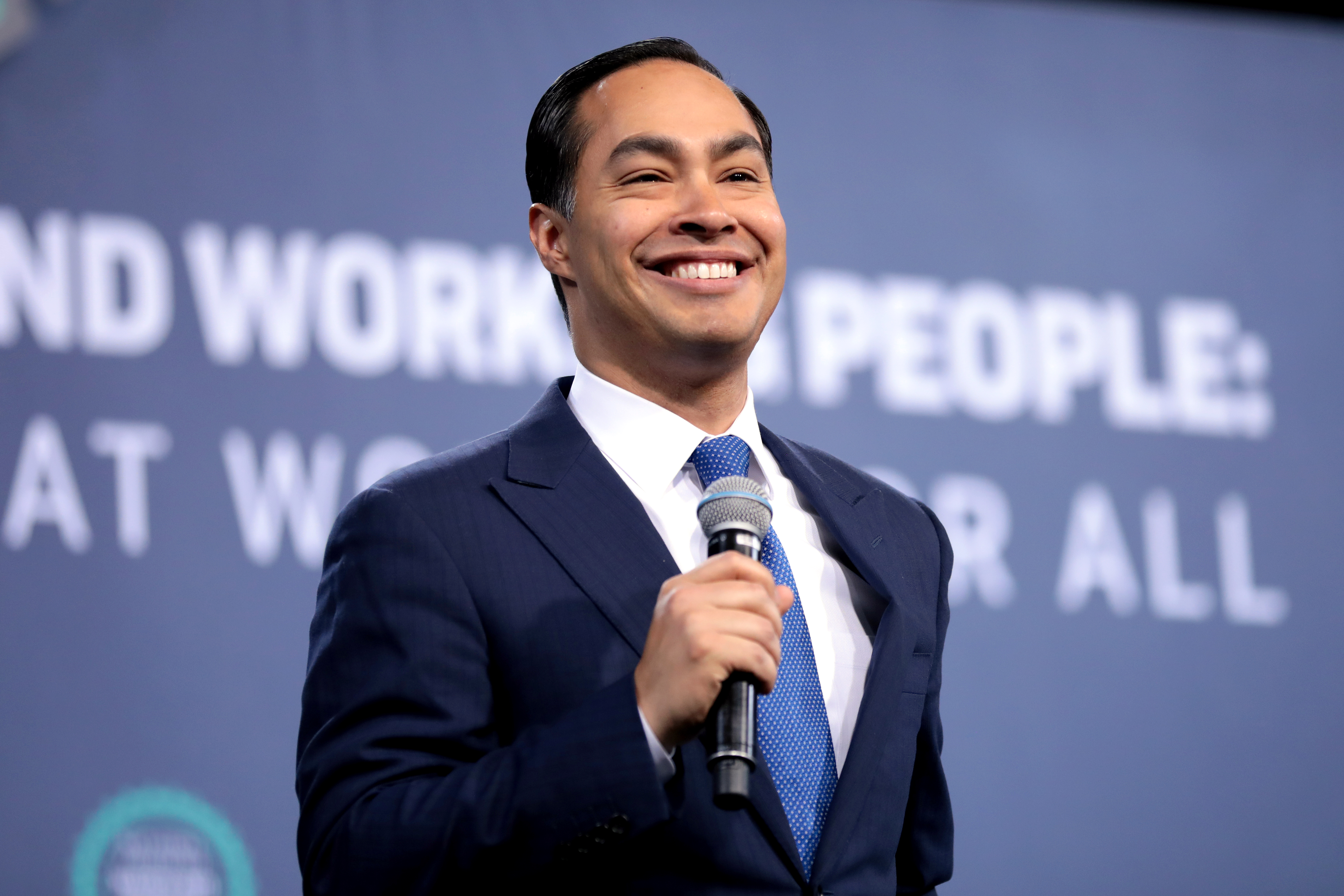
Former HUD Secretary Julian Castro suspended his campaign on January 2, 2020, and subsequently endorsed Elizabeth Warren.

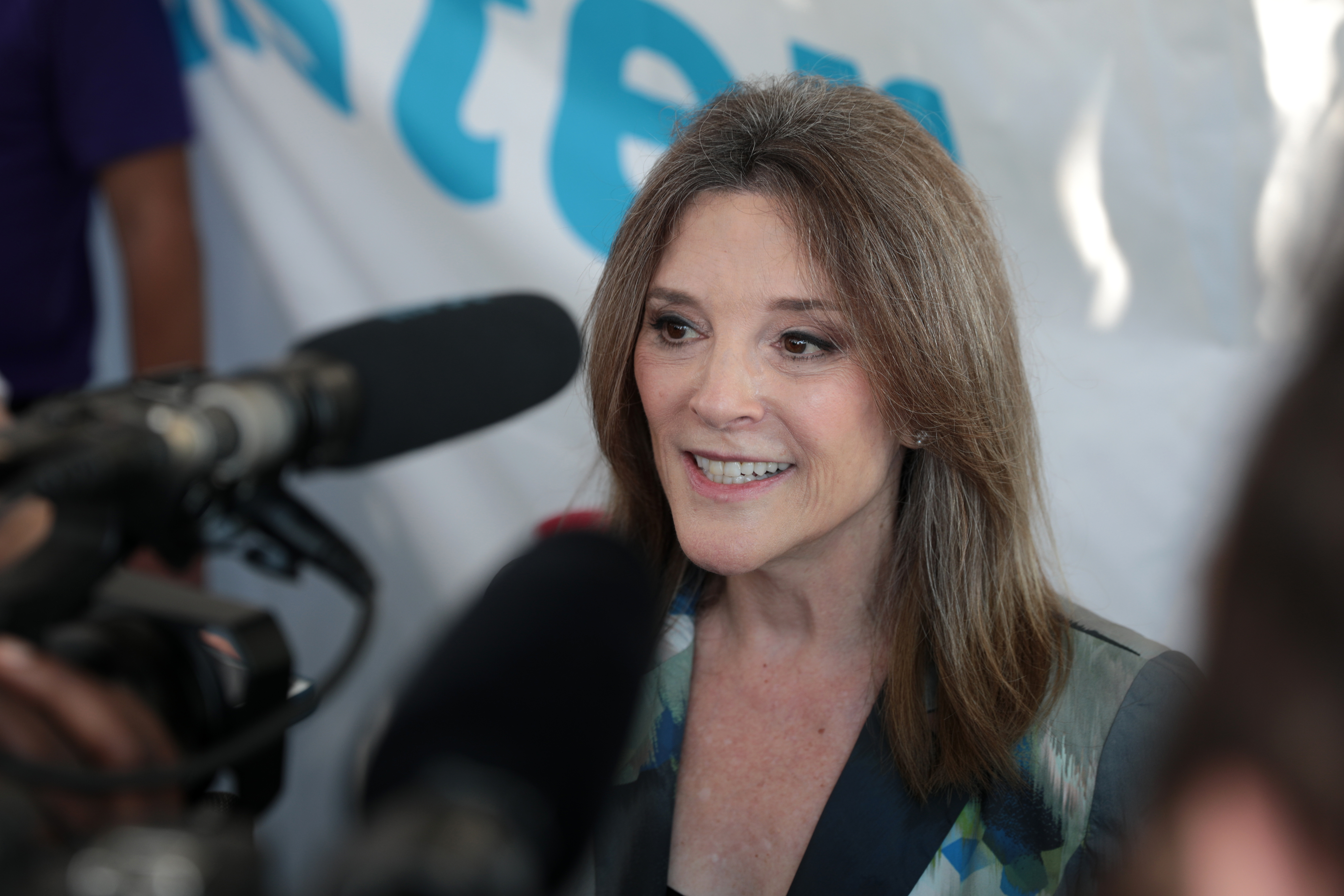
Spiritual author Marianne Williamson suspended her campaign on January 10, 2020, and subsequently endorsed Bernie Sanders.

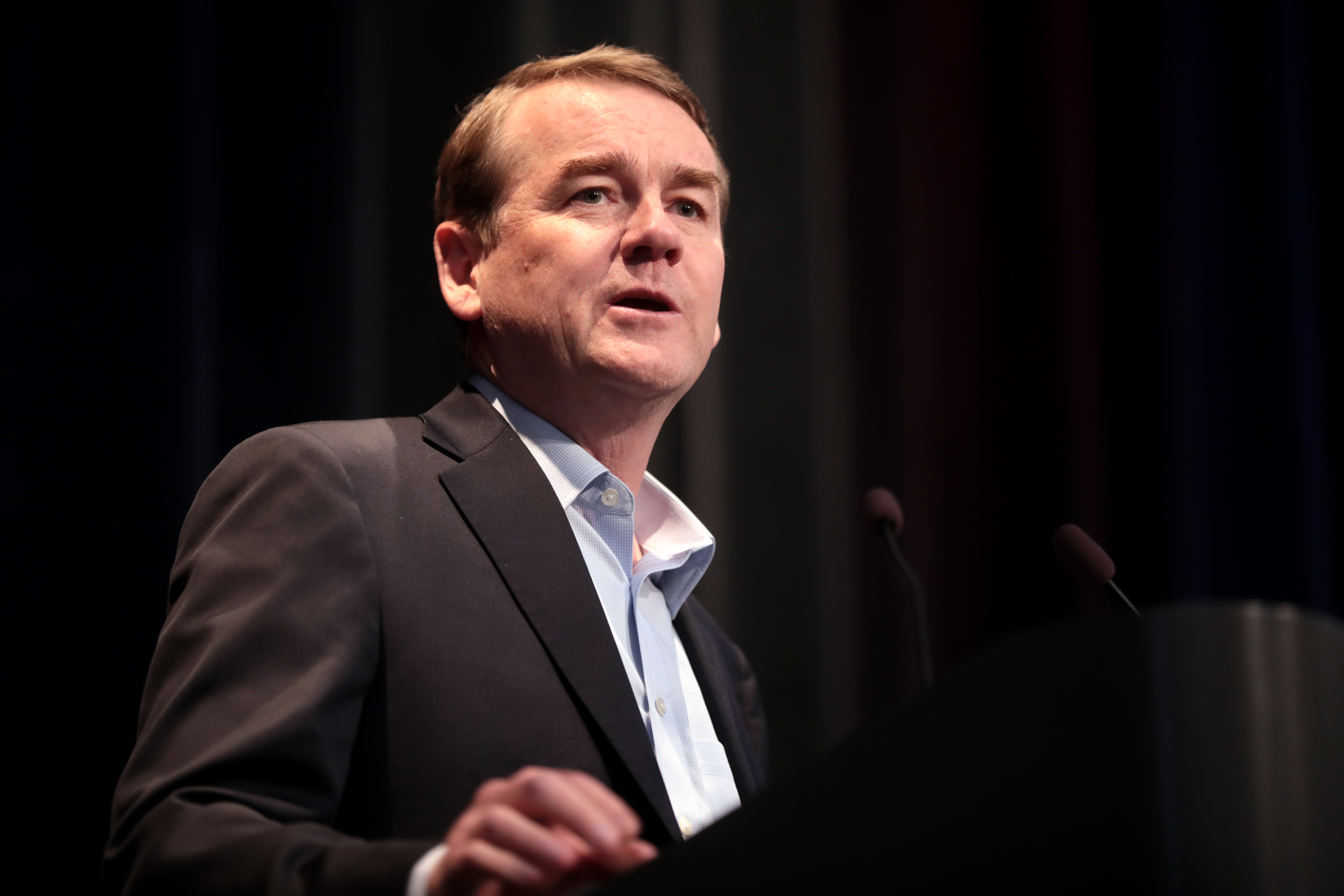
Sen. Michael Bennet suspended his campaign on February 11, 2020, after the polls closed in the New Hampshire primary.

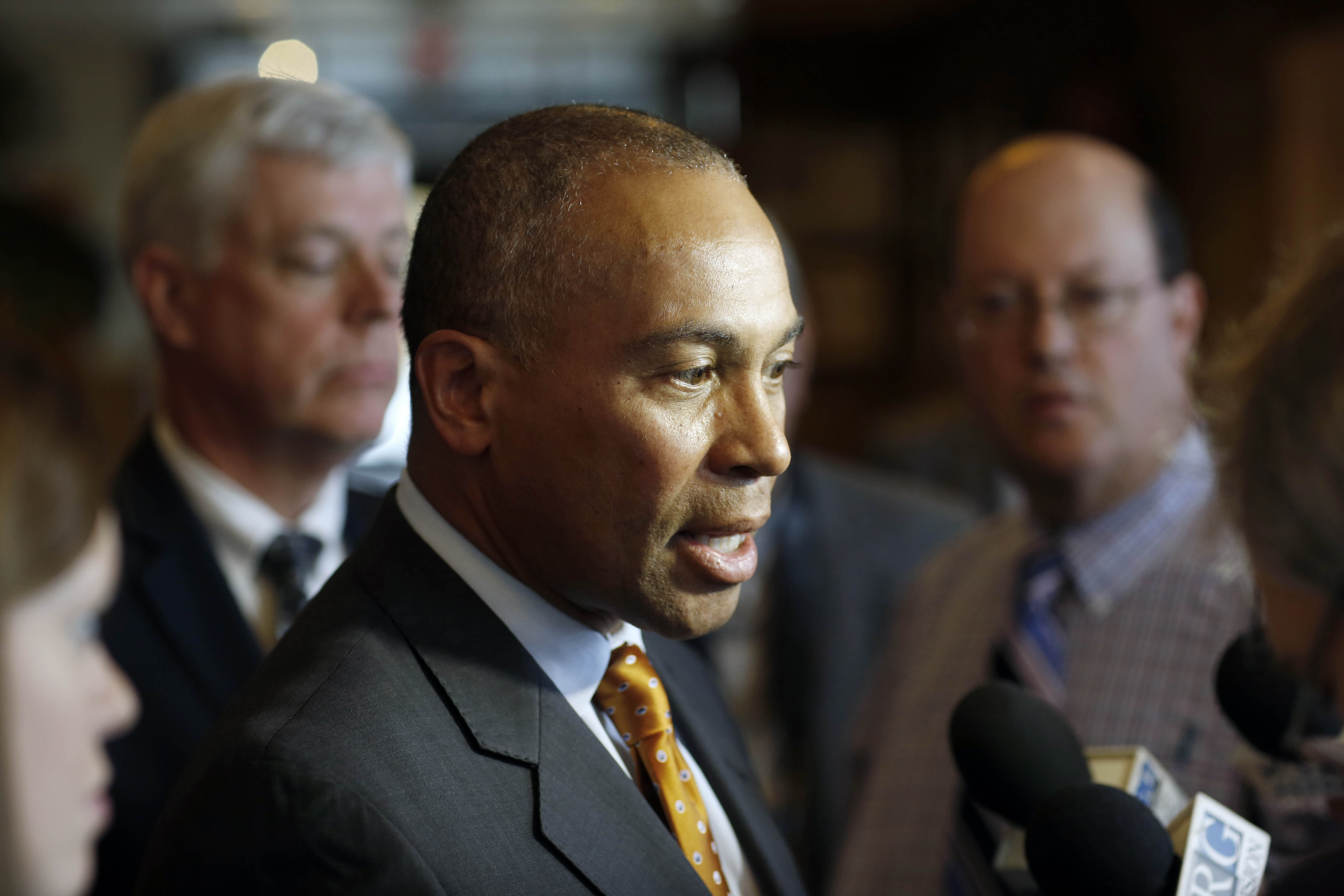
Former Governor Deval Patrick suspended his campaign on February 12, 2020, prior to the Nevada caucus.

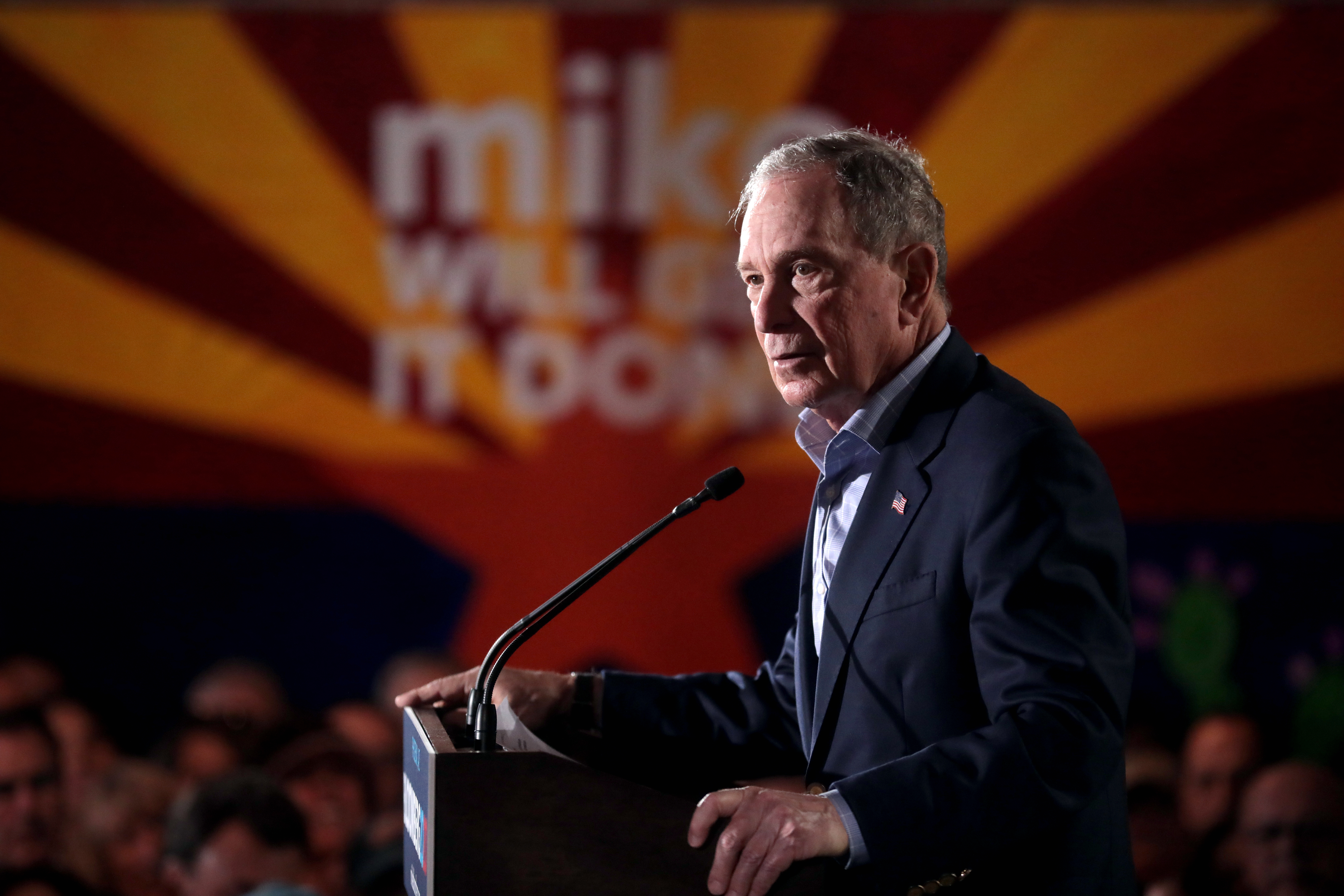
Former Mayor Michael Bloomberg suspended his campaign on March 4, 2020, after a distant third-place finish on Super Tuesday.

=== January 2019 ===
- January 11: U.S. Representative Tulsi Gabbard of Hawaii announced her candidacy during an interview on The Van Jones Show.
- January 12: Former United States Secretary of Housing and Urban Development Julian Castro officially announced his candidacy at a rally in San Antonio, Texas.
- January 15: Senator Kirsten Gillibrand of New York announced the formation of an exploratory committee during an interview on The Late Show with Stephen Colbert.
- January 21: Senator Kamala Harris of California announced her candidacy during an interview on Good Morning America.
- January 23: Mayor Pete Buttigieg of South Bend, Indiana, formed an exploratory committee.
- January 25: Ojeda dropped out of the race.
- January 28: Author, activist, and spiritual leader Marianne Williamson announced her candidacy at a rally in Los Angeles, California.

=== February 2019 ===
- February 1: Senator Cory Booker of New Jersey announced his candidacy.
- February 9: Warren formally announced her candidacy at a rally in Lawrence, Massachusetts.
- February 10: Senator Amy Klobuchar of Minnesota announced her candidacy at a rally in Minneapolis, Minnesota.
- February 19: Senator Bernie Sanders of Vermont announced his candidacy via an email to supporters and appeared on Vermont Public Radio as well as CBS This Morning as part of his campaign launch.

=== March 2019 ===
- March 1: Governor Jay Inslee of Washington announced his candidacy.
- March 4: Former governor John Hickenlooper of Colorado announced his candidacy.
- March 11: The DNC announced Milwaukee, Wisconsin, as the site of the 2020 Democratic National Convention.
- March 13: Mayor Wayne Messam of Miramar, Florida, formed an exploratory committee.
- March 14: Former Representative Beto O'Rourke of Texas announced his candidacy.
- March 17: Gillibrand formally announced her candidacy via an online video.
- March 19: An exploratory committee was formed on behalf of former Senator Mike Gravel of Alaska.
- March 28: Messam formally announced his candidacy in an online video.

=== April 2019 ===
- April 1: The We the People Membership Summit was held in Warner Theatre, Washington, D.C. by the Center for Popular Democracy Action, Communications Workers of America, Planned Parenthood Action Fund, Service Employees International Union, SEIU 32BJ, Sierra Club. Issues like democracy reform were discussed.
- April 4: Representative Tim Ryan of Ohio announced his candidacy and appeared on The View as part of a campaign launch.
- April 8:
  - Gravel formally announced his candidacy in an online video.
  - Representative Eric Swalwell of California announced his candidacy during an interview on The Late Show with Stephen Colbert.
- April 14: Pete Buttigieg announced his candidacy at a rally in South Bend, Indiana.
- April 22: Representative Seth Moulton of Massachusetts announced his candidacy in an online video.
- April 24: The She the People Presidential Forum was held at Texas Southern University, Houston, Texas by She the People. Issues affecting women of color were discussed.
- April 25: Former Vice President Joe Biden of Delaware announced his candidacy in an online video
- April 27: The National Forum on Wages and Working People: Creating an Economy that Works for All was held at Enclave, Las Vegas, Nevada by the Service Employees International Union and the Center for American Progress Action Fund. Economic issues affecting low-income Americans were discussed.

=== May 2019 ===
- May 2: Senator Michael Bennet of Colorado announced his candidacy during an interview on CBS This Morning.
- May 14: Governor Steve Bullock of Montana announced his candidacy in an online video.
- May 16: Mayor Bill de Blasio of New York City announced his candidacy in an online video and appeared on Good Morning America as part of a campaign launch.

=== June 2019 ===
- June 1: The Big Ideas Forum was held at Warfield Theatre, San Francisco, California by MoveOn. Ideas that could inspire voters and transform the country were discussed.
- May 31 – June 2: The California State Democratic Convention, a major "cattle call" event attended by most major candidates, took place in San Francisco.
- June 9: Iowa Democrats' Hall of Fame Dinner, a "cattle call" event featuring 19 candidates, took place at the DoubleTree Hilton Hotel and Convention Center in Cedar Rapids, IA.
- June 13: The Democratic National Committee announced that 20 candidates will participate in the first official debate on June 26–27.
- June 17: The Poor People's Campaign Presidential Forum was held at Trinity Washington University, Washington, D.C. by Poor People's Campaign. Issues affecting low-income Americans were discussed.
- June 21: The NALEO Presidential Candidate Forum was held at Telemundo Center, Miami, Florida by the NALEO. Issues affecting Hispanic and Latino Americans were discussed.
- June 22:
  - Former Representative Joe Sestak of Pennsylvania announced his candidacy with a midnight campaign website launch.
  - The South Carolina Democratic Party Convention was held at the Columbia Convention Center, Columbia, South Carolina by the South Carolina Democratic Party.
  - The We Decide: 2020 Election Membership Forum was held at the University of South Carolina, Columbia, South Carolina by the Planned Parenthood Action Fund. Reproductive health care and reproductive rights were discussed.
- June 26: The first part of the first Democratic debate took place in Miami, Florida at the Arsht Center.
- June 27: The second part of the first Democratic debate took place in Miami, Florida at the Arsht Center.

=== July 2019 ===
- July 5: The Strong Public Schools Presidential Forum was held at the George R. Brown Convention Center, Houston, Texas by the National Education Association. Issues affecting education and public schools were discussed.
- July 8: Swalwell dropped out of the race and announced he would run for reelection to his seat in the House of Representatives in 2020.
- July 9: Billionaire hedge fund manager Tom Steyer announced his candidacy in an online video.
- July 15–17, 19–20: The Iowa Presidential Candidate Forums were held in Des Moines, Davenport, Cedar Rapids, Sioux City, and Council Bluffs by AARP and The Des Moines Register. Issues affecting older voters in Iowa were discussed.
- July 24: The NAACP 2020 Presidential Candidates Forum was held in Detroit, Michigan.
- July 30: The first part of the second Democratic debate took place in Detroit, Michigan at the Fox Theatre.
- July 31: The second part of the second Democratic debate took place in Detroit, Michigan at the Fox Theatre.

=== August 2019 ===
- August 3: The Public Service Forum was held at the University of Nevada, Las Vegas, by AFSCME and the HuffPost. Public service, trade unions, labor rights, and the economy were discussed.
- August 6: Gravel dropped out of the race.
- August 10: The Gun Sense Forum was held in Des Moines, Iowa by Everytown for Gun Safety and Moms Demand Action. Gun violence was discussed.
- August 15: Hickenlooper dropped out of the race, later announcing a campaign for Colorado's Class 2 United States Senate seat up for election in 2020.
- August 8–11, 13, 17: The Des Moines Register Political Soapbox was held at the Iowa State Fair, Des Moines, Iowa by the Des Moines Register. Attending candidates provided 20-minute speeches on their political platforms.
- August 19–20: The Frank LaMere Native American Presidential Forum was held at Orpheum Theater, Sioux City, Iowa by Four Directions, Native Organizers Alliance, National Congress of American Indians, Native American Rights Fund, Coalition of Large Tribes, and Great Plains Tribal Chairmen's Association.
- August 21: Inslee dropped out of the race and announced a campaign for reelection as Governor of Washington in 2020.
- August 23: Moulton dropped out of the race and announced he would run for reelection to his seat in the House of Representatives in 2020.
- August 28: Gillibrand dropped out of the race.

=== September 2019 ===
- September 4: A Climate Crisis Town Hall was held by CNN at New York City, New York. Global warming was discussed.
- September 7: The New Hampshire Democratic Party State Convention was held at Southern New Hampshire University Arena in Manchester, New Hampshire. Nineteen candidates were in attendance and addressed the delegates and voters.
- September 12: The third Democratic debate took place in Houston, Texas at Texas Southern University.
- September 17: The Workers' Presidential Summit was held at the Pennsylvania Convention Center in Philadelphia, PA by the Philadelphia Council AFL–CIO. Issues affecting labor unions and union workers were discussed.
- September 19–20: A Climate Forum was held at Gaston Hall, Georgetown University in Washington, D.C., sponsored by MSNBC, Georgetown University, and Our Daily Planet.
- September 20:
  - De Blasio dropped out of the race.
  - An LGBTQ forum was held in the Sinclair Auditorium at Coe College in Cedar Rapids, IA by One Iowa, The Advocate, and GLAAD. LGBTQ rights were discussed.
- September 21: The Iowa People's Presidential Forum was held at the Iowa Events Centre in Des Moines, Iowa by Iowa Citizens for Community Improvement Action Fund and People's Action. Healthcare, green energy and education were discussed.
- September 22: A Youth Forum was held in Des Moines, Iowa by Des Moines Public Schools and the Des Moines Register. Students and youth issues were discussed.

=== October 2019 ===
- October 2: A Gun Safety Forum was held in Las Vegas, Nevada, by Giffords and March for Our Lives. Gun violence was discussed.
- October 10: An LGBTQ Forum was held at The Novo in Los Angeles, California by the Human Rights Campaign and UCLA. LGBTQ rights were discussed.
- October 15: The fourth Democratic debate took place in Westerville, Ohio at Otterbein University. The debate featured 12 candidates, setting a record for the highest number of candidates in one presidential debate.
- October 24: Ryan dropped out of the race and announced he would run for reelection to his seat in the House of Representatives in 2020.
- October 26–27: The Collegiate Bipartisan Presidential forum was held at Benedict College in Columbia, SC by Mayor Steve Benjamin and Benedict College. Students' interests, criminal justice reform and racial justice were discussed.

=== November 2019 ===
- November 1:
  - O'Rourke dropped out of the race.
  - The Liberty and Justice Celebration was held at Wells Fargo Arena in Des Moines, IA by the Iowa Democratic Party. Candidates performed 12-minute speeches covering their political platforms.
- November 8: Former New York City Mayor Michael Bloomberg prepared to enter the race by filing for ballot access in Alabama.
- November 14: Former Governor of Massachusetts Deval Patrick announced his candidacy.
- November 16: The California Democratic Party Fall Endorsing Convention Forum was held at Long Beach Arena, Long Beach, California by the California Democratic Party/Univision. Latino issues were discussed.
- November 17: The Nevada State Democratic Party's First In The West "cattle call" event was held at the Bellagio Hotel in Las Vegas, NV.
- November 19: Messam dropped out of the race.
- November 20: The fifth Democratic debate took place in Atlanta, Georgia at Tyler Perry Studios.
- November 21: Bloomberg formed an exploratory committee.
- November 24: Bloomberg announced his candidacy with a website launch.

=== December 2019 ===
- December 1: Sestak dropped out of the race.
- December 2: Bullock dropped out of the race.
- December 3: Harris dropped out of the race.
- December 7: The Teamsters Union Forum was held by the International Brotherhood of Teamsters, the Storm Lake Times and The Guardian at the Veteran's Auditorium in Cedar Rapids, IA. Workers' rights and the Teamsters three-point pledge were discussed.
- December 14: The Public Education Forum 2020 was held at the David L. Lawrence Convention Center in Pittsburgh, PA by the American Federation of Teachers, the National Educational Association and the Alliance to Reclaim Our Schools. Education was discussed.
- December 19: The sixth Democratic debate took place in Los Angeles, California, at Loyola Marymount University.

== 2020 ==
=== January 2020 ===
- January 2: Castro dropped out of the race.
- January 6: Castro endorsed Warren.
- January 10: Williamson dropped out of the race.
- January 13: Booker dropped out of the race.
- January 14: The seventh Democratic debate took place in Des Moines, Iowa at Drake University.
- January 17: Voting in the Minnesota primary began.
- January 31: Delaney dropped out of the race.

=== February 2020 ===
- February 3–7: The Iowa caucuses took place, but inconsistencies reported in the caucus results delayed reporting of the outcome. Results were released that showed Buttigieg leading in-state delegate equivalents and Sanders winning a plurality of first-alignment and final-alignment votes. The reporting delays, errors, and inconsistencies surrounding the caucuses prompted DNC Chairman Tom Perez and both campaigns to call for a recanvass.
- February 7: The eighth Democratic debate took place in Goffstown, New Hampshire at St. Anselm College.
- February 11:
  - Sanders won New Hampshire with 26% of the vote, but Buttigieg, who came in second with 24%, received the same number of delegates (9).
  - Bennet dropped out of the race.
  - Yang dropped out of the race.
- February 12: Patrick dropped out of the race.
- February 14: De Blasio endorsed Sanders.
- February 15–17: The Moving America Forward Infrastructure Forum was held at University of Nevada, Las Vegas, by the IUOE, ASCE, TWUA, ARTBA, APTA, AEM, and other groups. Infrastructure policy was discussed, with a focus on transportation, water, and broadband issues.
- February 19: The ninth Democratic debate took place in Las Vegas, Nevada at Le Théâtre des Arts in the Paris Las Vegas.
- February 21: Voting in the Washington primary began.
- February 22: Sanders won Nevada.
- February 23: Williamson endorsed Sanders.
- February 24: Voting in the Colorado primary began.
- February 25: The tenth Democratic debate took place in Charleston, South Carolina at the Gaillard Center.
- February 26: House Majority Whip Jim Clyburn endorses Biden ahead of the South Carolina primary.
- February 27: Buttigieg won Iowa. Following several recounts and a recanvass, Buttigieg retained his lead in state delegate equivalents, and the Iowa Democratic Party declared him the official winner, making him the first openly gay candidate of a major political party to win a presidential primary. Sanders won a plurality of first-alignment and final-alignment votes.
- February 29:
  - Biden won South Carolina.
  - Steyer dropped out of the race.

=== March 2020 ===
- March 1: Buttigieg dropped out of the race.
- March 2:
  - Klobuchar dropped out of the race.
  - Buttigieg, Klobuchar, and O'Rourke endorsed Biden during an evening rally in Texas.
- March 3:
  - Super Tuesday was held.
  - Biden won Alabama, Arkansas, Massachusetts, Maine, Minnesota, North Carolina, Oklahoma, Tennessee, Texas, and Virginia.
  - Bloomberg won American Samoa.
  - Sanders won California, Colorado, Utah, and Vermont.
  - Voting in the Democrats Abroad primary began.
- March 4: Bloomberg dropped out of the race and endorsed Biden.
- March 5: Warren dropped out of the race.
- March 6: Delaney endorsed Biden.
- March 8: Harris endorsed Biden.
- March 9: Booker endorsed Biden.
- March 10:
  - Biden won Idaho, Michigan, Mississippi, Missouri, and Washington.
  - Sanders won North Dakota.
  - Yang endorsed Biden.
- March 13:
  - A national emergency was declared due to the coronavirus pandemic. Several presidential primaries were soon rescheduled, and candidates limited in-person events.
  - The Louisiana primary was rescheduled from April 4 to June 20 due to coronavirus concerns.
- March 14:
  - Sanders won Northern Mariana Islands.
  - The Georgia primary was rescheduled from March 24 to May 19 due to coronavirus concerns.
- March 15: The eleventh Democratic debate, originally scheduled to take place in Phoenix, Arizona at Arizona Federal Theatre, took place in Washington, D.C. at the CNN studio due to coronavirus concerns.
- March 16:
  - The Kentucky primary was rescheduled from May 19 to June 23 due to coronavirus concerns.
  - Ohio announced that it intended to postpone its primary, a plan a judge struck down the same day. Following the judge's decision, Ohio Governor Mike DeWine announced that polls would be closed by order of Ohio Health Director Amy Acton due to a "health emergency." State officials sought to extend the voting process.
- March 17:
  - Biden won Arizona, Florida, and Illinois.
  - The Ohio primary was postponed as DeWine requested when the Ohio Supreme Court denied the challenge to the state.
  - The Maryland primary was rescheduled from April 28 to June 2 due to coronavirus concerns.
- March 19:
  - Gabbard dropped out of the race and endorsed Biden.
  - The Connecticut primary was rescheduled from April 28 to June 2 due to coronavirus concerns.
- March 20: The Indiana primary was rescheduled from May 5 to June 2 due to coronavirus concerns.
- March 21: The Puerto Rico primary was rescheduled from March 29 to April 26 due to coronavirus concerns.
- March 22: The Wyoming caucuses were rescheduled from April 4 to an all-mail caucus with voting through April 17 due to coronavirus concerns.
- March 23:
  - Sanders won Democrats Abroad.
  - The Rhode Island primary was rescheduled from April 28 to June 2 due to coronavirus concerns.
  - The Alaska primary was rescheduled from April 4 to an all-mail primary with voting through April 10 due to coronavirus concerns.
- March 24: The Delaware primary was rescheduled from April 28 to June 2 due to coronavirus concerns.
- March 25: The Ohio primary was rescheduled as an all-mail primary with voting through April 28 due to coronavirus concerns.
- March 27:
  - The Pennsylvania primary was rescheduled from April 28 to June 2 due to coronavirus concerns.
  - The Hawaii primary was rescheduled from April 4 to an all-mail primary with voting through May 22 due to coronavirus concerns.
- March 28: The New York primary was rescheduled from April 28 to June 23 due to coronavirus concerns.
- March 30: The Kansas primary was rescheduled from May 2 to an all-mail primary with voting through April 24 due to coronavirus concerns.

=== April 2020 ===
- April 1: The West Virginia primary was rescheduled from May 12 to June 9 due to coronavirus concerns.
- April 2: The Puerto Rico primary was postponed with no rescheduled date due to coronavirus concerns.
- April 7: Voting in the Wisconsin primary took place with the results delayed until April 13 in accordance with a district court ruling.
- April 8:
  - Sanders suspended his campaign, and Biden became the presumptive presidential nominee.
  - The New Jersey primary was rescheduled from June 2 to July 7 due to coronavirus concerns.
- April 9: The Georgia primary was rescheduled from May 19 to June 9 due to coronavirus concerns.
- April 10: The mail-in voting period ended for the Alaska primary.
- April 11: Biden won Alaska.
- April 13:
  - Sanders endorsed Biden.
  - Biden won Wisconsin.
- April 14:
  - Former President Barack Obama endorsed Biden.
  - The Louisiana primary was rescheduled from June 20 to July 11 due to coronavirus concerns.
- April 15: Warren endorsed Biden.
- April 17:
  - The mail-in voting period ended for the Wyoming caucuses.
  - The Connecticut primary was rescheduled from June 2 to August 11 due to coronavirus concerns.
- April 19: Biden won Wyoming.
- April 22: Inslee endorsed Biden.
- April 24: The mail-in voting period ended for the Kansas primary.
- April 27:
  - Speaker of the House Nancy Pelosi endorsed Biden.
  - The New York State Board of Elections canceled its primary. Democratic Chairman Jay Jacobs said it was unknown how New York would count delegates to the Democratic Convention.
- April 28:
  - The mail-in voting period ended for the Ohio primary.
  - Yang sued the New York State Board of Elections over its decision to cancel the New York primary.
  - Hillary Clinton endorsed Biden.
  - Biden won Ohio.
- April 29: Voting in the Oregon primary began.
- April 30: Biden announced his vice-presidential selection committee.

=== May 2020 ===
- May 2: Biden won Kansas.
- May 4: Oral arguments were held in the New York primary cancellation suit.
- May 5:
  - A federal judge ruled that the New York primary must proceed on June 23 as previously scheduled.
  - The Guam caucuses were postponed due to coronavirus concerns.
- May 7: The Delaware primary was rescheduled from June 2 to July 7 due to coronavirus concerns.
- May 12: Biden won Nebraska.
- May 17: The New York State Board of Elections appealed the federal judge's decision to the 2nd Circuit Court of Appeals.
- May 19:
  - The New York State Board of Elections lost the appeal and did not appeal further. The New York primary would proceed on June 23 as previously scheduled.
  - Biden won Oregon.
- May 21: The Puerto Rico primary was rescheduled for July 12 due to coronavirus concerns.
- May 22:
  - The mail-in voting period ended for the Hawaii primary.
  - Biden won Hawaii.
- May 23: The Guam caucuses were rescheduled for June 6 due to coronavirus concerns.

=== June 2020 ===
- June 2: Biden won the District of Columbia, Indiana, Maryland, Montana, New Mexico, Pennsylvania, Rhode Island, and South Dakota.
- June 5: As votes continued to be counted in the June 2 races, the Associated Press estimated that Biden had passed the 1,991 delegate threshold to secure the nomination.
- June 6
  - Biden won Guam.
  - Biden officially passed the 1,991-delegate threshold to secure the nomination.
- June 8: Biden won the U.S. Virgin Islands.
- June 9: Biden won Georgia and West Virginia.
- June 23: Biden won New York and Kentucky.

=== July 2020 ===
- July 7: Biden won Delaware and New Jersey.
- July 11: Biden won Louisiana.
- July 12: Biden won Puerto Rico.

=== August 2020 ===
- August 11:
  - Biden announced U.S. Senator Kamala Harris as his vice-presidential running mate.
  - Biden won Connecticut.
- August 17–20: The Democratic National Convention was held. Delegates nominated Biden for president and Harris for vice president in the 2020 United States presidential election.

== Timeline ==
Nominee
Exploratory committee
Suspended campaign
Midterm elections
Iowa caucuses
New Hampshire primary
South Carolina primary
Super; Tuesday
National emergency declared due to coronavirus
Wisconsin primary
Democratic convention
Won election
