= 2020 Louisiana Democratic presidential primary =

- July 11, 2020

60 delegates (54 pledged, 6 unpledged) to the Democratic National Convention

Candidate	Joe Biden	Bernie Sanders (withdrawn)
Home state	Delaware	Vermont
Delegate count	54	0
Popular vote	212,555	19,859
Percentage	79.52%	7.43%
Biden
40–50%
50–60%
60–70%
70–80%
80–90%
Biden
<30%
30–40%
40–50%
50–60%
60–70%
70–80%
80–90%
90–100%
Sanders
20-30%
30–40%
40–50%
50–60%
60–70%
90–100%
Warren
20-30%
30–40%
50–60%
60–70%
90–100%
Bennet
20-30%
30–40%
40–50%
50–60%
60–70%
70–80%
90–100%
Yang
20-30%
30–40%
40–50%
50–60%
70–80%
90–100%
Bloomberg
20-30%
30–40%
40–50%
50–60%
60–70%
70–80%
90–100%
Klobuchar
20-30%
30–40%
40–50%
60–70%
90–100%
Buttigieg
<30%
40–50%
50–60%
60–70%
90–100%
Gabbard
20-30%
30–40%
40–50%
50–60%
60–70%
Delaney
30–40%
60–70%
90–100%
Steyer
20-30%
30–40%
90–100%
Patrick
50–60%
60–70%
Burke
30–40%
50–60%
90–100%
Wells
20-30%
30–40%
90–100%
Other
20–30% tie
30–40% tie
40–50% tie
50% tie
No votes

Pledged national convention delegates
Type	Del.
CD1	4
CD2	9
CD3	5
CD4	6
CD5	6
CD6	5
PLEO	7
At-large	12
Total pledged delegates	54

The 2020 Louisiana Democratic presidential primary took place on July 11, 2020, a Saturday, in the Democratic Party primaries for the 2020 presidential election. It was originally planned for April 4 together with three other primaries, but was moved twice due to the COVID-19 pandemic. The Louisiana primary was a closed primary, with the state awarding 60 delegates, of which 54 were pledged delegates allocated on the basis of the results of the primary.

Presumptive nominee and former vice president Joe Biden won nearly 80% of the vote and all delegates, while senator Bernie Sanders only took little more than 7% and 12 other mainly withdrawn candidates that had formally remained on the ballot made up the rest.

== Procedure ==
Louisiana was initially planned to be one of four states holding primaries on Saturday, April 4, 2020, the other three being Alaska, Hawaii and Wyoming. On June 20, 2019, governor John Bel Edwards had signed a bill consolidating the presidential primary with municipal and ward elections on the same date, shifting the primary date from the first Saturday in March to the first Saturday in April.

On March 13, 2020, secretary of state Kyle Ardoin chose to postpone the state's primaries until June 20 due to the COVID-19 pandemic. On April 14, the primary was further delayed another three weeks to July 11. These delays would have resulted in Louisiana losing half of its delegates, as the primary date was "past a June 9 deadline set by the Democratic National Committee", but there was no penalty as the 2020 Democratic National Convention was rescheduled to August.

Voting was expected to take place throughout the state from 6:00 a.m. until 8:00 p.m. In the closed primary, candidates had to meet a threshold of 15 percent at the congressional district or statewide level in order to be considered viable. The 54 pledged delegates to the 2020 Democratic National Convention were allocated proportionally on the basis of the results of the primary. Of these, between 3 and 8 were allocated to each of the state's 6 congressional districts, and another 7 were allocated to party leaders and elected officials (PLEO delegates), in addition to 12 at-large delegates. Originally planned with 50 delegates, the final number included a 10% bonus of 4 additional delegates on the 32 district and 11 at-large delegates by the Democratic National Committee.

Following the primary, district-level delegates were elected through post-primary congressional district caucuses featuring mail-in balloting. The Democratic state central committee then had to vote on the 12 at-large and 7 pledged PLEO delegates to send to the Democratic National Convention and also conducted this by mail until 8 June. The delegation also included 6 unpledged PLEO delegates: 4 members of the Democratic National Committee, a sole representative from Congress in Cedric Richmond, and the governor John Bel Edwards.

== Candidates ==
The following individuals appeared on the ballot:

Running

- Joe Biden
- Steve Burke
- Robby Wells

Withdrawn

- Michael Bennet
- Michael Bloomberg
- Pete Buttigieg
- John Delaney
- Tulsi Gabbard
- Amy Klobuchar
- Deval Patrick
- Bernie Sanders
- Tom Steyer
- Elizabeth Warren
- Andrew Yang

== Results ==
2020 Louisiana Democratic presidential primary
Candidate	Votes	%	Delegates
Joe Biden	212,555	79.52	54
Bernie Sanders (withdrawn)	19,859	7.43	
Elizabeth Warren (withdrawn)	6,426	2.40	
Michael Bennet (withdrawn)	6,173	2.31	
Andrew Yang (withdrawn)	4,617	1.73	
Michael Bloomberg (withdrawn)	4,312	1.61	
Amy Klobuchar (withdrawn)	2,431	0.91	
Pete Buttigieg (withdrawn)	2,363	0.88	
Tulsi Gabbard (withdrawn)	1,962	0.73	
John Delaney (withdrawn)	1,877	0.70	
Tom Steyer (withdrawn)	902	0.34	
Deval Patrick (withdrawn)	877	0.33	
Other candidates	2,932	1.10	
Total	267,286	100%	54

== See also ==
- Impact of the COVID-19 pandemic on politics
