= 2020 Connecticut Democratic presidential primary =

- August 11, 2020

75 delegates (60 pledged, 15 unpledged) to the Democratic National Convention

Candidate	Joe Biden	Bernie Sanders (withdrawn)
Home state	Delaware	Vermont
Delegate count	60	0
Popular vote	224,500	30,512
Percentage	84.90%	11.54%

Biden
70–80%
80–90%
>90%

The 2020 Connecticut Democratic presidential primary took place on August 11, 2020, as part of the Democratic Party primaries for the 2020 presidential election. It was originally to take place on April 28, 2020, as one of several northeastern states in the "Acela primary", but was rescheduled twice due to the COVID-19 pandemic. The state was the last one to hold a Democratic presidential contest long after the penultimate contest more than a month prior and had been pushed to only one week before the rescheduled 2020 Democratic National Convention. The Connecticut primary was a closed primary, with the state awarding 75 delegates to the national convention, of which 60 were pledged delegates allocated on the basis of the primary results.

Former vice president and presumptive nominee Joe Biden won the last primary with around 85%, and senator Bernie Sanders, seeking to win delegates until the end of the primaries, received little more than 11%. While the late timeframe combined with the early virtual-polling period for delegates of the national convention, which started prior to the national convention and ended on August 15, shortened the state party's window to calculate and select its delegates to a normally unrealistic amount of less than four days, the clear result for Biden meant that he would most certainly win all of the 60 delegates, which remained correct following the final certified results of the primary election in late August.

== Procedure ==
Connecticut originally joined several northeastern states, which are connected by the Acela train system, as part of a regional cluster, the "Acela primary", in holding primaries on April 28, 2020. Due to the COVID-19 pandemic, Governor Ned Lamont, consulting with secretary of state Denise Merrill, first moved the primary to June 2 in March, and in April decided to move it further to Connecticut's general state primary on August 11, the only state to do so that late.

Voting took place throughout the state from 6:00 a.m. until 8:00 p.m. In the closed primary, candidates had to meet a threshold of 15% at the congressional district or statewide level in order to be considered viable. The 60 pledged delegates to the 2020 Democratic National Convention were allocated proportionally on the basis of the results of the primary. Of these, 8 were allocated to each of the state's 5 congressional districts, and another 6 were allocated to party leaders and elected officials (PLEO delegates), in addition to 14 at-large delegates. Originally planned with 49 delegates, the final number included a 25% bonus of 11 additional delegates on the 32 district and 11 at-large delegates by the Democratic National Committee, 10% for the original April date, which belonged to Stage II on the primary timetable, and an additional 15% for the regional "Acela" cluster.

Following the primary, post-primary congressional district caucuses and the state party committee meeting in Hartford would have been held on May 27 and June 10 to vote on national convention delegates. Considering the polling timeframe for convention delegates to complete and submit their mail-in ballots for the national convention was less than four days following the primary, both events were held as pre-primary events. The potential district-level national convention delegates were elected through online district caucuses on June 30, and the potential 14 at-large and 6 pledged PLEO delegates were elected at an online state party committee meeting on July 8, both for Biden and Sanders each. The delegation also included 15 unpledged PLEO delegates: 6 members of the Democratic National Committee, 7 members of Congress (both senators and all 5 representatives), the governor Ned Lamont, and former DNC chair Chris Dodd.

== Rescheduling ==
In mid-April, the center of the pandemic was in New York and New England, and so Governor Ned Lamont postponed its presidential primary twice, first to late June, then to August 11 — the Tuesday before the Democrats' rescheduled national convention.

To make matters even more complex, Governor Lamont issued an executive order making absentee ballots available to all, meaning that delays in counting, which occurred in many states during the primary period, would last well after the convention was over.

Complicating things even more, in mid-July it was announced that balloting by the national convention delegates to select the presidential candidate as well as answer other questions would take place online, over a two-week-long period beginning August 3, six days before the primary was to start, and ending August 15, four days after the primary, giving the delegation a mere four days or more realistically less than that to be selected by the state party as per the primary results.

== Candidates ==
The following candidates were on the ballot in Connecticut:

- Joe Biden
- Tulsi Gabbard (withdrawn)
- Bernie Sanders (withdrawn)

Michael Bloomberg, Pete Buttigieg, Amy Klobuchar, Tom Steyer and Elizabeth Warren had withdrawn early enough so that they were taken off the ballot. The ballot also included an "uncommitted" option.

== Polling ==
Poll source	Date(s) administered	Sample size (Note: Key: A – all adults RV – registered voters LV – likely voters V – unclear)	Margin of error	Joe Biden	Bernie Sanders	Pete Buttigieg	Elizabeth Warren	Other	Undecided
	Apr 8, 2020	Sanders suspends his campaign							
GreatBlue Research/Sacred Heart University/Hartford Courant	Mar 24–Apr 3, 2020	– (RV) (Note: Not specified in release.)	–	52.0%	32.5%	–	–	1.4% (Note: Other with 1.4%)	14.1%
GreatBlue Research/Sacred Heart University/Hartford Courant	Feb 24–Mar 12, 2020	383 (RV)	–	42.1%	24.5%	–	–	19.5% (Note: Other with 19.5%)	13.8%
	Mar 5, 2020	Warren withdraws from the race							
	Mar 1, 2020	Buttigieg withdraws from the race							
GreatBlue Research/Sacred Heart University/Hartford Courant	Dec 16, 2019–Jan 2, 2020	348 (RV)	–	33.0%	19.3%	11.2%	17.8%	3.4% (Note: Other with 3.4%)	15.2%

== Results ==
2020 Connecticut Democratic presidential primary
Candidate	Votes	%	Delegates
Joe Biden	224,500	84.90	60
Bernie Sanders (withdrawn)	30,512	11.54	
Tulsi Gabbard (withdrawn)	3,429	1.30	
Uncommitted	5,975	2.26	
Total	264,416	100%	60

=== Results by county ===
County	Biden	Gabbard	Sanders	Uncommitted
Fairfield	87.33%	0.98%	9.87%	1.82%
Hartford	85.69%	1.36%	10.72%	2.23%
Litchfield	83.06%	1.37%	13.11%	2.46%
Middlesex	83.41%	1.37%	13.17%	2.05%
New Haven	83.64%	1.41%	12.36%	2.60%
New London	82.98%	1.47%	13.05%	2.50%
Tolland	82.50%	1.39%	13.96%	2.16%
Windham	80.45%	1.83%	14.31%	3.42%
TOTAL	84.90%	1.30%	11.54%	2.26%
Source: https://uselectionatlas.org/RESULTS/state.php?fips=9&year=2020&f=0&off=0&elect=1
