= 2016 Arizona presidential primary =

The 2016 Arizona primary took place on March 22, 2016, as part of the nominating process for the 2016 United States presidential election. Primaries were held at the same time for the Democratic Party, the Republican Party, and the Green Party. The Arizona primary was a closed primary, meaning that only voters registered with one of three parties were allowed to vote. Hillary Clinton was declared the winner on the Democratic side, Donald Trump won on the Republican side, and the Green party chose Jill Stein as their candidate. Arizona does not have presidential primaries. Arizona has presidential preference elections. Arizona state primaries are open, while Arizona preference elections are closed.

== Statewide results ==
United States presidential primary election in Arizona, 2016
Party	Candidate	Votes	Percentage	Delegates
Democratic	Hillary Clinton	242,064	57%	44
Democratic	Bernie Sanders	169,156	40%	30
Republican	Donald Trump	258,384	47%	58
Republican	Ted Cruz	142,694	26%	0
Republican	John Kasich	53,040	10%	0
Green	Jill Stein	630	81%	0
Green	Kent Mesplay	144	19%	0

== Controversy and allegations of voter suppression and electoral fraud ==
There was controversy surrounding the Arizona primary elections of 2016, specifically having to do with the dramatic decrease in polling places from 200 in 2012 to only 60 in 2016, despite the number of registered voters having increased from 300,000 in 2012 to 800,000 in 2016. This decrease in polling places was most pronounced in minority neighborhoods, most notably Latino neighborhoods, with areas like Central Phoenix having only one polling place for 108,000 voters. There were also reports of voters who had been previously registered coming up as unregistered or registered as an independent, making them ineligible to vote. Voters who did manage to vote had to stand in long lines to cast their ballots, some for as long as 5 hours.

This was the first election in the state of Arizona since the 2013 Supreme Court decision to strike down Section 5 of the Voting Rights Act of 1965, which would have previously required states with a history of voter discrimination, including Arizona, to receive Federal approval before implementing any changes to voting laws and practices.

As a result of the controversy surrounding the Arizona primary, Phoenix mayor Greg Stanton asked the Justice Department to launch an investigation into the allegations of voter suppression.

== See also ==
- Voter suppression
- Electoral fraud
