= 2020 Arizona Democratic presidential primary =

- March 17, 2020

80 delegates (67 pledged, 13 unpledged) to the Democratic National Convention The number of pledged delegates won is determined by the popular vote

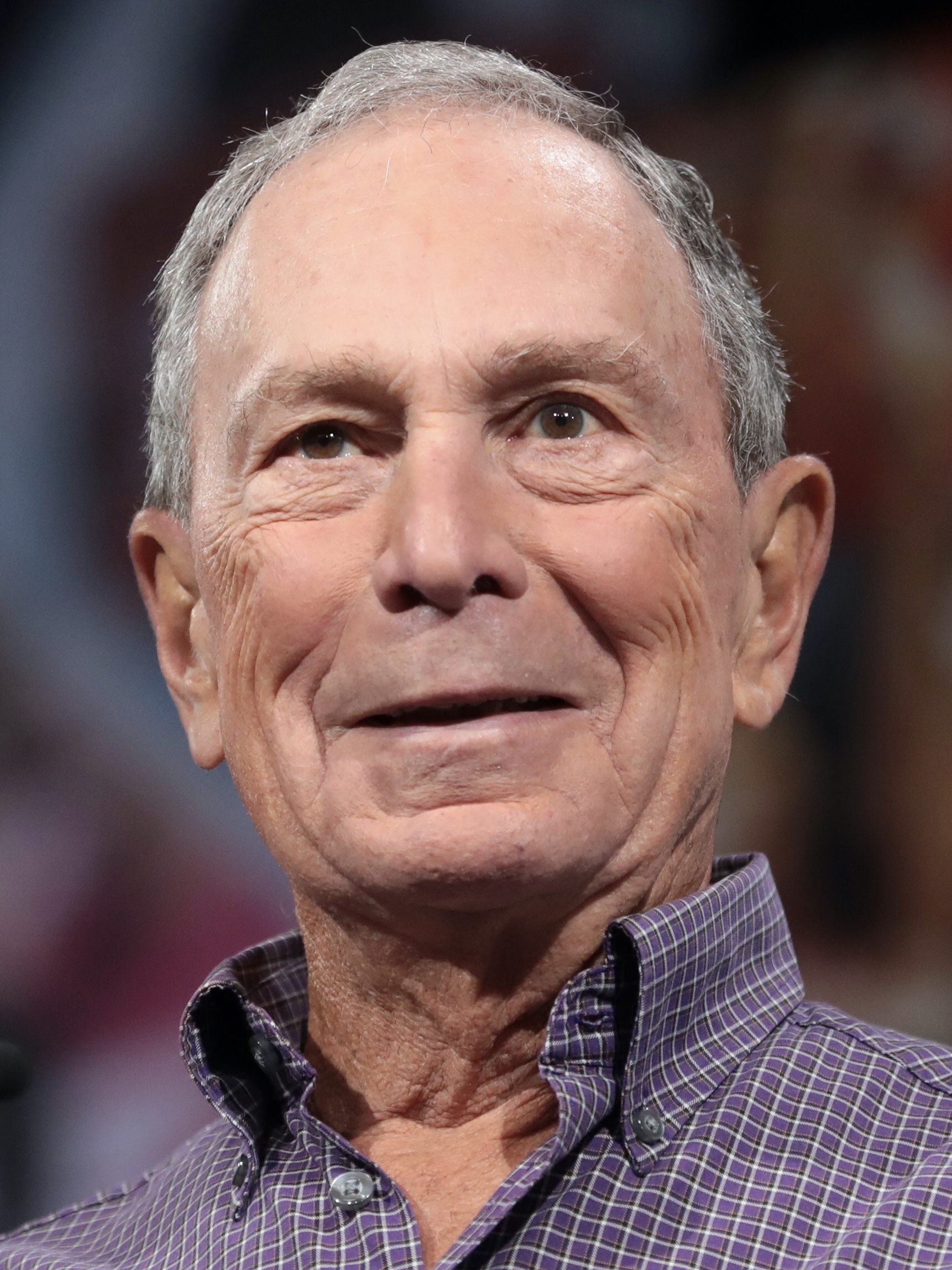

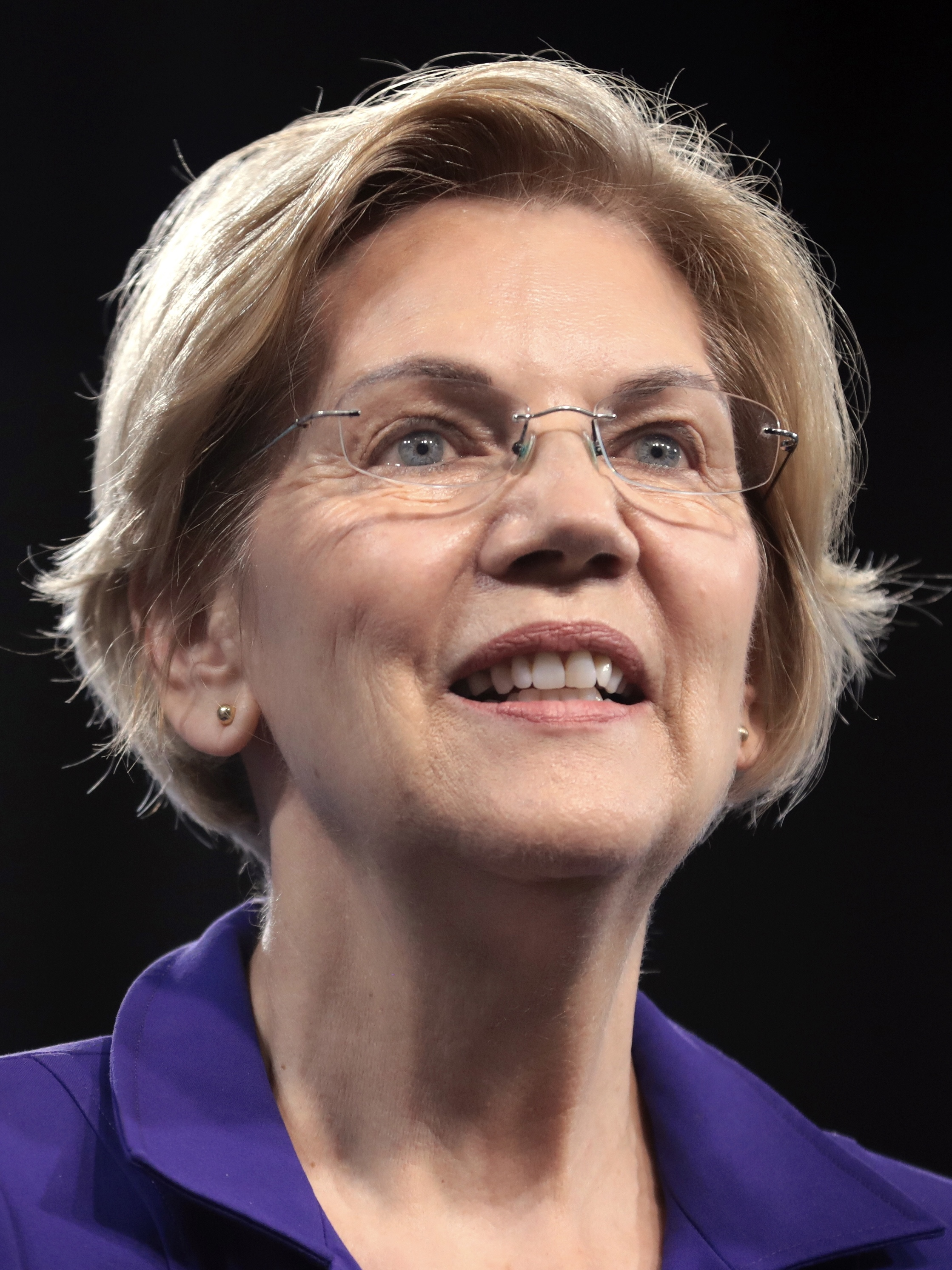
Candidate	Joe Biden	Bernie Sanders
Home state	Delaware	Vermont
Delegate count	38	29
Popular vote	268,029	200,456
Percentage	43.70%	32.70%
Candidate	Michael Bloomberg (withdrawn) (Note: Bloomberg publicly withdrew on March 4, 2020, thirteen days before the primary, and later also officially withdrew in the state, but absentee and early voting had already occurred and he was not taken off the ballot.)	Elizabeth Warren (withdrawn) (Note: Warren withdrew on March 5, 2020, twelve days before the primary. Absentee and early voting had already occurred.)
Home state	New York	Massachusetts
Delegate count	0	0
Popular vote	58,797	35,537
Percentage	9.59%	5.79%
Election results by county
Joe Biden	Bernie Sanders

Pledged national convention delegates
Type	Del.
CD1	5
CD2	6
CD3	5
CD4	3
CD5	5
CD6	5
CD7	4
CD8	5
CD9	6
PLEO	9
At-large	14
Total pledged delegates	67

The 2020 Arizona Democratic presidential primary took place on March 17, 2020, the third primary Tuesday of the month, as one of three contests on the same day in the Democratic Party primaries for the 2020 presidential election, while the contest in Ohio had been postponed for roughly a month. The closed primary allocated 80 delegates towards the 2020 Democratic National Convention, of which 67 were pledged delegates allocated according to the results of the primary.

Three major candidates ran in the primary, including former vice president Joe Biden, senator Bernie Sanders from Vermont, and representative Tulsi Gabbard from Hawaii's 2nd district. 12 other candidates who withdrew prior to the contest were also on the ballot, along with three minor candidates. Biden won the primary, with almost 44% of the vote and 38 delegates, while Sanders came in second place with almost 33% of the vote and 29 delegates. In a distant third was former mayor Michael Bloomberg, who came close to 10%, even though he had suspended his campaign nearly two weeks before and had issued an official withdrawal with the state, still remaining on the ballot.

Biden won 13 of 15 counties, with the exception of Coconino and Yuma, and 7 of 9 congressional districts. Key to his victory were white voters, whom he won 51-32 per CNN exit polls, and suburban voters, who he won 53–32. In a stark contrast from 2016, Sanders' strength was reliant primarily on non-white and Hispanic voters, whom Biden won by only 47-45 and 45–44, respectively. Biden would ultimately win the state of Arizona in the general election by 10,457 votes, making him the first Democrat to win it since Bill Clinton in 1996 and only the second since Harry Truman did so in 1948.

== Procedure ==
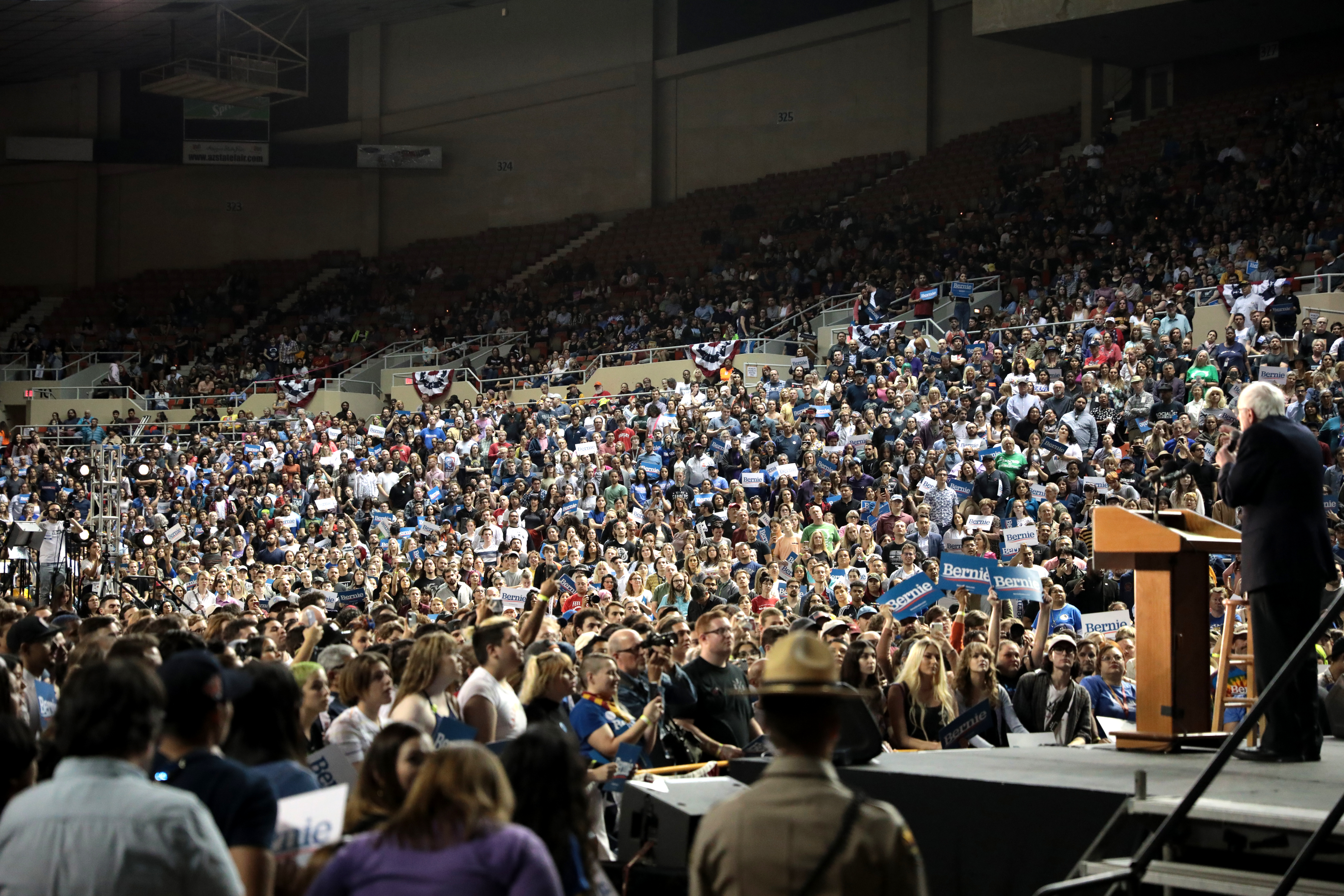
Sanders at a rally in Phoenix on March 5, 2020

Arizona was one of three states holding primaries on March 17, 2020, alongside Florida and Illinois, while only one day before Ohio had been the first state to postpone its primary due to the COVID-19 pandemic and cancel in-person voting, accepting ballots until April 28 instead.

Voters had to have registered as Democrats by February 18 to be eligible for voting in the primary. Arizona mailed ballots to voters on the permanent early voting list. Ballots had to be received by 7:00 p.m. on March 17, 2020. In addition, some Arizona counties offered early voting sites, where any voter could walk in and vote in person, Monday to Friday, from February 19 through March 13, 2020. Voting took place from 6:00 a.m. until 7:00 p.m MST. In the closed primary, candidates had to meet a threshold of 15 percent at the congressional district or statewide level in order to be considered viable for delegates. The 67 pledged delegates to the 2020 Democratic National Convention were allocated proportionally on the basis of the results of the primary. Of these, between 3 and 6 were allocated to each of the state's 9 congressional districts and another 9 were allocated to party leaders and elected officials (PLEO delegates), in addition to 14 at-large delegates. As a March primary on Stage I of the primary timetable Arizona received no bonus delegates, in order to disperse the primaries between more different date clusters and keep too many states from hoarding on a March date.

District caucuses were held on April 18, 2020, to designate national convention district delegates. The state convention and state committee meeting were subsequently held on May 16, 2020, to vote on the 14 at-large and 9 pledged PLEO delegates for the Democratic National Convention. The delegation also included 13 unpledged PLEO delegates: 7 members of the Democratic National Committee and 6 members of Congress (one senator and 5 representatives).

== Candidates ==
The following candidates appeared on the ballot in Arizona. Candidates that had filed a formal withdrawal with the office remained on the ballot because it had already been printed but their votes were not individually published in the final canvass, making them effectively ineligible.

Running

- Joe Biden
- Roque De La Fuente III
- Michael Ellinger
- Tulsi Gabbard
- Henry Hewes
- Bernie Sanders

Withdrawn

- Pete Buttigieg (Note: Candidate withdrew before Super Tuesday during early voting.)
- Julian Castro
- Deval Patrick
- Elizabeth Warren (Note: Candidate withdrew after Super Tuesday during early voting.)
- Marianne Williamson
- Andrew Yang

Formal withdrawal (ineligible)

- Michael Bennet
- Michael Bloomberg
- Cory Booker
- John Delaney
- Amy Klobuchar
- Tom Steyer

== Polling ==
Polling aggregation
Source of poll aggregation	Date updated	Dates polled	Joe Biden	Bernie Sanders	Tulsi Gabbard	Other/ Undecided (Note: Calculated by taking the difference of 100% and all other candidates combined)
270 to Win	Mar 17, 2020	Mar 3–16, 2020	50.6%	29.4%	1.0%	19.0%
RealClear Politics	Mar 17, 2020	Mar 6–15, 2020	51.7%	33.7%	1.0%	13.6%
FiveThirtyEight	Mar 17, 2020	until Mar 16, 2020 (Note: FiveThirtyEight aggregates polls with a trendline regression of polls rather than a strict average of recent polls.)	51.6%	26.9%	1.1%	20.4%
Average			51.3%	30.0%	1.0%	17.7%

Tabulation of individual polls of the 2020 Arizona Democratic primary
Poll source	Date(s) administered	Sample size (Note: Key: A – all adults RV – registered voters LV – likely voters V – unclear)	Margin of error	Joe Biden	Michael Bloomberg	Pete Buttigieg	Kamala Harris	Bernie Sanders	Elizabeth Warren	Andrew Yang	Other	Undecided
Swayable	Mar 16, 2020	1,167 (LV)	± 5.0%	53%	–	–	–	29%	–	–	19% (Note: Gabbard with 1%; "Other" with 18%)	–
Marist/NBC News	Mar 10–15, 2020	523 (LV)	± 6.0%	53%	–	–	–	36%	–	–	8% (Note: Gabbard with 1%; "Other" with 7%)	3%
Marist/NBC News	Mar 10–15, 2020	913 (RV)	± 4.5%	50%	–	–	–	37%	–	–	9% (Note: Gabbard with 2%; "Other" with 7%)	5%
Monmouth University	Mar 11–14, 2020	373 (LV)	± 5.1%	51%	5%	3%	–	31%	3%	–	2% (Note: Gabbard and Klobuchar with 1%; "Other" with <1%)	5%
Latino Decisions/Univision/ Arizona State University	Mar 6–11, 2020	541 (LV)	± 4.2%	57% (Note: In a two-person race)	–	–	–	38%	–	–	–	5%
Latino Decisions/Univision/ Arizona State University	Mar 6–11, 2020	541 (LV)	± 4.2%	51%	–	–	–	34%	–	–	6% (Note: Gabbard with 1%; "Other" with 5%)	8%
	March 4–5, 2020	Bloomberg and Warren withdraw from the race										
OH Predictive Insights	Mar 3–4, 2020	398 (LV)	± 4.9%	45%	12%	–	–	17%	13%	–	4% (Note: "Another Candidate" with 4%)	9%
	March 1–2, 2020	Buttigieg and Klobuchar withdraw from the race										
	February 11, 2020	New Hampshire primary; Yang withdraws from the race after close of polls										
	Dec 3, 2019	Harris withdraws from the race										
OH Predictive Insights	Oct 31 – Nov 8, 2019	260 (LV)	± 6.1%	29%	–	9%	5%	16%	18%	4%	19% (Note: Booker, Castro and Klobuchar with 2%; Bennet, Gabbard, O'Rourke and Steyer with 1%; Delaney with 0%; Bullock and Williamson with no voters; other with 7%)	–
Emerson Polling	Oct 25–28, 2019	339	± 5.2%	28%	–	12%	4%	21%	21%	5%	7% (Note: Gabbard, Klobuchar and O'Rourke with 2%; Sestak with 1%; Bennet, Booker, Bullock, Castro, Delaney, Steyer and Williamson with 0%; someone else with 2%)	–
Siena Research/New York Times	Oct 13–26, 2019	209	–	24%	–	5%	3%	16%	15%	1%	1% (Note: Klobuchar with 1%; Booker, Gabbard and O'Rourke with 0%; others with 0%)	31%
Change Research	Sep 27–28, 2019	396 (LV)	–	15%	–	13%	4%	19%	35%	8%	7% (Note: O'Rourke with 3%; Booker, Castro, Gabbard and Klobuchar with 1%; Steyer with 0%)	–
Bendixen&Amandi	Sep 9–12, 2019	250	± 4.3%	29%	–	5%	4%	18%	24%	2%	8% (Note: O'Rourke with 4%; Castro, Klobuchar and Williamson with 1%; someone else with 1%)	10%
Zogby Analytics	May 23–29, 2019	197	± 7.0%	35%	–	6%	4%	16%	10%	0%	11% (Note: Booker, Castro, Delaney, and O'Rourke with 2%; Gabbard, Gillibrand, and Hickenlooper with 1%; Inslee and Klobuchar with 0%)	–

== Results ==
Popular vote share by county Biden—40–50% Biden—50–60% Sanders—30–40% Sanders—40–50%

2020 Arizona Democratic presidential primary
Candidate	Votes	%	Delegates
Joe Biden	268,029	43.70	38
Bernie Sanders	200,456	32.70	29
Elizabeth Warren (withdrawn)	35,537	5.79	
Pete Buttigieg (withdrawn)	24,868	4.05	
Tulsi Gabbard	3,014	0.49	
Andrew Yang (withdrawn)	1,921	0.31	
Julian Castro (withdrawn)	754	0.12	
Marianne Williamson (withdrawn)	668	0.11	
Deval Patrick (withdrawn)	242	0.04	
Henry Hewes	208	0.03	
Other candidates	812	0.13	
Other votes	4,942	0.81	
Ineligible candidates (Note: While Bloomberg, Klobuchar, Steyer, Delaney, Booker and Bennet had formally withdrawn and were not published in the final state canvass, those ballots were included by the state as part of overall cast ballots and any media covering the primary reported individual vote tallies for those candidates.) Michael Bloomberg; Amy Klobuchar; Tom Steyer; John Delaney; Cory Booker; Michael Bennet	71,904 58,797; 10,333; 1,381; 505; 494; 394	11.72 9.59; 1.68; 0.23; 0.08; 0.08; 0.06	
Total	613,355	100%	67

=== By county ===
County	Joe Biden		Bernie Sanders		Elizabeth Warren (withdrawn†)		Pete Buttigieg (withdrawn†)		Tulsi Gabbard		Andrew Yang (withdrawn)		Julián Castro (withdrawn)		Marianne Williamson (withdrawn)		Rocky De La Fuente		Deval Patrick (withdrawn)		Henry Hewes		Michael A. Ellinger		Others (Note: Percentages reported by the Arizona Secretary of State do not add up to 100. This may be due to the fact that candidates who formally withdrew (Bennet, Bloomberg, Booker, Delaney, Klobuchar, and Steyer) do not have their vote totals officially reported.) (Note: Calculated by subtracting the totals of all reported candidates from the total votes reported.)		Margin		Total votes cast	Eligible voters	Voter turnout
County	#	%	#	%	#	%	#	%	#	%	#	%	#	%	#	%	#	%	#	%	#	%	#	%	#	%	#	%	Total votes cast	Eligible voters	Voter turnout
Apache	3,092	44.0%	2,523	35.9%	252	3.6%	143	2.0%	48	0.7%	36	0.5%	20	0.3%	25	0.4%	26	0.4%	22	0.3%	13	0.2%	10	0.1%	818	11.6%	569	8.1%	7,028	28,734	24.5%
Cochise	4,123	41.7%	2,694	27.3%	678	6.9%	466	4.7%	93	0.9%	34	0.3%	22	0.2%	20	0.2%	26	0.3%	10	0.1%	8	0.1%	4	0.0%	1,710	17.3%	1,429	14.4%	9,888	20,356	48.6%
Coconino	6,578	37.4%	7,650	43.5%	1,255	7.1%	527	3.0%	94	0.5%	64	0.4%	16	0.1%	23	0.1%	17	0.1%	13	0.1%	9	0.1%	5	0.0%	1,354	7.7%	–1,072	–6.1%	17,605	35,901	49.0%
Gila	2,041	47.8%	928	21.7%	192	4.5%	181	4.2%	37	0.9%	25	0.6%	10	0.2%	24	0.6%	8	0.2%	3	0.0%	11	0.3%	2	0.1%	807	18.9%	1,113	26.1%	4,269	8,845	48.3%
Graham	774	46.2%	420	25.0%	70	4.2%	44	2.6%	17	1.0%	14	0.8%	8	0.5%	5	0.3%	10	0.6%	0	0.0%	2	0.1%	0	0.0%	313	18.7%	354	21.1%	1,677	5,082	33.0%
Greenlee	316	45.0%	138	19.6%	25	3.6%	30	4.3%	14	2.0%	6	0.9%	4	0.6%	1	0.1%	4	0.6%	0	0.0%	3	0.4%	1	0.1%	161	22.9%	178	25.3%	703	1,756	40.0%
La Paz	323	44.8%	193	26.8%	29	4.0%	21	2.9%	6	0.8%	6	0.8%	5	0.7%	3	0.4%	2	0.3%	1	0.1%	1	0.1%	2	0.3%	129	17.9%	130	18.0%	721	2,282	31.6%
Maricopa	153,707	42.9%	120,379	33.6%	20,584	5.7%	15,346	4.3%	1,620	0.4%	1,109	0.3%	345	0.1%	307	0.1%	297	0.1%	121	0.0%	99	0.0%	92	0.0%	44,384	12.4%	33,328	9.3%	358,390	732,376	48.9%
Mohave	4,450	47.4%	2,142	22.8%	432	4.6%	493	5.3%	64	0.7%	38	0.4%	7	0.1%	18	0.2%	16	0.2%	7	0.1%	7	0.1%	5	0.4%	1,701	18.1%	2,308	24.6%	9,380	20,872	44.9%
Navajo	3,585	44.3%	2,617	32.8%	316	3.9%	193	2.4%	54	0.7%	59	0.7%	14	0.2%	25	0.3%	18	0.2%	11	0.1%	14	0.2%	10	0.1%	1,169	14.5%	968	12.0%	8,085	25,215	32.1%
Pima	60,622	45.3%	42,954	32.1%	8,602	6.4%	4,907	3.7%	613	0.5%	306	0.2%	149	0.1%	105	0.1%	88	0.1%	32	0.0%	20	0.0%	33	0.0%	15,378	11.5%	17,668	13.2%	133,809	237,568	56.3%
Pinal	12,450	48.4%	6,658	25.9%	1,165	4.5%	1,030	4.0%	148	0.6%	106	0.4%	39	0.2%	33	0.1%	45	0.2%	6	0.0%	12	0.1%	3	0.0%	4,032	15.7%	5,792	22.5%	25,727	60,034	42.9%
Santa Cruz	1,876	40.6%	1,547	33.5%	194	4.2%	131	2.8%	15	0.3%	18	0.4%	22	0.5%	12	0.3%	25	0.5%	2	0.0%	0	0.0%	6	0.1%	775	16.8%	329	7.1%	4,623	13,552	34.1%
Yavapai	10,317	47.9%	5,717	26.5%	1,355	6.3%	1,015	4.7%	129	0.6%	56	0.3%	5	0.0%	42	0.2%	5	0.0%	3	0.0%	5	0.0%	3	0.0%	2,891	13.4%	4,600	21.4%	21,543	31,856	67.6%
Yuma	3,775	38.1%	3,896	39.3%	388	3.9%	341	3.4%	62	0.6%	44	0.4%	88	0.9%	25	0.3%	41	0.4%	11	0.1%	4	0.0%	8	0.1%	1,224	12.4%	–121	–1.2%	9,907	31,914	31.0%
Totals	268,029	43.7%	200,456	32.7%	35,537	5.8%	24,868	4.1%	3,014	0.5%	1,921	0.3%	754	0.1%	668	0.1%	628	0.1%	242	0.0%	208	0.0%	184	0.0%	76,846	12.5%	67,573	11.0%	613,355	1,256,343	48.8%

=== By congressional district ===
Congressional district	Joe Biden		Bernie Sanders		Elizabeth Warren (withdrawn†)		Pete Buttigieg (withdrawn†)		Tulsi Gabbard		Andrew Yang (withdrawn)		Julián Castro (withdrawn)		Marianne Williamson (withdrawn)		Rocky De La Fuente		Deval Patrick (withdrawn)		Henry Hewes		Michael A. Ellinger		Others (Note: Percentages reported by the Arizona Secretary of State do not add up to 100. This may be due to the fact that candidates who formally withdrew (Bennet, Bloomberg, Booker, Delaney, Klobuchar, and Steyer) do not have their vote totals officially reported.)		Margin		Total votes cast	Eligible voters	Voter turnout
Congressional district	#	%	#	%	#	%	#	%	#	%	#	%	#	%	#	%	#	%	#	%	#	%	#	%	#	%	#	%	Total votes cast	Eligible voters	Voter turnout
1st	32,749	45.8%	22,336	31.2%	3,776	5.3%	2,472	3.5%	432	0.6%	302	0.4%	107	0.2%	119	0.2%	117	0.2%	53	0.1%	55	0.1%	33	0.1%	8,954	12.5%	10,413	14.6%	71,505	167,908	42.6%
2nd	43,970	45.9%	28,927	30.2%	6,741	7.0%	3,814	4.0%	479	0.5%	240	0.3%	82	0.1%	88	0.1%	72	0.1%	30	0.0%	19	0.0%	18	0.0%	11,238	11.7%	15,043	15.7%	95,718	160,428	59.7%
3rd	23,744	38.7%	24,766	40.4%	2,724	4.4%	1,595	2.6%	292	0.5%	180	0.3%	222	0.4%	72	0.1%	115	0.2%	34	0.1%	17	0.0%	31	0.1%	7,505	12.2%	−1,022	−1.7%	61,297	158,635	38.6%
4th	22,338	47.4%	11,925	25.3%	2,550	5.4%	2,298	4.9%	293	0.6%	164	0.4%	42	0.1%	100	0.2%	61	0.1%	20	0.0%	31	0.1%	15	0.0%	7,291	15.5%	10,413	22.1%	47,128	90,296	52.2%
5th	27,851	44.3%	19,636	31.3%	3,721	5.9%	3,020	4.8%	302	0.5%	210	0.3%	36	0.1%	58	0.1%	35	0.1%	8	0.0%	13	0.0%	13	0.0%	7,920	12.6%	8,215	13.1%	62,823	121,006	51.9%
6th	34,295	47.4%	19,878	27.5%	4,240	5.9%	3,570	4.9%	347	0.5%	156	0.2%	33	0.1%	57	0.1%	34	0.1%	20	0.0%	15	0.0%	10	0.0%	9,676	13.4%	14,417	19.9%	72,331	129,893	55.7%
7th	19,789	35.6%	24,701	44.4%	2,676	4.8%	1,572	2.8%	182	0.3%	191	0.3%	124	0.2%	42	0.1%	77	0.1%	27	0.1%	11	0.0%	23	0.0%	6,202	11.2%	−4,912	−8.8%	55,617	148,509	37.5%
8th	30,594	46.8%	17,537	26.8%	3,420	5.2%	3,098	4.7%	334	0.5%	206	0.3%	59	0.1%	74	0.1%	59	0.1%	22	0.0%	28	0.0%	21	0.0%	9,985	15.3%	13,057	20.0%	65,437	123,996	52.8%
9th	32,699	40.1%	30,750	37.7%	5,689	7.0%	3,429	4.2%	353	0.4%	272	0.3%	49	0.1%	58	0.1%	58	0.1%	28	0.0%	19	0.0%	20	0.0%	8,075	9.9%	1,949	2.4%	81,499	155,672	52.4%
Totals	268,029	43.7%	200,456	32.7%	35,537	5.8%	24,868	4.1%	3,014	0.5%	1,921	0.3%	754	0.1%	668	0.1%	628	0.1%	242	0.0%	208	0.0%	184	0.0%	76,846	12.5%	67,573	11.0%	613,355	1,256,343	48.8%

== Analysis ==
Arizona was a hotly contested state throughout both the primary and general election seasons due to its rapidly diversifying electorate. A high concentration of Hispanic and Latino voters as well as an intense swing to the left in suburban areas and the Republican Party having moved to the right, strengthened Democratic support while drawing new divides in the Democratic Party. In 2016, Hillary Clinton defeated Bernie Sanders by a 14.9% margin; despite Sanders being trailing Biden significantly nationwide, he actually improved on his performance in Arizona in 2020, losing it by an 11.0% margin. This improvement was mostly attributable to improvements among Hispanic and Latino voters: Sanders performed well among that demographic throughout the primary as opposed to 2016, when Clinton handily carried regions with high densities of Hispanic voters. Per CNN exit polls, Biden won Hispanic voters 45-44 compared to white voters, who he won 51–32. Sanders won Yuma County, where 64.6% of the population are Hispanic or Latino, as well as Arizona's 3rd and 7th congressional districts; the former, home to Tucson, Yuma, and most of the southern border, is 65.1% Hispanic, while the latter, composing much of inner Phoenix, is 64.0% Hispanic. Nonetheless, Biden's performance represented a significant improvement among voters of these demographics from earlier in the primary, which was compounded by a strong performance in the state's suburbs. He won Maricopa County, which holds Phoenix and 61.6% of the population, by 33,328 votes, largely due to the Phoenix suburbs, which have been reliably Republican since the 1950s but have recently shifted to the left. He also won Pima County, the second largest county and home to Tucson, by 17,668 votes.

The results of the primary would be reflected in the general election: Biden would end up winning Arizona by 10,457 votes, the first Democrat to do so since Bill Clinton in 1996 and only the second since Harry S. Truman in 1948. He would also become the first to win crucial Maricopa County since Truman. His performance in predominantly-Hispanic areas in urban areas and along the southern border would also decline compared to 2016, though would be supplemented by a raw increase in voter turnout.
