= 2020 Illinois Democratic presidential primary =

- March 17, 2020

182 delegates (155 pledged, 27 unpledged) to the Democratic National Convention The number of pledged delegates won is determined by the popular vote

Candidate	Joe Biden	Bernie Sanders
Home state	Delaware	Vermont
Delegate count	95	60
Popular vote	986,661	605,701
Percentage	58.94%	36.18%
- Results by county Biden: 50-60% 60-70% 70-80% Sanders: 40-50%

Pledged national convention delegates
Type	Del.	Type	Del.
CD1	8	CD10	5
CD2	7	CD11	5
CD3	6	CD12	5
CD4	5	CD13	5
CD5	7	CD14	5
CD6	6	CD15	3
CD7	8	CD16	4
CD8	5	CD17	5
CD9	8	CD18	4
PLEO	20	At-large	34
Total pledged delegates			155

The 2020 Illinois Democratic presidential primary took place on March 17, 2020, the third primary Tuesday of the month, as one of three states voting on the same day in the Democratic Party primaries for the 2020 presidential election, while the contest in Ohio had been postponed for roughly a month. The Illinois primary was an open primary, with the state awarding 182 delegates to the 2020 Democratic National Convention, of which 155 were pledged delegates allocated based on the results of the primary.

Immediately after the polls closed at 7:00 pm Central Time, the Associated Press declared former vice president Joe Biden the winner of the Illinois primary. Biden was victorious in all but one county, Champaign County, winning 59% of the vote and 95 delegates, while Senator Bernie Sanders received the rest of 36% and 60 delegates. Together with his victories on the same day in Florida and Arizona, Biden greatly expanded the gap in delegates between him and Sanders. Voter turnout was significantly down from 2016, due to the closure of polling places as a result of the COVID-19 pandemic.

== Procedure ==
Illinois was one of three states which held primaries on March 17, 2020, alongside Arizona and Florida, while only one day before Ohio had been the first state to postpone its primary due to the COVID-19 pandemic and cancel in-person voting, accepting ballots until April 28 instead.

Voting took place throughout the state from 6:00 a.m. until 7:00 p.m. In the open primary, candidates had to meet a threshold of 15 percent at the congressional district or statewide level to be considered viable. The 155 pledged delegates to the 2020 Democratic National Convention were allocated proportionally based on the results of the primary. Of these, between three and eight were allocated to each of the state's 18 congressional districts and another 20 were allocated to party leaders and elected officials (PLEO delegates), in addition to 34 at-large delegates. As a March primary on Stage I of the primary timetable Illinois received no bonus delegates, to disperse the primaries between more different date clusters and keep too many states from hoarding on a March date.

National convention district-level delegates were listed on the ballot and chosen during the primary. The national convention delegation meeting was subsequently held on April 27, 2020, to vote on the 34 at-large and 20 pledged PLEO delegates for the Democratic National Convention through a quorum of district delegates. The delegation also included 27 unpledged PLEO delegates: 10 members of the Democratic National Committee, 15 members of Congress (both senators and 13 representatives), the governor J. B. Pritzker, and former president Barack Obama.

== Candidates ==
The following candidates qualified for the ballot in Illinois:

Running

- Joe Biden
- Tulsi Gabbard
- Bernie Sanders

Withdrawn

- Michael Bennet (Note: Candidate withdrew after the New Hampshire primary when early voting had already begun.)
- Michael Bloomberg (Note: Candidate withdrew after Super Tuesday during early voting.)
- Cory Booker
- Pete Buttigieg (Note: Candidate withdrew shortly before Super Tuesday during early voting.)
- John Delaney
- Deval Patrick
- Tom Steyer
- Elizabeth Warren
- Andrew Yang

== Polling ==
Polling aggregation
Source of poll aggregation	Date updated	Dates polled	Joe Biden	Bernie Sanders	Tulsi Gabbard	Un- decided (Note: Calculated by taking the difference of 100% and all other candidates combined)
270toWin	Mar 17, 2020	Mar 7–16, 2020	58.6%	30.2%	2.0%	9.2%
RealClear Politics	Mar 17, 2020	Mar 10–12, 2020	60.0%	30.5%	– (Note: Gabbard not averaged)	9.5%
FiveThirtyEight	Mar 17, 2020	until Mar 16, 2020 (Note: FiveThirtyEight aggregates polls with a trendline regression of polls rather than a strict average of recent polls.)	61.5%	26.6%	1.5%	10.4%
Average			60.0%	29.1%	1.8%	9.1%

Tabulation of individual polls of the 2020 Illinois Democratic primary
Poll source	Date(s) administered	Sample size (Note: Key: A – all adults RV – registered voters LV – likely voters V – unclear)	Margin of error	Joe Biden	Michael Bloomberg	Pete Buttigieg	Kamala Harris	Amy Klobuchar	Bernie Sanders	Elizabeth Warren	Other	Undecided
Swayable	Mar 16, 2020	1,861 (LV)	± 3.0%	63%	–	–	–	–	28%	–	10% (Note: Gabbard with 3%; "Other" with 7%)	–
Emerson College/Nexstar	Mar 11–12, 2020	567 (LV)	± 4.1%	57%	–	–	–	–	36%	–	2% (Note: Gabbard with 2%)	6%
Gravis Marketing	Mar 10–12, 2020	549 (LV)	± 4.2%	63%	–	–	–	–	25%	–	–	12%
ROI Rocket	Mar 6–12, 2020	960 (LV)	± 3.1%	57%	–	–	–	–	34%	–	– (Note: Not yet released)	–
Victory Research	Mar 7–9, 2020	1,200 (LV)	± 2.83%	55%	–	–	–	–	36%	–	1% (Note: Gabbard with 1%)	8%
Ogden & Fry/Northwest Side GOP Club	Mar 8, 2020	457(LV)	± 4.58%	64%	–	–	–	–	32%	–	4% (Note: Gabbard with 4%)	– (Note: Result after "Undecided" is ruled out as an option.)
Ogden & Fry/Northwest Side GOP Club	Mar 8, 2020	457(LV)	± 4.58%	55%	–	–	–	–	26%	–	2% (Note: Gabbard with 2%)	16%
	Mar 1–5, 2020	Buttigieg, Klobuchar, Bloomberg, and Warren withdraw from the race										
Victory Research	Feb 17–19, 2020	1,200(LV)	± 2.83%	20.3%	14.5%	11.4%	–	6.3%	25.6%	6.6%	4.4% (Note: Steyer with 3.4%; Gabbard with 1.0%)	10.9%
Southern Illinois University	Feb 10–17, 2020	475 (LV)	± 4.5%	14%	17%	13%	–	8%	22%	6%	2% (Note: Steyer and Yang with 1%; someone else with 1%)	17%
	Dec 3, 2019	Harris withdraws from the race										
Victory Research	Nov 27 – Dec 1, 2019	1,500 (RV)	±2.83%	23.2%	3.6%	15.9%	3.2%	2.6%	15.0%	17.4%	12.3% (Note: Patrick with 2.4%; Booker with 2.3%; Steyer with 1.8%; Castro with 1.6%; Yang with 1.0%; Gabbard with 0.9%; Williamson with 0.8%; Bennet with 0.6%; Bullock with 0.5%; Sestak with 0.3%; Delaney with 0.1%)	6.9%
Victory Research	Jul 26–29, 2019	1,200	± 2.83%	36.1%	–	9.3%	8.6%	1.7%	15.2%	12.8%	9.2% (Note: O'Rourke with 2.1%; Booker with 1.4%; Gillibrand with 1.0%; Steyer with 0.8%; Inslee with 0.7%; Castro with 0.6%; de Blasio with 0.4%; Bullock, Gabbard, Hickenlooper, Ryan, Williamson and Yang with 0.3%; Gravel with 0.2%; Moulton and Sestak with 0.1%; Delaney and Messam with 0.0%)	7.3%

== Results ==
2020 Illinois Democratic presidential primary
Candidate	Votes	%	Delegates
Joe Biden	986,661	58.94	95
Bernie Sanders	605,701	36.18	60
Michael Bloomberg (withdrawn)	25,500	1.52	
Elizabeth Warren (withdrawn)	24,413	1.46	
Pete Buttigieg (withdrawn)	9,729	0.58	
Tulsi Gabbard	9,642	0.58	
Andrew Yang (withdrawn)	4,021	0.24	
Cory Booker (withdrawn)	2,684	0.16	
Tom Steyer (withdrawn)	1,684	0.10	
Deval Patrick (withdrawn)	1,567	0.09	
Michael Bennet (withdrawn)	1,346	0.08	
John Delaney (withdrawn)	1,185	0.07	
Total	1,674,133	100%	155

== Analysis ==
Joe Biden won Illinois in the Democratic primary securing 91 delegates, while Bernie Sanders won the other 60. Biden won the state by a wide margin, with Biden winning many of the blue collar workers who previously voted for Sanders back in 2016. However, Sanders was able to maintain his lead with young and extremely liberal voters, which made up most of his base. This contributed to Sanders being able to carry Champaign county, home of the University of Illinois.

The Illinois Democratic primary furthered the gap of delegates between Biden and Sanders. The Illinois primary, along with other Rust-Belt primaries such as Michigan, signaled a weakening Sanders coalition.

== See also ==
- 2020 Illinois Republican presidential primary
- 2020 United States presidential election in Illinois
- 2020 Illinois elections
- Illinois Fair Tax Nov. 2020 ballot referendum
