= 2020 Ohio Democratic presidential primary =

- April 28, 2020

154 delegates (136 pledged, 18 unpledged) to the Democratic National Convention The number of pledged delegates won is determined by the popular vote

Candidate	Joe Biden	Bernie Sanders (withdrawn)
Home state	Delaware	Vermont
Delegate count	115	21
Popular vote	647,284	149,683
Percentage	72.37%	16.74%
Joe Biden
Biden
30–40%
40–50%
50–60%
60–70%
70–80%
80–90%
>90%
Sanders
30–40%
40–50%
50–60%
60–70%
70–80%
80–90%
>90%
Tie
30–40%
40–50%
50%
No votes

Pledged national convention delegates
Type	Del.	Type	Del.
CD1	6	CD9	6
CD2	5	CD10	6
CD3	7	CD11	9
CD4	4	CD12	6
CD5	5	CD13	6
CD6	3	CD14	6
CD7	4	CD15	6
CD8	4	CD16	6
PLEO	18	At-large	29
Total pledged delegates			136

The 2020 Ohio Democratic presidential primary took place through April 28, 2020, as part of the Democratic Party primaries for the 2020 presidential election. In-person voting, originally scheduled for March 17, 2020 (along with three different states), had been cancelled due to the COVID-19 pandemic. The Ohio primary was a semi-open primary and awarded 154 delegates towards the 2020 Democratic National Convention, of which 136 were pledged delegates allocated based on the results of the primary.

The legislature and governor ultimately made the decision to run an all-mail primary, with no in-person voting, allowing votes to be received through April 28. Former vice president Joe Biden, the only Democrat still in the race, won the primary with more than 72% of the vote and 115 delegates. Senator Bernie Sanders caught 21 delegates, surpassing the threshold with around 17%.

== Procedure ==
The primary, scheduled for March 17, 2020 on the same day as Arizona, Florida and Illinois (whose primaries were not moved), had initially been postponed to June 2 one day before voting day, but was subsequently set to continue by extending mail-in voting until April 28 through a law signed by governor Mike DeWine on March 27. Mails had to be received by post until April 27, with the additional option to hand-deliver mail-in ballots on April 28. It was the only contest on that day, as all six states originally planned for that day postponed their primaries.

In the semi-open primary, candidates had to meet a threshold of 15 percent at the congressional district or statewide level in order to be considered viable. The 136 pledged delegates to the 2020 Democratic National Convention were allocated proportionally on the basis of the results of the primary. Of these, between three and nine were allocated to each of the state's 16 congressional districts and another 18 were allocated to party leaders and elected officials (PLEO delegates), in addition to 29 at-large delegates. As Ohio's primary had originally been planned for a March date on Stage I of the primary timetable, it received no bonus delegates by the Democratic National Committee.

District delegates to the national convention were planned to be elected at post-primary caucuses on April 16, 2020; should candidates have received more delegates based on the results of the primary than delegate candidates presented at the time, then additional delegates would have been nominated during these caucuses. The state executive committee of the party subsequently would have met on May 9, 2020, to vote on the 29 at-large and 18 pledged PLEO delegates for the Democratic National Convention. The delegation also included 18 unpledged PLEO delegates: 12 members of the Democratic National Committee, 5 members of Congress (one senator and four representatives, notably temporary presidential contender Tim Ryan), and former DNC chair David Wilhelm.

=== Postponement and delay ===
The primary had originally been scheduled for March 17, 2020. While only the Ohio General Assembly, and not the governor, had the authority to schedule a new election day Republican Governor of Ohio Mike DeWine recommended on March 16 moving the primary election to June amid concerns over the COVID-19 pandemic in the United States. As he did not have the power to unilaterally make this decision, he went to court to support a lawsuit requesting the delay, but a judge rejected the lawsuit. Later in the day, the Health Director ordered the polls closed as a health emergency. Early on March 17, the Ohio Supreme Court denied the challenge to the state and allowed the primary's delay to proceed.

The governor had proposed to the state legislature that June 2 would be the replacement day, but the final joint decision by the legislature and governor was to run an all-mail primary, with voting through April 28.

== Candidates ==
The following people appeared on the ballot in Ohio:

Running

- Joe Biden

Withdrawn

- Michael Bennet
- Michael Bloomberg
- Pete Buttigieg
- Deval Patrick
- Tulsi Gabbard
- Amy Klobuchar
- Bernie Sanders
- Tom Steyer
- Elizabeth Warren

Andrew Yang (as well as John Delaney) did not qualify for the ballot due to invalid petitions, with Yang running a registered write-in campaign instead.

== Polling ==
Polling Aggregation
Source of poll aggregation	Date updated	Dates polled	Joe Biden	Bernie Sanders	Other/ Undecided (Note: Calculated by taking the difference of 100% and all other candidates combined)
270 to Win	Mar 16, 2020	Mar 10–13, 2020	57.5%	35.0%	7.5%
RealClear Politics	Mar 16, 2020	Mar 10–13, 2020	57.5%	35.0%	7.5%
FiveThirtyEight	Mar 16, 2020	until Mar 13, 2020 (Note: FiveThirtyEight aggregates polls with a trendline regression of polls rather than a strict average of recent polls.)	58.7%	32.3%	9.0%
Average			57.9%	34.1%	8.0%

Tabulation of individual polls of the 2020 Ohio Democratic primary
Poll source	Date(s) administered	Sample size (Note: Key: A – all adults RV – registered voters LV – likely voters V – unclear)	Margin of error	Joe Biden	Michael Bloomberg	Cory Booker	Pete Buttigieg	Kamala Harris	Bernie Sanders	Elizabeth Warren	Andrew Yang	Other	Undecided
	Apr 8, 2020	Sanders suspends his campaign: Politico Story											
Swayable	Mar 16, 2020	2,027 (LV)	± 3.0%	66%	–	–	–	–	24%	–	–	10% (Note: Gabbard with 6%; "Other" with 4%)	–
Marist/NBC News	Mar 10–13, 2020	486 (LV)	± 5.6%	58%	–	–	–	–	35%	–	–	4% (Note: Gabbard with 2%; "Other" with 2%)	4%
Marist/NBC News	Mar 10–13, 2020	830 (RV)	± 4.1%	56%	–	–	–	–	36%	–	–	4% (Note: Gabbard with 2%; "Other" with 2%)	4%
Emerson College/Nexstar	Mar 11–12, 2020	464 (LV)	± 4.5%	57%	–	–	–	–	35%	–	–	1% (Note: Gabbard with 1%)	7%
ROI Rocket	Mar 6–12, 2020	880 (LV)	± 3.3%	61%	–	–	–	–	33%	–	–	– (Note: Not yet released)	–
	Mar 5, 2020	Warren withdraws from the race											
	Mar 4, 2020	Bloomberg withdraws from the race: NYT Story											
	Mar 2, 2020	Klobuchar withdraws from the race: NYT Story											
	Mar 1, 2020	Buttigieg withdraws from the race: NYT Story											
	Feb 29, 2020	South Carolina primary; Steyer withdraws from the race after close of polls											
	Feb 11, 2020	New Hampshire primary; Yang and Bennet withdraw from the race after close of polls											
	Feb 3, 2020	Iowa Caucuses											
Baldwin Wallace University/Oakland; University/Ohio Northern University	Jan 8–20, 2020	428 (RV)	–	32.1%	10.1%	–	6.1%	–	20.8%	10.7%	2.1%	5.7% (Note: Steyer with 2.2%; Klobuchar with 1.5%; Bennet with 0.8%; Gabbard with 0.5%; Delaney with 0.4%; Patrick with 0.3%)	9.8%
	Jan 13, 2020	Booker withdraws from the race											
	Jan 10, 2020	Williamson withdraws from the race											
	Jan 2, 2020	Castro withdraws from the race											
	Dec 3, 2019	Harris withdraws from the race											
	Nov 24, 2019	Bloomberg announces his candidacy											
	Nov 1, 2019	O'Rourke withdraws from the race											
	Oct 24, 2019	Ryan withdraws from the race											
Climate Nexus	Oct 1–7, 2019	443 (LV)	–	32%	–	3%	5%	6%	13%	21%	3%	17% (Note: Ryan with 2%; Castro, Delaney, O'Rourke, Steyer and Williamson with 1%; Bennet, Bullock, Gabbard, Klobuchar, Messam and Sestak with 0%; Other/Unsure with 10%)	– (Note: The poll did not provide separate information for this entry, so it is grouped under 'other'.)
Emerson	Sep 29 – Oct 2, 2019	353 (LV)	± 5.2%	29%	–	0%	5%	7%	27%	21%	3%	5% (Note: O'Rourke with 2%; Delaney, Gabbard, and Bullock with 1%; Ryan, Bennett, Klobuchar, Sestak, Steyer, Castro, and Messam with 0%)	2%
Quinnipiac	Jul 17–22, 2019	556	± 5.1%	31%	–	1%	6%	14%	14%	13%	1%	6% (Note: Castro, Gabbard, Klobuchar, O'Rourke, Ryan, and Steyer with 1%; Bennet, de Blasio, Bullock, Delaney, Gillibrand, Gravel, Hickenlooper, Inslee, Messam, Moulton, and Sestak with 0%)	11%
Zogby Analytics	May 23–29, 2019	222	± 6.6%	29%	–	3%	6%	5%	19%	12%	3%	6% (Note: O'Rourke with 2%; Delaney, Gabbard, Gillibrand, Hickenlooper, and Klobuchar with 1%; Castro and Inslee with 0%)	–

== Results ==
2020 Ohio Democratic presidential primary
Candidate	Votes	%	Delegates
Joe Biden	647,284	72.37	115
Bernie Sanders (withdrawn)	149,683	16.74	21
Elizabeth Warren (withdrawn)	30,985	3.46	
Michael Bloomberg (withdrawn)	28,704	3.21	
Pete Buttigieg (withdrawn)	15,113	1.69	
Amy Klobuchar (withdrawn)	11,899	1.33	
Tulsi Gabbard (withdrawn)	4,560	0.51	
Tom Steyer (withdrawn)	2,801	0.31	
Michael Bennet (withdrawn)	2,030	0.23	
Deval Patrick (withdrawn)	822	0.09	
Andrew Yang (write-in; withdrawn)	502	0.06	
Total	894,383	100%	136

== See also ==
- 2020 Ohio Republican presidential primary
- Impact of the COVID-19 pandemic on politics

== Notes ==
Additional candidates
