= 2020 Florida Democratic presidential primary =

- March 17, 2020

249 delegates (219 pledged, 30 unpledged) to the Democratic National Convention The number of pledged delegates won is determined by the popular vote

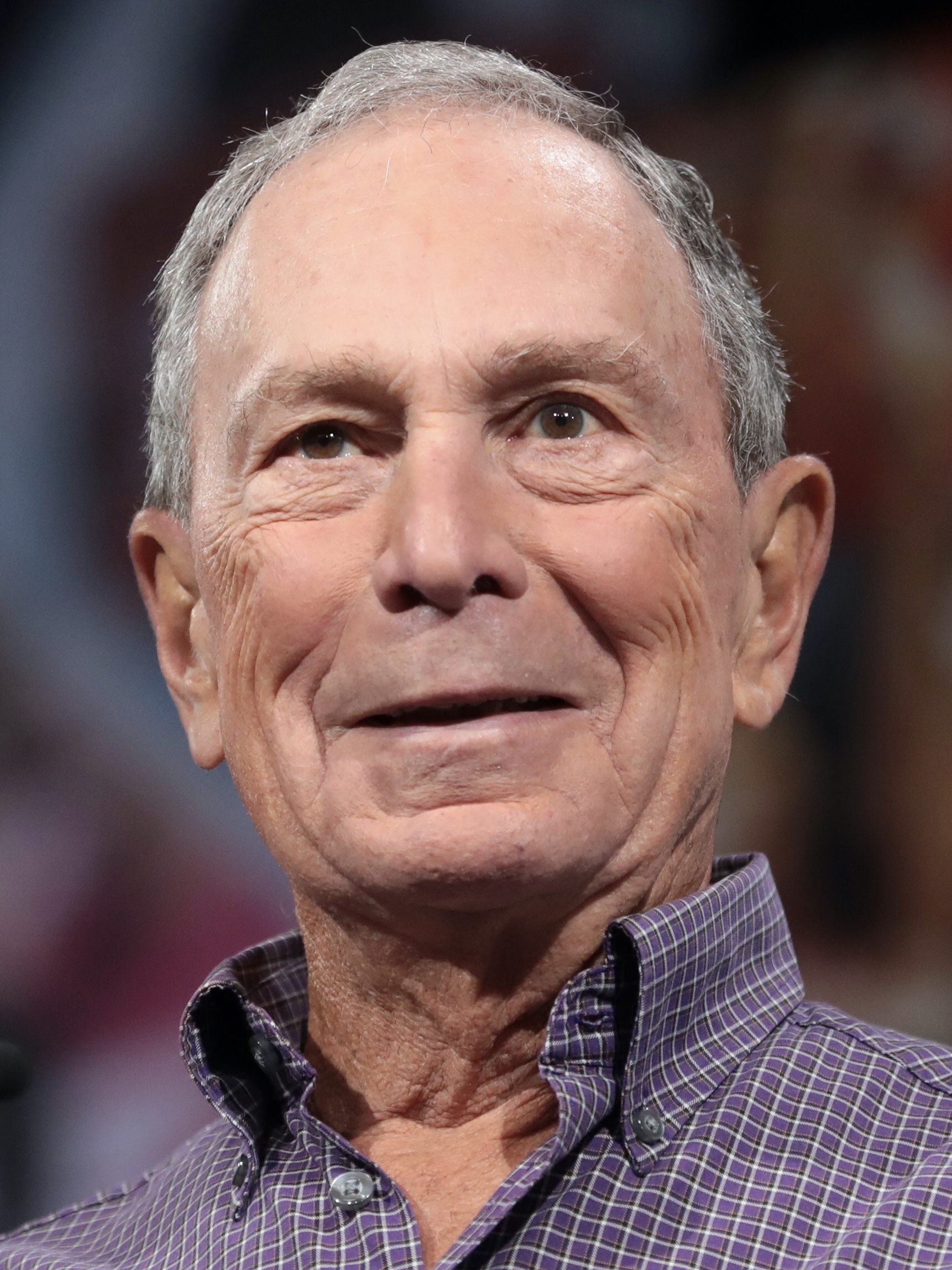
| Candidate | Joe Biden | Bernie Sanders | Michael Bloomberg (withdrawn) (Note: Bloomberg withdrew on March 4, 2020, 13 days before the primary. At that time, in a few counties early voting had begun.) |
| Home state | Delaware | Vermont | New York |
| Delegate count | 162 | 57 | 0 |
| Popular vote | 1,077,375 | 397,311 | 146,544 |
| Percentage | 61.95% | 22.84% | 8.43% |
Biden
40–50%
50–60%
60–70%
70–80%
80–90%
Joe Biden
Biden
<30%
30–40%
40–50%
50–60%
60–70%
70–80%
80–90%
90-100%
Sanders
30–40%
40–50%
50–60%
60–70%
70-80%
80-90%
90–100%
Others
Bloomberg 30–40%
Bloomberg 60–70%
Bloomberg 90–100%
Buttigieg 90–100%
Warren 90–100%
Gabbard 90–100%
Tie/No Votes
20–30% Tie
30–40% Tie
40–50% Tie
50% Tie
No Votes
Joe Biden
Bernie Sanders
Michael Bloomberg
Pete Buttigieg
Elizabeth Warren
Tulsi Gabbard

Pledged national convention delegates
| Type | Del. | Type | Del. | Type | Del. |
|---|---|---|---|---|---|
| CD1 | 3 | CD10 | 6 | CD19 | 5 |
| CD2 | 4 | CD11 | 4 | CD20 | 7 |
| CD3 | 5 | CD12 | 5 | CD21 | 7 |
| CD4 | 6 | CD13 | 6 | CD22 | 7 |
| CD5 | 5 | CD14 | 6 | CD23 | 6 |
| CD6 | 5 | CD15 | 5 | CD24 | 6 |
| CD7 | 6 | CD16 | 6 | CD25 | 3 |
| CD8 | 5 | CD17 | 4 | CD26 | 5 |
| CD9 | 6 | CD18 | 5 | CD27 | 5 |
| PLEO | | 29 | At-large | | 47 |
| Total pledged delegates | | | | | 219 |

The 2020 Florida Democratic presidential primary took place on March 17, 2020, the third primary Tuesday of the month, as one of three states voting on the same day in the Democratic Party primaries for the 2020 presidential election, while the contest in Ohio had been postponed for roughly a month. The Florida primary was a closed primary, with the state awarding the fourth-largest amount of delegates towards the 2020 Democratic National Convention and the third-largest amount up to that point: 249 delegates, of which 219 were pledged delegates allocated on the basis of the results of the primary.

Former vice president Joe Biden was the clear winner of the Florida primary, receiving almost 62% of the vote and 162 delegates, winning every county in the state and significantly extending his delegate lead. Senator Bernie Sanders placed second with only around 23% of the vote and 57 delegates, while former mayor Michael Bloomberg, who had already withdrawn, still got 8% of the vote.

== Procedure ==
Florida was one of three states which held primaries on March 17, 2020, alongside Arizona and Illinois, while only one day before Ohio had been the first state to postpone its primary due to the COVID-19 pandemic and cancel in-person voting, accepting ballots until April 28 instead.

Voting took place throughout the state from 7:00 a.m. until 7:00 p.m. local time. In the closed primary, candidates had to meet a threshold of 15 percent at the congressional district or statewide level in order to be considered viable. The 219 pledged delegates to the 2020 Democratic National Convention were allocated proportionally on the basis of the results of the primary. Of these, between three and seven were allocated to each of the state's 27 congressional districts and another 29 were allocated to party leaders and elected officials (PLEO delegates), in addition to 47 at-large delegates. As a March primary on Stage I of the primary timetable Florida received no bonus delegates, in order to disperse the primaries between more different date clusters and keep too many states from hoarding on a March date.

Post-primary congressional district caucuses convened on May 2, 2020, to designate national convention district delegates. The state convention was subsequently held on May 30, 2020, to vote on the 47 at-large and 29 pledged PLEO delegates for the Democratic National Convention. The delegation also included 30 unpledged PLEO delegates: 16 members of the Democratic National Committee, 13 representatives from Congress (including former DNC chair Debbie Wasserman Schultz), and former DNC chair Kenneth M. Curtis.

== Candidates ==
The following candidates qualified for the ballot in Florida:

Running

- Joe Biden
- Tulsi Gabbard
- Bernie Sanders

Withdrawn

- Michael Bennet
- Michael Bloomberg (Note: Candidate withdrew after Super Tuesday when early voting had begun in a few counties.)
- Cory Booker
- Pete Buttigieg
- Julian Castro
- John Delaney
- Amy Klobuchar
- Deval Patrick
- Joe Sestak
- Tom Steyer
- Elizabeth Warren
- Marianne Williamson
- Andrew Yang

Steve Bullock and Kamala Harris withdrew so that they did not appear on the ballot.

== Polling ==
Polling Aggregation
| Source of poll aggregation | Date updated | Dates polled | Joe Biden | Bernie Sanders | Tulsi Gabbard | Other/ Undecided (Note: Calculated by taking the difference of 100% and all other candidates combined) |
|---|---|---|---|---|---|---|
| 270 to Win | Mar 17, 2020 | Mar 5–16, 2020 | 65.5% | 23.0% | 1.8% | 9.7% |
| RealClear Politics | Mar 17, 2020 | Mar 6–12, 2020 | 64.7% | 25.7% | 2.0% | 7.6% |
| FiveThirtyEight | Mar 17, 2020 | until Mar 16, 2020 (Note: FiveThirtyEight aggregates polls with a trendline regression of polls rather than a strict average of recent polls.) | 63.8% | 24.7% | 1.4% | 10.1% |
| Average | | | 64.7% | 24.5% | 1.7% | 9.1% |

Polling from February 12, 2020, to March 17, 2020
| Poll source | Date(s) administered | Sample size (Note: Key: A – all adults RV – registered voters LV – likely voters V – unclear) | Margin of error | Joe Biden | Michael Bloomberg | Pete Buttigieg | Amy Klobuchar | Bernie Sanders | Elizabeth Warren | Other | Un- decided |
|---|---|---|---|---|---|---|---|---|---|---|---|
| Swayable | Mar 16, 2020 | 4,035 (LV) | ± 2.0% | 64% | – | – | – | 25% | – | 12% (Note: Gabbard with 2%; "Other" with 10%) | – |
| AtlasIntel | Mar 14–16, 2020 | 532 (LV) | ± 4.0% | 67% | – | – | – | 27% | – | 4% (Note: Gabbard with 2%; "Other" with 2%) | 2% |
| Point Blank Political | Mar 11–13, 2020 | 3,165 (LV) | ± 2.3% | 61% (Note: In a two-person race) | – | – | – | 32% | – | – | 7% |
| Point Blank Political | Mar 11–13, 2020 | 3,165 (LV) | ± 2.3% | 57% | 2% | 2% | 0% | 29% | 4% | 1% (Note: Gabbard with 1%; Steyer with 0%) | 5% |
| Emerson College/Nexstar | Mar 11–12, 2020 | 434 (LV) | ± 4.7% | 65% | – | – | – | 27% | – | 2% (Note: Gabbard with 2%) | 6% |
| Gravis Marketing | Mar 10–12, 2020 | 516 (LV) | ± 4.3% | 66% | – | – | – | 25% | – | – | 9% |
| ROI Rocket | Mar 6–12, 2020 | 877 (LV) | ± 3.3% | 67% | – | – | – | 27% | – | – (Note: Not yet released) | – |
| Latino Decisions/Univision | Mar 6–12, 2020 | 531 (LV) | ± 4.3% | 67% | – | – | – | 32% | – | – | 2% |
| Latino Decisions/Univision | Mar 6–12, 2020 | 531 (LV) | ± 4.3% | 63% | – | – | – | 25% | – | 8% (Note: Gabbard with 2%; "Other" with 6%) | 4% |
| University of North Florida | Mar 5–10, 2020 | 1,502 (LV) | ± 2.5% | 66% | 2% | 1% | <1% | 22% | 2% | 1% (Note: Gabbard with 1%; Yang with <1%) | 7% |
| St Pete Polls/FloridaPolitics.com | Mar 6–8, 2020 | 2,480 (LV) | ± 2.0% | 69% | 5% | 2% | 1% | 14% | 1% | 0% (Note: Steyer with 0%) | 9% |
| Point Blank Political | Mar 6–8, 2020 | 3,376 (LV) | ± 2.3% | 61% | – | – | – | 32% | – | – | 7% |
| Point Blank Political | Mar 6–8, 2020 | 3,376 (LV) | ± 2.3% | 55% | 2% | 2% | 1% | 29% | 4% | 2% (Note: Gabbard and Steyer with 1%) | 7% |
| Florida Atlantic University | Mar 5–7, 2020 | 399 (LV) | ± 4.9% | 61% | – | – | – | 25% | – | 3% (Note: Gabbard with 3%) | 10% |
| | Mar 4–5, 2020 | Bloomberg and Warren withdraw from the race | | | | | | | | | |
| St Pete Polls/FloridaPolitics.com | Mar 4, 2020 | 1,882 (LV) | ± 2.3% | 61% | 14% | 1% | 1% | 12% | 5% | 0% (Note: Steyer with 0%) | 6% |
| | Mar 1–2, 2020 | Buttigieg and Klobuchar withdraw from the race | | | | | | | | | |
| St Pete Polls | Feb 25–26, 2020 | 2,788 (LV) | ± 1.9% | 34% | 25% | 8% | 4% | 13% | 5% | 1% (Note: Steyer with 1%) | 10% |
| Saint Leo University | Feb 17–22, 2020 | 342 (LV) | – | 25% | 25% | 11% | 5% | 17% | 7% | 4% (Note: Gabbard with 2%; Steyer with 1%; "None of these" with 1%) | 7% |
| Florida Southern College | Feb 17–21, 2020 | 313 (LV) | ± 5.54% | 22% | 23% | 9% | 5% | 18% | 12% | 1% (Note: Gabbard and Steyer with 0%; "Other" with 1%) | 9% |
| St Pete Polls | Feb 18–19, 2020 | 2,412 (LV) | ± 2.0% | 27% | 32% | 8% | 7% | 11% | 5% | 2% (Note: Steyer with 2%) | 10% |
| Tel Opinion Research/Politico/ Let’s Preserve the American Dream | Feb 13–18, 2020 | 800 (LV) | ± 3.46% | 20% | 26% | 8% | 5% | 13% | 7% | 5% (Note: Steyer with 2%; Gabbard, Bennet, and Yang with 1%) | 16% |
| St Pete Polls | Feb 12–13, 2020 | 3,047 (LV) | ± 1.8% | 26% | 27% | 11% | 9% | 10% | 5% | 1% (Note: Steyer with 1%) | 11% |

Polling before February 11, 2020
| Poll source | Date(s) administered | Sample size | Margin of error | Joe Biden | Michael Bloomberg | Cory Booker | Pete Buttigieg | Kamala Harris | Amy Klobuchar | Beto O'Rourke | Bernie Sanders | Elizabeth Warren | Andrew Yang | Other | Un- decided |
|---|---|---|---|---|---|---|---|---|---|---|---|---|---|---|---|
| | Feb 11, 2020 | New Hampshire primary; Yang withdraws from the race after close of polls | | | | | | | | | | | | | |
| St. Pete Polls | Jan 27–28, 2020 | 2,590 (LV) | ± 1.9% | 41% | 17% | – | 6% | – | 5% | – | 9% | 7% | 2% | 2% (Note: Steyer with 2%) | 10% |
| Tel Opinion Research/Let’s Preserve the American Dream/Politico | Jan 21–23, 2020 | 600 (LV) | ± 4% | 41% (Note: If only Biden, Sanders and Warren remained as candidates) | – | – | – | – | – | – | 21% | 18% | – | – | 20% |
| Tel Opinion Research/Let’s Preserve the American Dream/Politico | Jan 21–23, 2020 | 600 (LV) | ± 4% | 29% | 4% | – | 4% | – | 4% | – | 17% | 12% | 2% | 2% (Note: Steyer with 2%) | 28% |
| | Jan 13, 2020 | Booker withdraws from the race | | | | | | | | | | | | | |
| Florida Atlantic University | Jan 9–12, 2020 | 494 | ± 4.4% | 42% | 7% | 3% | 3% | – | 6% | – | 16% | 10% | 5% | 5% (Note: Steyer with 2%; Bennet, Delaney, and Gabbard 1%; Patrick with 0%) | 4% (Note: Listed as "someone else/unsure") |
| | Dec 3, 2019 | Harris withdraws from the race | | | | | | | | | | | | | |
| | Nov 24, 2019 | Bloomberg announces his candidacy | | | | | | | | | | | | | |
| | Nov 1, 2019 | O'Rourke withdraws from the race | | | | | | | | | | | | | |
| Siena College/New York Times | Oct 13–26, 2019 | 650 (RV) | ± 4.4% | 27% | – | 0% | 5% | 1% | 2% | 0% | 13% | 19% | 0% | 1% (Note: Gabbard with 1%; others with 0%) | 29% |
| Tel Opinion Research | Sep 15–18, 2019 | 800 (LV) | ± 3.54% | 43% | – | – | – | – | – | – | 10% | 26% | – | – | 18% |
| Tel Opinion Research | Sep 15–18, 2019 | 800 (LV) | ± 3.54% | 37% | – | – | 5% | 6% | – | – | 9% | 18% | 2% | – | 20% |
| Tel Opinion Research | Sep 15–18, 2019 | 800 (LV) | ± 3.54% | 24% | – | – | 2% | 3% | – | – | 5% | 11% | 1% | 3% (Note: Listed as others) | 49% |
| Florida Atlantic University | Sep 12–15, 2019 | 407 | ± 4.9% | 34% | – | 1% | 5% | 4% | 0% | 2% | 14% | 24% | 2% | 8% (Note: Messam with 3%; Bennet, de Blasio, Bullock, Gabbard and Ryan with 1%; Castro, Delaney, Sestak, Steyer and Williamson with 0%) | 6% |
| St. Pete Polls | Jun 22–23, 2019 | 2,022 | ± 2.2% | 47% | – | 3% | 8% | 6% | – | 2% | 8% | 12% | – | 7% | 6% |
| Change Research | Jun 16–17, 2019 | 1,130 | ± 2.9% | 33% | – | 2% | 15% | 7% | 2% | 3% | 20% | 15% | 3% | 2% (Note: Castro and Messam with 1%; Bennet, Delaney, Gabbard, Gillibrand, Gravel, Hickenlooper, Moulton, Ryan, and Williamson with 0%) | – |
| Quinnipiac University | Jun 12–17, 2019 | 417 | ± 5.8% | 41% | – | 1% | 8% | 6% | 1% | 1% | 14% | 12% | <1% | 1% (Note: Bennet, Bullock, Castro, de Blasio, Delaney, Gabbard, Gillibrand, Gravel, Hickenlooper, Inslee, Messam, Moulton, Ryan, Swalwell, and Williamson with <1%; others with 1%) | 12% |
| Climate Nexus | Jun 7–11, 2019 | 676 | ± 2.6% | 32% | – | 2% | 6% | 6% | 1% | 2% | 16% | 10% | 2% | 9% (Note: Delaney with 2%; Bennet, de Blasio, Hickenlooper, Inslee, Ryan, and Swalwell with 1%; Bullock, Castro, Gabbard, Gillibrand, Gravel, Messam, Moulton, and Williamson with 0%) | 14% |
| Zogby Analytics | May 23–29, 2019 | 228 | ± 6.5% | 34% | – | 2% | 6% | 2% | 1% | 4% | 18% | 7% | 1% | 6% (Note: Gabbard and Gillibrand with 2%; Castro, and Inslee with 1%; Delaney and Hickenlooper with 0%) | – |
| Florida Atlantic University | May 16–19, 2019 | 403 | ± 4.9% | 39% | – | 1% | 9% | 7% | 1% | 5% | 12% | 12% | 1% | 14% (Note: Castro with 2%; Gillibrand, Gravel, and Moulton with 1%; Delaney, Gabbard, Hickenlooper, Inslee, Messam, Ryan, Swalwell, and Williamson with 0%; others with 9%) | – |
| Tel Opinion Research* | May 8, 2019 | 800 | ± 3.5% | 39% | – | 1% | 3% | 5% | 1% | 1% | 16% | 5% | – | – | 28% |
| | Apr 25, 2019 | Biden announces his candidacy | | | | | | | | | | | | | |
| | Apr 14, 2019 | Buttigieg announces his candidacy | | | | | | | | | | | | | |
| Tel Opinion Research* | Mar 21, 2019 | 800 | ± 3.5% | 37% | – | 2% | – | 4% | 1% | 5% | 13% | 6% | – | – | 31% |
| | Mar 14, 2019 | O'Rourke announces his candidacy | | | | | | | | | | | | | |
| Bendixen & Amandi International | Mar 1–4, 2019 | 300 | – | 26% | 1% | 1% | 0% | 9% | 1% | 1% | 11% | 4% | 0% | 0% (Note: Brown, Castro, Delaney, Gillibrand, Gabbard, Hickenlooper, and Inslee with 0%) | 46% |
| | Feb 19, 2019 | Sanders announces his candidacy | | | | | | | | | | | | | |
| | Feb 9, 2019 | Warren announces her candidacy | | | | | | | | | | | | | |
| | Feb 1, 2019 | Booker announces his candidacy | | | | | | | | | | | | | |
| | Jan 21, 2019 | Harris announces her candidacy | | | | | | | | | | | | | |
| Saint Leo University | May 25–31, 2018 | – | – | 21% | – | 3% | – | 4% | – | – | 11% | 7% | – | 34% (Note: Winfrey with 17%; Holder with 5%; Brown with 3%; Cuomo, Gillibrand, and Murphy with 2%; Bullock, Landrieu, Patrick, and McAuliffe with 1%; others with 2%) | 17% |

== Results ==
Popular vote share by county Biden—40–50% Biden—50–60% Biden—60–70% Biden—70–80% Biden—80–90%

2020 Florida Democratic presidential primary
| Candidate | Votes | % | Delegates |
|---|---|---|---|
| Joe Biden | 1,077,375 | 61.95 | 162 |
| Bernie Sanders | 397,311 | 22.84 | 57 |
| Michael Bloomberg (withdrawn) | 146,544 | 8.43 | |
| Pete Buttigieg (withdrawn) | 39,886 | 2.29 | |
| Elizabeth Warren (withdrawn) | 32,875 | 1.89 | |
| Amy Klobuchar (withdrawn) | 17,276 | 0.99 | |
| Tulsi Gabbard | 8,712 | 0.50 | |
| Andrew Yang (withdrawn) | 5,286 | 0.30 | |
| Michael Bennet (withdrawn) | 4,244 | 0.24 | |
| Tom Steyer (withdrawn) | 2,510 | 0.14 | |
| Marianne Williamson (withdrawn) | 1,744 | 0.10 | |
| John Delaney (withdrawn) | 1,583 | 0.09 | |
| Cory Booker (withdrawn) | 1,507 | 0.09 | |
| Julián Castro (withdrawn) | 1,036 | 0.06 | |
| Joe Sestak (withdrawn) | 664 | 0.04 | |
| Deval Patrick (withdrawn) | 661 | 0.04 | |
| Total | 1,739,214 | 100% | 219 |

=== Results by county ===
2020 Florida Democratic primary (results per county)
| County | Joe Biden | | Bernie Sanders | | Michael Bloomberg | | Pete Buttigieg | | Elizabeth Warren | | Amy Klobuchar | | Tulsi Gabbard | | Andrew Yang | | Michael Bennet | | Tom Steyer | | Marianne Williamson | | John Delaney | | Cory Booker | | Julián Castro | | Joe Sestak | | Deval Patrick | | Total votes cast |
| County | Votes | % | Votes | % | Votes | % | Votes | % | Votes | % | Votes | % | Votes | % | Votes | % | Votes | % | Votes | % | Votes | % | Votes | % | Votes | % | Votes | % | Votes | % | Votes | % | Total votes cast |
|---|---|---|---|---|---|---|---|---|---|---|---|---|---|---|---|---|---|---|---|---|---|---|---|---|---|---|---|---|---|---|---|---|---|
| Alachua | 19,077 | 51.16 | 14,903 | 39.97 | 841 | 2.26 | 587 | 1.57 | 920 | 2.47 | 317 | 0.85 | 260 | 0.70 | 141 | 0.38 | 43 | 0.12 | 74 | 0.20 | 35 | 0.09 | 23 | 0.06 | 27 | 0.07 | 15 | 0.04 | 12 | 0.03 | 11 | 0.03 | 37,286 |
| Baker | 593 | 64.18 | 150 | 16.23 | 50 | 5.41 | 14 | 1.52 | 14 | 1.52 | 15 | 1.62 | 15 | 1.62 | 16 | 1.73 | 16 | 1.73 | 7 | 0.76 | 11 | 1.19 | 14 | 1.52 | 3 | 0.32 | 3 | 0.32 | 1 | 0.11 | 2 | 0.22 | 924 |
| Bay | 5,184 | 66.30 | 1,776 | 22.71 | 265 | 3.39 | 169 | 2.16 | 133 | 1.70 | 90 | 1.15 | 62 | 0.79 | 44 | 0.56 | 21 | 0.27 | 22 | 0.28 | 11 | 0.14 | 7 | 0.09 | 9 | 0.12 | 7 | 0.09 | 10 | 0.13 | 9 | 0.12 | 7,819 |
| Bradford | 952 | 61.54 | 250 | 16.16 | 153 | 9.89 | 28 | 1.81 | 27 | 1.75 | 23 | 1.49 | 24 | 1.55 | 24 | 1.55 | 9 | 0.58 | 7 | 0.45 | 9 | 0.58 | 18 | 1.16 | 12 | 0.78 | 5 | 0.32 | 3 | 0.19 | 3 | 0.19 | 1,547 |
| Brevard | 33,012 | 60.25 | 13,190 | 24.07 | 4,412 | 8.05 | 1,306 | 2.38 | 1,276 | 2.33 | 650 | 1.19 | 388 | 0.71 | 173 | 0.32 | 110 | 0.20 | 82 | 0.15 | 63 | 0.11 | 33 | 0.06 | 41 | 0.07 | 14 | 0.03 | 23 | 0.04 | 23 | 0.04 | 54,796 |
| Broward | 122,637 | 67.33 | 35,981 | 19.75 | 14,608 | 8.02 | 3,564 | 1.96 | 2,291 | 1.26 | 1,139 | 0.63 | 628 | 0.34 | 408 | 0.22 | 309 | 0.17 | 147 | 0.08 | 118 | 0.06 | 63 | 0.03 | 114 | 0.06 | 77 | 0.04 | 37 | 0.02 | 33 | 0.02 | 182,154 |
| Calhoun | 389 | 59.03 | 107 | 16.24 | 34 | 5.16 | 15 | 2.28 | 22 | 3.34 | 18 | 2.73 | 10 | 1.52 | 16 | 2.43 | 8 | 1.21 | 16 | 2.43 | 10 | 1.52 | 7 | 1.06 | 3 | 0.46 | 1 | 0.15 | 1 | 0.15 | 2 | 0.30 | 659 |
| Charlotte | 9,080 | 61.07 | 2,565 | 17.25 | 1,804 | 12.13 | 623 | 4.19 | 317 | 2.13 | 266 | 1.79 | 56 | 0.38 | 39 | 0.26 | 21 | 0.14 | 40 | 0.27 | 21 | 0.14 | 12 | 0.08 | 9 | 0.06 | 2 | 0.01 | 3 | 0.02 | 10 | 0.07 | 14,868 |
| Citrus | 6,951 | 60.41 | 2,132 | 18.53 | 1,292 | 11.23 | 362 | 3.15 | 260 | 2.26 | 229 | 1.99 | 91 | 0.79 | 36 | 0.31 | 38 | 0.33 | 41 | 0.36 | 23 | 0.20 | 14 | 0.12 | 12 | 0.10 | 6 | 0.05 | 10 | 0.09 | 9 | 0.08 | 11,506 |
| Clay | 6,714 | 61.44 | 2,789 | 25.52 | 648 | 5.93 | 223 | 2.04 | 237 | 2.17 | 119 | 1.09 | 67 | 0.61 | 33 | 0.30 | 28 | 0.26 | 16 | 0.15 | 8 | 0.07 | 27 | 0.25 | 13 | 0.12 | 2 | 0.02 | 3 | 0.03 | 1 | 0.01 | 10,928 |
| Collier | 15,573 | 65.92 | 3,753 | 15.89 | 2,525 | 10.69 | 814 | 3.45 | 370 | 1.57 | 314 | 1.33 | 75 | 0.32 | 42 | 0.18 | 54 | 0.23 | 25 | 0.11 | 25 | 0.11 | 12 | 0.05 | 16 | 0.07 | 15 | 0.06 | 5 | 0.02 | 6 | 0.03 | 23,624 |
| Columbia | 2,292 | 64.58 | 655 | 18.46 | 255 | 7.19 | 57 | 1.61 | 61 | 1.72 | 47 | 1.32 | 62 | 1.75 | 35 | 0.99 | 16 | 0.45 | 22 | 0.62 | 9 | 0.25 | 19 | 0.54 | 5 | 0.14 | 5 | 0.14 | 5 | 0.14 | 4 | 0.11 | 3,549 |
| DeSoto | 863 | 65.28 | 242 | 18.31 | 85 | 6.43 | 19 | 1.44 | 36 | 2.72 | 10 | 0.76 | 10 | 0.76 | 16 | 1.21 | 9 | 0.68 | 7 | 0.53 | 5 | 0.38 | 10 | 0.76 | 4 | 0.30 | 2 | 0.15 | 0 | 0.00 | 4 | 0.30 | 1,322 |
| Dixie | 338 | 57.58 | 104 | 17.72 | 40 | 6.81 | 11 | 1.87 | 25 | 4.26 | 17 | 2.90 | 6 | 1.02 | 13 | 2.21 | 12 | 2.04 | 4 | 0.68 | 4 | 0.68 | 7 | 1.19 | 3 | 0.51 | 2 | 0.34 | 1 | 0.17 | 0 | 0.00 | 587 |
| Duval | 56,227 | 66.39 | 19,930 | 23.53 | 4,453 | 5.26 | 896 | 1.06 | 1,336 | 1.58 | 383 | 0.45 | 363 | 0.43 | 239 | 0.28 | 213 | 0.25 | 97 | 0.11 | 69 | 0.08 | 317 | 0.37 | 85 | 0.10 | 34 | 0.04 | 28 | 0.03 | 28 | 0.03 | 84,698 |
| Escambia | 17,036 | 66.71 | 5,450 | 21.34 | 1,200 | 4.70 | 585 | 2.29 | 428 | 1.68 | 283 | 1.11 | 209 | 0.82 | 97 | 0.38 | 56 | 0.22 | 85 | 0.33 | 23 | 0.09 | 24 | 0.09 | 33 | 0.13 | 9 | 0.04 | 8 | 0.03 | 11 | 0.04 | 25,537 |
| Flagler | 7,520 | 68.89 | 1,917 | 17.56 | 881 | 8.07 | 229 | 2.10 | 157 | 1.44 | 95 | 0.87 | 43 | 0.39 | 16 | 0.15 | 20 | 0.18 | 10 | 0.09 | 9 | 0.08 | 4 | 0.04 | 6 | 0.05 | 5 | 0.05 | 3 | 0.03 | 1 | 0.01 | 10,916 |
| Franklin | 764 | 64.20 | 214 | 17.98 | 50 | 4.20 | 32 | 2.69 | 27 | 2.27 | 14 | 1.18 | 35 | 2.94 | 22 | 1.85 | 9 | 0.76 | 6 | 0.50 | 5 | 0.42 | 5 | 0.42 | 5 | 0.42 | 1 | 0.08 | 1 | 0.08 | 0 | 0.00 | 1,190 |
| Gadsden | 6,446 | 80.47 | 875 | 10.92 | 382 | 4.77 | 44 | 0.55 | 52 | 0.65 | 40 | 0.50 | 48 | 0.60 | 21 | 0.26 | 37 | 0.46 | 15 | 0.19 | 15 | 0.19 | 10 | 0.12 | 10 | 0.12 | 4 | 0.05 | 2 | 0.02 | 9 | 0.11 | 8,010 |
| Gilchrist | 415 | 58.53 | 149 | 21.02 | 31 | 4.37 | 19 | 2.68 | 20 | 2.82 | 22 | 3.10 | 15 | 2.12 | 12 | 1.69 | 6 | 0.85 | 5 | 0.71 | 6 | 0.85 | 3 | 0.42 | 2 | 0.28 | 2 | 0.28 | 1 | 0.14 | 1 | 0.14 | 709 |
| Glades | 383 | 64.05 | 99 | 16.56 | 37 | 6.19 | 16 | 2.68 | 11 | 1.84 | 14 | 2.34 | 4 | 0.67 | 8 | 1.34 | 5 | 0.84 | 7 | 1.17 | 5 | 0.84 | 2 | 0.33 | 4 | 0.67 | 2 | 0.33 | 0 | 0.00 | 1 | 0.17 | 598 |
| Gulf | 665 | 71.81 | 125 | 13.50 | 33 | 3.56 | 17 | 1.84 | 20 | 2.16 | 10 | 1.08 | 10 | 1.08 | 8 | 0.86 | 7 | 0.76 | 7 | 0.76 | 5 | 0.54 | 7 | 0.76 | 5 | 0.54 | 2 | 0.22 | 1 | 0.11 | 4 | 0.43 | 926 |
| Hamilton | 678 | 72.75 | 123 | 13.20 | 37 | 3.97 | 10 | 1.07 | 8 | 0.86 | 18 | 1.93 | 19 | 2.04 | 10 | 1.07 | 9 | 0.97 | 7 | 0.75 | 5 | 0.54 | 1 | 0.11 | 1 | 0.11 | 1 | 0.11 | 2 | 0.21 | 3 | 0.32 | 932 |
| Hardee | 493 | 68.19 | 142 | 19.64 | 35 | 4.84 | 7 | 0.97 | 7 | 0.97 | 8 | 1.11 | 8 | 1.11 | 2 | 0.28 | 10 | 1.38 | 0 | 0.00 | 2 | 0.28 | 2 | 0.28 | 3 | 0.41 | 3 | 0.41 | 0 | 0.00 | 1 | 0.14 | 723 |
| Hendry | 953 | 65.32 | 286 | 19.60 | 102 | 6.99 | 22 | 1.51 | 22 | 1.51 | 12 | 0.82 | 9 | 0.62 | 8 | 0.55 | 13 | 0.89 | 4 | 0.27 | 2 | 0.14 | 7 | 0.48 | 8 | 0.55 | 10 | 0.69 | 1 | 0.07 | 0 | 0.00 | 1,459 |
| Hernando | 8,240 | 55.73 | 3,199 | 21.64 | 1,923 | 13.01 | 511 | 3.46 | 313 | 2.12 | 230 | 1.56 | 98 | 0.66 | 83 | 0.56 | 47 | 0.32 | 47 | 0.32 | 19 | 0.13 | 22 | 0.15 | 19 | 0.13 | 9 | 0.06 | 14 | 0.09 | 12 | 0.08 | 14,786 |
| Highlands | 3,569 | 62.88 | 931 | 16.40 | 649 | 11.43 | 176 | 3.10 | 94 | 1.66 | 70 | 1.23 | 47 | 0.83 | 38 | 0.67 | 22 | 0.39 | 19 | 0.33 | 9 | 0.16 | 17 | 0.30 | 17 | 0.30 | 4 | 0.07 | 7 | 0.12 | 7 | 0.12 | 5,676 |
| Hillsborough | 67,791 | 55.34 | 32,734 | 26.72 | 11,665 | 9.52 | 3,443 | 2.81 | 3,324 | 2.71 | 1,302 | 1.06 | 688 | 0.56 | 465 | 0.38 | 352 | 0.29 | 203 | 0.17 | 118 | 0.10 | 66 | 0.05 | 97 | 0.08 | 141 | 0.12 | 49 | 0.04 | 61 | 0.05 | 122,499 |
| Holmes | 263 | 48.88 | 116 | 21.56 | 30 | 5.58 | 10 | 1.86 | 18 | 3.35 | 19 | 3.53 | 18 | 3.35 | 12 | 2.23 | 15 | 2.79 | 7 | 1.30 | 12 | 2.23 | 12 | 2.23 | 1 | 0.19 | 0 | 0.00 | 1 | 0.19 | 4 | 0.74 | 538 |
| Indian River | 9,079 | 66.48 | 2,326 | 17.03 | 1,330 | 9.74 | 362 | 2.65 | 216 | 1.58 | 189 | 1.38 | 60 | 0.44 | 25 | 0.18 | 18 | 0.13 | 16 | 0.12 | 12 | 0.09 | 8 | 0.06 | 6 | 0.04 | 3 | 0.02 | 4 | 0.03 | 3 | 0.02 | 13,657 |
| Jackson | 2,437 | 70.35 | 462 | 13.34 | 145 | 4.19 | 44 | 1.27 | 62 | 1.79 | 64 | 1.85 | 58 | 1.67 | 47 | 1.36 | 23 | 0.66 | 28 | 0.81 | 26 | 0.75 | 25 | 0.72 | 14 | 0.40 | 6 | 0.17 | 12 | 0.35 | 11 | 0.32 | 3,464 |
| Jefferson | 1,551 | 76.03 | 276 | 13.53 | 98 | 4.80 | 13 | 0.64 | 21 | 1.03 | 18 | 0.88 | 12 | 0.59 | 9 | 0.44 | 13 | 0.64 | 8 | 0.39 | 4 | 0.20 | 7 | 0.34 | 6 | 0.29 | 2 | 0.10 | 2 | 0.10 | 0 | 0.00 | 2,040 |
| Lafayette | 173 | 51.34 | 58 | 17.21 | 24 | 7.12 | 4 | 1.19 | 16 | 4.75 | 8 | 2.37 | 13 | 3.86 | 11 | 3.26 | 9 | 2.67 | 7 | 2.08 | 3 | 0.89 | 1 | 0.30 | 6 | 1.78 | 1 | 0.30 | 2 | 0.59 | 1 | 0.30 | 337 |
| Lake | 18,574 | 69.29 | 5,591 | 20.86 | 1,284 | 4.79 | 457 | 1.70 | 367 | 1.37 | 171 | 0.64 | 127 | 0.47 | 65 | 0.24 | 47 | 0.18 | 26 | 0.10 | 33 | 0.12 | 11 | 0.04 | 25 | 0.09 | 10 | 0.04 | 10 | 0.04 | 8 | 0.03 | 26,806 |
| Lee | 28,192 | 57.04 | 9,769 | 19.77 | 6,544 | 13.24 | 2,109 | 4.27 | 1,135 | 2.30 | 961 | 1.94 | 217 | 0.44 | 132 | 0.27 | 98 | 0.20 | 90 | 0.18 | 45 | 0.09 | 32 | 0.06 | 41 | 0.08 | 27 | 0.05 | 16 | 0.03 | 13 | 0.03 | 49,421 |
| Leon | 28,946 | 62.03 | 13,656 | 29.26 | 1,671 | 3.58 | 457 | 0.98 | 850 | 1.82 | 304 | 0.65 | 305 | 0.65 | 169 | 0.36 | 68 | 0.15 | 52 | 0.11 | 63 | 0.14 | 33 | 0.07 | 42 | 0.09 | 20 | 0.04 | 15 | 0.03 | 15 | 0.03 | 46,666 |
| Levy | 1,497 | 59.71 | 516 | 20.58 | 159 | 6.34 | 83 | 3.31 | 71 | 2.83 | 51 | 2.03 | 33 | 1.32 | 23 | 0.92 | 18 | 0.72 | 20 | 0.80 | 5 | 0.20 | 11 | 0.44 | 9 | 0.36 | 3 | 0.12 | 4 | 0.16 | 4 | 0.16 | 2,507 |
| Liberty | 306 | 63.35 | 68 | 14.08 | 17 | 3.52 | 4 | 0.83 | 11 | 2.28 | 8 | 1.66 | 22 | 4.55 | 7 | 1.45 | 5 | 1.04 | 6 | 1.24 | 5 | 1.04 | 11 | 2.28 | 6 | 1.24 | 1 | 0.21 | 1 | 0.21 | 5 | 1.04 | 483 |
| Madison | 1,467 | 73.31 | 234 | 11.69 | 109 | 5.45 | 16 | 0.80 | 38 | 1.90 | 30 | 1.50 | 16 | 0.80 | 26 | 1.30 | 19 | 0.95 | 7 | 0.35 | 11 | 0.55 | 9 | 0.45 | 9 | 0.45 | 3 | 0.15 | 5 | 0.25 | 2 | 0.10 | 2,001 |
| Manatee | 21,036 | 61.93 | 6,430 | 18.93 | 3,493 | 10.28 | 1,181 | 3.48 | 711 | 2.09 | 620 | 1.83 | 141 | 0.42 | 79 | 0.23 | 126 | 0.37 | 58 | 0.17 | 28 | 0.08 | 14 | 0.04 | 18 | 0.05 | 9 | 0.03 | 14 | 0.04 | 8 | 0.02 | 33,966 |
| Marion | 18,372 | 66.95 | 4,632 | 16.88 | 2,426 | 8.84 | 649 | 2.37 | 430 | 1.57 | 415 | 1.51 | 169 | 0.62 | 103 | 0.38 | 70 | 0.26 | 50 | 0.18 | 34 | 0.12 | 20 | 0.07 | 28 | 0.10 | 17 | 0.06 | 13 | 0.05 | 12 | 0.04 | 27,440 |
| Martin | 8,166 | 63.99 | 2,364 | 18.52 | 1,322 | 10.36 | 354 | 2.77 | 207 | 1.62 | 177 | 1.39 | 65 | 0.51 | 22 | 0.17 | 34 | 0.27 | 13 | 0.10 | 16 | 0.13 | 5 | 0.04 | 5 | 0.04 | 3 | 0.02 | 4 | 0.03 | 5 | 0.04 | 12,762 |
| Miami-Dade | 94,793 | 61.34 | 34,829 | 22.54 | 17,330 | 11.21 | 2,257 | 1.46 | 2,743 | 1.77 | 720 | 0.47 | 441 | 0.29 | 282 | 0.18 | 551 | 0.36 | 93 | 0.06 | 99 | 0.06 | 67 | 0.04 | 108 | 0.07 | 154 | 0.10 | 38 | 0.02 | 39 | 0.03 | 154,544 |
| Monroe | 5,206 | 60.64 | 1,991 | 23.19 | 674 | 7.85 | 258 | 3.01 | 215 | 2.50 | 93 | 1.08 | 53 | 0.62 | 30 | 0.35 | 22 | 0.26 | 14 | 0.16 | 10 | 0.12 | 3 | 0.03 | 2 | 0.02 | 4 | 0.05 | 6 | 0.07 | 4 | 0.05 | 8,585 |
| Nassau | 3,816 | 65.36 | 1,073 | 18.38 | 436 | 7.47 | 145 | 2.48 | 115 | 1.97 | 88 | 1.51 | 41 | 0.70 | 26 | 0.45 | 18 | 0.31 | 11 | 0.19 | 6 | 0.10 | 44 | 0.75 | 6 | 0.10 | 3 | 0.05 | 6 | 0.10 | 4 | 0.07 | 5,838 |
| Okaloosa | 5,572 | 61.23 | 2,434 | 26.75 | 321 | 3.53 | 216 | 2.37 | 235 | 2.58 | 88 | 0.97 | 84 | 0.92 | 41 | 0.45 | 28 | 0.31 | 26 | 0.29 | 14 | 0.15 | 13 | 0.14 | 12 | 0.13 | 5 | 0.05 | 3 | 0.03 | 8 | 0.09 | 9,100 |
| Okeechobee | 1,034 | 66.28 | 274 | 17.56 | 126 | 8.08 | 29 | 1.86 | 32 | 2.05 | 13 | 0.83 | 14 | 0.90 | 12 | 0.77 | 9 | 0.58 | 4 | 0.26 | 5 | 0.32 | 5 | 0.32 | 0 | 0.00 | 0 | 0.00 | 2 | 0.13 | 1 | 0.06 | 1,560 |
| Orange | 64,901 | 57.48 | 36,720 | 32.52 | 5,623 | 4.98 | 1,769 | 1.57 | 2,141 | 1.90 | 514 | 0.46 | 388 | 0.34 | 275 | 0.24 | 214 | 0.19 | 74 | 0.07 | 49 | 0.04 | 33 | 0.03 | 94 | 0.08 | 63 | 0.06 | 24 | 0.02 | 29 | 0.03 | 112,911 |
| Osceola | 13,508 | 50.69 | 7,697 | 28.89 | 3,464 | 13.00 | 623 | 2.34 | 580 | 2.18 | 239 | 0.90 | 119 | 0.45 | 101 | 0.38 | 130 | 0.49 | 32 | 0.12 | 22 | 0.08 | 20 | 0.08 | 26 | 0.10 | 53 | 0.20 | 19 | 0.07 | 13 | 0.05 | 26,646 |
| Palm Beach | 104,788 | 69.64 | 23,995 | 15.95 | 14,236 | 9.46 | 2,803 | 1.86 | 1,712 | 1.14 | 1,219 | 0.81 | 553 | 0.37 | 303 | 0.20 | 298 | 0.20 | 142 | 0.09 | 93 | 0.06 | 56 | 0.04 | 116 | 0.08 | 73 | 0.05 | 34 | 0.02 | 44 | 0.03 | 150,465 |
| Pasco | 22,206 | 56.77 | 9,752 | 24.93 | 3,799 | 9.71 | 1,282 | 3.28 | 864 | 2.21 | 495 | 1.27 | 219 | 0.56 | 148 | 0.38 | 86 | 0.22 | 72 | 0.18 | 58 | 0.15 | 39 | 0.10 | 29 | 0.07 | 26 | 0.07 | 21 | 0.05 | 17 | 0.04 | 39,113 |
| Pinellas | 61,288 | 55.62 | 27,972 | 25.38 | 10,971 | 9.96 | 3,674 | 3.33 | 2,945 | 2.67 | 1,498 | 1.36 | 672 | 0.61 | 385 | 0.35 | 211 | 0.19 | 146 | 0.13 | 134 | 0.12 | 60 | 0.05 | 99 | 0.09 | 50 | 0.05 | 49 | 0.04 | 44 | 0.04 | 110,198 |
| Polk | 27,129 | 61.13 | 10,084 | 22.72 | 3,861 | 8.70 | 970 | 2.19 | 898 | 2.02 | 539 | 1.21 | 239 | 0.54 | 152 | 0.34 | 140 | 0.32 | 100 | 0.23 | 76 | 0.17 | 64 | 0.14 | 48 | 0.11 | 34 | 0.08 | 27 | 0.06 | 21 | 0.05 | 44,382 |
| Putnam | 2,764 | 64.67 | 868 | 20.31 | 244 | 5.71 | 62 | 1.45 | 85 | 1.99 | 55 | 1.29 | 59 | 1.38 | 38 | 0.89 | 21 | 0.49 | 17 | 0.40 | 13 | 0.30 | 35 | 0.82 | 8 | 0.19 | 1 | 0.02 | 2 | 0.05 | 2 | 0.05 | 4,274 |
| Santa Rosa | 4,776 | 59.71 | 2,173 | 27.17 | 372 | 4.65 | 224 | 2.80 | 176 | 2.20 | 98 | 1.23 | 63 | 0.79 | 41 | 0.51 | 12 | 0.15 | 32 | 0.40 | 10 | 0.13 | 3 | 0.04 | 7 | 0.09 | 3 | 0.04 | 4 | 0.05 | 5 | 0.06 | 7,999 |
| Sarasota | 31,605 | 61.95 | 9,548 | 18.71 | 5,524 | 10.83 | 1,802 | 3.53 | 1,105 | 2.17 | 867 | 1.70 | 183 | 0.36 | 95 | 0.19 | 90 | 0.18 | 85 | 0.17 | 36 | 0.07 | 20 | 0.04 | 24 | 0.05 | 11 | 0.02 | 10 | 0.02 | 15 | 0.03 | 51,020 |
| Seminole | 23,579 | 57.61 | 13,166 | 32.17 | 1,973 | 4.82 | 705 | 1.72 | 746 | 1.82 | 305 | 0.75 | 194 | 0.47 | 101 | 0.25 | 52 | 0.13 | 36 | 0.09 | 16 | 0.04 | 11 | 0.03 | 22 | 0.05 | 9 | 0.02 | 12 | 0.03 | 3 | 0.01 | 40,930 |
| St. Johns | 14,331 | 63.76 | 5,240 | 23.31 | 1,308 | 5.82 | 575 | 2.56 | 489 | 2.18 | 216 | 0.96 | 118 | 0.52 | 66 | 0.29 | 40 | 0.18 | 18 | 0.08 | 17 | 0.08 | 27 | 0.12 | 12 | 0.05 | 8 | 0.04 | 6 | 0.03 | 6 | 0.03 | 22,477 |
| St. Lucie | 18,800 | 67.50 | 5,092 | 18.28 | 2,286 | 8.21 | 605 | 2.17 | 382 | 1.37 | 285 | 1.02 | 122 | 0.44 | 82 | 0.29 | 52 | 0.19 | 35 | 0.13 | 23 | 0.08 | 23 | 0.08 | 29 | 0.10 | 15 | 0.05 | 9 | 0.03 | 13 | 0.05 | 27,853 |
| Sumter | 9,374 | 69.39 | 1,231 | 9.11 | 1,616 | 11.96 | 562 | 4.16 | 253 | 1.87 | 295 | 2.18 | 64 | 0.47 | 32 | 0.24 | 25 | 0.19 | 16 | 0.12 | 15 | 0.11 | 10 | 0.07 | 7 | 0.05 | 2 | 0.01 | 3 | 0.02 | 5 | 0.04 | 13,510 |
| Suwannee | 1,291 | 60.47 | 382 | 17.89 | 145 | 6.79 | 41 | 1.92 | 60 | 2.81 | 54 | 2.53 | 58 | 2.72 | 37 | 1.73 | 17 | 0.80 | 12 | 0.56 | 3 | 0.14 | 16 | 0.75 | 8 | 0.37 | 2 | 0.09 | 4 | 0.19 | 5 | 0.23 | 2,135 |
| Taylor | 856 | 61.06 | 197 | 14.05 | 154 | 10.98 | 29 | 2.07 | 25 | 1.78 | 26 | 1.85 | 28 | 2.00 | 26 | 1.85 | 17 | 1.21 | 7 | 0.50 | 6 | 0.43 | 13 | 0.93 | 7 | 0.50 | 2 | 0.14 | 7 | 0.50 | 2 | 0.14 | 1,402 |
| Union | 308 | 58.56 | 120 | 22.81 | 22 | 4.18 | 8 | 1.52 | 7 | 1.33 | 5 | 0.95 | 15 | 2.85 | 11 | 2.09 | 8 | 1.52 | 2 | 0.38 | 4 | 0.76 | 9 | 1.71 | 1 | 0.19 | 1 | 0.19 | 4 | 0.76 | 1 | 0.19 | 526 |
| Volusia | 26,103 | 58.30 | 9,815 | 21.92 | 4,699 | 10.49 | 1,606 | 3.59 | 974 | 2.18 | 686 | 1.53 | 309 | 0.69 | 140 | 0.31 | 105 | 0.23 | 96 | 0.21 | 71 | 0.16 | 47 | 0.10 | 44 | 0.10 | 21 | 0.05 | 34 | 0.08 | 27 | 0.06 | 44,777 |
| Wakulla | 1,741 | 66.58 | 549 | 20.99 | 91 | 3.48 | 30 | 1.15 | 31 | 1.19 | 38 | 1.45 | 36 | 1.38 | 35 | 1.34 | 17 | 0.65 | 13 | 0.50 | 11 | 0.42 | 5 | 0.19 | 7 | 0.27 | 4 | 0.15 | 3 | 0.11 | 4 | 0.15 | 2,615 |
| Walton | 1,939 | 66.34 | 652 | 22.31 | 98 | 3.35 | 54 | 1.85 | 70 | 2.39 | 36 | 1.23 | 19 | 0.65 | 16 | 0.55 | 11 | 0.38 | 9 | 0.31 | 5 | 0.17 | 4 | 0.14 | 5 | 0.17 | 3 | 0.10 | 1 | 0.03 | 1 | 0.03 | 2,923 |
| Washington | 773 | 69.33 | 188 | 16.86 | 29 | 2.60 | 15 | 1.35 | 31 | 2.78 | 14 | 1.26 | 15 | 1.35 | 16 | 1.43 | 7 | 0.63 | 8 | 0.72 | 7 | 0.63 | 4 | 0.36 | 4 | 0.36 | 1 | 0.09 | 2 | 0.18 | 1 | 0.09 | 1,115 |
| Total | 1,077,375 | 61.95 | 397,311 | 22.84 | 146,544 | 8.43 | 39,886 | 2.29 | 32,875 | 1.89 | 17,276 | 0.99 | 8,712 | 0.50 | 5,286 | 0.30 | 4,244 | 0.24 | 2,510 | 0.14 | 1,744 | 0.10 | 1,583 | 0.09 | 1,507 | 0.09 | 1,036 | 0.06 | 664 | 0.04 | 661 | 0.04 | 1,739,214 |

== Notes ==
Additional candidates

== See also ==
- 2020 Florida Republican presidential primary
