= 2016 Arizona Republican presidential primary =

- March 22, 2016

58 pledged delegates to the Republican National Convention
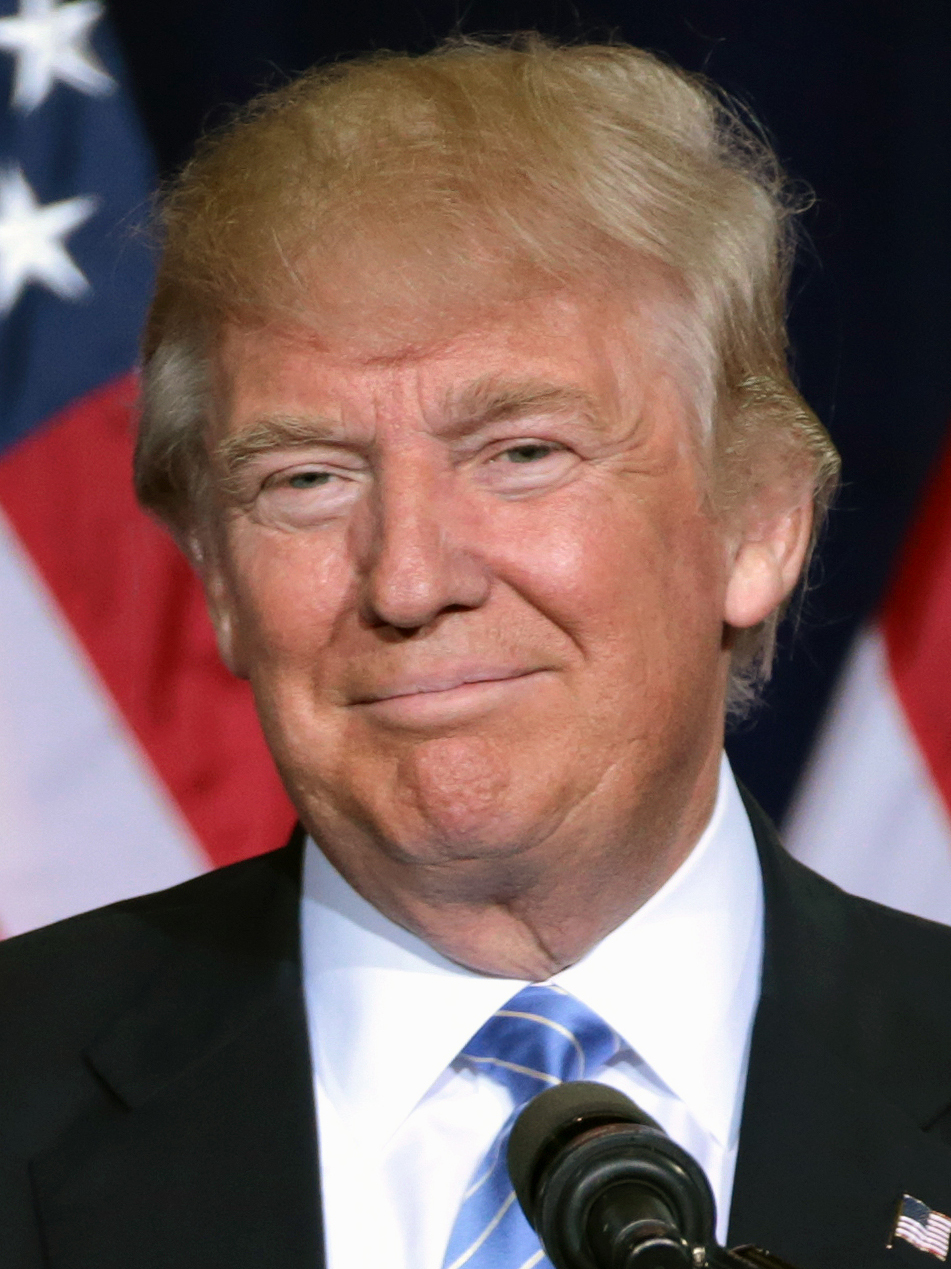

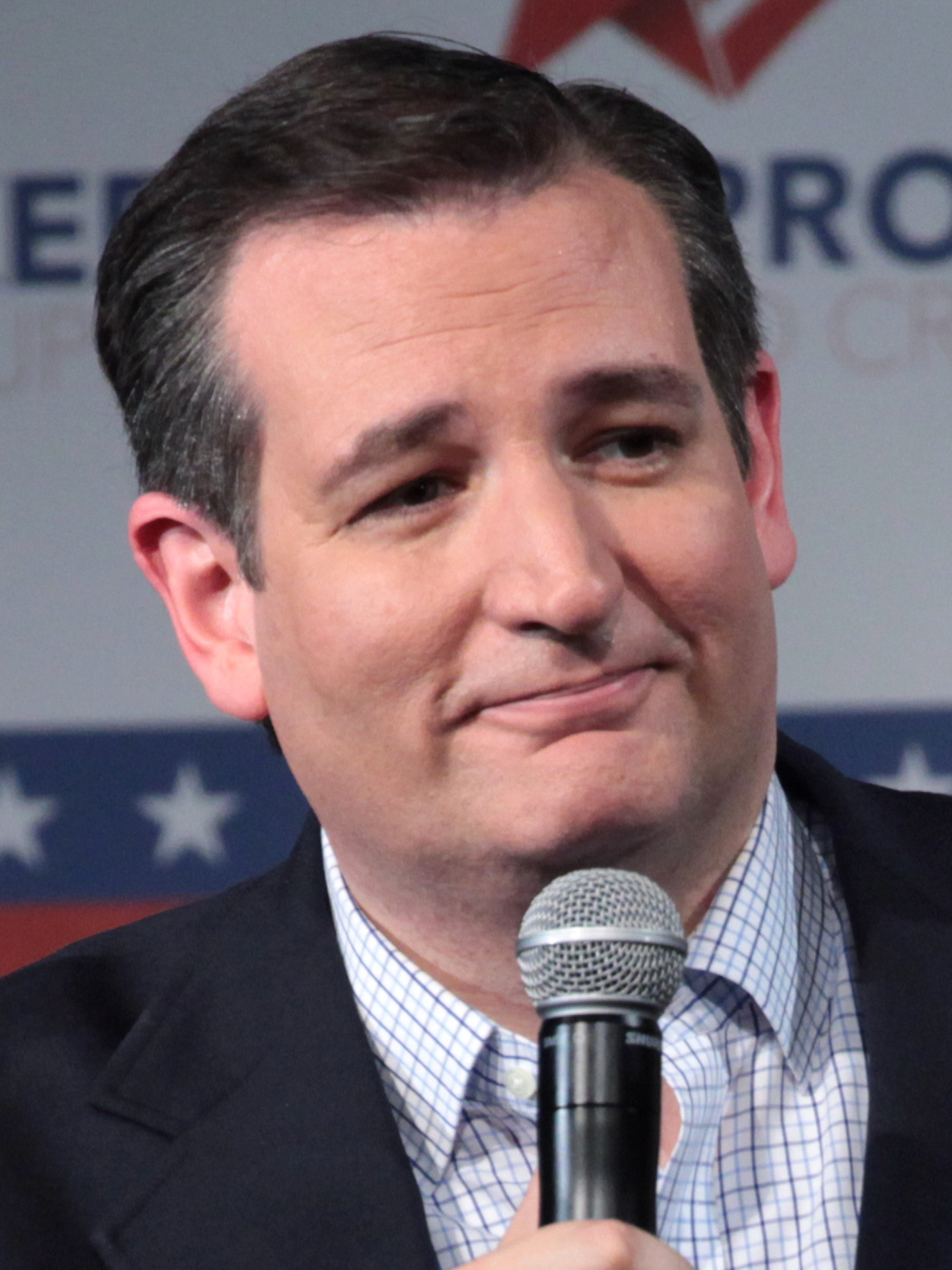

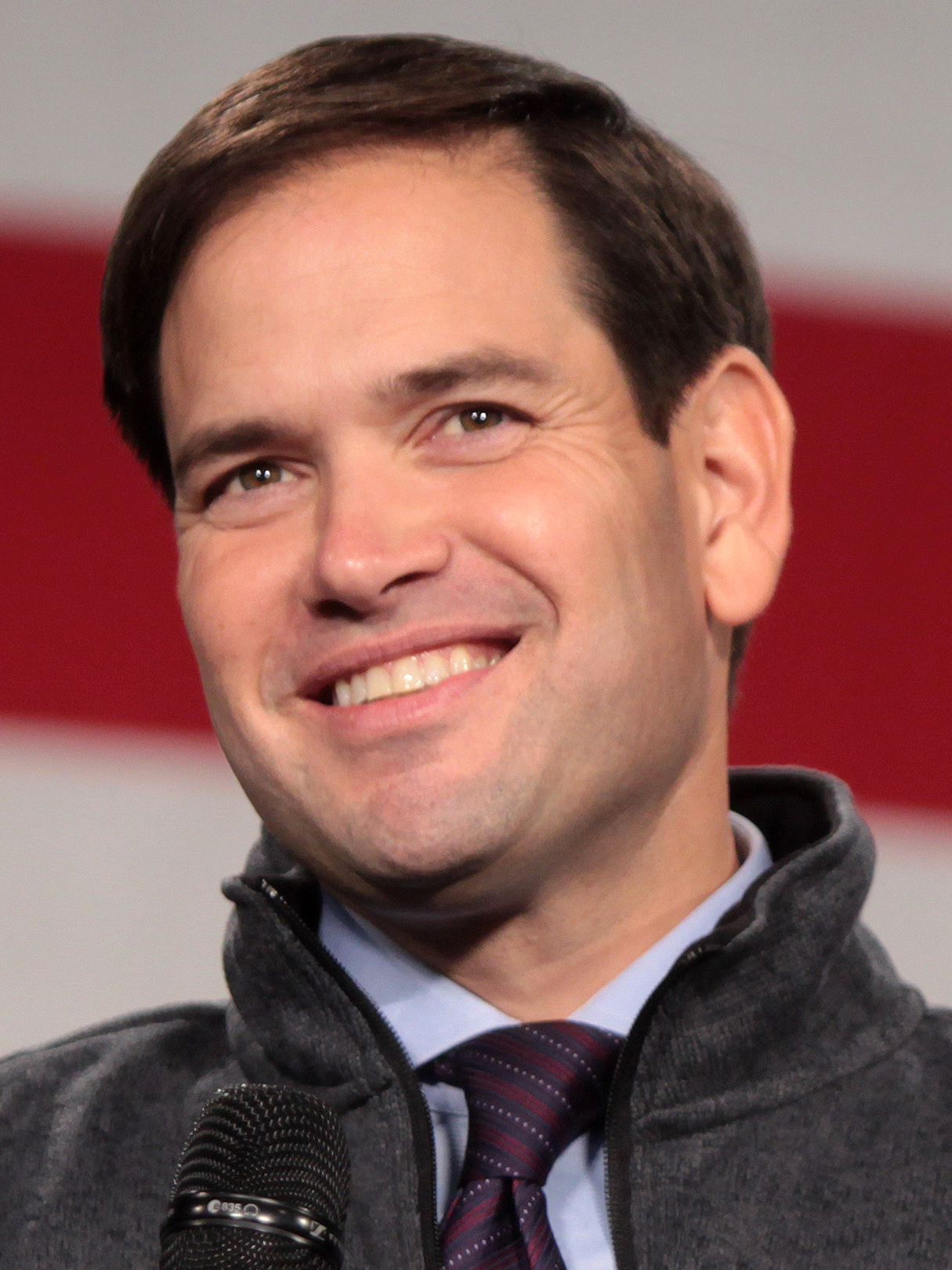

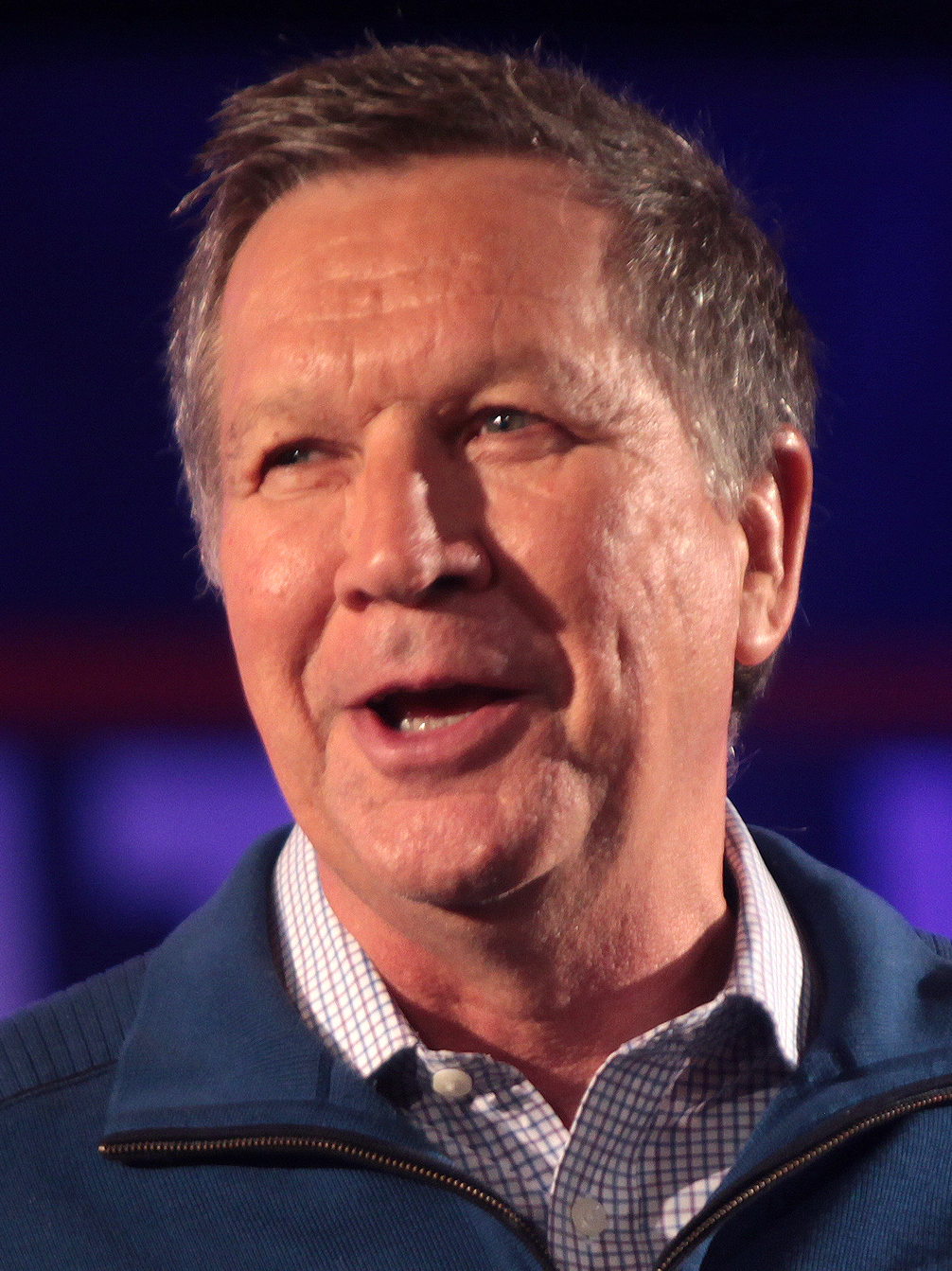
Candidate	Donald Trump	Ted Cruz
Home state	New York	Texas
Delegate count	58	0
Popular vote	286,741	172,294
Percentage	45.95%	27.61%
Candidate	Marco Rubio (withdrawn)	John Kasich
Home state	Florida	Ohio
Delegate count	0	0
Popular vote	72,304	65,965
Percentage	11.59%	10.57%

Donald Trump 30–40% 40–50% 50–60% 60–70%	Ted Cruz 40–50%

The 2016 Arizona Republican presidential primary took place on March 22 in the U.S. state of Arizona as one of the Republican Party's primaries ahead of the 2016 presidential election. Despite a late challenge by Texas Senator Ted Cruz, Donald Trump won the primary and netted all 58 delegates in the winner-take-all contest. On the same day were held Democratic and Green primaries in Arizona, as well as Republican and Democratic caucuses in Utah and Idaho Democratic caucus, so the day was dubbed "Western Tuesday" by media.

== Voter suppression controversy ==
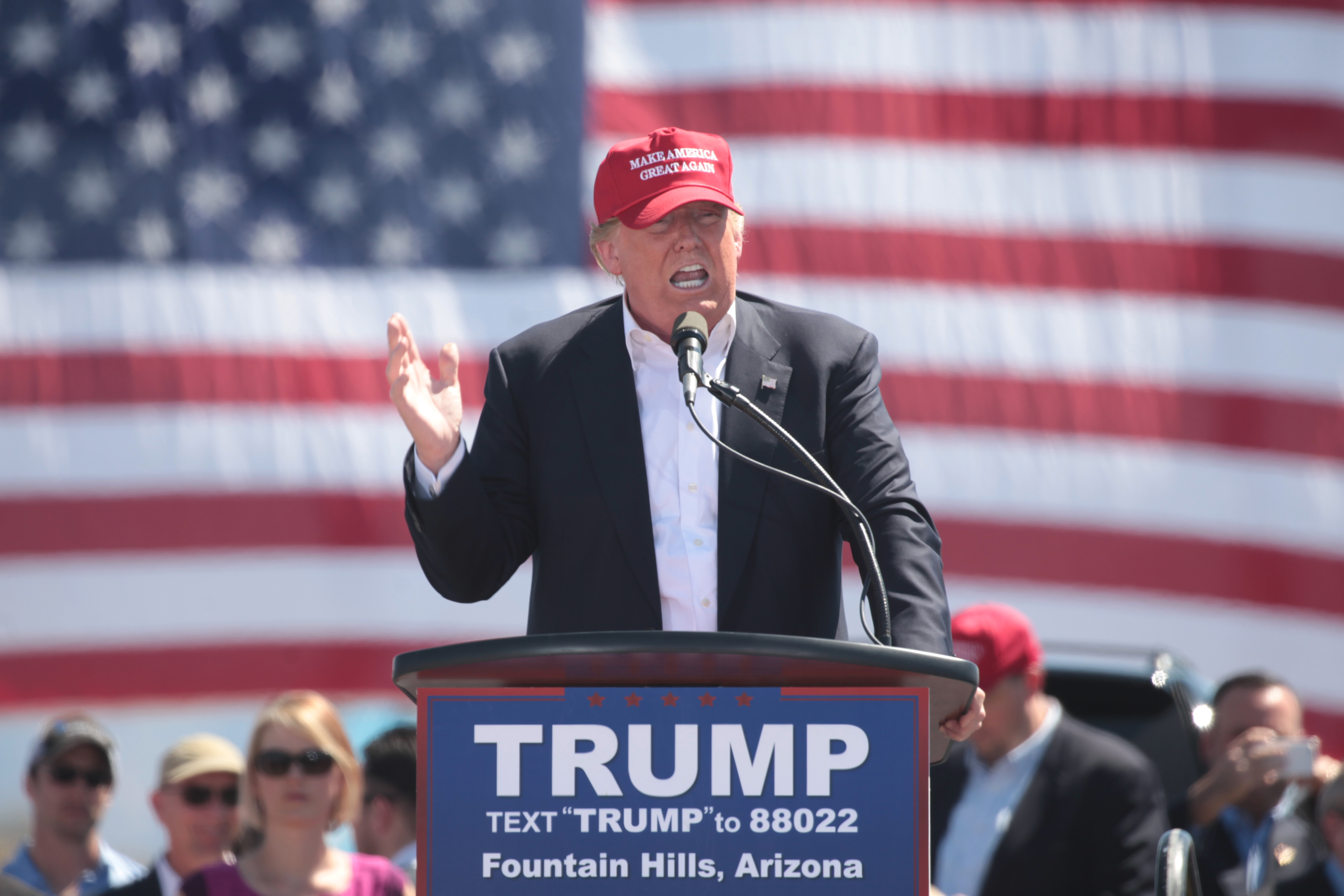
Businessman Donald Trump at a campaign rally at Fountain Park in Fountain Hills on March 19, 2016.

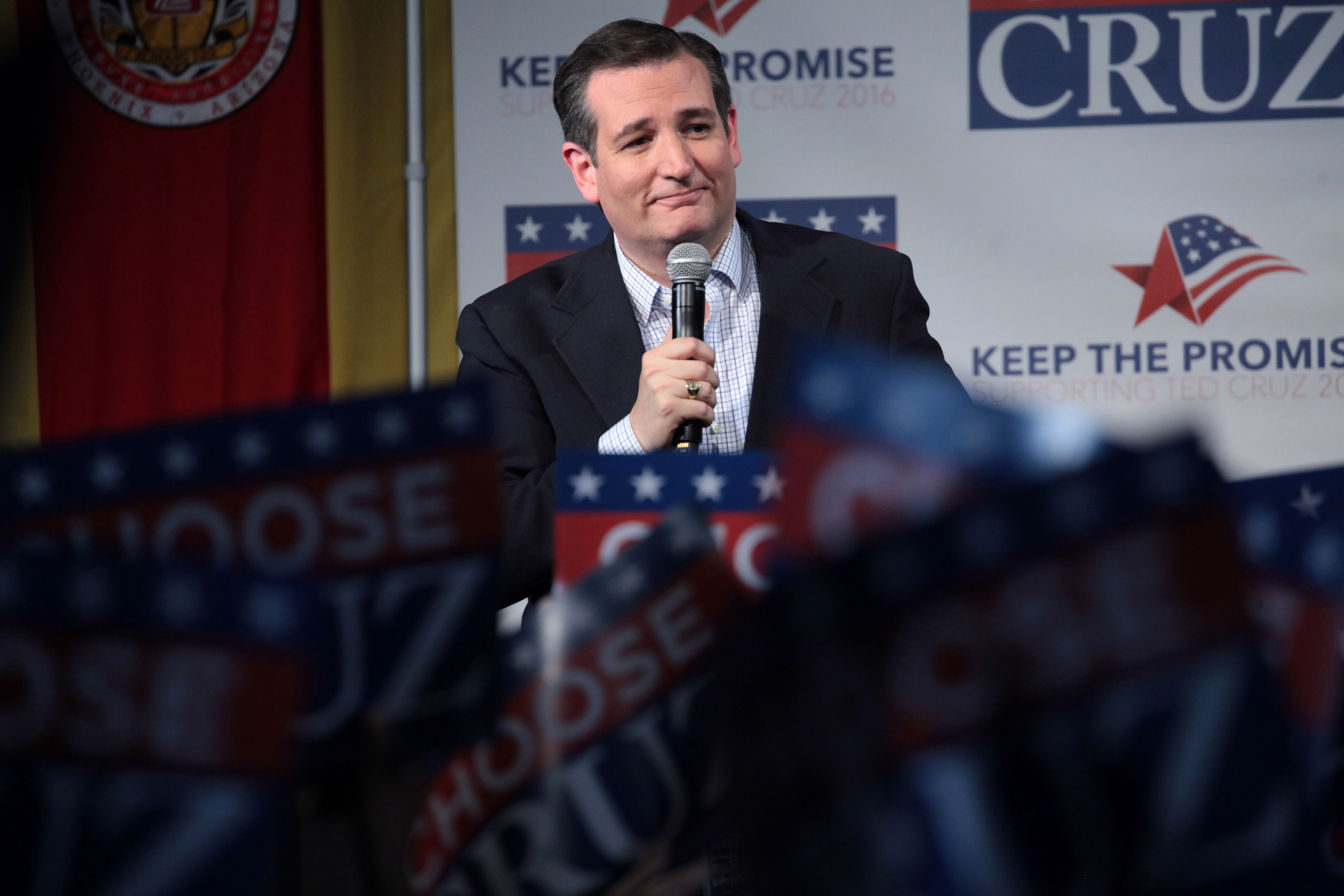
Senator Ted Cruz at a campaign rally at Arizona Christian University in Phoenix on March 18, 2016.

There was controversy surrounding the Arizona primary elections of 2016, specifically having to do with the decrease in polling places in Maricopa County from 200 in 2012 to only 60 in 2016, despite the number of registered voters having increased from 300,000 in 2012 to 800,000 in 2016. This decrease in polling places was most pronounced in minority neighborhoods, most notably Latino neighborhoods, with areas like Central Phoenix having only one polling place for 108,000 voters. There were also reports of voters who had been previously registered coming up as unregistered or registered as an independent, making them ineligible to vote in the closed primary. Voters who did manage to vote had to stand in long lines to cast their ballots, some for as long as five hours. Additionally, voters reported being required to vote with a provisional ballot. In 2005, Arizona threw out 27,878 provisional ballots, counting only about 72.5% of the total provisional ballots reported. Taking into account the effects of the Supreme Court's "gutting of the Voting Rights Act", it's unknown what percentage of the provisional ballots were counted in 2016. This was the first election in the state of Arizona since the 2013 Supreme Court decision to strike down Section 5 of the Voting Rights Act of 1965, which would have previously required states with a history of voter discrimination, including Arizona, to receive Federal approval before implementing any changes to voting laws and practices.

Within a day after the election took place on March 22, a petition went viral on the White House petitions site asking the Department of Justice to investigate voter suppression and election fraud in Arizona. The petition reached 100,000 signatures in 40 hours, and as of June 5, 2016, nearly 220,000 people had signed the petition. The White House responded on May 20, 2016. In addition, Phoenix mayor Greg Stanton asked the Justice Department to launch an investigation into the allegations of voter suppression.

The Department of Justice has since launched a federal investigation into the primary.

== Results ==
Arizona Republican primary, March 22, 2016
Candidate	Votes	Percentage	Actual delegate count		
Candidate	Votes	Percentage	Bound	Unbound	Total
Donald Trump	286,743	45.95%	58	0	58
Ted Cruz	172,294	27.61%	0	0	0
Marco Rubio (withdrawn)	72,304	11.59%	0	0	0
John Kasich	65,965	10.57%	0	0	0
Ben Carson (withdrawn)	14,940	2.39%	0	0	0
Jeb Bush (withdrawn)	4,393	0.70%	0	0	0
Rand Paul (withdrawn)	2,269	0.36%	0	0	0
Mike Huckabee (withdrawn)	1,300	0.21%	0	0	0
Carly Fiorina (withdrawn)	1,270	0.20%	0	0	0
Chris Christie (withdrawn)	988	0.16%	0	0	0
Rick Santorum (withdrawn)	523	0.08%	0	0	0
Lindsey Graham (withdrawn)	498	0.08%	0	0	0
George Pataki (withdrawn)	309	0.05%	0	0	0
Timothy Cook	243	0.04%	0	0	0
Unprojected delegates:			0	0	0
Total:	624,039	100.00%	58	0	58
Source: The Green Papers

=== Results by county ===
County	Trump	Cruz
Apache	42.96%	39.31%
Cochise	49.28%	30.75%
Coconino	37.83%	36.63%
Gila	52.86%	26.41%
Graham	39.03%	42.40%
Greenlee	44.83%	37.68%
La Paz	66.52%	19.12%
Maricopa	44.77%	26.24%
Mohave	64.65%	22.40%
Navajo	41.08%	41.85%
Pima	43.25%	28.83%
Pinal	51.41%	27.92%
Santa Cruz	45.71%	27.12%
Yavapai	47.27%	30.55%
Yuma	48.45%	31.09%
TOTAL	45.95%	27.61%
Source: https://uselectionatlas.org/RESULTS/state.php?fips=4&year=2016&f=0&off=0&elect=2

== Analysis ==
Donald Trump won Arizona decisively, netting all 58 delegates and carrying all counties in the state but two. As The New York Times described, "Mr. Trump proved his appeal among immigration hard-liners, who make up a large bloc of Republicans in the border state."

Trump won the populous cities of Phoenix in Maricopa County, and Tucson in Pima County. He enjoyed support from former Arizona Governor Jan Brewer and Maricopa County Sheriff Joe Arpaio, both of whom hold a hard-line stance against immigration. As Eric Bradner of CNN described, "Their decision to side with Trump, and the size of his win, underscores the potency of Trump's build-a-wall plan with the Republican base."

== See also ==
- 2016 Arizona Democratic primary
