= 2016 Arizona Democratic presidential primary =

- March 22, 2016

Candidate	Hillary Clinton	Bernie Sanders
Home state	New York	Vermont
Delegate count	42	33
Popular vote	262,459	192,962
Percentage	56.3%	41.4%
- Results by county: Clinton: 40-50% 50-60% 60-70% Sanders: 50-60%

The 2016 Arizona Democratic presidential primary was held on March 22 in the U.S. state of Arizona as one of the Democratic Party's primaries ahead of the 2016 presidential election.

On the same day, the Democratic Party held caucuses in Idaho and Utah, while the Republican Party held primaries in two states, including their own Arizona primary and a primary in American Samoa.

== Voter suppression controversy ==
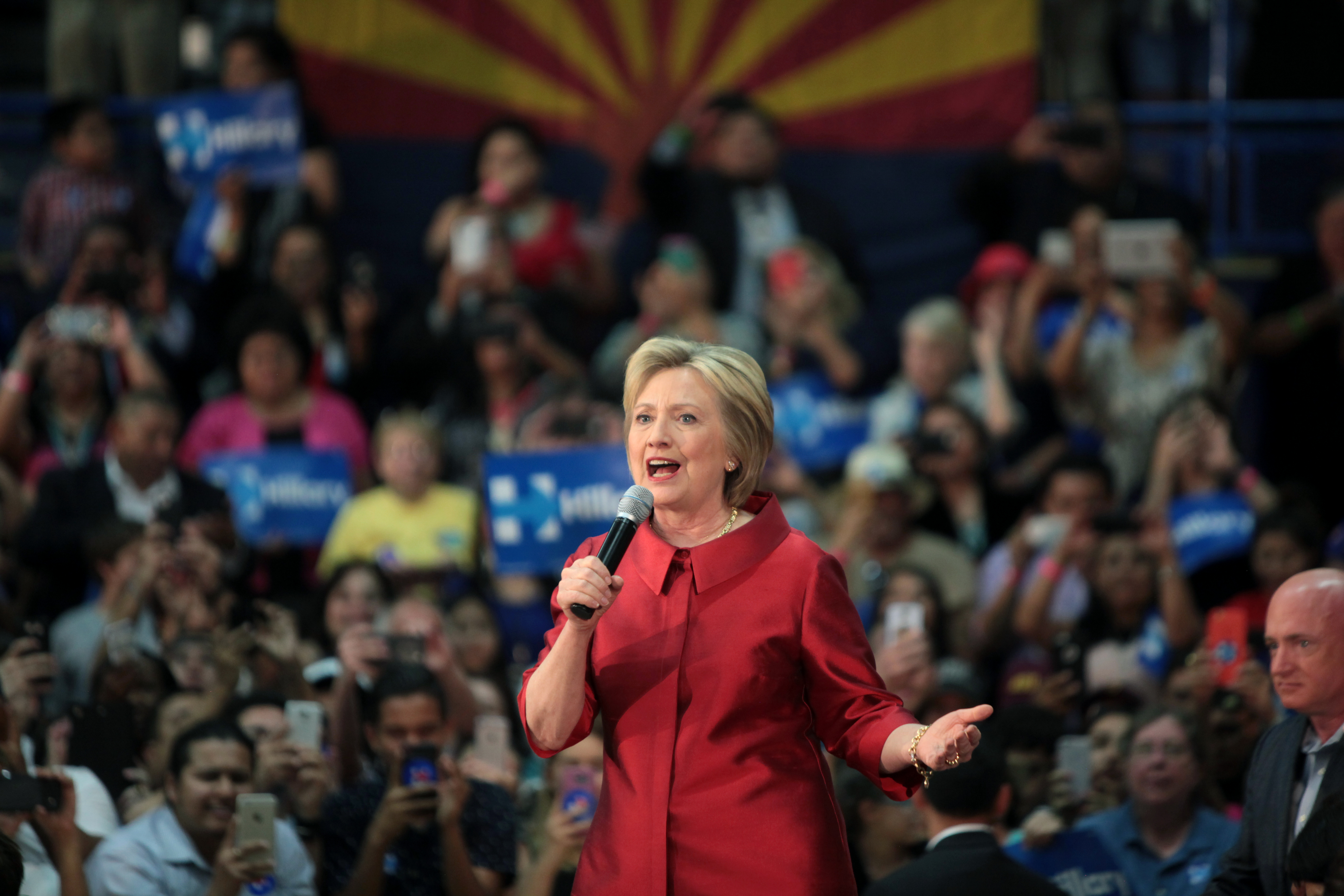
Former Secretary of State Hillary Clinton at a campaign rally at Carl Hayden High School in Phoenix on March 21, 2016.

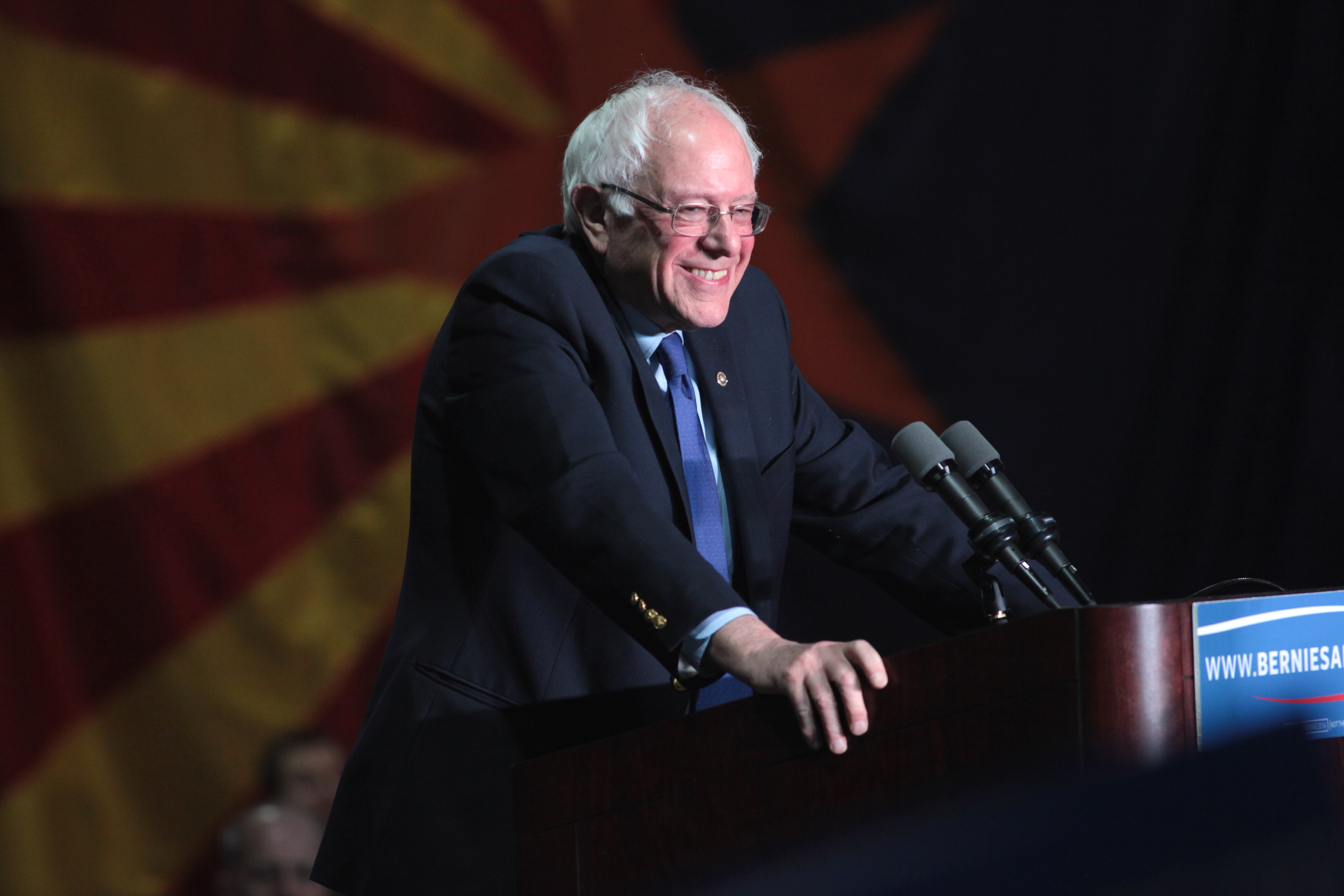
Senator Bernie Sanders at a campaign rally at the Phoenix Convention Center in Phoenix on March 15, 2016.

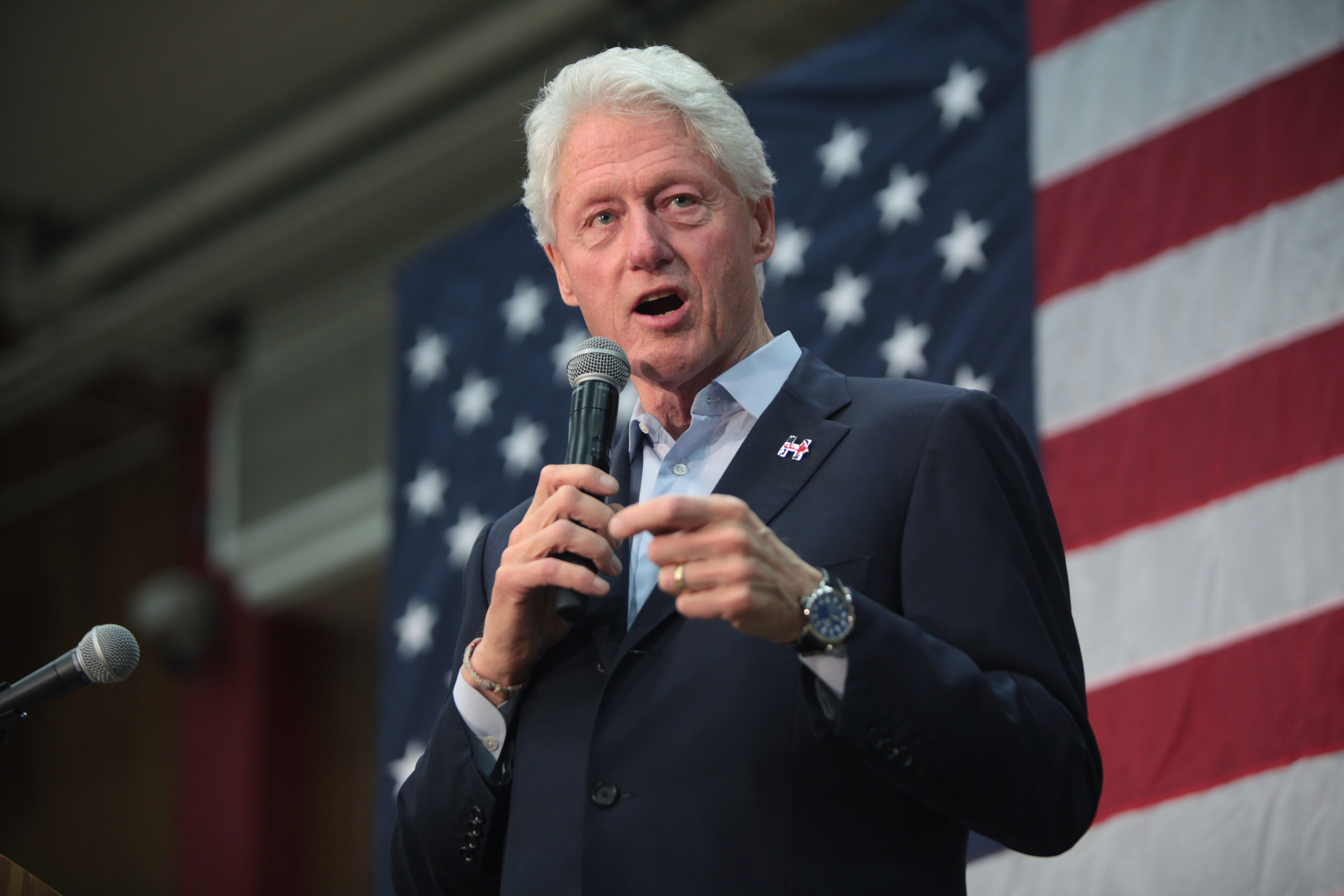
Former President Bill Clinton at a campaign rally for his wife at Central High School in Phoenix on March 20, 2016.

There was controversy surrounding the Arizona primary elections of 2016, specifically having to do with the decrease in polling places in Maricopa County from 200 in 2012 to only 60 in 2016, enacted by Republican officials despite the number of registered voters having increased from 300,000 in 2012 to 800,000 in 2016. This decrease in polling places was most pronounced in minority neighborhoods, most notably Latino neighborhoods, with areas like Central Phoenix having only one polling place for 108,000 voters. There were also reports of voters who had been previously registered coming up as unregistered or registered as an independent, making them ineligible to vote in the closed primary. Voters who did manage to vote had to stand in long lines to cast their ballots, some for as long as five hours. Additionally, voters reported being required to vote with a provisional ballot. In 2005, Arizona threw out 27,878 provisional ballots, counting only about 72.5% of the total provisional ballots reported. This was the first election in the state of Arizona since the 2013 Supreme Court decision to strike down Section 5 of the Voting Rights Act of 1965, which would have previously required states with a history of voter discrimination, including Arizona, to receive Federal approval before implementing any changes to voting laws and practices. In Maricopa County, Republican officials have conducted voter purges that disproportionately affected poor and minority areas.

Within a day after the election took place on March 22, a petition went viral on the White House petitions site asking the Department of Justice to investigate voter suppression and election fraud in Arizona. The petition reached 100,000 signatures in 40 hours, and as of June 5, 2016, nearly 220,000 people had signed the petition. The White House responded on May 20, 2016. In addition, Phoenix mayor Greg Stanton asked the Justice Department to launch an investigation into the allegations of voter suppression.

Both the Clinton and Sanders campaigns, as well as the Democratic National Committee, sued the Arizona state government over the alleged voter suppression. The Department of Justice has since launched a federal investigation into the primary.

== Opinion polling ==
Poll source	Date	1st	2nd	Other
Official Primary results	March 22, 2016	Hillary Clinton; 56.3%	Bernie Sanders; 41.4%	Others; 2.3%
Merrill Poll Margin of error: ± 5.4% Sample size: 300	March 7–11, 2016	Hillary Clinton; 50%	Bernie Sanders; 24%	Others / Undecided; 26%
MBQF Consulting and Marson Media Margin of error: ± 3.6% Sample size: 739	Published February 29, 2016	Hillary Clinton; 56%	Bernie Sanders; 22%	Others / Undecided; 22%
Behavior Research Center Margin of error: ± 7.3% Sample size: 186	October 24 – November 5, 2015	Hillary Clinton; 47%	Bernie Sanders; 19%	Martin O'Malley 2% Uncommitted 32%
One America News Margin of error: ± 4.7% Sample size: 427	Published August 17, 2015	Hillary Clinton; 56%	Bernie Sanders; 34%	Joe Biden 6% Lincoln Chafee 2% Jim Webb 1% Martin O'Malley 1%
Public Policy Polling Margin of error: ± 6% Sample size: 268	May 1–3, 2015	Hillary Clinton; 58%	Bernie Sanders; 16%	Lincoln Chafee 5% Jim Webb 5% Martin O'Malley 4% Not sure 12%

== Results ==
2016 Democratic Party's presidential nominating process in Arizona – Summary of results –
Candidate	Popular vote		Estimated delegates		
Candidate	Count	Percentage	Pledged	Unpledged	Total
Hillary Clinton	262,459	56.3%	42	6	48
Bernie Sanders	192,962	41.4%	33	1	34
Martin O'Malley (withdrawn)	3,877	0.8%			
Roque "Rocky" De La Fuente	2,797	0.6%			
Michael Steinberg	2,295	0.5%			
Henry Hewes	1,845	0.4%			
Uncommitted	—N/a			3	3
Total	466,235	100%	75	10	85

=== Detailed results per congressional district ===
Detailed results for the Arizona Democratic primary, April 5, 2016
District	Total		Hillary Clinton			Bernie Sanders		
District	Votes	Delegates	Votes	%	Delegates	Votes	%	Delegates
1st district	63,863	6	35,445	55.5%	3	26,267	41.1%	3
2nd district	78,237	8	42,797	54.7%	4	33,891	43.3%	4
3rd district	51,520	5	30,298	58.8%	3	20,091	39.0%	2
4th district	37,273	4	20,662	55.4%	2	15,289	41.0%	2
5th district	40,847	5	22,973	56.2%	3	16,982	41.6%	2
6th district	50,465	6	29,266	58.0%	4	20,259	40.1%	2
7th district	42,199	5	24,245	57.5%	3	17,173	40.7%	2
8th district	46,491	5	27,672	59.5%	3	17,651	38.0%	2
9th district	55,340	6	29,101	52.6%	3	25,359	45.8%	3
At-large delegates	466,235	16	262,459	56.3%	9	192,962	41.4%	7
Pledged PLEOs	466,235	9	262,459	56.3%	5	192,962	41.4%	4
Total	466,235	75	262,464	56.3%	42	192,965	41.4%	33

=== Results by county ===
County	Clinton	%	Sanders	%
Apache	4,450	66.4%	1,933	28.8%
Cochise	4,654	56.5%	3,265	39.7%
Coconino	5,738	44.1%	6,941	53.4%
Gila	2,196	59.2%	1,305	35.2%
Graham	937	49.1%	851	44.6%
Greenlee	497	54.6%	325	35.7%
La Paz	309	51.7%	259	43.3%
Maricopa	126,988	58.1%	86,942	39.8%
Mohave	4,170	56.4%	2,847	38.5%
Navajo	4,415	59.7%	2,621	35.4%
Pima	56,317	57.3%	40,228	40.9%
Pinal	9,771	62.1%	5,414	34.4%
Santa Cruz	2,496	65.8%	1,205	31.8%
Yavapai	8,401	52.9%	7,108	44.7%
Yuma	4,358	63.7%	2,156	31.5%
Total	262,459	56.3%	192,962	41.4%

== Analysis ==
A Clinton win in Arizona was expected; she had beat Barack Obama in the state eight years earlier by a similar wide margin, and she generally performed well with minority voters in the 2016 primaries. She won in counties with high populations of Hispanic voters, including the largest county Maricopa where the capital city of Phoenix is located, and she also performed well in counties with large populations of Native Americans including Apache County and Navajo County. Sanders won only in Coconino County.

Bernie Sanders made a late play for the state of Arizona, including airing Spanish-language ads featuring Congressman Raúl Grijalva. Hillary Clinton offset his efforts with advertising featuring former Congresswoman Gabby Giffords, and airing radio ads in the Navajo language.
