= 2020 Democratic Party presidential primaries =

Selection of the Democratic Party nominee

- February 3 to August 11, 2020

3,979 delegates to the Democratic National Convention; 1,990 delegates needed to win (Note: 2,376 of 4,749 delegates needed to win any subsequent ballots at a contested convention. The number of extra unpledged delegates (superdelegates), who after the first ballot at a contested convention would participate in any subsequently needed nominating ballots (together with the 3,979 pledged delegates), was 770 in the end. The exact number of superdelegates had not been fully clear beforehand as it always was subject to change due to possible deaths, resignations, accessions, or potential election as a pledged delegate.)
- Opinion polls

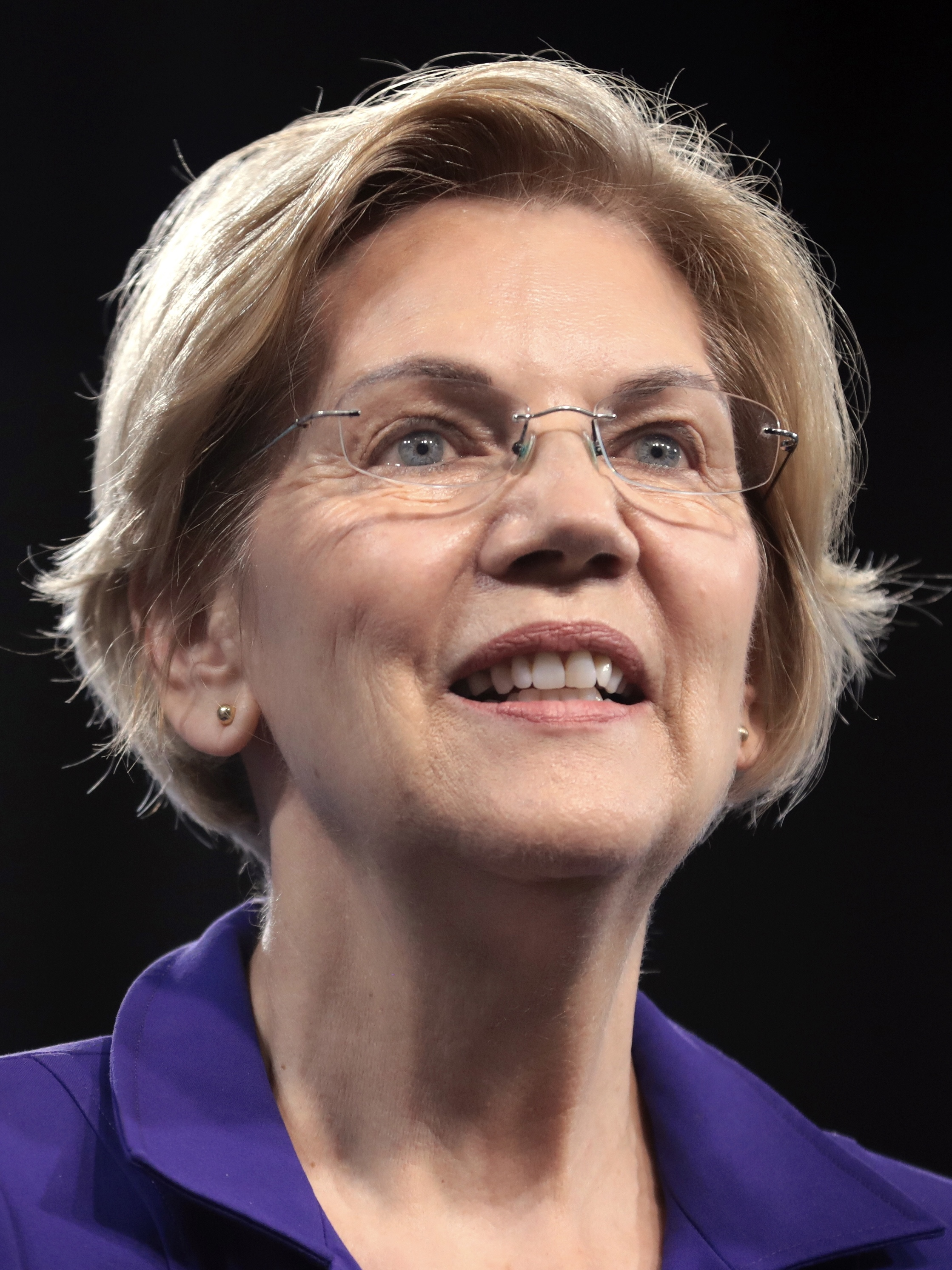

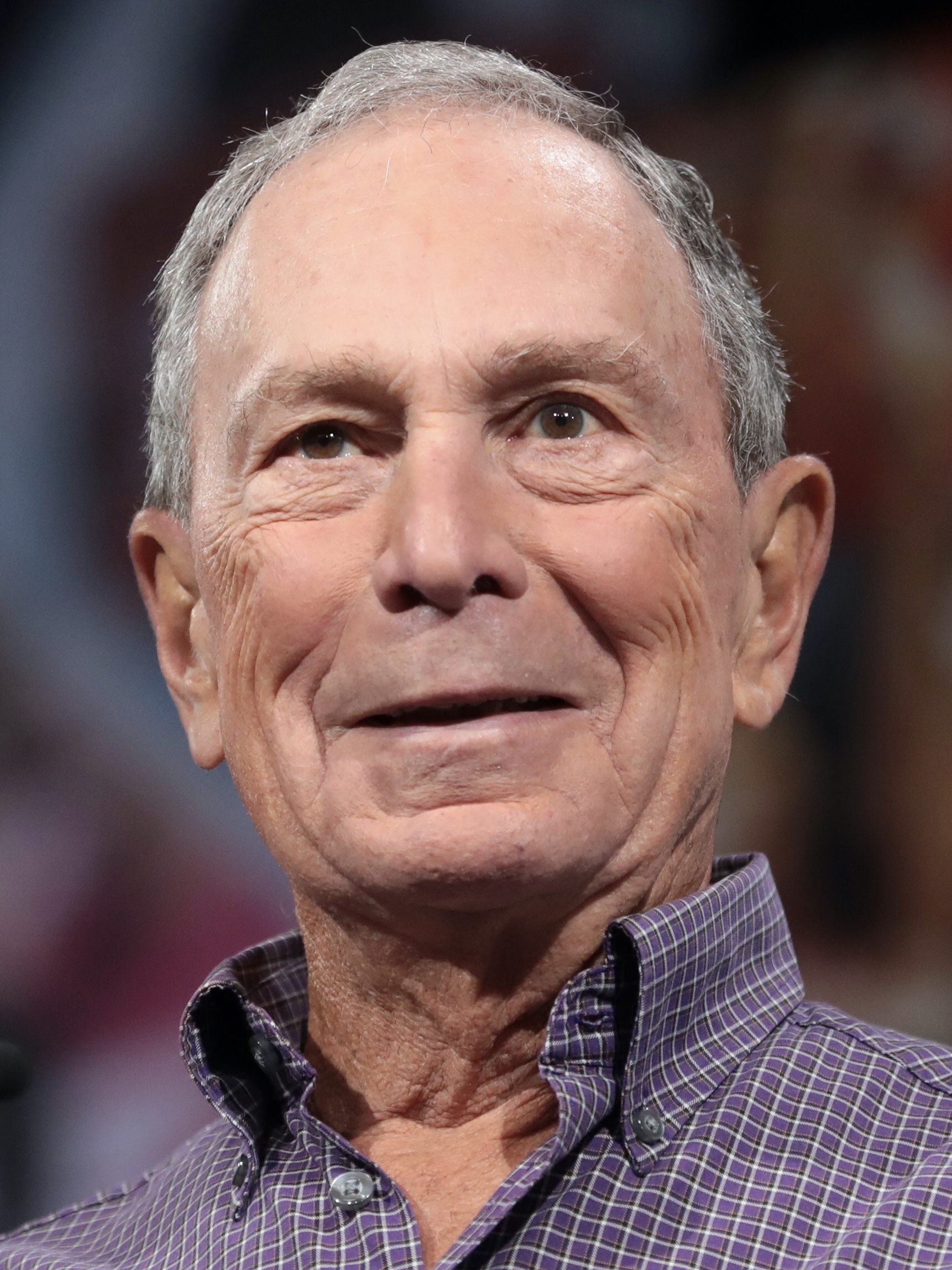

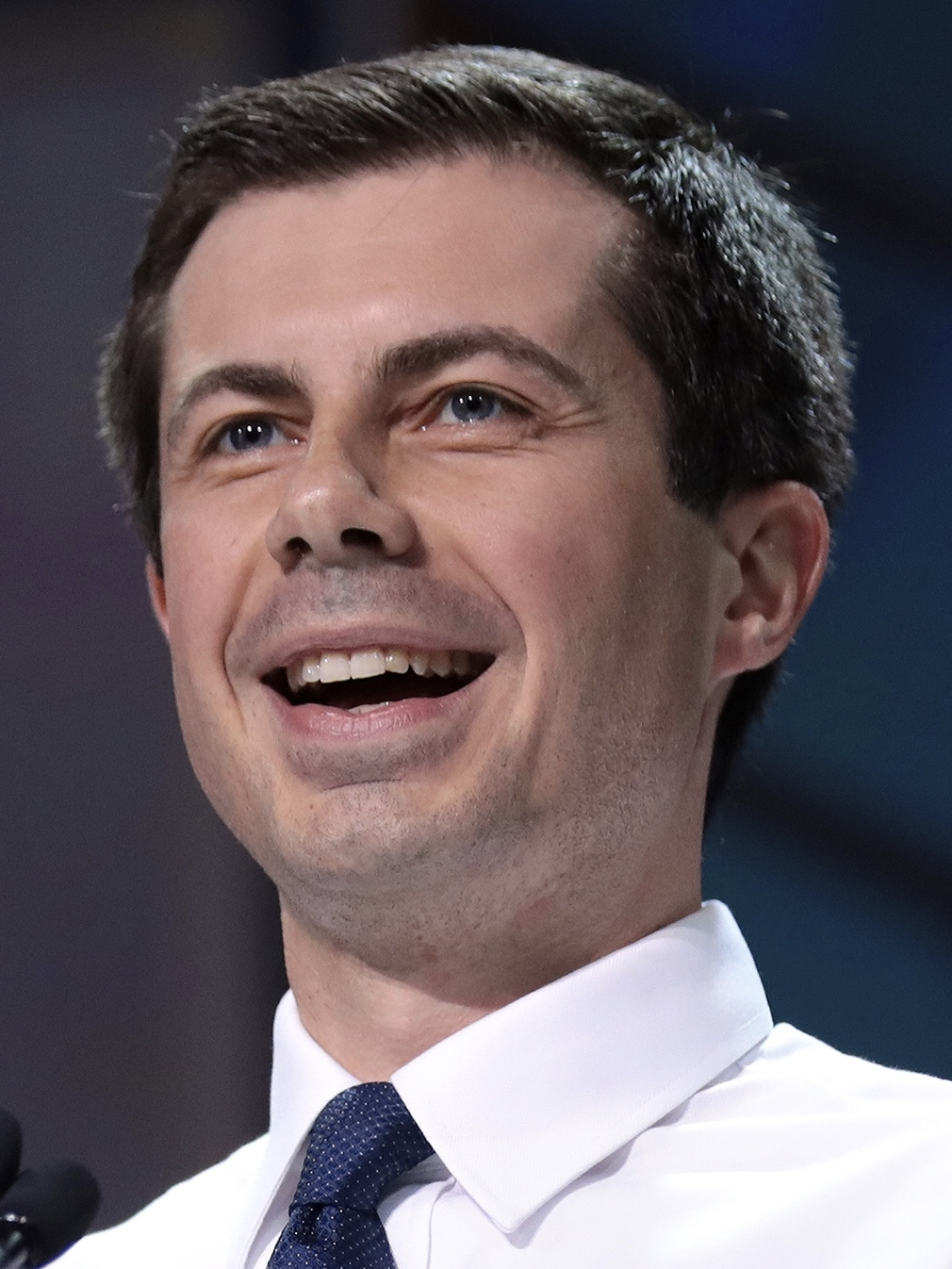
Candidate	Joe Biden	Bernie Sanders	Elizabeth Warren
Home state	Delaware	Vermont	Massachusetts
Delegate count	2,720	1,114	61
Contests won	46	9 (Note: Although Sanders and Buttigieg both earned 9 delegates from New Hampshire, it is counted as a win for Sanders as he won the popular vote.)	0
Popular vote	19,076,052	9,679,213	2,831,472
Percentage	51.8%	26.3%	7.7%
Candidate	Michael Bloomberg	Pete Buttigieg
Home state	New York	Indiana
Delegate count	49	24
Contests won	1	1
Popular vote	2,488,734	924,237
Percentage	6.8%	2.5%

Joe Biden
Bernie Sanders
Pete Buttigieg
Michael Bloomberg
Previous Democratic nominee
Hillary Clinton
Democratic nominee
Joe Biden

Presidential primaries and caucuses were organized by the Democratic Party to select delegates to the 2020 Democratic National Convention to determine the party's nominee for president in the 2020 election. The primaries and caucuses took place in all 50 U.S. states, in the District of Columbia, in five U.S. territories, and through Democrats Abroad. They occurred between February 3 and August 11, 2020.

Former Vice President Joe Biden led in the polls throughout most of 2019. The Iowa caucuses were marred by technical problems; certified results of the caucus eventually showed Mayor Pete Buttigieg winning the most delegates, while Senator Bernie Sanders won the popular vote in the state. Sanders then won New Hampshire and Nevada. Biden, whose campaign fortunes had suffered from losses in Iowa, New Hampshire and Nevada, made a comeback by overwhelmingly winning the South Carolina primary. After Biden won South Carolina, and one day before the Super Tuesday primaries, several candidates dropped out of the race and endorsed Biden. Biden then won 10 out of 15 contests on Super Tuesday.

On April 8, after Sanders withdrew from the race, Biden became the presumptive Democratic presidential nominee. Biden and his running mate, U.S. senator Kamala Harris of California, were nominated for president and vice president by delegates at the Democratic National Convention. Biden and Harris won the presidency and vice presidency in the general election on November 3, defeating incumbent President Donald Trump and incumbent Vice President Mike Pence.

== Overview ==
A total of 29 major candidates declared their 2020 Democratic presidential candidacies, constituting the largest presidential field in U.S. history. With the exception of a brief period in October 2019 when Senator Elizabeth Warren experienced a surge in support, former vice president Joe Biden led in the polls throughout 2019. Eighteen of the 29 declared candidates withdrew before the first primary contest. The first primary was marred by controversy, as technical issues with vote reporting resulted in a three-day delay in vote counting in the Iowa caucuses. The certified results of the caucuses showed Mayor Pete Buttigieg winning the most delegates, while Senator Bernie Sanders won the popular vote in the state. Sanders then won the New Hampshire primary in a narrow victory over Buttigieg before comfortably winning the Nevada caucus, solidifying his status as the front-runner for the nomination. Sanders received significant support from Asian, Hispanic, and young voters.

Biden, whose campaign fortunes had suffered from losses in Iowa, New Hampshire and Nevada, made a comeback by overwhelmingly winning the South Carolina primary. Biden was helped by strong support from African American voters, an endorsement from South Carolina U.S. Representative Jim Clyburn, and Democratic establishment concerns about nominating Sanders. After Biden won South Carolina, and one day before the Super Tuesday primaries, several candidates dropped out of the race and endorsed Biden; before that time, polling saw Sanders leading with a plurality in most Super Tuesday states. Biden then won 10 out of 15 contests on Super Tuesday, beating back challenges from Sanders, Warren, and former New York City Mayor Michael Bloomberg and solidifying his lead. As the primaries proceeded, they were overshadowed by the COVID-19 pandemic, which was declared to be a global pandemic on March 11, 2020. Between March 19 and April 7, most states in the country issued stay-at-home orders, and the overwhelming majority of campaign activity was suspended.

On April 8, 2020, Biden became the presumptive Democratic nominee after Sanders (the only other candidate remaining) withdrew from the race. In early June, Biden passed the threshold of 1,991 delegates to win the nomination. Seven candidates received pledged delegates: Biden, Sanders, Warren, Bloomberg, Buttigieg, Senator Amy Klobuchar and U.S. Representative Tulsi Gabbard. On August 11, Biden announced that former presidential candidate Senator Kamala Harris would be his running mate.

Biden and Harris were nominated for president and vice president by delegates at the Democratic National Convention on August 18 and 19. Biden and Harris won the presidency and vice presidency in the general election on November 3, defeating the Republican ticket of President Donald Trump and Vice President Mike Pence.

== Background ==
After Hillary Clinton's loss in the previous election, many felt the Democratic Party lacked a clear leading figure. Divisions remained in the party following the 2016 primaries, which pitted Clinton against Bernie Sanders. Between the 2016 election and the 2018 midterm elections, Senate Democrats generally shifted to the political left in relation to college tuition, healthcare, and immigration. The 2018 elections saw the Democratic Party regain the House of Representatives for the first time in eight years, picking up seats in both urban and suburban districts.

=== Reforms since 2016 ===
On August 25, 2018, the Democratic National Committee (DNC) members passed reforms to the Democratic Party's primary process in order to increase participation and ensure transparency. State parties are encouraged to use a government-run primary whenever available and increase the accessibility of their primary through same-day or automatic registration and same-day party switching. Caucuses are required to have absentee voting, or to otherwise allow those who cannot participate in person to be included.

Independent of the results of the primaries and caucuses, the Democratic Party, from its group of party leaders and elected officials, also appointed 771 unpledged delegates (superdelegates) to participate in its national convention.

In contrast to all previous election cycles since superdelegates were introduced in 1984, superdelegates will no longer have the right to cast decisive votes on the convention's first ballot for the presidential nomination. They will be allowed to cast non-decisive votes if a candidate has clinched the nomination before the first ballot, or decisive votes on subsequent ballots in a contested convention. In that case, the number of votes required shall increase to a majority of pledged and superdelegates combined. Superdelegates are not precluded from publicly endorsing a candidate before the convention.

There were a number of changes to the process of nomination at the state level. A decline in the number of caucuses occurred after 2016. Democrats in Colorado, Hawaii, Idaho, Kansas, Maine, Minnesota, Nebraska, North Dakota, and Washington all switched from various forms of caucuses to primaries. Hawaii, Kansas, and North Dakota switched to party-run "firehouse primaries".

This resulted in the lowest number of caucuses in the Democratic Party's recent history. Only three states (Iowa, Nevada, and Wyoming) and four territories (American Samoa, Guam, Northern Marianas, and U.S. Virgin Islands) used them. Six states were approved in 2019 by the DNC to use ranked-choice voting in the primaries: Alaska, Hawaii, Kansas, and Wyoming for all voters; Iowa and Nevada for absentee voters. Rather than eliminating candidates until a single winner is chosen, voters' choices were reallocated until all remaining candidates have at least 15%, the threshold to receive delegates to the convention.

Several states which did not use paper ballots widely in 2016 and 2018, adopted them for the 2020 primary and general elections, to minimize potential interference in vote tallies, a concern raised by intelligence officials, election officials and the public. The move to paper ballots enabled audits to start where they had not been possible before, and in 2020 about half the states audit samples of primary ballots to measure accuracy of the reported results. Audits of caucus results depend on party rules, and the Iowa Democratic party investigated inaccuracies in precinct reports, resolved enough to be sure the delegate allocations were correct, and decided it did not have authority or time to correct all errors.

=== Rules for number of delegates ===
==== Number of pledged delegates per state ====
The number of pledged delegates from each state is proportional to the state's share of the electoral college, and to the state's past Democratic votes for president. Thus less weight is given to swing states and Republican states, while more weight is given to strongly Democratic states, in choosing a nominee.

Six pledged delegates are assigned to each territory, 44 to Puerto Rico, and 12 to Democrats Abroad. Each jurisdiction can also earn bonus delegates by holding primaries after March or in clusters of three or more neighboring states.

Within states, a quarter of pledged delegates are allocated to candidates based on statewide vote totals, and the rest typically based on votes in each congressional district, although some states use divisions other than congressional districts. For example, Texas uses state Senate districts. Districts which have voted Democratic in the past get more delegates, and fewer delegates are allocated for swing districts and Republican districts. For example, House Speaker Pelosi's strongly Democratic district 12 has 7 delegates, or one per 109,000 people, and a swing district, CA-10, which became Democratic in 2018, has 4 delegates, or one per 190,000 people.

==== Candidate threshold ====
Candidates who received under 15% of the votes in a state or district didn't get any delegates from that area. Candidates who got 15% or more of the votes divided delegates in proportion to their votes. These rules apply at the state level to state delegates and within each district for those delegates. The 15% threshold was established in 1992 to limit "fringe" candidates. The threshold now means that any sector of the party (moderate, progressive, etc.) which produces many candidates, thus dividing supporters' votes, may win few delegates, even if it wins a majority of votes.

== Schedule and results ==
- February March 3 (Super Tuesday) March 10 March 14–17 March 24–29 April 4–7 April 28 May June February March 3 (Super Tuesday) March 10 March 14–17 April 7–17 April 28 May June July–August

Date (daily totals)	Total pledged delegates	Contest and total popular vote	Delegates won and popular vote							
Date (daily totals)	Total pledged delegates	Contest and total popular vote	Joe Biden	Bernie Sanders	Elizabeth Warren	Michael Bloomberg	Pete Buttigieg	Amy Klobuchar	Tulsi Gabbard	Other
February 3	41	Iowa; 172,300 (Note: Includes only the final caucus alignment, after voters supporting non-viable candidates in the first round were allowed to transfer their vote to a different candidate.)	14 (Note: 8 (but not all) statewide delegates were reallocated towards Biden as the sole remaining candidate at the state convention on June 13, 3 from Sanders, 3 from Warren, and 2 from Buttigieg. Sanders and Buttigieg retained a part of their statewide delegates, and Iowa's allocation apparently did not follow any logical rule pattern.); 23,605 (13.7%)	9; 45,652 (26.5%)	5; 34,909 (20.3%)	16 (0.0%)	12 (Note: Prior to reallocation at the state convention on June 13, Buttigieg had won the caucus with 14 initial delegates, which was the electoral but not final step of delegate selection.); 43,209 (25.1%)	1; 21,100 (12.2%)	16 (0.0%)	3,793 (2.2%)
February 11	24	New Hampshire; 298,377	24,944 (8.4%)	9; 76,384 (25.6%)	27,429 (9.2%)	4,675 (1.6%)	9; 72,454 (24.3%)	6; 58,714 (19.7%)	9,755 (3.3%)	24,022 (8.1%)
February 22	36	Nevada; 101,543 (Note: Includes only the final caucus alignment, after voters supporting non-viable candidates in the first round were allowed to transfer their vote to a different candidate and ranked-choice early voting ballots were reallocated to candidates receiving at least 15%.)	9; 19,179 (18.9%)	24; 41,075 (40.5%)	11,703 (11.5%)		3; 17,598 (17.3%)	7,376 (7.3%)	32 (0.0%)	4,580 (4.5%)
February 29	54	South Carolina; 539,263	39; 262,336 (48.7%)	15; 106,605 (19.8%)	38,120 (7.1%)		44,217 (8.2%)	16,900 (3.1%)	6,813 (1.3%)	64,272 (11.9%)
March 3 (Super Tuesday) (1,344)	52	Alabama; 452,093	44; 286,065 (63.3%)	8; 74,755 (16.5%)	25,847 (5.7%)	52,750 (11.7%)	1,416 (0.3%)	907 (0.2%)	1,038 (0.2%)	9,315 (2.1%)
March 3 (Super Tuesday) (1,344)	6	American Samoa; 351	31 (8.8%)	37 (10.5%)	5 (1.4%)	4; 175 (49.9%)			2; 103 (29.3%)	
March 3 (Super Tuesday) (1,344)	31	Arkansas; 229,122	19 (Note: 2 statewide delegates initially awarded to Bloomberg were reallocated to Biden at the state convention on 30 May as the former withdrew.); 93,012 (40.6%)	9; 51,413 (22.4%)	22,971 (10.0%)	3; 38,312 (16.7%)	7,649 (3.3%)	7,009 (3.1%)	1,593 (0.7%)	7,163 (3.1%)
March 3 (Super Tuesday) (1,344)	415	California; 5,784,364	172; 1,613,854 (27.9%)	225; 2,080,846 (36.0%)	11; 762,555 (13.2%)	7; 701,803 (12.1%)	249,256 (4.3%)	126,961 (2.2%)	33,769 (0.6%)	215,320 (3.7%)
March 3 (Super Tuesday) (1,344)	67	Colorado; 960,128	21; 236,565 (24.6%)	29; 355,293 (37.0%)	8 (Note: Statewide delegates (theoretically 4) were directly left out of the calculation for Warren due to her withdrawal.); 168,695 (17.6%)	9 (Note: Statewide delegates (theoretically 5) were directly left out of the calculation for Bloomberg due to his withdrawal.); 177,727 (18.5%)			10,037 (1.0%)	11,811 (1.2%)
March 3 (Super Tuesday) (1,344)	24	Maine; 205,937	13 (Note: 2 statewide delegates initially awarded to Warren were reallocated to Biden at the state convention on May 30 as the former withdrew.); 68,729 (33.4%)	9; 66,826 (32.4%)	2; 32,055 (15.6%)	24,294 (11.8%)	4,364 (2.1%)	2,826 (1.4%)	1,815 (0.9%)	5,028 (2.4%)
March 3 (Super Tuesday) (1,344)	91	Massachusetts; 1,418,180	45 (Note: 8 statewide delegates initially awarded to Warren were reallocated to Biden at the state committee meeting on May 16 as the former withdrew.); 473,861 (33.4%)	30; 376,990 (26.6%)	16; 303,864 (21.4%)	166,200 (11.7%)	38,400 (2.7%)	17,297 (1.2%)	10,548 (0.7%)	31,020 (2.2%)
March 3 (Super Tuesday) (1,344)	75	Minnesota; 744,198	43 (Note: 5 statewide delegates initially awarded to Warren were reallocated to Biden at the state convention on May 31 as the former withdrew.); 287,553 (38.6%)	27; 222,431 (29.9%)	5; 114,674 (15.4%)	61,882 (8.3%)	7,616 (1.0%)	41,530 (5.6%)	2,504 (0.3%)	6,008 (0.8%)
March 3 (Super Tuesday) (1,344)	110	North Carolina; 1,332,382	68; 572,271 (43.0%)	37; 322,645 (24.2%)	2; 139,912 (10.5%)	3; 172,558 (13.0%)	43,632 (3.3%)	30,742 (2.3%)	6,622 (0.5%)	44,000 (3.3%)
March 3 (Super Tuesday) (1,344)	37	Oklahoma; 304,281	21; 117,633 (38.7%)	13; 77,425 (25.4%)	1; 40,732 (13.4%)	2; 42,270 (13.9%)	5,115 (1.7%)	6,733 (2.2%)	5,109 (1.7%)	9,264 (3.0%)
March 3 (Super Tuesday) (1,344)	64	Tennessee; 516,250	36; 215,390 (41.7%)	22; 129,168 (25.0%)	1; 53,732 (10.4%)	5 (Note: Statewide delegates (theoretically 5) were directly left out of the calculation for Bloomberg due to his withdrawal.); 79,789 (15.5%)	17,102 (3.3%)	10,671 (2.1%)	2,278 (0.4%)	8,120 (1.6%)
March 3 (Super Tuesday) (1,344)	228	Texas; 2,094,428	113; 725,562 (34.6%)	99; 626,339 (29.9%)	5; 239,237 (11.4%)	11; 300,608 (14.4%)	82,671 (3.9%)	43,291 (2.1%)	8,688 (0.4%)	68,032 (3.2%)
March 3 (Super Tuesday) (1,344)	29	Utah; 220,582	7; 40,674 (18.4%)	16; 79,728 (36.1%)	3 (Note: Statewide delegates (theoretically 2) were directly left out of the calculation for Warren due to her withdrawal.); 35,727 (16.2%)	3 (Note: Statewide delegates (theoretically 2) were directly left out of the calculation for Bloomberg due to his withdrawal.); 33,991 (15.4%)	18,734 (8.5%)	7,603 (3.4%)	1,704 (0.8%)	2,421 (1.1%)
March 3 (Super Tuesday) (1,344)	16	Vermont; 158,032	5; 34,669 (21.9%)	11; 79,921 (50.6%)	19,785 (12.5%)	14,828 (9.4%)	3,709 (2.3%)	1,991 (1.3%)	1,303 (0.8%)	1,826 (1.2%)
March 3 (Super Tuesday) (1,344)	99	Virginia; 1,323,693	67; 705,501 (53.3%)	31; 306,388 (23.1%)	1; 142,546 (10.8%)	128,030 (9.7%)	11,199 (0.8%)	8,414 (0.6%)	11,288 (0.9%)	10,327 (0.8%)
March 3–10	13	Democrats Abroad; 39,984	4; 9,059 (22.7%)	9; 23,139 (57.9%)	5,730 (14.3%) (Note: Suspended campaign during the voting period.)	892 (2.2%) (Note: Suspended campaign during the voting period and officially withdrew from the ballot on March 7.)	616 (1.5%)	224 (0.6%)	146 (0.4%)	178 (0.4%)
March 10 (352)	20	Idaho; 108,649	12; 53,151 (48.9%)	8; 46,114 (42.4%)	2,878 (2.6%)	2,612 (2.4%)	1,426 (1.3%)	774 (0.7%)	876 (0.8%)	818 (0.8%)
March 10 (352)	125	Michigan; 1,587,679	73; 840,360 (52.9%)	52; 576,926 (36.3%)	26,148 (1.6%)	73,464 (4.6%)	22,462 (1.4%)	11,018 (0.7%)	9,461 (0.6%)	27,840 (1.8%)
March 10 (352)	36	Mississippi; 274,391	34; 222,160 (81.0%)	2; 40,657 (14.8%)	1,550 (0.6%)	6,933 (2.5%)	562 (0.2%)	440 (0.2%)	1,003 (0.4%)	1,086 (0.4%)
March 10 (352)	68	Missouri; 666,112	44; 400,347 (60.1%)	24; 230,374 (34.6%)	8,156 (1.2%)	9,866 (1.5%)	3,309 (0.5%)	2,682 (0.4%)	4,887 (0.7%)	6,491 (1.0%)
March 10 (352)	14	North Dakota; 14,546	6; 5,742 (39.5%)	8; 7,682 (52.8%)	366 (2.5%)	113 (0.8%)	164 (1.1%)	223 (1.5%)	89 (0.6%)	167 (1.1%)
March 10 (352)	89	Washington; 1,558,776	46; 591,403 (37.9%)	43; 570,039 (36.6%)	142,652 (9.2%)	122,530 (7.9%)	63,344 (4.1%)	33,383 (2.1%)	13,199 (0.9%)	22,226 (1.4%)
March 14	6	Northern Mariana Islands; 134	2; 48 (35.8%)	4; 84 (62.7%)						2 (1.5%)
March 17 (441)	67	Arizona; 613,355	38; 268,029 (43.7%)	29; 200,456 (32.7%)	35,537 (5.8%)	58,797 (9.6%) (Note: While Bloomberg, Klobuchar and four other candidates had formally withdrawn and were not published in the final state canvass, those ballots were included by the state as part of overall cast ballots and any media covering the primary reported individual vote tallies for those candidates.)	24,868 (4.1%)	10,333 (1.7%)	3,014 (0.5%)	12,321 (2.0%)
March 17 (441)	219	Florida; 1,739,214	162; 1,077,375 (61.9%)	57; 397,311 (22.8%)	32,875 (1.9%)	146,544 (8.4%)	39,886 (2.3%)	17,276 (1.0%)	8,712 (0.5%)	19,235 (1.1%)
March 17 (441)	155	Illinois; 1,674,133	95; 986,661 (58.9%)	60; 605,701 (36.2%)	24,413 (1.5%)	25,500 (1.5%)	9,729 (0.6%)		9,642 (0.6%)	12,487 (0.7%)
April 7	84	Wisconsin; 925,065	56; 581,463 (62.9%)	28; 293,441 (31.7%)	14,060 (1.5%)	8,846 (1.0%)	4,946 (0.5%)	6,079 (0.7%)	5,565 (0.6%)	10,665 (1.2%)
April 10	15	Alaska; 19,759 (Note: Includes only the final-round count of a ranked-choice ballot, in which the candidates receiving the fewest votes are progressively eliminated and their votes reallocated to voters' highest-ranked remaining choice, until only candidates receiving at least 15% remain.)	8; 10,834 (54.8%)	7; 8,755 (44.3%)	Eliminated 7th	Eliminated 3rd	Eliminated 6th	Eliminated 5th	Eliminated 4th	170 (0.9%) (Note: Inactive votes from the final round, which had no choice for a viable candidate with 15% (Biden, Sanders) listed.)
April 17	14	Wyoming; 15,391	10; 10,912 (70.9%)	4; 4,206 (27.3%)	Eliminated 7th	Eliminated 5th	Eliminated 6th	Eliminated 4th	Eliminated 2nd	273 (1.8%)
April 28	136	Ohio; 894,383	115; 647,284 (72.4%)	21; 149,683 (16.7%)	30,985 (3.5%)	28,704 (3.2%)	15,113 (1.7%)	11,899 (1.3%)	4,560 (0.5%)	6,155 (0.7%)
May 2	39	Kansas; 146,873	29; 110,041 (74.9%)	10; 33,142 (22.6%)	Eliminated 3rd				Eliminated 1st	3,690 (2.5%)
May 12	29	Nebraska; 164,582	29; 126,444 (76.8%)	23,214 (14.1%)	10,401 (6.3%)				4,523 (2.7%)	
May 19	61	Oregon; 618,711	46; 408,315 (66.0%)	15; 127,345 (20.6%)	59,355 (9.6%)				10,717 (1.7%)	12,979 (2.1%)
May 22	24	Hawaii; 35,044	16; 21,215 (60.5%)	8; 12,337 (35.2%)	Eliminated 9th	Eliminated 7th	Eliminated 5th	Eliminated 3rd	Eliminated 8th	1,492 (4.3%)
June 2 (479)	20	District of Columbia; 110,688	19; 84,093 (76.0%)	11,116 (10.0%)	1; 14,228 (12.9%)				442 (0.4%)	809 (0.7%)
June 2 (479)	82	Indiana; 497,927	80; 380,836 (76.5%)	2; 67,688 (13.6%)	14,344 (2.9%)	4,783 (1.0%)	17,957 (3.6%)	3,860 (0.8%)	2,657 (0.5%)	5,802 (1.2%)
June 2 (479)	96	Maryland; 1,050,773	96; 879,753 (83.7%)	81,939 (7.8%)	27,134 (2.6%)	6,773 (0.6%)	7,180 (0.7%)	5,685 (0.5%)	4,226 (0.4%)	38,083 (3.6%)
June 2 (479)	19	Montana; 149,973	18; 111,706 (74.5%)	1; 22,033 (14.7%)	11,984 (8.0%)					4,250 (2.8%)
June 2 (479)	34	New Mexico; 247,880	30; 181,700 (73.3%)	4; 37,435 (15.1%)	14,552 (5.9%)				2,735 (1.1%)	11,458 (4.6%)
June 2 (479)	186	Pennsylvania; 1,595,508	151; 1,264,624 (79.3%)	35; 287,834 (18.0%)					43,050 (2.7%)	
June 2 (479)	26	Rhode Island; 103,982	25; 79,728 (76.7%)	1; 15,525 (14.9%)	4,479 (4.3%)				651 (0.6%)	3,599 (3.5%)
June 2 (479)	16	South Dakota; 52,661	13; 40,800 (77.5%)	3; 11,861 (22.5%)						
June 6 (14)	7	Guam; 388	5; 270 (69.6%)	2; 118 (30.4%)						
June 6 (14)	7	U.S. Virgin Islands; 550	7; 502 (91.3%)	28 (5.1%)						20 (3.6%)
June 9 (133)	105	Georgia; 1,086,729 (Note: Does not include votes cast in the March 24 presidential preference primary before it was canceled.)	105; 922,177 (84.9%)	101,668 (9.4%)	21,906 (2.0%)	7,657 (0.7%)	6,346 (0.6%)	4,317 (0.4%)	4,117 (0.4%)	18,541 (1.7%)
June 9 (133)	28	West Virginia; 187,482	28; 122,518 (65.3%)	22,793 (12.2%)	5,741 (3.1%)	3,759 (2.0%)	3,455 (1.8%)	3,011 (1.6%)	4,163 (2.2%)	22,042 (11.8%)
June 23 (328)	54	Kentucky; 537,905	52; 365,284 (67.9%)	65,055 (12.1%)	15,300 (2.8%)		9,127 (1.7%)	5,296 (1.0%)	5,859 (1.1%)	2 (Note: Two delegates were awarded to Uncommitted.); 71,984 (13.4%)
June 23 (328)	274	New York; 1,759,039	230; 1,136,679 (64.6%)	44 (Note: According to the final results, Sanders would have mathematically received 45 delegates, but the results were not completed before the national convention.); 285,908 (16.3%)	82,917 (4.7%)	39,433 (2.2%)	22,927 (1.3%)	11,028 (0.6%)	9,083 (0.5%)	171,064 (9.7%)
July 7 (147)	21	Delaware; 91,682	21; 81,954 (89.4%)	6,878 (7.5%)	2,850 (3.1%)					
July 7 (147)	126	New Jersey; 958,762	121; 814,188 (84.9%)	5 (Note: According to the final results, Sanders would have mathematically received 9 delegates, but it seems that the results were not completed before the national convention.); 140,412 (14.6%)						4,162 (0.4%)
July 11	54	Louisiana; 267,286	54; 212,555 (79.5%)	19,859 (7.4%)	6,426 (2.4%)	4,312 (1.6%)	2,363 (0.9%)	2,431 (0.9%)	1,962 (0.7%)	17,378 (6.5%)
July 12	51	Puerto Rico; 7,022	44; 3,930 (56.0%)	5; 932 (13.3%)	101 (1.4%)	2; 894 (12.7%)	158 (2.3%)	31 (0.4%)	194 (2.8%)	782 (11.1%)
August 11	60	Connecticut; 264,416	60; 224,500 (84.9%)	30,512 (11.5%)					3,429 (1.3%)	5,975 (2.3%)
Total; 3,979 pledged delegates 36,922,938 votes			2,720 19,080,074 (51.68%)	1,114 (Note: Following an agreement between Sanders and Biden for party unity, Sanders was allowed to retain all of his statewide delegates (with the exception of 3 from Iowa, which would put his initial result at 1,117 delegates) despite national party rules demanding the reallocation of statewide delegates from withdrawn candidates to the remaining candidates.) 9,680,121 (26.22%)	61 (Note: Warren initially won 79 delegates, but 18 statewide delegates were allocated to Biden as the sole remaining candidate.) 2,831,566 (7.67%)	49 (Note: Bloomberg initially won 51 delegates, but 2 statewide delegates were allocated to Biden as the sole remaining candidate.) 2,552,320 (6.91%)	24 (Note: Buttigieg initially won 26 delegates, but 2 statewide delegates were allocated to Biden as the sole remaining candidate.) 924,279 (2.50%)	7 540,055 (1.46%)	2 273,977 (0.74%)	2 1,040,546 (2.82%)

== Election day postponements and cancellations ==
Due to the COVID-19 pandemic in the United States, a number of presidential primaries were rescheduled. On April 27, New York canceled its primary altogether on the grounds that there was only one candidate left with an active campaign. Andrew Yang responded with a lawsuit, arguing that the decision infringes on voting rights, and in early May, the judge ruled in favor of Yang.

2020 Democratic primaries altered due to COVID-19.
Primary	Original schedule	Altered schedule	Vote in person?	Last changed	Ref.
Ohio	March 17	April 28 (Note: First rescheduled to June 2, then shifted back to April 28 with in-person voting canceled; mail-in ballots must be received by 7:30 p.m. on April 28, 2020 to be counted.)	Canceled	March 25	
Georgia	March 24	June 9	Held	April 9	
Puerto Rico	March 29	July 12	Held	May 21	
Alaska	April 4	April 10 (Note: Mail-in ballots must be received by April 10 to be counted.)	Canceled	March 23	
Wyoming	April 4	April 17 (Note: Mail-in ballots must be received by April 17 to be counted.)	Canceled	March 22	
Hawaii	April 4	May 22 (Note: Mail-in ballots must be received by May 22; results to be announced on May 23.)	Canceled	March 27	
Louisiana	April 4	July 11 (Note: The original rescheduled date was on June 20 before being delayed for the second time.)	Held	April 14	
Maryland	April 28	June 2	Held	March 17	
Pennsylvania	April 28	June 2	Held	March 27	
Rhode Island	April 28	June 2	Held	March 23	
New York	April 28	June 23	Held	April 27	
Delaware	April 28	July 7	Held	May 7	
Connecticut	April 28	August 11	Held	April 17	
Kansas	May 2	May 2 (Note: Mail-in ballots must be received by May 2.)	Canceled	March 30	
Guam	May 2	June 6	Held	June 4	
Indiana	May 5	June 2	Held	March 20	
West Virginia	May 12	June 9	Held	April 1	
Kentucky	May 19	June 23	Held	March 16	
New Jersey	June 2	July 7 (Note: Mail-in ballots must be received by July 14 to be counted.)	Held	April 8	

In addition, the DNC elected to delay the 2020 Democratic National Convention from July 13–16 to August 17–20.

== Candidates ==
Major candidates in the 2020 Democratic presidential primaries had held significant elective office or received substantial media coverage.

Nearly 300 candidates who did not receive significant media coverage also filed with the Federal Election Commission to run for president in the primary.

=== Nominee ===
Democratic nominee for the 2020 presidential election
Candidate	Born	Most recent position	Home state	Campaign Announcement date	Total pledged delegates	Popular vote	Contests won	Running mate	Ref.
Joe Biden	November 20, 1942 (age 77); Scranton, Pennsylvania	Vice President of the United States (2009–2017)	Delaware	Campaign April 25, 2019; FEC filing Secured nomination: June 5, 2020	2720 / 3979 (68%)	19,080,074 (51.68%)	46; AL, AK, AZ, AR, CT, DE, DC, FL, GA, GU, HI, ID, IL, IN, KS, KY, LA, ME, MD, MA, MI, MN, MS, MO, MT, NE, NJ, NM, NY, NC, OH, OK, OR, PA, PR, RI, SC, SD, TN, TX, VA, VI, WA, WV, WI, WY	Kamala Harris	

=== Withdrew during the primaries ===
Major candidates who withdrew during the 2020 Democratic Party presidential primaries
Candidate	Born	Most recent position	Home state	Campaign announced	Campaign suspended	Campaign	Total pledged delegates	Popular vote	Contests won	Ref.
Bernie Sanders	September 8, 1941 (age 78); Brooklyn, New York	U.S. senator from Vermont (2007–present)	Vermont	February 19, 2019	April 8, 2020 (endorsed Biden as presumptive nominee)	__________; Campaign; FEC filing	1114 / 3979 (28%)	9,679,213 (26.63%)	9 CA, CO, DA, NV, NH, ND, MP, UT, VT	
Tulsi Gabbard	April 12, 1981 (age 39); Leloaloa, American Samoa	U.S. representative from HI-02 (2013–2021)	Hawaii	January 11, 2019	March 19, 2020 (endorsed Biden)	__________; Campaign; FEC filing	2 / 3979 (0%)	273,940 (0.76%)	0	
Elizabeth Warren	June 22, 1949 (age 71); Oklahoma City, Oklahoma	U.S. senator from Massachusetts (2013–present)	Massachusetts	February 9, 2019; Exploratory committee: December 31, 2018	March 5, 2020 (endorsed Biden as presumptive nominee)	__________; Campaign; FEC filing	61 / 3979 (2%)	2,780,873 (7.77%)	0	
Michael Bloomberg	February 14, 1942 (age 78); Boston, Massachusetts	Mayor of New York City (2002–2013)	New York	November 24, 2019; Exploratory committee: November 21, 2019	March 4, 2020 (endorsed Biden)	__________; Campaign; FEC filing	49 / 3979 (1%)	2,475,130 (6.92%)	1 AS	
Amy Klobuchar	May 25, 1960 (age 60); Plymouth, Minnesota	U.S. senator from Minnesota (2007–present)	Minnesota	February 10, 2019	March 2, 2020 (endorsed Biden)	__________; Campaign; FEC filing	7 / 3979 (0%)	524,400 (1.47%)	0	
Pete Buttigieg	January 19, 1982 (age 38); South Bend, Indiana	Mayor of South Bend (2012–2020)	Indiana	April 14, 2019; Exploratory committee: January 23, 2019	March 1, 2020 (endorsed Biden)	__________; Campaign; FEC filing	24 / 3979 (1%)	912,214 (2.55%)	1 IA	
Tom Steyer	June 27, 1957 (age 63); Manhattan, New York	Hedge fund manager	California	July 9, 2019	February 29, 2020 (endorsed Biden as presumptive nominee)	__________; Campaign; FEC filing	0	258,848 (0.72%)	0	
Deval Patrick	July 31, 1956 (age 64); Chicago, Illinois	Governor of Massachusetts (2007–2015)	Massachusetts	November 14, 2019	February 12, 2020 (endorsed Biden)	__________; Campaign; FEC filing	0	27,116 (0.08%)	0	
Michael Bennet	November 28, 1964 (age 55); New Delhi, India	U.S. senator from Colorado (2009–present)	Colorado	May 2, 2019	February 11, 2020 (endorsed Biden as presumptive nominee)	__________; Campaign; FEC filing	0	62,260 (0.17%)	0	
Andrew Yang	January 13, 1975 (age 45); Schenectady, New York	Entrepreneur	New York	November 6, 2017	February 11, 2020 (endorsed Biden)	__________; Campaign; FEC filing	0	160,231 (0.45%)	0	

Other notable individuals who were not major candidates terminated their campaigns during the primaries:

- Henry Hewes, real estate developer; Right to Life nominee for Mayor of New York City in 1989 and U.S. Senate from New York in 1994
- Sam Sloan, chess player and publisher (Ran for Congress in NY-14)
- Robby Wells, former college football coach; Independent candidate for president in 2016

=== Withdrew before the primaries ===
Major candidates who withdrew before the 2020 Democratic Party presidential primaries
Candidate	Born	Most recent position	Home state	Campaign announced	Campaign suspended	Campaign	Popular vote	Ref.
John Delaney	April 16, 1963 (age 57); Wood-Ridge, New Jersey	U.S. representative from MD-06 (2013–2019)	Maryland	July 28, 2017	January 31, 2020 (endorsed Biden)	__________; Campaign; FEC filing	19,342	
Cory Booker	April 27, 1969 (age 51); Washington, D.C.	U.S. senator from New Jersey (2013–present)	New Jersey	February 1, 2019	January 13, 2020 (ran successfully for reelection; endorsed Biden)	__________; Campaign; FEC filing	31,575	
Marianne Williamson	July 8, 1952 (age 68); Houston, Texas	Author	California	January 28, 2019; Exploratory committee: November 15, 2018	January 10, 2020 (endorsed Sanders, later Biden as nominee)	__________; Campaign; FEC filing	22,334	
Julián Castro	September 16, 1974 (age 45); San Antonio, Texas	U.S. Secretary of Housing and Urban Development (2014–2017)	Texas	January 12, 2019; Exploratory committee: December 12, 2018	January 2, 2020 (endorsed Warren, later Biden as presumptive nominee)	__________; Campaign; FEC filing	37,037	
Kamala Harris	October 20, 1964 (age 55); Oakland, California	U.S. senator from California (2017–2021)	California	January 21, 2019	December 3, 2019 (endorsed Biden who later chose Harris as his vice presidential running-mate)	__________; Campaign; FEC filing	844	
Steve Bullock	April 11, 1966 (age 54); Missoula, Montana	Governor of Montana (2013–2021)	Montana	May 14, 2019	December 2, 2019 (ran unsuccessfully for U.S. Senate; endorsed Biden as nominee)	__________; Campaign; FEC filing	549	
Joe Sestak	December 12, 1951 (age 68); Secane, Pennsylvania	U.S. representative from PA-07 (2007–2011)	Virginia	June 23, 2019	December 1, 2019 (endorsed Klobuchar, later Biden as nominee)	Campaign; FEC filing	5,251	
Wayne Messam	June 7, 1974 (age 46); South Bay, Florida	Mayor of Miramar (2015–present)	Florida	March 28, 2019; Exploratory committee: March 13, 2019	November 19, 2019	__________; Campaign; FEC filing	0 (Note: Candidate did not appear on any ballots.)	
Beto O'Rourke	September 26, 1972 (age 47); El Paso, Texas	U.S. representative from TX-16 (2013–2019)	Texas	March 14, 2019	November 1, 2019 (endorsed Biden)	__________; Campaign; FEC filing	1	
Tim Ryan	July 16, 1973 (age 47); Niles, Ohio	U.S. representative from OH-13 (2013–2023)	Ohio	April 4, 2019	October 24, 2019 (ran successfully for reelection; endorsed Biden)	__________; Campaign; FEC filing	0	
Bill de Blasio	May 8, 1961 (age 59); Manhattan, New York	Mayor of New York City (2014–2021)	New York	May 16, 2019	September 20, 2019 (endorsed Sanders, later Biden as presumptive nominee)	__________; Campaign; FEC filing	0	
Kirsten Gillibrand	December 9, 1966 (age 53); Albany, New York	U.S. senator from New York (2009–present)	New York	March 17, 2019; Exploratory committee: January 15, 2019	August 28, 2019 (endorsed Biden)	__________; Campaign; FEC filing	0	
Seth Moulton	October 24, 1978 (age 41); Salem, Massachusetts	U.S. representative from MA-06 (2015–present)	Massachusetts	April 22, 2019	August 23, 2019 (ran successfully for reelection; endorsed Biden)	__________; Campaign; FEC filing	0	
Jay Inslee	February 9, 1951 (age 69); Seattle, Washington	Governor of Washington (2013–2025)	Washington	March 1, 2019	August 21, 2019 (ran successfully for reelection; endorsed Biden as presumptive nominee)	__________; Campaign; FEC filing	1	
John Hickenlooper	February 7, 1952 (age 68); Narberth, Pennsylvania	Governor of Colorado (2011–2019)	Colorado	March 4, 2019	August 15, 2019 (ran successfully for U.S. Senate; endorsed Bennet, later Biden as presumptive nominee)	__________; Campaign; FEC filing	1	
Mike Gravel	May 13, 1930 (aged 90); Springfield, Massachusetts	U.S. senator from Alaska (1969–1981)	California	April 2, 2019; Exploratory committee: March 19, 2019	August 6, 2019 (co-endorsed Gabbard and Sanders)	__________; Campaign; FEC filing	0	
Eric Swalwell	November 16, 1980 (age 39); Sac City, Iowa	U.S. representative from CA-15 (2013–2023)	California	April 8, 2019	July 8, 2019 (ran successfully for reelection; endorsed Biden)	__________; Campaign; FEC filing	0	
Richard Ojeda	September 25, 1970 (age 49); Rochester, Minnesota	West Virginia state senator from WV-SD07 (2016–2019)	West Virginia	November 11, 2018	January 25, 2019 (ran unsuccessfully for U.S. Senate; endorsed Biden)	Campaign; FEC filing	0	

Other notable individuals who were not major candidates terminated their campaigns before the primaries:

- Ben Gleib, actor, comedian, satirist, and writer
- Ami Horowitz, conservative activist and documentary filmmaker (endorsed Donald Trump)
- Michael Katz, former member of the Delaware Senate
- Brian Moore, activist; Green nominee for U.S. Senate from Florida in 2006; Socialist and Liberty Union nominee for president in 2008
- Ken Nwadike Jr., documentary filmmaker, motivational speaker, and peace activist

=== Declined to run ===
A number of individuals considered a run, either publicly or privately, but ultimately decided against it.

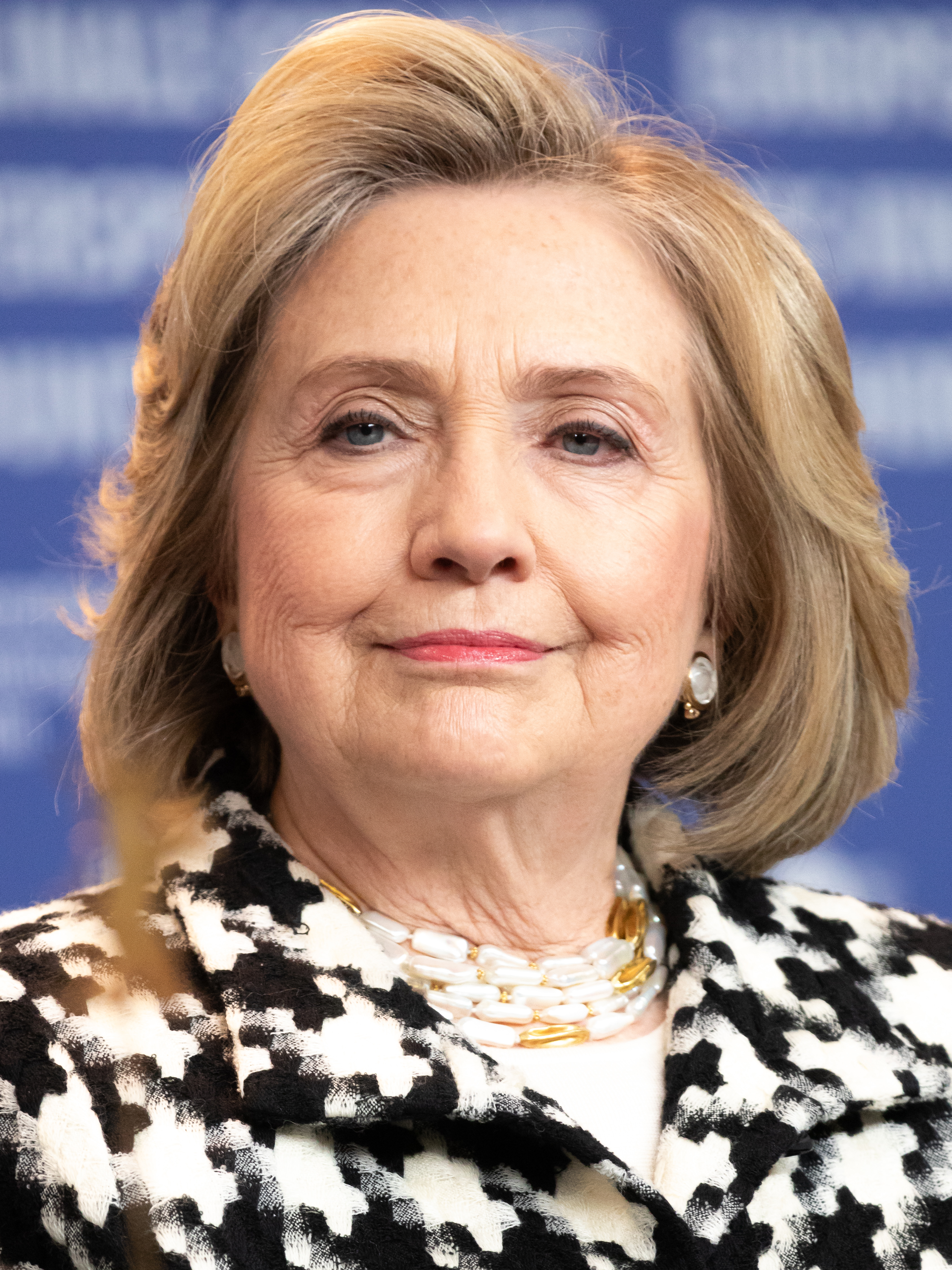
Hillary Clinton, former U.S. Secretary of State and 2016 Democratic nominee

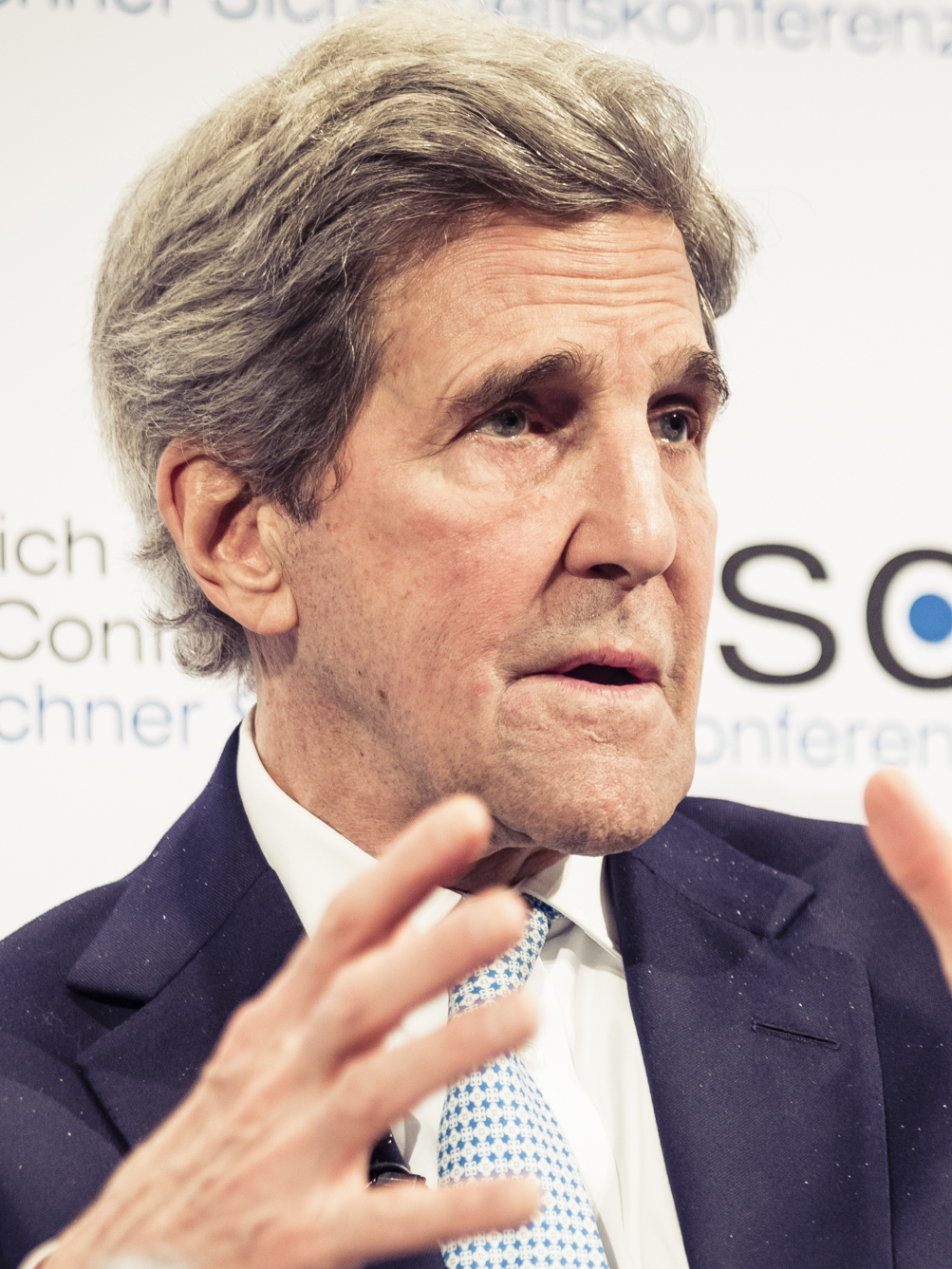
John Kerry, former U.S. Secretary of State and 2004 Democratic nominee

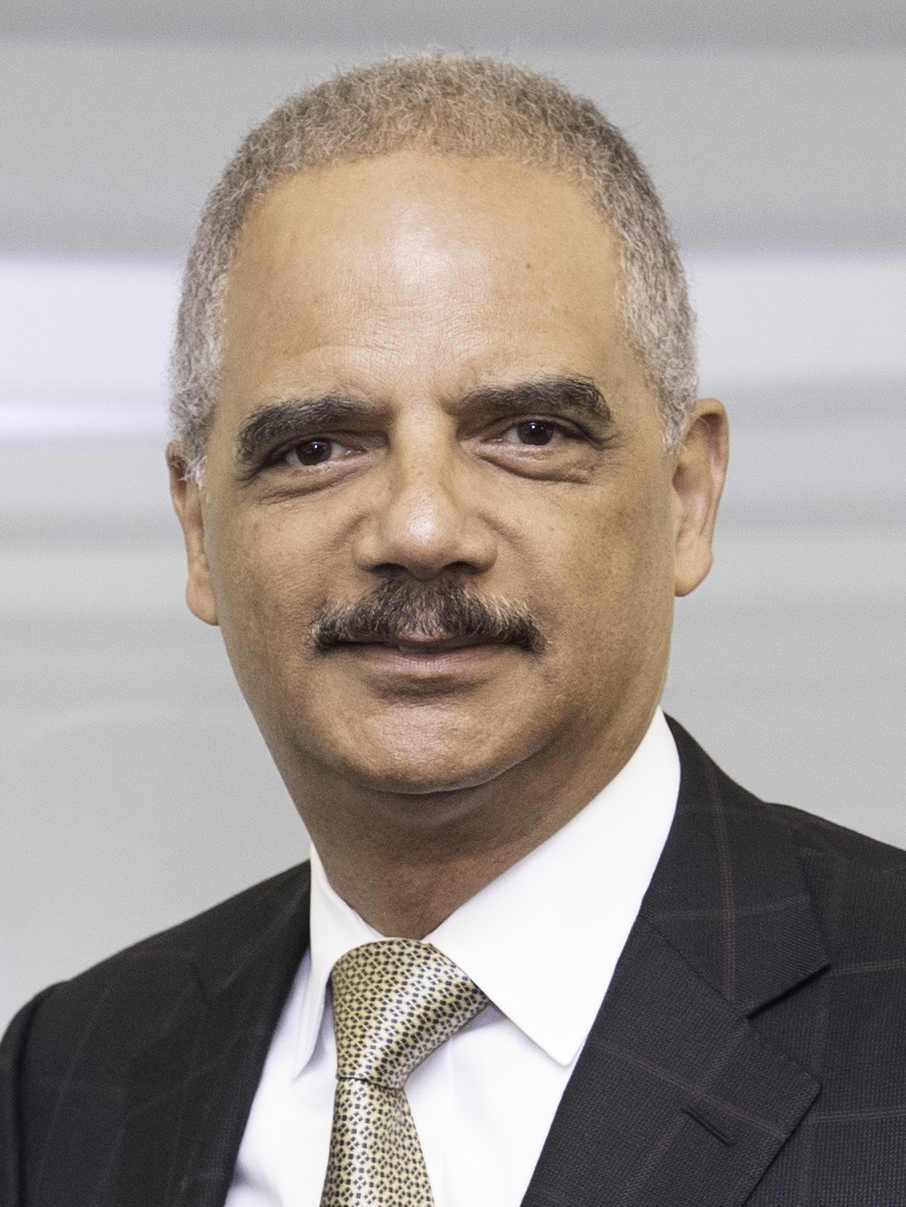
Eric Holder, former U.S. Attorney General

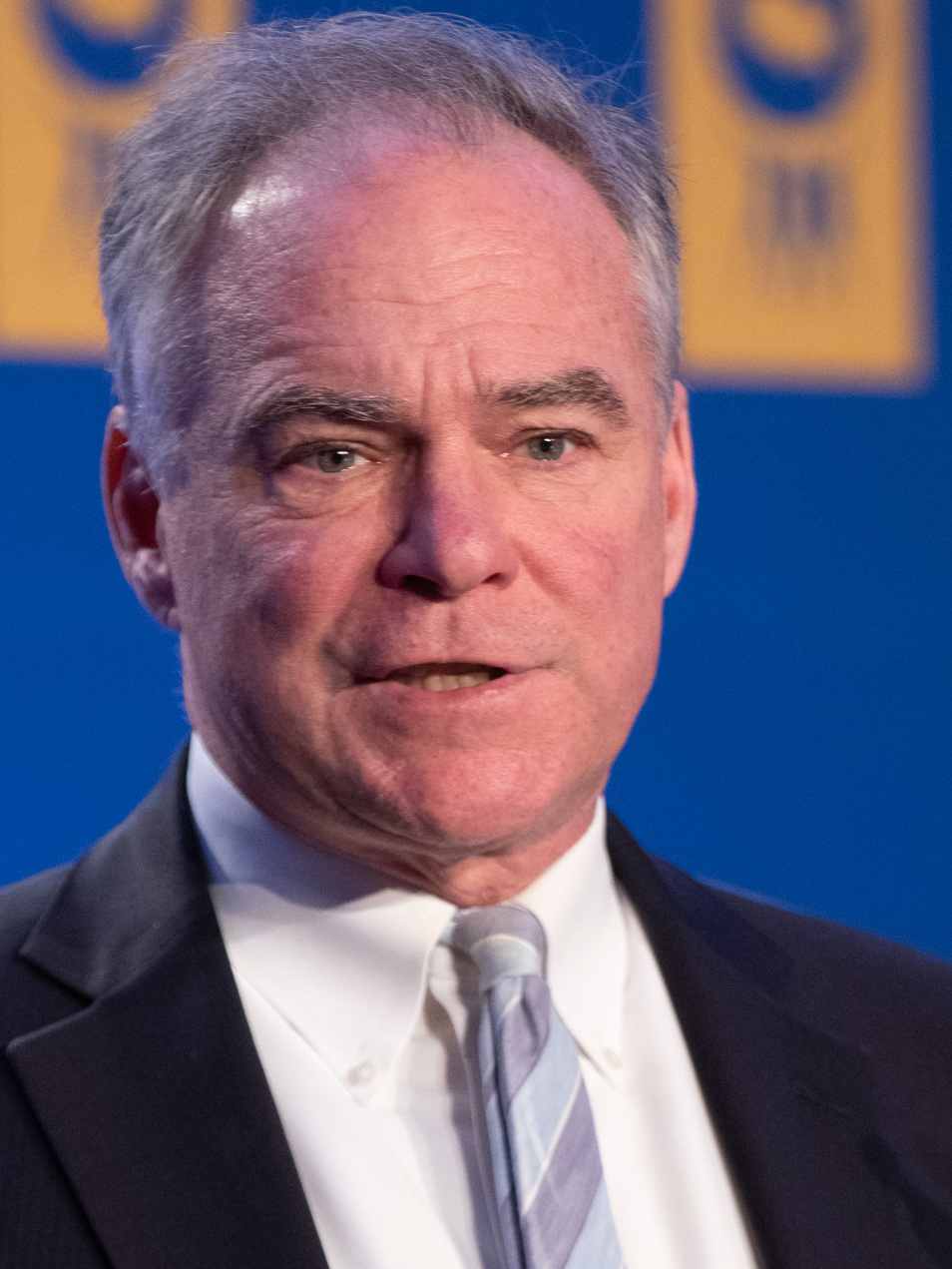
Tim Kaine, U.S. Senator from Virginia and 2016 Democratic VP nominee

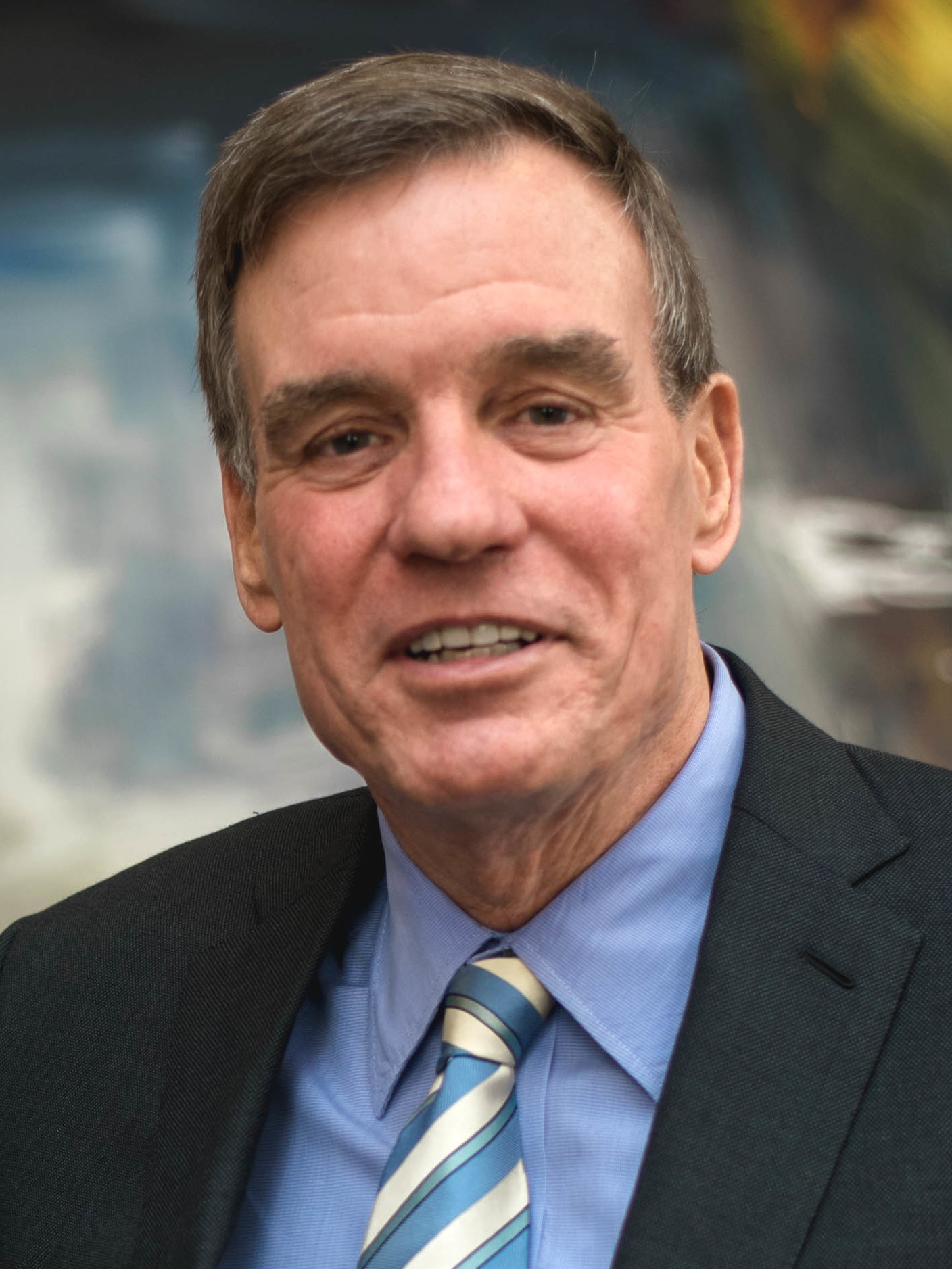
Mark Warner, U.S. Senator from Virginia

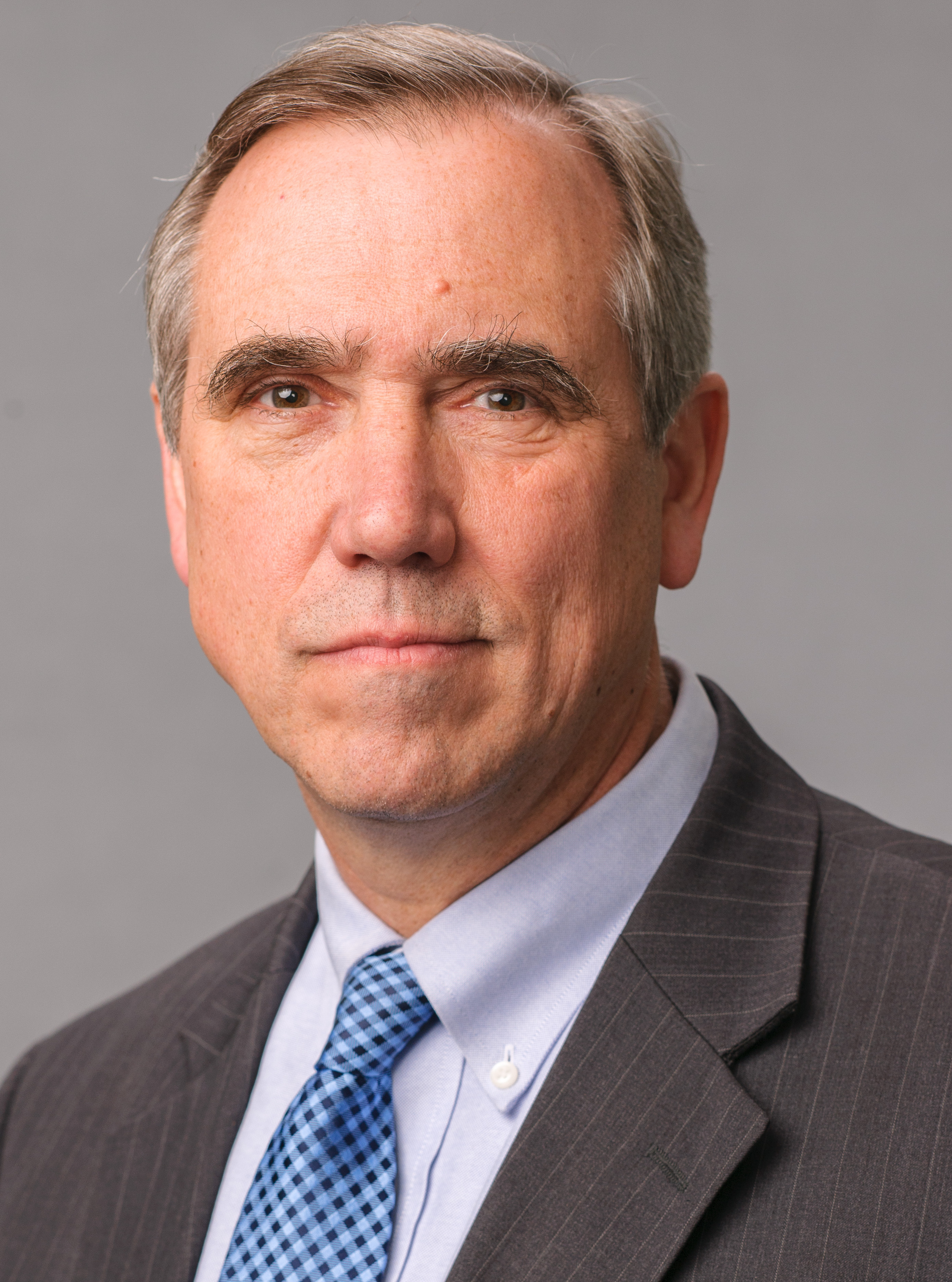
Jeff Merkley, U.S. Senator from Oregon

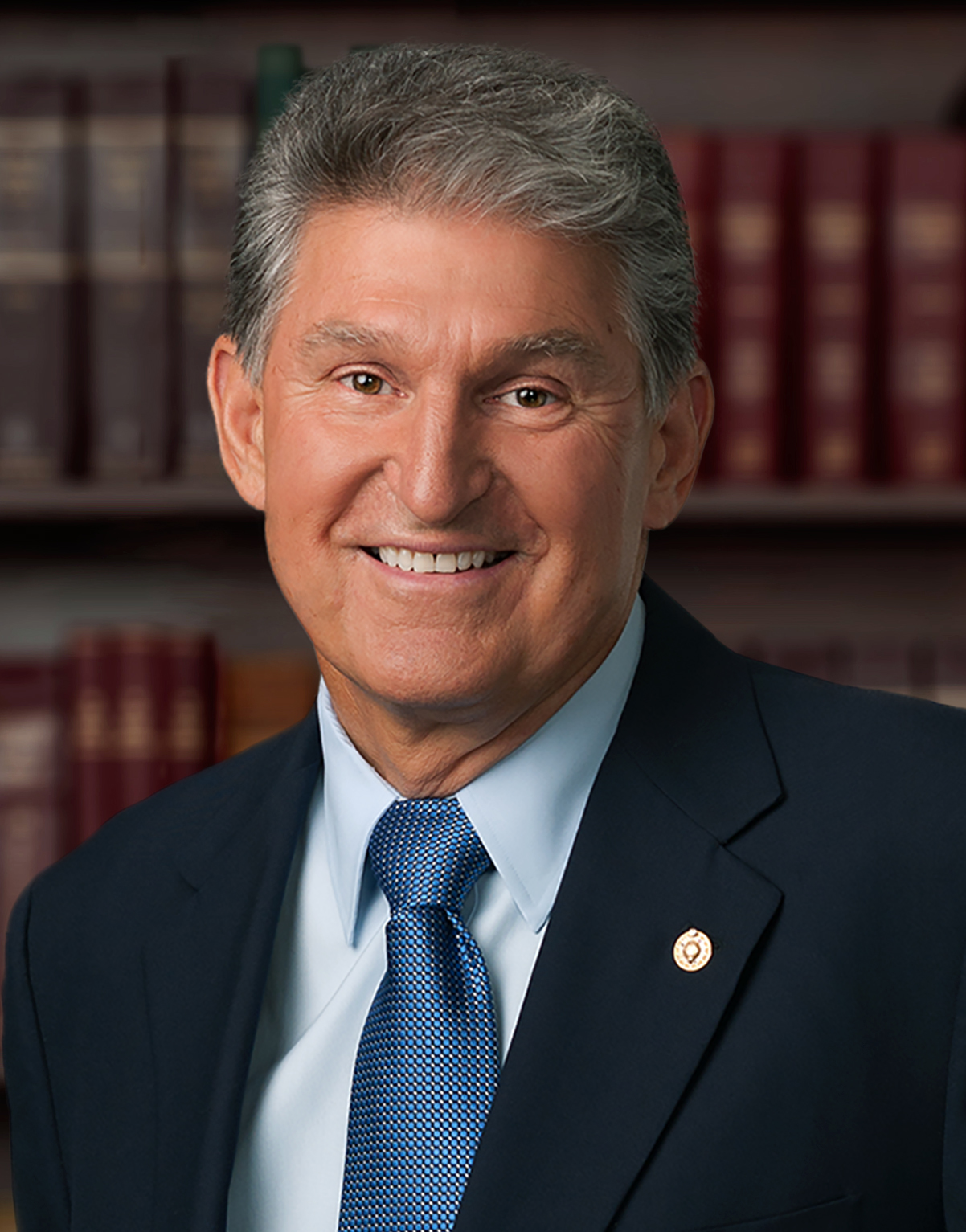
Joe Manchin, U.S. Senator from West Virginia

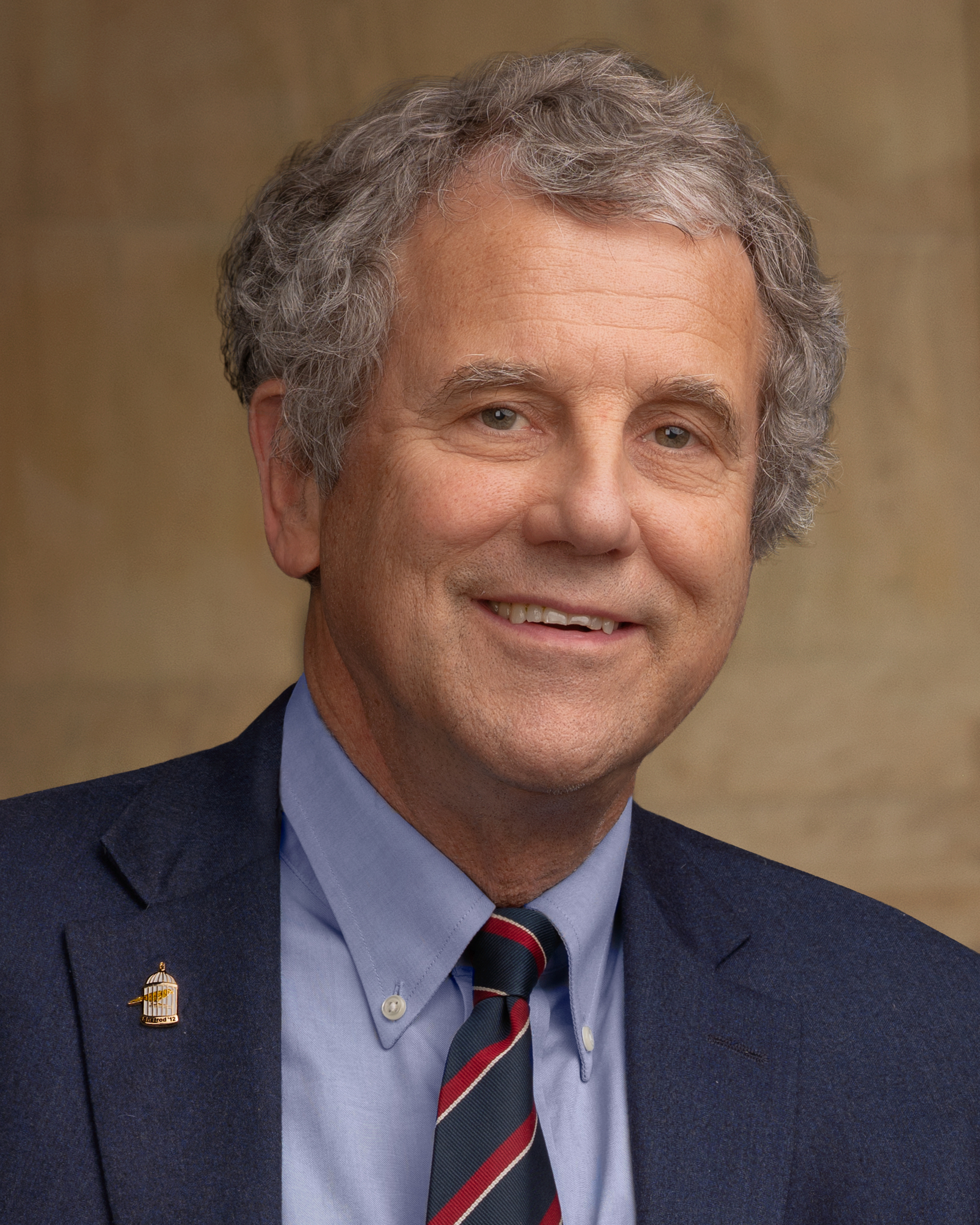
Sherrod Brown, U.S. Senator from Ohio

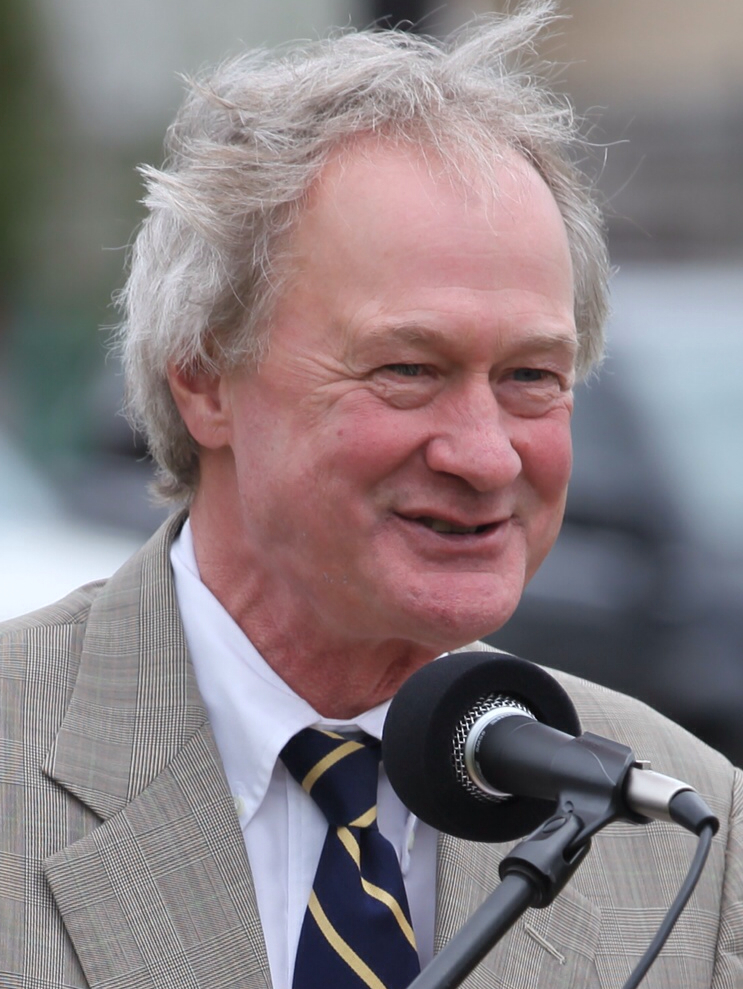
Lincoln Chafee, former Governor of Rhode Island

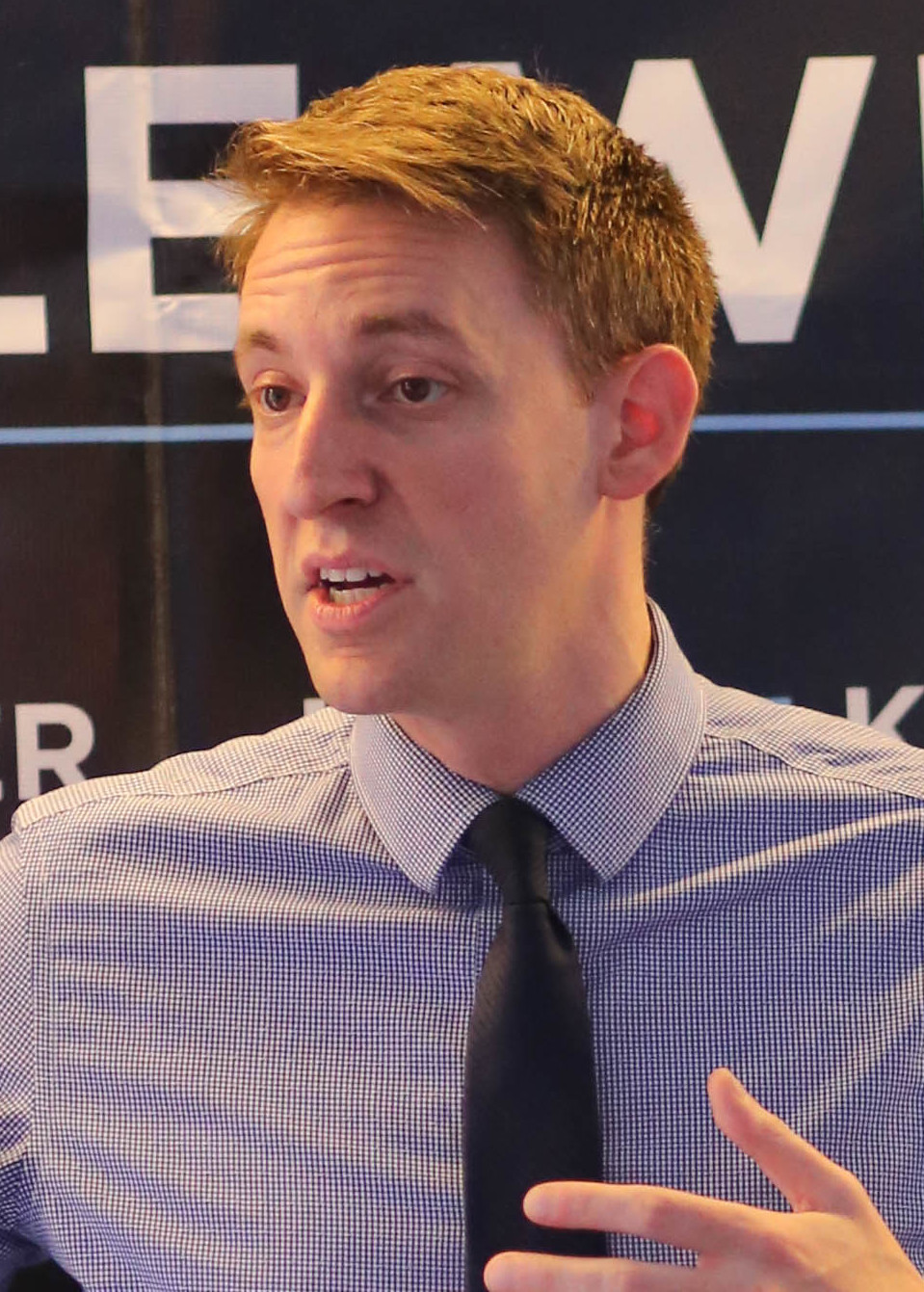
Jason Kander, former Missouri Secretary of State

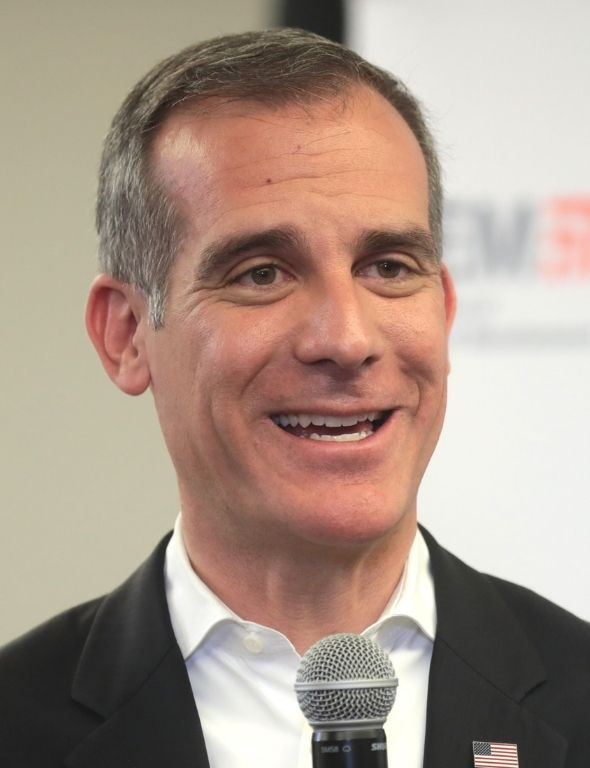
Eric Garcetti, Mayor of Los Angeles

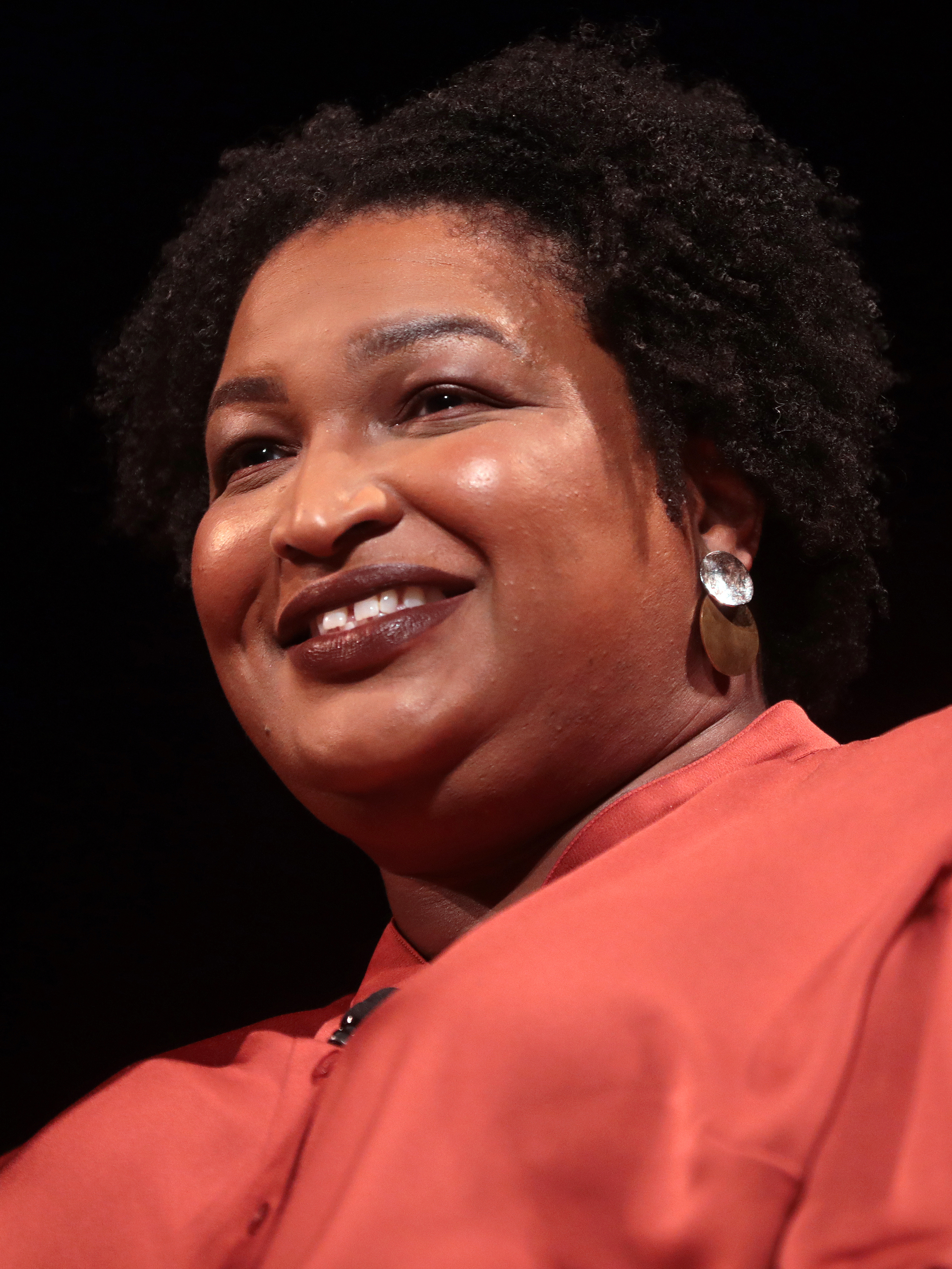
Stacey Abrams, former Minority Leader of the Georgia House of Representatives

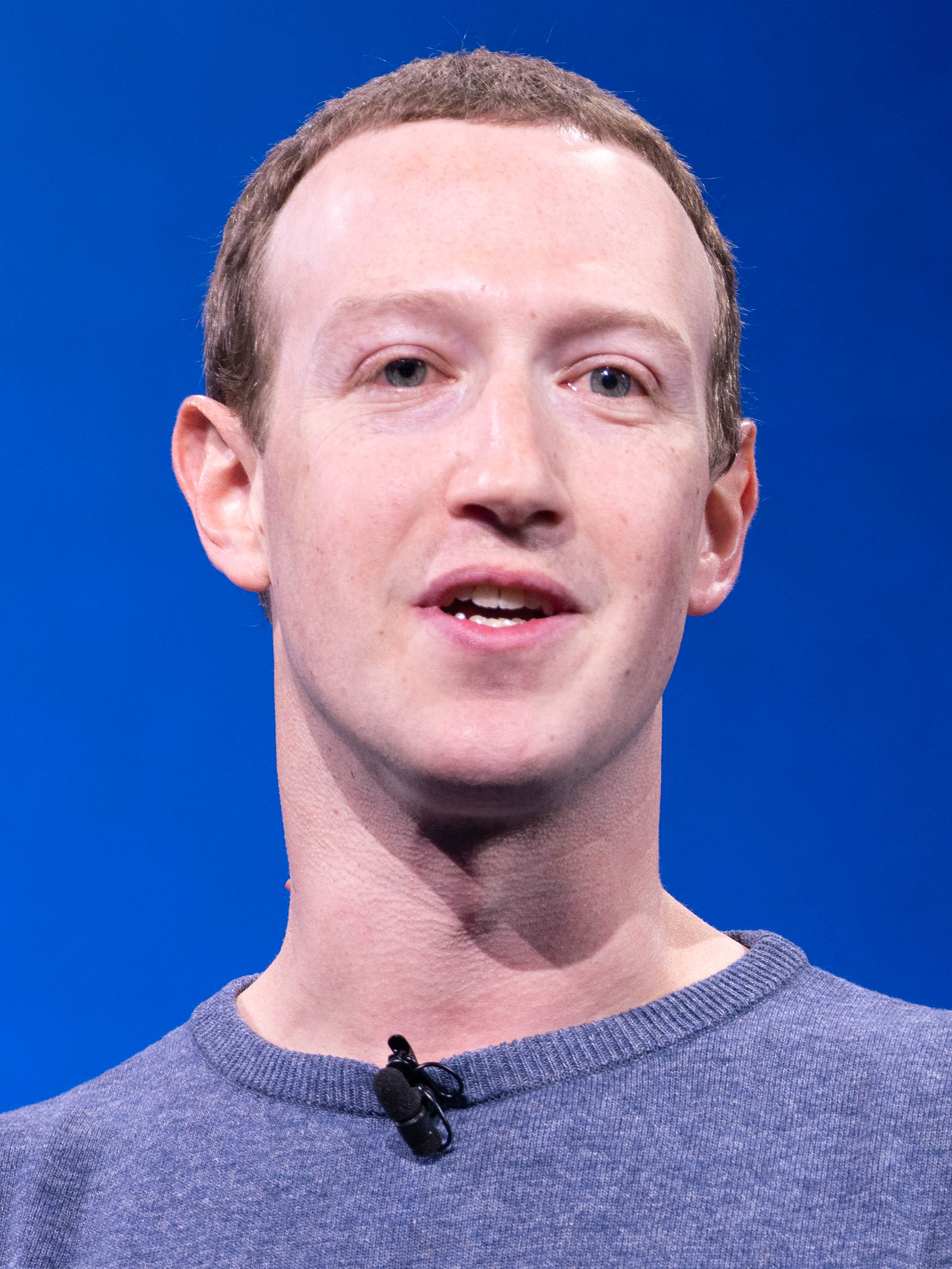
Mark Zuckerberg, CEO of Facebook

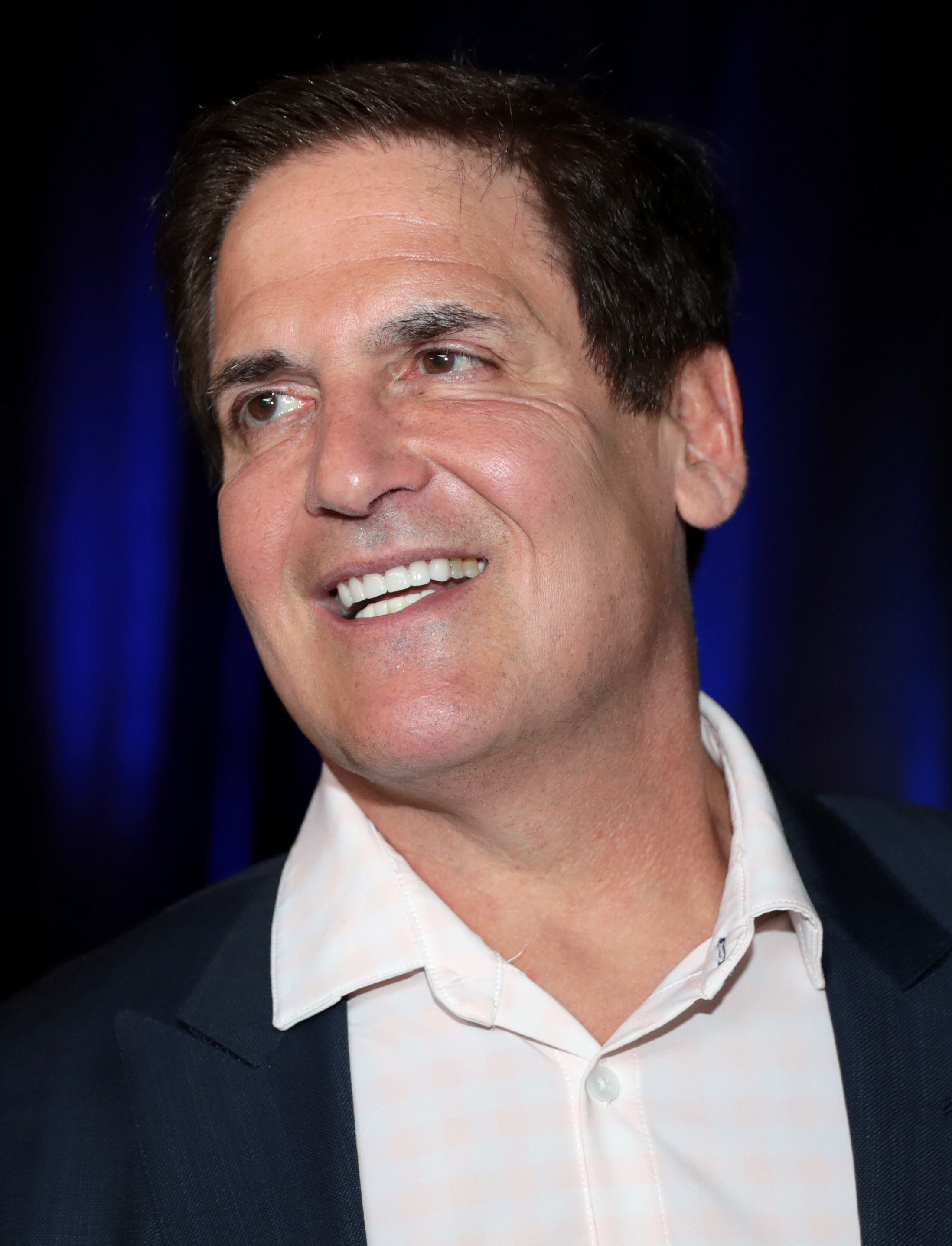
Mark Cuban, Businessman and TV Personality

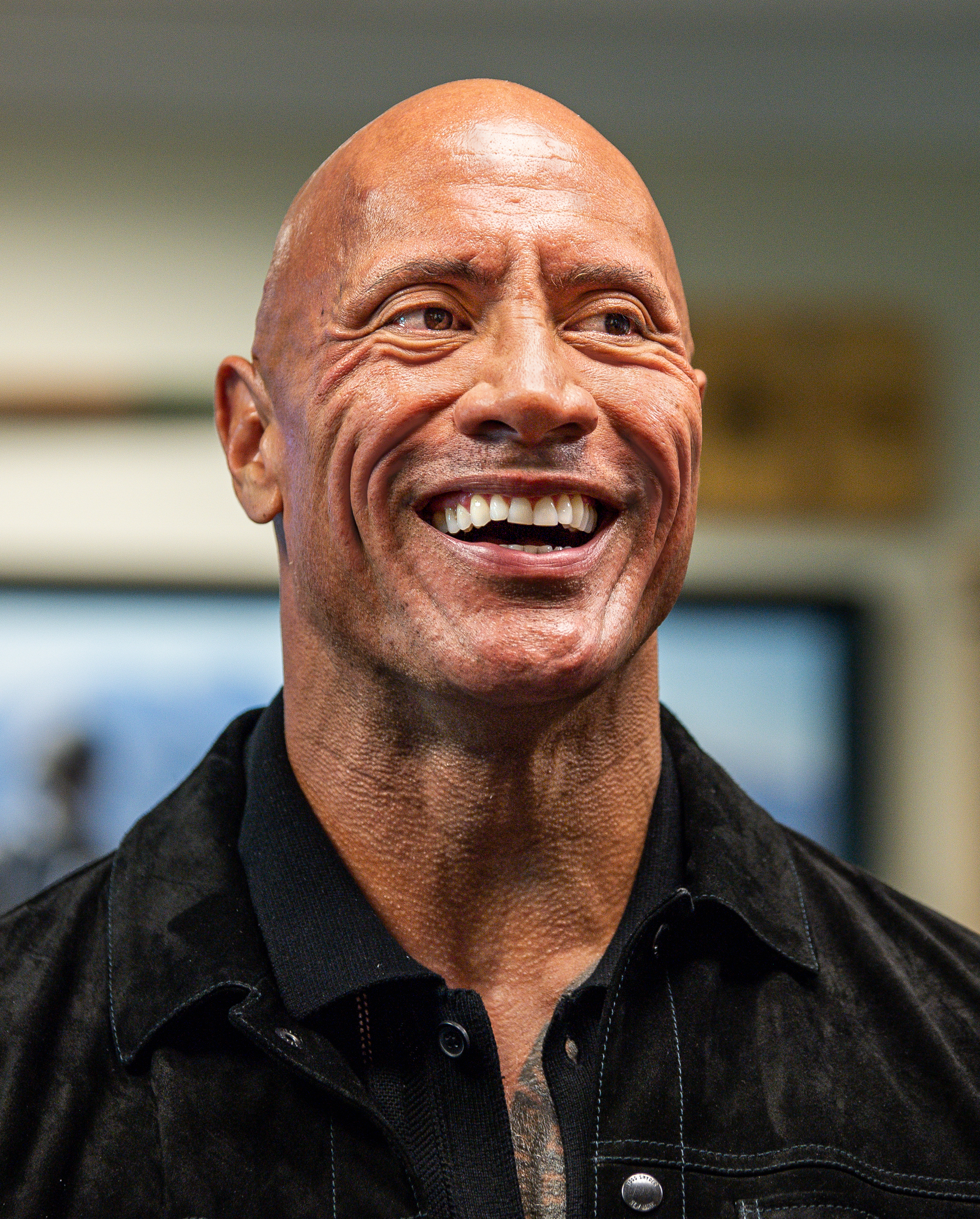
Dwayne "The Rock" Johnson, Actor

== Debates and forums ==
In December 2018, the Democratic National Committee (DNC) announced the schedule for 12 official DNC-sanctioned debates, set to begin in June 2019, with six debates in 2019 and the remaining six during the first four months of 2020. Candidates were allowed to participate in forums featuring multiple other candidates as long as only one candidate appeared on stage at a time. Any presidential candidates who participated in unsanctioned debates with each other would have lost their invitations to the next DNC-sanctioned debate. No unsanctioned debates took place during the 2019–2020 debate season.

The DNC also announced that it would not partner with Fox News as a media sponsor for any debates. Fox News last held a Democratic debate in 2003. All media sponsors selected to host a debate were as a new rule required to appoint at least one female moderator for each debate, to ensure there would not be a gender-skewed treatment of the candidates and debate topics.

Debate schedule
Debate	Date	Time (ET)	Viewers	Location	Sponsor(s)	Moderator(s)
1A	June 26, 2019	9–11 p.m.	~24.3 million (15.3m live TV; 9m streaming)	Arsht Center, Miami, Florida	NBC News; MSNBC; Telemundo	José Díaz-Balart; Savannah Guthrie; Lester Holt; Rachel Maddow; Chuck Todd
1B	June 27, 2019	9–11 p.m.	~27.1 million (18.1m live TV; 9m streaming)	Arsht Center, Miami, Florida	NBC News; MSNBC; Telemundo	José Díaz-Balart; Savannah Guthrie; Lester Holt; Rachel Maddow; Chuck Todd
2A	July 30, 2019	8–10:30 p.m.	~11.5 million (8.7m live TV; 2.8m streaming)	Fox Theatre, Detroit, Michigan	CNN	Dana Bash; Don Lemon; Jake Tapper
2B	July 31, 2019	8–10:30 p.m.	~13.8 million (10.7m live TV; 3.1m streaming)	Fox Theatre, Detroit, Michigan	CNN	Dana Bash; Don Lemon; Jake Tapper
3	September 12, 2019	8–11 p.m.	14.04 million live TV	Health and Physical Education Arena, Texas Southern University, Houston, Texas	ABC News; Univision	Linsey Davis; David Muir; Jorge Ramos; George Stephanopoulos
4	October 15, 2019	8–11 p.m.	~8.8 million (8.34m live TV; 0.45m streaming)	Rike Physical Education Center, Otterbein University, Westerville, Ohio	CNN; The New York Times	Erin Burnett; Anderson Cooper; Marc Lacey
5	November 20, 2019	9–11 p.m.	~7.9 million (6.6m live TV; 1.3m streaming)	Oprah Winfrey sound stage, Tyler Perry Studios, Atlanta, Georgia	MSNBC; The Washington Post	Rachel Maddow; Andrea Mitchell; Ashley Parker; Kristen Welker
6	December 19, 2019	8–11 p.m.	~14.6 million (6.17m live TV; 8.4m streaming)	Gersten Pavilion, Loyola Marymount University, Los Angeles, California	PBS; Politico	Tim Alberta; Yamiche Alcindor; Amna Nawaz; Judy Woodruff
7	January 14, 2020	9–11:15 p.m.	~11.3 million (7.3m live TV; 4.0m streaming)	Sheslow Auditorium, Drake University, Des Moines, Iowa	CNN; The Des Moines Register	Wolf Blitzer; Brianne Pfannenstiel; Abby Phillip
8	February 7, 2020	8–10:30 p.m.	~11.0 million (7.8m live TV; 3.2m streaming)	Thomas F. Sullivan Arena, Saint Anselm College, Manchester, New Hampshire	ABC News; WMUR-TV; Apple News	Linsey Davis; Monica Hernandez; David Muir; Adam Sexton; George Stephanopoulos
9	February 19, 2020	9–11 p.m.	~33.16 million (19.66m live TV; 13.5m streaming)	Le Théâtre des Arts, Paris Las Vegas, Paradise, Nevada	NBC News; MSNBC; Telemundo; The Nevada Independent	Vanessa Hauc; Lester Holt; Hallie Jackson; Jon Ralston; Chuck Todd
10	February 25, 2020	8–10 p.m.	~30.4 million (15.3m live TV; 15.1m streaming)	Gaillard Center, Charleston, South Carolina	CBS News; BET; Twitter; Congressional Black Caucus Institute	Margaret Brennan; Major Garrett; Gayle King; Norah O'Donnell; Bill Whitaker
11	March 15, 2020	8–10 p.m.	~11.4 million (10.8m live TV; 0.6m streaming)	CNN studio Washington, D.C.	CNN; Univision; Congressional Hispanic Caucus BOLD	Dana Bash; Ilia Calderón; Jake Tapper

== Primary election polling ==
The following graph depicts the standing of each candidate in the poll aggregators from December 2018 to April 2020.

View source data.

== Timeline ==
Nominee
Exploratory committee
Suspended campaign
Midterm elections
Iowa caucuses
New Hampshire primary
South Carolina primary
Super; Tuesday
National emergency declared due to COVID-19
Wisconsin primary
Democratic convention
Won election

== Ballot access ==
Filing for the primaries began in October 2019. Yes indicates that the candidate was on the ballot for the primary contest, indicates that the candidate was a recognized write-in candidate, and No indicates that the candidate did not appear on the ballot in that state's contest. indicates that a candidate withdrew before the election but was still listed on the ballot.

Primaries and caucuses
State/ Territory	Date	Biden	Sanders	Gabbard	Warren	Bloomberg	Klobuchar	Buttigieg	Steyer	Patrick	Bennet	Yang	Other	Ref
IA (Note: Caucus)	Feb 3	Ballot access not required												
NH	Feb 11	Biden-Yes	Gabbard-Yes	Sanders-Yes	Warren-Yes	Bloomberg-Recognized Write-in	Klobuchar-Yes	Buttigieg-Yes	Steyer-Yes	Patrick-Yes	Bennet-Yes	Yang-Yes	(Note: Cory Booker, Mosie Boyd, Steve Bullock, Steve Burke, Julián Castro, Roque De La Fuente III, John Delaney, Jason Dunlap, Michael A. Ellinger, Ben Gleib, Mark Greenstein, Kamala Harris, Henry Hewes, Tom Koos, Lorenz Kraus, Rita Krichevsky, Raymond Moroz, Joe Sestak, Sam Sloan, David Thistle, Thomas Torgeson, Robby Wells, and Marianne Williamson)	
NV	Feb 22	Biden-Yes	Gabbard-Yes	Sanders-Yes	Warren-Yes	Bloomberg-No	Klobuchar-Yes	Buttigieg-Yes	Steyer-Yes	Patrick-Withdrawn	Bennet-Withdrawn	Yang-Withdrawn	(Note: John Delaney)	
SC	Feb 29	Biden-Yes	Gabbard-Yes	Sanders-Yes	Warren-Yes	Bloomberg-No	Klobuchar-Yes	Buttigieg-Yes	Steyer-Yes	Patrick-Withdrawn	Bennet-Withdrawn	Yang-Withdrawn	(Note: Cory Booker and John Delaney)	
AL	Mar 3	Biden-Yes	Gabbard-Yes	Sanders-Yes	Warren-Yes	Bloomberg-Yes	Klobuchar-Withdrawn	Buttigieg-Withdrawn	Steyer-Withdrawn	Patrick-No	Bennet-Withdrawn	Yang-Withdrawn	(Note: Cory Booker, Julián Castro, John Delaney, and Marianne Williamson)	
AR	Mar 3	Biden-Yes	Gabbard-Yes	Sanders-Yes	Warren-Yes	Bloomberg-Yes	Klobuchar-Withdrawn	Buttigieg-Withdrawn	Steyer-Withdrawn	Patrick-No	Bennet-Withdrawn	Yang-Withdrawn	(Note: Cory Booker, Mosie Boyd, Steve Bullock, Julián Castro, John Delaney, Kamala Harris, Joe Sestak, and Marianne Williamson)	
AS	Mar 3	Biden-Yes	Gabbard-Yes	Sanders-Yes	Warren-Yes	Bloomberg-Yes	Klobuchar-Withdrawn	Buttigieg-Withdrawn	Steyer-Withdrawn	Patrick-Withdrawn	Bennet-No	Yang-Withdrawn	Other–No	
CA	Mar 3	Biden-Yes	Gabbard-Yes	Sanders-Yes	Warren-Yes	Bloomberg-Yes	Klobuchar-Withdrawn	Buttigieg-Withdrawn	Steyer-Withdrawn	Patrick-Withdrawn	Bennet-Withdrawn	Yang-Withdrawn	(Note: Cory Booker, Mosie Boyd, Julián Castro, Roque De La Fuente III, John Delaney, Michael A. Ellinger, Mark Greenstein, Joe Sestak, and Marianne Williamson)	
CO	Mar 3	Biden-Yes	Gabbard-Yes	Sanders-Yes	Warren-Yes	Bloomberg-Yes	Klobuchar-No	Buttigieg-No	Steyer-Withdrawn	Patrick-Withdrawn	Bennet-No	Yang-Withdrawn	(Note: Cory Booker, Roque De La Fuente III, Rita Krichevsky, Robby Wells, and Marianne Williamson)	
ME	Mar 3	Biden-Yes	Gabbard-Yes	Sanders-Yes	Warren-Yes	Bloomberg-Yes	Klobuchar-Withdrawn	Buttigieg-Withdrawn	Steyer-Withdrawn	Patrick-Withdrawn	Bennet-No	Yang-Yes, Withdrawn	(Note: Cory Booker and Marianne Williamson)	
MA	Mar 3	Biden-Yes	Gabbard-Yes	Sanders-Yes	Warren-Yes	Bloomberg-Yes	Klobuchar-Withdrawn	Buttigieg-Withdrawn	Steyer-Withdrawn	Patrick-Withdrawn	Bennet-Withdrawn	Yang-Withdrawn	Other–Withdrawn	
MN	Mar 3	Biden-Yes	Gabbard-Yes	Sanders-Yes	Warren-Yes	Bloomberg-Yes	Klobuchar-Withdrawn	Buttigieg-Withdrawn	Steyer-Withdrawn	Patrick-Withdrawn	Bennet-Withdrawn	Yang-Withdrawn	Other–Withdrawn	
NC	Mar 3	Biden-Yes	Gabbard-Yes	Sanders-Yes	Warren-Yes	Bloomberg-Yes	Klobuchar-Withdrawn	Buttigieg-Withdrawn	Steyer-Withdrawn	Patrick-Withdrawn	Bennet-Withdrawn	Yang-Withdrawn	Other–Withdrawn	
OK	Mar 3	Biden-Yes	Gabbard-Yes	Sanders-Yes	Warren-Yes	Bloomberg-Yes	Klobuchar-Withdrawn	Buttigieg-Withdrawn	Steyer-Withdrawn	Patrick-Withdrawn	Bennet-Withdrawn	Yang-Withdrawn	(Note: Cory Booker, Julián Castro, and Marianne Williamson)	
TN	Mar 3	Biden-Yes	Gabbard-Yes	Sanders-Yes	Warren-Yes	Bloomberg-Yes	Klobuchar-Withdrawn	Buttigieg-Withdrawn	Steyer-Withdrawn	Patrick-Withdrawn	Bennet-Withdrawn	Yang-Withdrawn	Other–Withdrawn	
TX	Mar 3	Biden-Yes	Gabbard-Yes	Sanders-Yes	Warren-Yes	Bloomberg-Yes	Klobuchar-Withdrawn	Buttigieg-Withdrawn	Steyer-Withdrawn	Patrick-Withdrawn	Bennet-Withdrawn	Yang-Withdrawn	(Note: Cory Booker, Julián Castro, Roque De La Fuente III, John Delaney, Robby Wells, and Marianne Williamson)	
UT	Mar 3	Biden-Yes	Gabbard-Yes	Sanders-Yes	Warren-Yes	Bloomberg-Yes	Klobuchar-Withdrawn	Buttigieg-Withdrawn	Steyer-Withdrawn	Patrick-Withdrawn	Bennet-No	Yang-Withdrawn	(Note: Nathan Bloxham, Cory Booker, Julián Castro, Roque De La Fuente III, and Marianne Williamson)	
VT	Mar 3	Biden-Yes	Gabbard-Yes	Sanders-Yes	Warren-Yes	Bloomberg-Yes	Klobuchar-Withdrawn	Buttigieg-Withdrawn	Steyer-Withdrawn	Patrick-Withdrawn	Bennet-Recognized Write-in, Withdrawn	Yang-Withdrawn	(Note: Julián Castro, Mark Greenstein, and Marianne Williamson)	
VA	Mar 3	Biden-Yes	Gabbard-Yes	Sanders-Yes	Warren-Yes	Bloomberg-Yes	Klobuchar-Withdrawn	Buttigieg-Withdrawn	Steyer-Withdrawn	Patrick-Withdrawn	Bennet-Withdrawn	Yang-Withdrawn	Other–Withdrawn	
DA	Mar 3 – Mar 10	Biden-Yes	Gabbard-Yes	Sanders-Yes	Warren-Withdrawn	Bloomberg-Withdrawn	Klobuchar-Withdrawn	Buttigieg-Withdrawn	Steyer-Withdrawn	Patrick-Withdrawn	Bennet-No	Yang-Withdrawn	Other-No	
ID	Mar 10	Biden-Yes	Gabbard-Yes	Sanders-Yes	Warren-Withdrawn	Bloomberg-Withdrawn	Klobuchar-Withdrawn	Buttigieg-Withdrawn	Steyer-Withdrawn	Patrick-Withdrawn	Bennet-Withdrawn	Yang-Withdrawn	(Note: Cory Booker, Steve Burke, Julián Castro, Roque De La Fuente III, John Delaney, and Marianne Williamson)	
MI	Mar 10	Biden-Yes	Gabbard-Yes	Sanders-Yes	Warren-Withdrawn	Bloomberg-Withdrawn	Klobuchar-Withdrawn	Buttigieg-Withdrawn	Steyer-Withdrawn	Patrick-No	Bennet-Withdrawn	Yang-Withdrawn	(Note: Cory Booker, Julián Castro, John Delaney, Joe Sestak, and Marianne Williamson)	
MS	Mar 10	Biden-Yes	Gabbard-Yes	Sanders-Yes	Warren-Withdrawn	Bloomberg-Withdrawn	Klobuchar-Withdrawn	Buttigieg-Withdrawn	Steyer-Withdrawn	Patrick-Withdrawn	Bennet-No	Yang-Withdrawn	Other–No	
MO	Mar 10	Biden-Yes	Gabbard-Yes	Sanders-Yes	Warren-Withdrawn	Bloomberg-Withdrawn	Klobuchar-Withdrawn	Buttigieg-Withdrawn	Steyer-Withdrawn	Patrick-Withdrawn	Bennet-Withdrawn	Yang-Withdrawn	(Note: Cory Booker, Steve Burke, Julián Castro, Roque De La Fuente III, John Delaney, Bill Haas, Henry Hewes, Leonard J. Steinman II, Velma Steinman, Robby Wells, and Marianne Williamson)	
ND	Mar 10	Biden-Yes	Gabbard-Yes	Sanders-Yes	Warren-Withdrawn	Bloomberg-Withdrawn	Klobuchar-Withdrawn	Buttigieg-Withdrawn	Steyer-Withdrawn	Patrick-Withdrawn	Bennet-Withdrawn	Yang-Withdrawn	Other–Withdrawn	
WA	Mar 10	Biden-Yes	Gabbard-Yes	Sanders-Yes	Warren-Withdrawn	Bloomberg-Withdrawn	Klobuchar-Withdrawn	Buttigieg-Withdrawn	Steyer-Withdrawn	Patrick-Withdrawn	Bennet-Withdrawn	Yang-Withdrawn	Other–Withdrawn	
MP	Mar 14	Biden-Yes	Sanders-Yes	Gabbard-No	Warren-No	Bloomberg-No	Klobuchar-No	Buttigieg-No	Steyer-No	Patrick-No	Bennet-No	Yang-No	Other-No	
AZ	Mar 17	Biden-Yes	Gabbard-Yes	Sanders-Yes	Warren-Withdrawn	Bloomberg-Withdrawn	Klobuchar-Withdrawn	Buttigieg-Withdrawn	Steyer-Withdrawn	Patrick-Withdrawn	Bennet-Withdrawn	Yang-Withdrawn	(Note: Cory Booker, Julián Castro, Roque De La Fuente III, John Delaney, Michael A. Ellinger, Henry Hewes, and Marianne Williamson)	
FL	Mar 17	Biden-Yes	Gabbard-Yes	Sanders-Yes	Warren-Withdrawn	Bloomberg-Withdrawn	Klobuchar-Withdrawn	Buttigieg-Withdrawn	Steyer-Withdrawn	Patrick-Withdrawn	Bennet-Withdrawn	Yang-Withdrawn	Other–Withdrawn	
IL	Mar 17	Biden-Yes	Gabbard-Yes	Sanders-Yes	Warren-Withdrawn	Bloomberg-Withdrawn	Klobuchar-No	Buttigieg-Withdrawn	Steyer-Withdrawn	Patrick-Withdrawn	Bennet-Withdrawn	Yang-Withdrawn	Other–Withdrawn	
WI	Apr 7	Biden-Yes	Sanders-Yes	Gabbard-Withdrawn	Warren-Withdrawn	Bloomberg-Withdrawn	Klobuchar-Withdrawn	Buttigieg-Withdrawn	Steyer-Withdrawn	Patrick-Withdrawn	Bennet-Withdrawn	Yang-Withdrawn	Other–Withdrawn	
AK	Apr 10	Biden-Yes	Sanders-Withdrawn	Gabbard-Withdrawn	Warren-Withdrawn	Bloomberg-Withdrawn	Klobuchar-Withdrawn	Buttigieg-Withdrawn	Steyer-Withdrawn	Patrick-No	Bennet-No	Yang-No	Other–No	
WY	Apr 17	Biden-Yes	Sanders-Withdrawn	Gabbard-Withdrawn	Warren-Withdrawn	Bloomberg-Withdrawn	Klobuchar-Withdrawn	Buttigieg-Withdrawn	Steyer-Withdrawn	Patrick-No	Bennet-No	Yang-No	Other–No	
OH	Apr 28	Biden-Yes	Sanders-Withdrawn	Gabbard-Withdrawn	Warren-Withdrawn	Bloomberg-Withdrawn	Klobuchar-Withdrawn	Buttigieg-Withdrawn	Steyer-Withdrawn	Patrick-Withdrawn	Bennet-Withdrawn	Yang-Recognized Write-in, Withdrawn	Other–No	
KS	May 2	Biden-Yes	Sanders-Withdrawn	Gabbard-Withdrawn	Warren-Withdrawn	Bloomberg-No	Klobuchar-No	Buttigieg-No	Steyer-No	Patrick-No	Bennet-No	Yang-No	Other-No	
NE	May 12	Biden-Yes	Sanders-Withdrawn	Gabbard-Withdrawn	Warren-Withdrawn	Bloomberg-No	Klobuchar-No	Buttigieg-No	Steyer-No	Patrick-No	Bennet-No	Yang-No	Other-No	
OR	May 19	Biden-Yes	Sanders-Withdrawn	Gabbard-Withdrawn	Warren-Withdrawn	Bloomberg-No	Klobuchar-No	Buttigieg-No	Steyer-No	Patrick-No	Bennet-No	Yang-No	Other-No	
HI	May 22	Biden-Yes	Sanders-Withdrawn	Gabbard-Withdrawn	Warren-Withdrawn	Bloomberg-Withdrawn	Klobuchar-Withdrawn	Buttigieg-Withdrawn	Steyer-Withdrawn	Patrick-Withdrawn	Bennet-No	Yang-Withdrawn	Other–No	
DC	Jun 2	Biden-Yes	Sanders-Withdrawn	Gabbard-Withdrawn	Warren-Withdrawn	Bloomberg-No	Klobuchar-No	Buttigieg-No	Steyer-No	Patrick-No	Bennet-No	Yang-No	Other-No	
IN	Jun 2	Biden-Yes	Sanders-Withdrawn	Gabbard-Withdrawn	Warren-Withdrawn	Bloomberg-Withdrawn	Klobuchar-Withdrawn	Buttigieg-Withdrawn	Steyer-Withdrawn	Patrick-No	Bennet-No	Yang-Withdrawn	Other-No	
MD	Jun 2	Biden-Yes	Sanders-Withdrawn	Gabbard-Withdrawn	Warren-Withdrawn	Bloomberg-Withdrawn	Klobuchar-Withdrawn	Buttigieg-Withdrawn	Steyer-Withdrawn	Patrick-Withdrawn	Bennet-Withdrawn	Yang-Withdrawn	Other–Withdrawn	
MT	Jun 2	Biden-Yes	Sanders-Withdrawn	Gabbard-No	Warren-Withdrawn	Bloomberg-No	Klobuchar-No	Buttigieg-No	Steyer-No	Patrick-No	Bennet-No	Yang-No	Other-No	
NM	Jun 2	Biden-Yes	Sanders-Withdrawn	Gabbard-Withdrawn	Warren-Withdrawn	Bloomberg-No	Klobuchar-No	Buttigieg-No	Steyer-No	Patrick-Withdrawn	Bennet-No	Yang-Withdrawn	Other-No	
PA	Jun 2	Biden-Yes	Sanders-Withdrawn	Gabbard-Withdrawn	Warren-No	Bloomberg-No	Klobuchar-No	Buttigieg-No	Steyer-No	Patrick-No	Bennet-No	Yang-No	Other-No	
RI	Jun 2	Biden-Yes	Sanders-Withdrawn	Gabbard-Withdrawn	Warren-Withdrawn	Bloomberg-No	Klobuchar-No	Buttigieg-No	Steyer-No	Patrick-No	Bennet-No	Yang-Withdrawn	Other-No	
SD	Jun 2	Biden-Yes	Sanders-Withdrawn	Gabbard-No	Warren-No	Bloomberg-No	Klobuchar-No	Buttigieg-No	Steyer-No	Patrick-No	Bennet-No	Yang-No	Other-No	
GU	Jun 6	Ballot access not required												
VI	Jun 6	Biden-Yes	Sanders-Withdrawn	Gabbard-No	Warren-No	Bloomberg-No	Klobuchar-No	Buttigieg-No	Steyer-No	Patrick-No	Bennet-No	Yang-No	Other–No	
GA	Jun 9	Biden-Yes	Sanders-Withdrawn	Gabbard-Withdrawn	Warren-Withdrawn	Bloomberg-Withdrawn	Klobuchar-Withdrawn	Buttigieg-Withdrawn	Steyer-Withdrawn	Patrick-Withdrawn	Bennet-Withdrawn	Yang-Withdrawn	Other–Withdrawn	
WV	Jun 9	Biden-Yes	Sanders-Withdrawn	Gabbard-Withdrawn	Warren-Withdrawn	Bloomberg-Withdrawn	Klobuchar-Withdrawn	Buttigieg-Withdrawn	Steyer-Withdrawn	Patrick-Withdrawn	Bennet-Withdrawn	Yang-Withdrawn	(Note: David Lee Rice)	
KY	Jun 23	Biden-Yes	Sanders-Withdrawn	Gabbard-Withdrawn	Warren-Withdrawn	Bloomberg-No	Klobuchar-Withdrawn	Buttigieg-Withdrawn	Steyer-Withdrawn	Patrick-Withdrawn	Bennet-Withdrawn	Yang-Withdrawn	Other-No	
NY	Jun 23	Biden-Yes	Sanders-Withdrawn	Gabbard-Withdrawn	Warren-Withdrawn	Bloomberg-Withdrawn	Klobuchar-Withdrawn	Buttigieg-Withdrawn	Steyer-Withdrawn	Patrick-Withdrawn	Bennet-Withdrawn	Yang-Withdrawn	Other-No	
DE	Jul 7	Biden-Yes	Sanders-Withdrawn	Gabbard-No	Warren-Withdrawn	Bloomberg-No	Klobuchar-No	Buttigieg-No	Steyer-No	Patrick-No	Bennet-No	Yang-No	Other-No	
NJ	Jul 7	Biden-Yes	Sanders-Withdrawn	Gabbard-No	Warren-No	Bloomberg-No	Klobuchar-No	Buttigieg-No	Steyer-No	Patrick-No	Bennet-No	Yang-No	Other-No	
LA	Jul 11	Biden-Yes	Sanders-Withdrawn	Gabbard-Withdrawn	Warren-Withdrawn	Bloomberg-Withdrawn	Klobuchar-Withdrawn	Buttigieg-Withdrawn	Steyer-Withdrawn	Patrick-Withdrawn	Bennet-Withdrawn	Yang-Withdrawn	(Note: Steve Burke, John Delaney and Robby Wells)	
PR	Jul 12	Biden-Yes	Sanders-Withdrawn	Gabbard-Withdrawn	Warren-Withdrawn	Bloomberg-Withdrawn	Klobuchar-Withdrawn	Buttigieg-Withdrawn	Steyer-Withdrawn	No	No	No	Other–No	
CT	Aug 11	Biden-Yes	Sanders-Withdrawn	Gabbard-Withdrawn	Warren-Withdrawn	Bloomberg-Withdrawn	Klobuchar-Withdrawn	Buttigieg-Withdrawn	Steyer-Withdrawn	Patrick-No	Bennet-No	Yang-No	Other-No	

Candidates listed in italics have suspended their campaigns.

== National convention ==
The 2020 Democratic National Convention was scheduled to take place in Milwaukee, Wisconsin, on July 13–16, 2020, but was postponed and rescheduled to take place on August 17–20 due to the COVID-19 pandemic.

The event became a virtual "Convention Across America" with voting held online before the opening gavel, and the non-televised events held remotely over ZOOM.

== Campaign finance ==
This is an overview of the money being raised and spent by each campaign for the entire period running from January 1, 2017, to March 31, 2020, as it was reported to the Federal Election Commission (FEC). Total raised is the sum of all individual contributions (large and small), loans from the candidate, and transfers from other campaign committees. The last column, Cash On Hand (COH), has been calculated by subtracting the "spent" amount from the "raised" amount, thereby showing the remaining cash each campaign had available for its future spending as of February 29, 2020. As of February 29, 2020, the major candidates have raised $989,234,992.08.

Candidate who has withdrawn

Campaign finances by candidate
Candidate	Total raised	Individual contributions			Debt	Spent	COH
Candidate	Total raised	Total	Unitemized	Pct	Debt	Spent	COH
Joe Biden	$134,790,836	$134,425,574	$53,187,451	39.57%	$0	$108,403,972	$26,386,865
Michael Bennet	$7,514,313	$6,795,438	$2,336,988	34.39%	$0	$7,343,017	$171,295
Michael Bloomberg	$1,062,963,445	$916,332	$847,932	92.54%	$14,789,537	$1,051,783,859	$11,179,585
Cory Booker	$26,022,021	$22,780,231	$7,706,938	33.83%	$848,391	$25,697,926	$324,095
Steve Bullock	$5,513,606	$5,489,635	$1,753,850	31.95%	$0	$5,426,704	$86,902
Pete Buttigieg	$102,739,747	$101,397,049	$43,744,949	43.14%	$2,726,793	$96,727,933	$6,011,814
Julian Castro	$10,302,020	$10,264,194	$6,620,621	64.50%	$0	$9,740,367	$561,654
Bill de Blasio	$1,423,279	$1,423,240	$142,001	9.98%	$100,351	$1,418,570	$4,709
John Delaney	$29,438,502	$2,582,672	$346,526	13.42%	$1,493,250	$29,418,380	$42,165
Tulsi Gabbard	$15,101,213	$12,423,632	$7,104,998	57.19%	$93,239	$14,461,004	$640,210
Kirsten Gillibrand	$15,951,202	$6,278,790	$1,979,345	31.52%	$0	$14,493,053	$1,458,149
Mike Gravel	$330,059	$330,059	$322,076	97.58%	$0	$249,480	$2,544
Kamala Harris	$41,077,632	$39,259,853	$15,720,913	40.04%	$1,070,014	$40,741,479	$336,153
John Hickenlooper	$3,509,495	$3,352,659	$562,301	16.77%	$0	$3,509,495	$0
Amy Klobuchar	$53,957,026	$49,878,773	$22,256,527	44.62%	$0	$51,675,390	$2,281,636
Jay Inslee	$6,942,575	$6,911,292	$3,455,790	50.00%	$0	$6,895,255	$47,319
Wayne Messam	$126,918	$124,318	$38,835	31.24%	$81,876	$126,918	$0
Seth Moulton	$2,292,043	$1,498,825	$342,499	22.85%	$216,528	$2,285,828	$6,214
Richard Ojeda	$119,478	$77,476	$48,742	62.91%	$44,373	$117,507	$1,971
Beto O'Rourke	$18,533,565	$18,448,678	$9,436,714	51.15%	$10,825	$18,251,127	$282,439
Deval Patrick	$3,105,910	$2,670,871	$271,909	10.18%	$250,000	$3,041,852	$64,058
Tim Ryan	$1,341,246	$1,285,074	$435,025	33.85%	$0	$1,340,943	$304
Bernie Sanders	$214,887,421	$201,327,757	$114,214,155	56.73%	$0	$204,090,570	$16,252,830
Joe Sestak	$449,345	$440,127	$107,003	24.31%	$0	$445,768	$3,577
Tom Steyer	$347,533,363	$3,719,361	$2,505,879	67.37%	$24,000	$347,268,261	$265,219
Eric Swalwell	$2,604,856	$892,373	$340,385	38.14%	$0	$2,604,856	$0
Elizabeth Warren	$128,442,944	$115,863,061	$66,516,352	57.41%	$1,295,996	$123,908,764	$4,534,180
Marianne Williamson	$8,218,677	$8,209,773	$4,698,946	57.24%	$238,180	$8,146,249	$72,428
Andrew Yang	$41,802,018	$41,141,162	$20,455,232	49.72%	$2,010	$41,286,953	$604,061

== Maps ==
Democratic primary and caucus calendar as of March 12, 2020, prior to a number of delays February March 3 (Super Tuesday) March 10 March 14–17 March 24–29 April 4–7 April 28 May June

Democratic primary and caucus calendar by scheduled date after delays due to the COVID-19 pandemic in the United States February March 3 (Super Tuesday) March 10 March 14–17 April 7–17 April 28 May June July–August

Map legend
Joe Biden
Bernie Sanders
Elizabeth Warren
Michael Bloomberg
Pete Buttigieg
Amy Klobuchar
Tom Steyer
Tie

Results by county according to first determining step relevant for delegate allocation. In Iowa, this is State Delegate Equivalents (SDEs) elected at precinct caucuses; in Nevada, this is County Convention Delegates (CCDs). In other states, this is the popular vote for each candidate.

Results by delegate district (usually congressional district) by first preference vote. Darker colors denote greater support for the leading candidate.

== See also ==
- 2020 United States presidential election

National Conventions

- 2020 Democratic National Convention
- 2020 Republican National Convention
- 2020 Libertarian National Convention
- 2020 Green National Convention
- 2020 Constitution Party National Convention

Presidential primaries

- 2020 Republican Party presidential primaries
- 2020 Libertarian Party presidential primaries
- 2020 Green Party presidential primaries
- 2020 Constitution Party presidential primaries
