= 2020 Idaho Democratic presidential primary =

- March 10, 2020

25 delegates (20 pledged, 5 unpledged) to the Democratic National Convention The number of pledged delegates won is determined by the popular vote

Candidate	Joe Biden	Bernie Sanders
Home state	Delaware	Vermont
Delegate count	12	8
Popular vote	53,151	46,114
Percentage	48.92%	42.44%
County results
Joe Biden	Bernie Sanders	Tie

The 2020 Idaho Democratic presidential primary took place on March 10, 2020, as one of several states voting the week after Super Tuesday in the Democratic Party primaries for the 2020 presidential election. The Idaho primary required that voters would be registered Democrats or unaffiliated, and awarded 25 delegates towards the 2020 Democratic National Convention, of whom 20 were pledged delegates allocated on the basis of the primary results.

With only former vice president Joe Biden and senator Bernie Sanders left as relevant candidates after Super Tuesday, Biden won the primary with almost 49% of the vote, one of the narrower results of the day, and picked up 12 delegates over Bernie Sanders, who achieved around 42% of the vote and 8 delegates.

== Procedure ==
Idaho was one of six states (along with Democrats Abroad) that held primaries on March 10, 2020, one week after Super Tuesday. On June 30, 2018, the Idaho Democratic Party announced at its state convention that it would switch from using caucuses to a state-run primary in 2020.

Voting took place throughout the state from 8:00 a.m. until 8:00 p.m. local time. In the primary, candidates had to meet a threshold of 15% at the congressional district or statewide level in order to be considered viable. The 20 pledged delegates to the 2020 Democratic National Convention were allocated proportionally on the basis of the primary results. Of these, between 6 and 7 were allocated to each of the state's 2 congressional districts and another 3 were allocated to party leaders and elected officials (PLEO delegates), in addition to 4 at-large delegates. The March primary as part of Stage I on the primary timetable received no bonus delegates, in order to disperse the primaries between more different date clusters and keep too many states from hoarding on a March date.

On April 4, 2020, county caucuses chose delegates to the state convention in Boise. The state convention on June 6, 2020, elected all 20 pledged delegates for the Democratic National Convention. The delegation also included 5 unpledged PLEO delegates: 5 members of the Democratic National Committee.

Pledged national convention delegates
Type	Del.
CD1	6
CD2	7
PLEO	3
At-large	4
Total pledged delegates	20

== Candidates ==
The following candidates filed, paying a fee of $1,000, and were on the ballot in Idaho:

Running

- Joe Biden
- Steve Burke
- Roque "Rocky" De La Fuente III
- Tulsi Gabbard
- Bernie Sanders

Withdrawn

- Michael Bennet
- Michael Bloomberg (Note: Candidate withdrew during early voting following Super Tuesday.)
- Cory Booker
- Pete Buttigieg (Note: Candidate withdrew during early voting before Super Tuesday.)
- Julian Castro
- John Delaney
- Amy Klobuchar
- Deval Patrick
- Tom Steyer
- Elizabeth Warren
- Marianne Williamson
- Andrew Yang

Kamala Harris and Brian Moore qualified, but had withdrawn early enough so that they were taken from the ballot.

== Polling ==
Poll source	Date(s) administered	Sample size (Note: Key: A – all adults RV – registered voters LV – likely voters V – unclear)	Margin of error	Joe Biden	Tulsi Gabbard	Bernie Sanders	Other	Undecided
Swayable	Mar 8–9, 2020	833 (LV)	± 7%	52%	2%	37%	9%	–
Data for Progress	Mar 7–9, 2020	329 (LV)	± 5.4%	51%	2%	47%	–	–

== Results ==
Results by county Biden—40–50% Biden—50–60% Biden—60–70% Sanders—40–50% Sanders—50–60% Tie—30–40%

2020 Idaho Democratic presidential primary
Candidate	Votes	%	Delegates
Joe Biden	53,151	48.92	12
Bernie Sanders	46,114	42.44	8
Elizabeth Warren (withdrawn)	2,878	2.65	
Michael Bloomberg (withdrawn)	2,612	2.40	
Pete Buttigieg (withdrawn)	1,426	1.31	
Tulsi Gabbard	876	0.81	
Amy Klobuchar (withdrawn)	774	0.71	
Andrew Yang (withdrawn)	310	0.29	
Tom Steyer (withdrawn)	112	0.10	
Michael Bennet (withdrawn)	91	0.08	
John Delaney (withdrawn)	65	0.06	
Marianne Williamson (withdrawn)	57	0.05	
Cory Booker (withdrawn)	55	0.05	
Julian Castro (withdrawn)	49	0.05	
Deval Patrick (withdrawn)	19	0.02	
Other candidates	60	0.06	
Total	108,649	100%	20

== See also ==
- 2020 Idaho Republican presidential primary
