= 2020 Wyoming Democratic presidential caucuses =

- April 17, 2020

18 delegates (14 pledged, 4 unpledged) to the Democratic National Convention The number of pledged delegates won is determined by the popular vote

Candidate	Joe Biden	Bernie Sanders (withdrawn)
Home state	Delaware	Vermont
Delegate count	10	4
First round	10,105 (65.66%)	3,680 (23.91%)
Final round	10,912 (70.90%)	4,206 (27.33%)
County results
Biden
50–60%
60–70%
70–80%
80–90%

Pledged national convention delegates
Type	Del.
PLEO	2
At-large	12
Total pledged delegates	14

The 2020 Wyoming Democratic presidential caucuses had been scheduled to take place on April 4, 2020 in the Democratic Party primaries and caucuses for the 2020 presidential election, but in-person voting was cancelled due to the COVID-19 pandemic and mail-in voting was extended to April 17, 2020. The Wyoming caucuses were a closed caucus, with the state awarding 18 delegates to the 2020 Democratic National Convention, of which 14 were pledged delegates allocated on the basis of the results of the caucus. Voters cast ranked-choice voting ballots, with a voter's ballot counting for four ranked backup choices if their original choice was in last place and below the 15 percent threshold for winning delegates.

Former vice president and presumptive nominee Joe Biden won the primary, taking almost 71% of the vote and 10 delegates after the distribution of preferences, compared to senator Bernie Sanders' 27% and 4 delegates. On the count of first choices, Biden and Sanders had taken approximately 66% and 24% of the vote, while 9% were spread between six other candidates who had withdrawn from the race, including 4% for senator Elizabeth Warren. On the final count, around 2% of votes were inactive, as they did not include a choice for one of the candidates that had overcome the 15 percent hurdle.

== Procedure ==
The Wyoming Democratic Party published its final approved delegate selection plan on October 9, 2019, outlining that April 4, a Saturday, would be the first determining date for its party-run 2020 caucuses (along with the Alaska, Hawaii and Louisiana primaries on the same day) and voting would be done with ranked-choice votes. Only registered Democrats (defined as all persons residing in the county and registered to vote as Democrats at least by March 20) were able to vote in the election, and they could have either chosen to vote: by mail (originally from January 30 to March 20), at the voter station of their county on March 28, or at the caucus event itself on April 4. Voters who wished to participate in the caucus event on April 4 and cast their vote by a specifically marked "caucus day ballot" would not have been eligible to do so if they prior to the event had voted by mail or at a voter station. Because of the COVID-19 pandemic the party decided on March 22, 2020 that all voting had to occur by mail instead and that ballots received by April 17 would be counted.

County caucuses would have begun across the state at 11:00 a.m. on April 4. In the closed caucuses, candidates had to meet a threshold of 15 percent statewide in order to be considered viable. The 14 pledged delegates to the 2020 Democratic National Convention were allocated proportionally on the basis of the results of the caucus. Of these, 8 district delegates would have corresponded to the result of the statewide vote (coterminous with Wyoming's sole congressional district) and another 2 were allocated to party leaders and elected officials (PLEO delegates), in addition to 4 at-large delegates, both also according to the statewide result. Instead of applying the typical divide between district and statewide delegates, 12 of the state's 14 pledged delegates were all pooled as statewide at-large delegates (preventing two separate calculations with two different rounding errors, which could alter the result but ultimately did not so), in addition to the 2 statewide PLEO delegates. Originally planned with 13 delegates, the final number included a 10% bonus of 1 additional delegate on the 8 district and 3 at-large delegates by the Democratic National Committee due to the April date, which belonged to Stage II on the primary timetable.

The county caucuses, which would have held the presidential preference vote, also elected, electronically, delegates to the state convention, and had to be held until May 24, 2020. The state convention was held on June 6, 2020 and voted on all pledged delegates for the Democratic National Convention. The delegation also included 4 unpledged PLEO delegates: 4 members of the Democratic National Committee.

== Candidates ==
The following individuals appeared on the ballot in Wyoming:

Running

- Joe Biden

Withdrawn

- Michael Bloomberg
- Pete Buttigieg
- Tulsi Gabbard
- Amy Klobuchar
- Bernie Sanders
- Tom Steyer
- Elizabeth Warren

There was also an "undeclared" option.

== Results ==
2020 Wyoming Democratic presidential primary final results
Candidate	Votes	%	Delegates
Joe Biden	10,912	70.90	10
Bernie Sanders (withdrawn)	4,206	27.33	4
Inactive votes (Note: Votes which had all its 5 ranked vote-choices allocated towards eliminated candidates who did not reach the threshold of 15%.)	273	1.77	
Total	15,391	100%	14

Vote count by round
Candidate	Round 1		Round 2		Round 3		Round 4		Round 5		Round 6		Round 7		Round 8	
Candidate	Votes	%	Votes	%	Votes	%	Votes	%	Votes	%	Votes	%	Votes	%	Votes	%
Joe Biden	10,105	65.66	10,118	65.76	10,151	66.11	10,163	66.67	10,215	67.07	10,294	67.65	10,481	69.04	10,912	72.18
Bernie Sanders (withdrawn)	3,680	23.91	3,685	23.95	3,715	24.20	3,729	24.46	3,738	24.54	3,773	24.80	3,822	25.18	4,206	27.82
Elizabeth Warren (withdrawn)	689	4.48	693	4.50	698	4.55	701	4.60	745	4.89	767	5.04	877	5.78	Eliminated	
Pete Buttigieg (withdrawn)	294	1.91	299	1.94	314	2.05	322	2.11	355	2.33	382	2.51	Eliminated			
Michael Bloomberg (withdrawn)	154	1.00	162	1.05	166	1.08	167	1.10	178	1.17	Eliminated					
Amy Klobuchar (withdrawn)	140	0.91	144	0.94	156	1.02	162	1.06	Eliminated							
Undeclared	148	0.96	149	0.97	154	1.00	Eliminated									
Tulsi Gabbard (withdrawn)	134	0.87	136	0.88	Eliminated											
Tom Steyer (withdrawn)	47	0.31	Eliminated													
Total	15,391	100%	15,386	99.97%	15,354	99.8%	15,244	99.0%	15,231	99.0%	15,216	98.9%	15,180	98.6%	15,118	98.2%
