= 2020 Northern Mariana Islands presidential caucuses =

- 2020 Northern Mariana Islands Democratic presidential caucus
- March 14, 2020

11 delegates (6 pledged, 5 unpledged) to the Democratic National Convention The number of pledged delegates won is determined by the popular vote

Candidate	Bernie Sanders	Joe Biden
Home state	Vermont	Delaware
Delegate count	4	2
Popular vote	84	48
Percentage	62.69%	35.82%
- 2020 Northern Mariana Islands Republican presidential caucus
- March 15, 2020

9 bound delegates to the Republican National Convention The delegates won are determined by a winner-takes-all vote
Candidate	Donald Trump
Home state	Florida
Delegate count	9
Popular vote	uncontested
Percentage	100%

Although the Northern Mariana Islands did not participate in the 2020 presidential election because it is a U.S. territory and not a state, it still participated in the U.S. presidential primaries and caucuses. Senator Bernie Sanders won the Democratic caucus, held on March 14, which would be his last win in the 2020 primary season. The Republican caucus, held on March 15 during the party's commonwealth convention, unanimously voted for incumbent President Donald Trump.

== Democratic caucus ==
The 2020 Northern Mariana Islands Democratic presidential caucus took place on March 14, 2020, a Saturday, in the Democratic Party primaries for the 2020 presidential election and was the only contest to vote on that day, in between the two Tuesdays which followed Super Tuesday. The Northern Marianas caucus was a closed caucus and awarded 11 delegates towards the 2020 Democratic National Convention, of which 6 were pledged delegates allocated on the basis of the results of the caucus. The caucus was held at the Saipan World Resort and was organized by the Northern Mariana Islands Democratic Party.

=== Procedure ===
When the Northern Mariana Islands Democratic Party had published its draft delegate selection plan in July 2019, it specified a March 14 date for the 2020 caucus.

In the open caucus, candidates had to meet a threshold of 15 percent across the territory to be considered viable. The 6 pledged delegates to the 2020 Democratic National Convention were allocated proportionally as at-large delegates on the basis of the results of the caucus. The March caucus as part of Stage I on the primary timetable received no bonus delegates, in order to disperse the primaries and caucuses between more different date clusters and keep too many states from hoarding on the first shared date or on a March date in general.

The delegation also included 5 unpledged PLEO delegates: 4 members of the Democratic National Committee and one member of Congress, House of Representatives nonvoting delegate Gregorio Sablan.

=== Candidates ===
Several, if not all major candidates participating in the Democratic primaries had been planned for the caucus ballot in Northern Mariana, but with candidates successively withdrawing nationally, the official field for the caucus had been reduced to Joe Biden and Bernie Sanders by March 5 (ignoring the continued candidacy of representative Tulsi Gabbard, which played no role in national polls), with no write-in votes being allowed and an uncommitted option as the sole alternative.

=== Results ===
2020 Northern Mariana Islands Democratic presidential caucus
Candidate	Votes	%	Delegates
Bernie Sanders	84	62.69	4
Joe Biden	48	35.82	2
Uncommitted	2	1.49	
Total	134	100%	6

== Republican caucus ==
The 2020 Northern Mariana Islands Republican presidential caucus took place as a commonwealth party convention on March 15, 2020, in the Republican Party primaries and caucuses for the 2020 presidential election. It was a closed caucus, with the territory awarding 9 delegates, all bound to the winner of the presidential preference vote. Afterwards 6 delegates were individually elected, while the other 3 automatic delegates participated at the 2020 Republican National Convention as leaders of the CNMI Republican Party. The caucus unanimously voted to bind the 9 national delegates to incumbent President Donald Trump.
