= Walking subcaucus =

The walking subcaucus system is a method of proportional voting used in political party meetings to choose delegates to higher meetings. It is designed to ensure that people in the minority are able to elect delegates representing their views to the higher body, as opposed to plurality at-large voting, in which the majority may elect all the delegates from members of the majority viewpoint.

== History ==
The walking subcaucus system was designed in the late 1960s in the Minnesota DFL party, in reaction to the Eugene McCarthy–Hubert Humphrey contest, when it was noted that the previous rules allowed a bare majority to fill all the delegate spots with their supporters, thus denying any representation to minority viewpoints. It was a way of meeting the requirements of the Democratic Party Rules Reform Commission while retaining a caucus rather than a primary system.

The walking subcaucus system was planned so that minority viewpoints were elected to delegate spots in proportion to their support at the meeting. One of the principal designers was Leo Hurwicz, a 1968 McCarthy delegate and later Nobel Prize winner in Economics.

== Use ==
This process is typically used at a party meeting (such as a caucus) where a large group of people has to elect a smaller number of delegates to represent them at the next higher party meeting or convention.

It basically means that the caucus meeting breaks into smaller sub-caucus meetings, and that rather than electing delegates at-large, each sub-caucus elects their own delegates from within their own group. The number of delegates elected from each subcaucus is determined by the size of that subcaucus.

It is also used in the Democratic caucuses of Iowa, calling the sub-caucuses preference groups. It was highlighted in news stories in February 2016 when a coin-toss was used to assign the final delegates for some precincts when the number of participants dropped during the process and an insufficient number of participants existed to assign all the delegates.

== Procedure ==
1. Individual people nominate by name a subcaucus. Typically, the name will include a candidate (or "uncommitted") and one or more issues, for example Franken-education-livable jobs or Uncommitted-Labor.
2. After all subcaucuses have been nominated, the meeting chair will designate a place in the building for each subcaucus to meet. Then the people present walk to the location of the subcaucus that they want to participate in (the walking part).
3. After a specified period of time, each subcaucus is checked for viability. To be viable, a subcaucus must have enough participants to elect a single delegate. Thus if there are 250 people participating, and 10 delegates spots for the next higher meeting, each subcaucus must have at least 25 people to be viable. People in subcaucuses that are not viable have to either move to another, or merge their subcaucus with a similar one.
4. An additional period of time is allowed for people from non-viable subcaucuses to move, and for mergers and trading between subcaucuses. (Viability calculations rarely come out exactly, so the subcaucus with the highest remainder will get the extra delegate(s). So one subcaucus might negotiate a deal with another to send some people over to their group, to get that extra delegate spot, in exchange for some consideration.)
5. After the end of this time period, the subcaucuses are 'frozen', the number of people in each subcaucus are counted, and each group is assigned the appropriate number of delegate spots. The numbers of delegates assigned are calculated according to a method that rounds the quotas, i.e. are typically not based on divisor methods like the D'Hondt method, but on a modification of a largest remainder method, like the original Hamilton method. The rules for determining number of delegates to be apportioned out of a total available need to be specified precisely, with a typical set of rules given below.
6. Delegates can only be awarded to viable preference groups. After the final alignment has concluded, a decimal number, quota, (# of members within a presidential preference group) x (# of delegates elected from that precinct caucus) divided by (Total number of eligible precinct caucus participants) is computed.
7. Preliminary rounding is first applied: If a decimal is 0.5 and above round up. If a decimal is below 0.5 round down.
8. After the preliminary rounding, one looks for Unallocated Delegates or Too Many Delegates. Unallocated Delegates: If any delegates are remaining after rounding, the extra delegate(s) are distributed starting with the candidate that is closest to rounding up to the next whole number. In the case of too Many Delegates: the extra delegates are subtracted the extra delegate(s) starting with the candidate that is furthest away from rounding up to the next whole number.
9. The exception is made for a viable group’s only delegate. A candidate can never lose their only delegate.
10. If there is an exact decimal tie, a game of chance is used to break the tie. The winner(s) will keep the additional delegate(s).
11. Procedure requires to make sure every viable candidate has at least one delegate.
12. Each group elects from within itself people to fill their number of delegate spots (and also an Alternate for each spot). When they have completed their elections, they report the people chosen back to the meeting chair.

== Criticisms ==
- The process is complicated and difficult for most people to understand.
- It can take a lot of time to complete. Often people get tired and go home during the subcaucusing.
- The walking around part of the process is often chaotic.
- The negotiating between subcaucuses can leave an uncomfortable feeling of 'back-room dealing'.
- It is very difficult to get the meeting back together to complete any other business.
