= 2020 New Jersey Democratic presidential primary =

- July 7, 2020

146 delegates (126 pledged, 20 unpledged) to the Democratic National Convention

| Candidate | Joe Biden | Bernie Sanders (withdrawn) |
| Home state | Delaware | Vermont |
| Delegate count | 121 | 5 |
| Popular vote | 814,188 | 140,412 |
| Percentage | 84.92% | 14.65% |
- Election results by county Joe Biden

The 2020 New Jersey Democratic presidential primary took place on July 7, 2020, alongside the Delaware primary, as part of the Democratic Party primaries for the 2020 presidential election. It was originally planned for June 2 together with four other primaries, but was moved due to the COVID-19 pandemic. The New Jersey primary was a semi-closed primary, with the state awarding 146 delegates, of which 126 were pledged delegates allocated on the basis of the results of the primary.

Former vice president and presumptive nominee Joe Biden won nearly 85% of the vote and almost all delegates. While senator Bernie Sanders closely failed to reach the 15% threshold for statewide delegates, he would have received 9 district delegates according to the final vote count, but for unknown reasons (possibly due to the counting of ballots only being finished in August, while delegates were selected by the state convention in July) the New Jersey Democrats only awarded him 5 delegates.

== Procedure ==
New Jersey planned to originally hold its primary elections on June 2, 2020, the same day as that of Montana, New Mexico, South Dakota and the District of Columbia, and was the only state on that date to move its primary, as New Jersey is traditionally one of the last states to vote. New Jersey Governor Phil Murphy announced on April 8, 2020, that, because of the COVID-19 pandemic, the primary would be postponed until July 7.

Voting was expected to take place throughout the state from 6:00 a.m. until 8:00 p.m. In the semi-closed primary, candidates had to meet a threshold of 15 percent at the delegate district or statewide level in order to be considered viable. The 126 pledged delegates to the 2020 Democratic National Convention were allocated proportionally on the basis of the results of the primary. Of these, between 3 and 6 were allocated to each of the state's 20 "delegate districts", each consisting of two legislative districts, and another 14 were allocated to party leaders and elected officials (PLEO delegates), in addition to 28 at-large delegates. Originally planned with 107 delegates, the final number included a 20% bonus of 19 additional delegates on the 70 district and 23 at-large delegates by the Democratic National Committee.

District-level delegates were chosen in the presidential primary with delegate candidates appearing on the ballot. Should presidential candidates have been entitled to more district delegates than delegate candidates presented, a special post-primary caucus at the state convention would have been called on July 18, to designate the additional delegates. The Democratic state committee subsequently convened at the state convention to vote on the 28 at-large and 14 pledged PLEO delegates to send to the Democratic National Convention. The delegation also included 20 unpledged PLEO delegates: 7 members of the Democratic National Committee, 12 members of Congress (both senators and 10 representatives), and the governor Phil Murphy.

On May 15, 2020, the governor signed an executive order declaring that the primary election would become a primarily vote-by-mail election. Democratic and Republican voters automatically received a vote-by-mail ballot while unaffiliated and inactive voters got a vote-by-mail application. Unaffiliated voters had to declare their party in the application and send it in to their respective county board of elections in order to vote and receive their primary election ballot. A limited number of polling stations in each county was available on primary day for those who preferred to vote in person (including with provisional ballots if they were unable to obtain one) and for voters with disabilities.

Pledged national convention delegates
| Type | Del. | Type | Del. | Type | Del. |
|---|---|---|---|---|---|
| D1 (LD1, LD3) | 3 | D8 (LD14, LD15) | 5 | D15 (LD28, LD29) | 6 |
| D2 (LD2, LD9) | 3 | D9 (LD16, LD17) | 4 | D16 (LD31, LD33) | 6 |
| D3 (LD4, LD5) | 4 | D10 (LD18, LD19) | 3 | D17 (LD32, LD36) | 5 |
| D4 (LD6, LD7) | 4 | D11 (LD23, LD24) | 3 | D18 (LD34, LD35) | 6 |
| D5 (LD8, LD12) | 3 | D12 (LD21, LD27) | 4 | D19 (LD37, LD38) | 6 |
| D6 (LD10, LD30) | 3 | D13 (LD20, LD22) | 4 | D20 (LD39, LD40) | 5 |
| D7 (LD11, LD13) | 4 | D14 (LD25, LD26) | 3 | PLEO / At-large | 14 / 28 |
| Total pledged delegates | | | | | 126 |

== Candidates ==
The following candidates were on the ballot in New Jersey:

- Joe Biden
- Bernie Sanders (withdrawn)

There was also an "uncommitted" option.

== Polling ==
Polling aggregation
| Source of poll aggregation | Date updated | Dates polled | Joe Biden | Bernie Sanders | Undecided (Note: Calculated by taking the difference of 100% and all other candidates combined) |
|---|---|---|---|---|---|
| FiveThirtyEight | Mar 8, 2020 | until Feb 18, 2020 (Note: FiveThirtyEight aggregates polls with a trendline regression of polls rather than a strict average of recent polls.) | 35.5% | 30.5% | 34.0% |

| Poll source | Date(s) administered | Sample size | Margin of error | Joe Biden | Michael Bloomberg | Cory Booker | Pete Buttigieg | Kamala Harris | Beto O'Rourke | Bernie Sanders | Elizabeth Warren | Other | Undecided |
|---|---|---|---|---|---|---|---|---|---|---|---|---|---|
| | Mar 5, 2020 | Warren withdraws from the race | | | | | | | | | | | |
| | Mar 4, 2020 | Bloomberg withdraws from the race | | | | | | | | | | | |
| | Mar 3, 2020 | Super Tuesday | | | | | | | | | | | |
| | Mar 2, 2020 | Klobuchar withdraws from the race | | | | | | | | | | | |
| | Mar 1, 2020 | Buttigieg withdraws from the race | | | | | | | | | | | |
| | Feb 29, 2020 | South Carolina primary; Steyer withdraws from the race after close of polls | | | | | | | | | | | |
| | Feb 22, 2020 | Nevada caucuses | | | | | | | | | | | |
| FDU | Feb 12–16, 2020 | 357 (RV) | – | 16% | 23% | – | 10% | – | – | 25% | 8% | 7% (Note: Klobuchar with 3%, Steyer with 2%, Gabbard with 0%, someone else at 1%) | 11% |
| | Feb 11, 2020 | New Hampshire primary; Yang withdraws from the race | | | | | | | | | | | |
| | Feb 3, 2020 | Iowa caucuses | | | | | | | | | | | |
| Emerson College | Jan 16–19, 2020 | 388 | ± 4.9% | 28% | 9% | – | 6% | – | – | 25% | 15% | 16% (Note: Yang with 6%, Klobuchar with 3%, Gabbard with 3%, Delaney with 2%, someone else at 2%) | – |
| | Jan 13, 2020 | Booker withdraws from the race | | | | | | | | | | | |
| | Dec 3, 2019 | Harris withdraws from the race | | | | | | | | | | | |
| | Nov 24, 2019 | Bloomberg announces his candidacy | | | | | | | | | | | |
| Monmouth University | Sep 12–16, 2019 | 713 | ± 3.7% | 26% | – | 9% | 6% | 6% | 0% | 18% | 20% | 7% (Note: Gabbard with 2%; de Blasio, Klobuchar and Yang with 1%; Bennet, Bullock, Castro, O’Rourke, Ryan, Steyer and Williamson with <1%) | 8% |
| Change Research | Aug 16–20, 2019 | 1176 | ± 2.9% | 26% | – | 5% | 12% | 8% | 2% | 21% | 23% | 3% (Note: Gabbard, Steyer, and Yang with 1%) | – |

== Results ==
2020 New Jersey Democratic presidential primary
| Candidate | Votes | % | Delegates |
|---|---|---|---|
| Joe Biden | 814,188 | 84.92 | 121 |
| Bernie Sanders (withdrawn) | 140,412 | 14.65 | 5 |
| Uncommitted | 4,162 | 0.43 | |
| Total | 958,762 | 100% | 126 |

=== Results by county ===
Biden won every county in New Jersey. As was the case in the 2016 primary, Sanders performed best in the northwestern part of the state.

| County | Biden | Biden % | Sanders | Sanders % |
|---|---|---|---|---|
| Atlantic | 24,562 | 86.4% | 3,867 | 13.6% |
| Bergen | 84,620 | 84.7% | 15,242 | 15.3% |
| Burlington | 54,631 | 88.0% | 7,424 | 12.0% |
| Camden | 62,808 | 87.3% | 9,111 | 12.7% |
| Cape May | 7,973 | 86.3% | 1,264 | 13.7% |
| Cumberland | 11,590 | 87.8% | 1,604 | 12.2% |
| Essex | 87,316 | 88.5% | 11,292 | 11.5% |
| Gloucester | 30,911 | 85.6% | 5,210 | 14.4% |
| Hudson | 57,392 | 82.2% | 12,448 | 17.8% |
| Hunterdon | 12,551 | 82.1% | 2,740 | 17.9% |
| Mercer | 39,446 | 86.5% | 6,131 | 13.5% |
| Middlesex | 70,927 | 83.3% | 14,218 | 16.7% |
| Monmouth | 49,116 | 84.1% | 9,284 | 15.9% |
| Morris | 41,609 | 82.4% | 8,904 | 17.6% |
| Ocean | 35,520 | 85.6% | 5,996 | 14.4% |
| Passaic | 29,148 | 82.9% | 6,030 | 17.1% |
| Salem | 5,086 | 84.6% | 928 | 15.4% |
| Somerset | 32,244 | 83.8% | 6,250 | 16.2% |
| Sussex | 8,891 | 77.6% | 2,564 | 22.4% |
| Union | 60,035 | 88.0% | 8,150 | 12.0% |
| Warren | 7,317 | 81.3% | 1,679 | 18.7% |
| Total | 813,693 | 85.3% | 140,336 | 14.7% |

== See also ==
- 2020 New Jersey Republican presidential primary
