= 2020 Pennsylvania Democratic presidential primary =

- June 2, 2020

210 delegates (186 pledged, 24 unpledged) to the Democratic National Convention The number of pledged delegates won is determined by the popular vote

Candidate	Joe Biden	Bernie Sanders (withdrawn)
Home state	Delaware	Vermont
Delegate count	151	35
Popular vote	1,264,624	287,834
Percentage	79.26%	18.04%
County results
Biden
70–80%
80–90%

The 2020 Pennsylvania Democratic presidential primary took place on June 2, 2020, after being postponed due to concerns about the COVID-19 pandemic, as one of eight delayed and regular primaries on the same day in the Democratic primaries for the 2020 presidential election. It was originally planned to take place on April 28, 2020, as one of several northeastern states in the "Acela primary". The Pennsylvania primary was a closed primary, with the state awarding 210 delegates, of whom 186 were pledged delegates allocated on the basis of the primary results.

Former vice president and presumptive nominee Joe Biden, who was born and raised in Pennsylvania, won the primary with more than 79% of the vote, earning another 151 delegates and helping him to cross the necessary majority of 1,991 delegates and officially win the Democratic nomination three days later during the vote count. Senator Bernie Sanders, who had suspended his campaign two months earlier but still competed for delegates, received around 18% of the vote and 35 delegates.

== Procedure ==
Pennsylvania had planned to join several northeastern states, which are connected by the Acela train system, as part of a regional cluster, the "Acela primary", in holding primaries on April 28. The other states that would have voted on that day were Connecticut, Delaware, Maryland, New York, and Rhode Island. Due to the COVID-19 pandemic, on March 27 Governor Tom Wolf signed a bill postponing the primary to June 2 as Pennsylvania, Rhode Island, and Indiana did the same, while the three other states selected different dates. They voted alongside these three postponed states and four regularly scheduled contests in the District of Columbia, Montana, New Mexico and South Dakota.

Voting took place throughout the state from 7:00 a.m. until 8:00 p.m. In the closed primary, candidates had to meet a threshold of 15% at the congressional district or statewide level in order to be considered viable. The 186 pledged delegates to the 2020 Democratic National Convention were allocated proportionally on the basis of the results of the primary. Of these, between 4 and 14 were allocated to each of the state's 18 congressional districts and another 20 were allocated to party leaders and elected officials (PLEO delegates), in addition to 41 at-large delegates. Originally planned with 153 delegates, the final number included a 25% bonus of 33 additional delegates on the 100 district and 33 at-large delegates by the Democratic National Committee, 10% for the original April date, which belonged to Stage II on the primary timetable, and an additional 15% for the regional "Acela" cluster.

Voters chose district-level national convention delegates during the presidential primary, with no need for an additional confirmation by party bodies. If a presidential candidate listed fewer district delegate candidates for the national convention than had to be allocated based on the results of the primary, then the additional delegates would be named at the subsequent state convention. On July 18 (postponed from July 13), the state convention voted on the 41 at-large and 20 pledged PLEO delegates for the national convention. The delegation also included 24 unpledged PLEO delegates: 12 members of the Democratic National Committee, 10 members of Congress (one senator and 9 representatives), Governor Wolf, and former DNC Chair Ed Rendell.

Pledged national convention delegates
Type	Del.	Type	Del.
CD1	8	CD10	7
CD2	8	CD11	5
CD3	14	CD12	4
CD4	10	CD13	4
CD5	9	CD14	5
CD6	8	CD15	4
CD7	7	CD16	5
CD8	6	CD17	8
CD9	4	CD18	9
PLEO	20	At-large	41
Total pledged delegates			186

== Candidates ==
The following candidates appeared on the ballot in Pennsylvania:

- Joe Biden
- Tulsi Gabbard (withdrawn)
- Bernie Sanders (withdrawn)

There was also an option for write-in votes, but their general amount was not tallied.

== Polling ==
Polling Aggregation
Source of poll aggregation	Date updated	Dates polled	Joe Biden	Bernie Sanders	Other/ Undecided (Note: Calculated by taking the difference of 100% and all other candidates combined)
270 to Win	Mar 18, 2020	Feb 11–Mar 8, 2020	39.5%	28.0%	32.5%
RealClear Politics	Feb 23, 2020	Jan 20–Feb 20, 2020	39.5%	28.0%	32.5%
FiveThirtyEight	Mar 8, 2020	until Feb 20, 2020 (Note: FiveThirtyEight aggregates polls with a trendline regression of polls rather than a strict average of recent polls.)	54.4%	29.3%	16.3%
Average			44.5%	28.4%	27.1%

Poll source	Date(s) administered	Sample size (Note: Key: A – all adults RV – registered voters LV – likely voters V – unclear)	Margin of error	Joe Biden	Michael Bloomberg	Cory Booker	Pete Buttigieg	Kamala Harris	Beto O'Rourke	Bernie Sanders	Elizabeth Warren	Other	Undecided
	Apr 8, 2020	Sanders suspends his campaign											
YouGov/Yahoo News	Mar 6–8, 2020	–(RV) (Note: Part of a 1,750 registered voter poll of Michigan, Pennsylvania, and Wisconsin)	± 5.1%	59%	–	–	–	–	–	31%	–	–	–
	Mar 1–5, 2020	Buttigieg, Klobuchar, Bloomberg and Warren withdraw from the race											
YouGov/University of Wisconsin-Madison	Feb 11–20, 2020	537 (LV)	–	20%	19%	–	12%	–	–	25%	9%	5% (Note: Klobuchar with 5%; "Others" not reported separately)	10% (Note: contains also "others")
	Feb 11, 2020	New Hampshire primary; Yang withdraws from the race after close of polls											
Franklin & Marshall College	Jan 20–26, 2020	292 (RV)	± 9.0%	22%	7%	–	6%	–	–	15%	14%	18% (Note: Yang and Klobuchar with 5%; "Other" with 2%; "None" with 6%)	19%
Baldwin Wallace University/Oakland; University/Ohio Northern University	Jan 8–20, 2020	502 (RV)	–	31.3%	9.1%	–	6.5%	–	–	20.5%	11.5%	8.8% (Note: Klobuchar and Yang with 2.5%; Bennet with 1.2%; Steyer with 1%; Gabbard with 0.9%; Delaney with 0.4%; Patrick with 0.3%)	11%
	Dec 3, 2019–Jan 13, 2020	Harris and Booker withdraw from the race											
	Nov 24, 2019	Bloomberg announces his candidacy											
	Nov 1, 2019	O'Rourke withdraws from the race											
Franklin & Marshall College	Oct 21–27, 2019	226 (RV)	± 8.9%	30%	–	1%	8%	1%	<1%	12%	18%	15% (Note: Bennet, Gabbard and Klobuchar with 2%; Yang with 1%; Bullock with <1%; none with 8%; other with 0%)	16%
Siena Research/New York Times	Oct 13–26, 2019	304	–	28%	–	0%	4%	1%	0%	14%	16%	3% (Note: Yang with 2%; Klobuchar with 1%; others with 0%)	30%
Kaiser Family Foundation	Sep 23–Oct 15, 2019	246 (LV)	–	27%	–	1%	3%	4%	No voters	14%	18%	5% (Note: Yang with 2%; Klobuchar and Steyer with 1%; Bennet, Bullock, Delaney, Gabbard, Messam, O'Rourke, Ryan, Sestak and Williamson with no voters; refused with 1%)	29%
Susquehanna Polling and Research Inc.	Sep 30–Oct 6, 2019	307 (RV)	± 5.6%	17%	–	0%	8%	1%	0%	6%	9%	7% (Note: Bennet with 2%; Klobuchar with 1%; Bullock, Castro, Delaney, Gabbard, Messam, Ryan, Sestak, Steyer, Williamson and Yang with 0%; someone else/none with 3%; refused to answer with 1%)	52%
Franklin & Marshall College	Jul 29–Aug 4, 2019	295	± 8.7%	28%	–	2%	6%	8%	1%	12%	21%	3% (Note: Bullock, Gabbard, and "Other" with 1%)	19%
Zogby Analytics	May 23–29, 2019	246	± 6.3%	46%	–	2%	9%	3%	2%	15%	8%	2% (Note: Castro, Gillibrand, and Yang with 1%; Delaney, Gabbard, Hickenlooper, Inslee, and Klobuchar with 0%)	–
Quinnipiac University	May 9–14, 2019	431	± 6.2%	39%	–	5%	6%	8%	2%	13%	8%	3% (Note: Klobuchar with 1%; Bennet, Castro, Delaney, Gabbard, Gillibrand, Hickenlooper, Inslee, Messam, Moulton, Ryan, Swalwell, Williamson, and Yang with <1%; others with 2%)	12%
	Apr 25, 2019	Biden announces his candidacy											
	Apr 14, 2019	Buttigieg announces his candidacy											
Muhlenberg College	Apr 3–10, 2019	405	± 5.5%	28%	–	3%	4%	8%	3%	16%	8%	9% (Note: Klobuchar with 3%; others with 6%)	20%
Emerson College	Mar 26–28, 2019	359	± 5.1%	39%	–	4%	6%	5%	5%	20%	11%	10% (Note: Gabbard with 3%; Gillibrand with 2%; Castro and Yang with 1%; Hickenlooper, Inslee, and Klobuchar with 0%; others with 4%)	–

== Results ==
2020 Pennsylvania Democratic presidential primary
Candidate	Votes	%	Delegates
Joe Biden	1,264,624	79.26	151
Bernie Sanders (withdrawn)	287,834	18.04	35
Tulsi Gabbard (withdrawn)	43,050	2.70	
Total	1,595,508	100%	186

== See also ==
- 2020 Pennsylvania elections
- 2020 Pennsylvania Republican presidential primary
- Elections in Pennsylvania

== Notes ==
Additional candidates
