= 2020 Rhode Island Democratic presidential primary =

- June 2, 2020

35 delegates (26 pledged, 9 unpledged) to the Democratic National Convention The number of pledged delegates won is determined by the popular vote

Candidate	Joe Biden	Bernie Sanders (withdrawn)
Home state	Delaware	Vermont
Delegate count	25	1
Popular vote	79,728	15,525
Percentage	76.67%	14.93%

Biden
50–60%
60–70%
70–80%

The 2020 Rhode Island Democratic presidential primary took place on June 2, 2020, after being postponed due to concerns about the coronavirus pandemic, as one of eight delayed and regular primaries on the same day in the Democratic Party primaries for the 2020 presidential election. It was originally planned to take place on April 28, 2020, as one of several northeastern states in the "Acela primary". The Rhode Island primary was a semi-closed primary, with the state awarding 35 delegates, of whom 26 were pledged delegates allocated on the basis of the primary results.

Former vice president and presumptive nominee Joe Biden won the primary with almost 77% of the vote and all delegates except one, which went to senator Bernie Sanders, as he had narrowly missed the threshold of 15% for statewide delegates. The remaining 8% went to three other candidates, notably senator Elizabeth Warren with 4%, write-in votes and an uncommitted option. Biden crossed the necessary majority of 1,991 delegates to officially win the Democratic nomination three days later during the vote count.

== Procedure ==
Rhode Island had planned to join several northeastern states, which are connected by the Acela train system, as part of a regional cluster, dubbed the "Acela primary", in holding primaries on April 28. The other states that would have voted on that day were Connecticut, Delaware, Maryland, New York, and Pennsylvania. On March 23, Governor Gina Raimondo, at the request of the board of elections, joined Maryland and Rhode Island, as well as Indiana, in delaying the primary to June 2 due to the COVID-19 pandemic, while the three other states selected different dates. They voted alongside these three postponed states and four regularly scheduled contests in the District of Columbia, Montana, New Mexico and South Dakota.

Voting took place throughout the state from 7 a.m. until 8 p.m. In the semi-closed primary, candidates had to meet a threshold of 15% at the congressional district or statewide level to be considered viable. The 26 pledged delegates to the 2020 Democratic National Convention were allocated proportionally on the basis of the results of the primary. Of these, 9 each were allocated to both of the state's 2 congressional districts and another 3 were allocated to party leaders and elected officials (PLEO delegates), in addition to 5 at-large delegates. Originally planned with 21 delegates, the final number included a 25% bonus of 5 additional delegates on the original number of 14 district and 4 at-large delegates by the Democratic National Committee, 10% for the original April date, which belonged to Stage II on the primary timetable, and an additional 15% for the regional "Acela" cluster.

District-level national convention delegates were voted on by the voters during the presidential primary, with no need for an additional confirmation by party bodies. If a presidential candidate listed fewer district delegate candidates than had to be allocated based on the results of the primary, then the additional delegates would be named by the state Democratic committee in a special post primary caucus, before voting on the 5 at-large and 3 pledged PLEO delegates at the national convention delegation meeting (both originally planned for May 17 and initially postponed to June 6). The delegation also included 9 unpledged PLEO delegates: 4 members of the Democratic National Committee, 4 members of Congress (both senators and two representatives), and the governor Gina Raimondo.

Pledged national convention delegates
Type	Del.
CD1	9
CD2	9
PLEO	3
At-large	5
Total pledged delegates	26

== Candidates ==
The following candidates appeared on the ballot in Rhode Island:

- Joe Biden
- Tulsi Gabbard (withdrawn)
- Bernie Sanders (withdrawn)
- Elizabeth Warren (withdrawn)
- Andrew Yang (withdrawn)

There was also an uncommitted option.

== Results ==
2020 Rhode Island Democratic presidential primary
Candidate	Votes	%	Delegates
Joe Biden	79,728	76.67	25
Bernie Sanders (withdrawn)	15,525	14.93	1
Elizabeth Warren (withdrawn)	4,479	4.31	
Andrew Yang (withdrawn)	802	0.77	
Tulsi Gabbard (withdrawn)	651	0.63	
Write-in votes	936	0.90	
Uncommitted	1,861	1.79	
Total	103,982	100%	26

=== Results by county ===
County	Biden	Gabbard	Sanders	Warren	Yang	Uncommitted	Write-In
Bristol	64.55%	2.29%	25.79%	4.96%	1.27%	0.64%	0.51%
Kent	59.31%	1.87%	29.74%	3.19%	2.09%	2.37%	1.43%
Newport	66.89%	1.01%	24.52%	4.30%	1.26%	1.10%	0.93%
Providence	60.33%	0.88%	31.05%	4.18%	1.04%	1.49%	1.04%
Washington	60.25%	1.41%	30.21%	4.80%	1.70%	0.88%	0.76%
TOTAL	76.67%	0.63%	14.93%	4.31%	0.77%	1.79%	0.90%
Source: https://uselectionatlas.org/RESULTS/state.php?fips=44&year=2020&f=0&off=0&elect=1

== See also ==
- 2020 Rhode Island Republican presidential primary
