= 2020 Maryland Democratic presidential primary =

- June 2, 2020

120 delegates (96 pledged, 24 unpledged) to the Democratic National Convention The number of pledged delegates won is determined by the popular vote

Candidate	Joe Biden	Bernie Sanders (withdrawn)
Home state	Delaware	Vermont
Delegate count	96	0
Popular vote	879,753	81,939
Percentage	83.72%	7.80%
County results
Biden
70 – 80%
80 – 90%
90 – 100%

Pledged national convention delegates
Type	Del.
CD1	7
CD2	8
CD3	8
CD4	9
CD5	9
CD6	7
CD7	9
CD8	8
PLEO	10
At-large	21
Total pledged delegates	96

The 2020 Maryland Democratic presidential primary took place on June 2, 2020, after being rescheduled due to the COVID-19 pandemic, as one of eight delayed and regular primaries on the same day in the Democratic Party primaries for the 2020 presidential election. It was originally planned to take place on April 28, 2020, as one of several states in the "Acela primary". (Note: It is nicknamed Acela primary because the states involved are connected by the Acela train system.) The Maryland primary was a closed primary, with the state awarding 120 delegates to the 2020 Democratic National Convention, of whom 96 were pledged delegates allocated on the basis of the primary results.

Former vice president and presumptive nominee Joe Biden won the primary with 83.7% of the vote, one of his best results in the whole primary cycle and his best until then, earning all delegates and helping him to cross the necessary majority of 1,991 delegates and officially win the Democratic nomination three days later during the vote count. Senator Bernie Sanders, who had withdrawn from the presidential race in April but still competed for delegates, only reached less than 8%, his lowest result until then. The remaining 9% were separated between 12 other long withdrawn candidates and the "uncommitted" option.

== Procedure ==
Maryland would have held its primary on April 28 as part of a regional cluster, the Acela primary, together with the five states of Connecticut, Delaware, New York, Pennsylvania and Rhode Island, but like Pennsylvania and Rhode Island Governor Larry Hogan postponed it to June 2, while the three other states selected different dates. On that day, they voted alongside one other delayed contest in Indiana and four regularly scheduled contests (District of Columbia, Montana, New Mexico and South Dakota).

Voting took place throughout the state from 7 a.m. until 8 p.m. In the closed primary, candidates had to meet a threshold of 15% at the congressional district or statewide level in order to be considered viable. The 96 pledged delegates to the 2020 Democratic National Convention were allocated proportionally on the basis of the primary results. Of these, between 7 and 9 were allocated to each of the state's 8 congressional districts and another 10 were allocated to party leaders and elected officials (PLEO delegates), in addition to 21 at-large delegates. Originally planned with 79 delegates, the final number included a 25% bonus of 17 additional delegates on the 52 district and 17 at-large delegates by the Democratic National Committee, 10% for the original April date, which belonged to Stage II on the primary timetable, and an additional 15% for the regional "Acela" cluster.

District-level national convention delegates were voted on by the voters during the presidential primary, with no need for an additional confirmation by partie bodies. If a presidential candidate listed fewer district delegate candidates than had to be allocated based on the results of the primary, then the additional delegates would be named by the Democratic state central committee, before voting on the 21 at-large and 10 pledged PLEO delegates for the Democratic National Convention. The committee would originally have met on May 23, 2020, with the replacement date for that meeting being unknown. The delegation also included 24 unpledged PLEO delegates: 14 members of the Democratic National Committee, 9 members of Congress (both senators and 7 representatives), and former DNC chair Joe Andrew.

== Candidates ==
The following individuals qualified for the ballot in Maryland:

Running

- Joe Biden

Withdrawn

- Michael Bennet
- Michael Bloomberg
- Cory Booker
- Pete Buttigieg
- Julian Castro
- Tulsi Gabbard
- Amy Klobuchar
- Deval Patrick
- Bernie Sanders
- Tom Steyer
- Elizabeth Warren
- Marianne Williamson
- Andrew Yang

John Delaney had also qualified but had submitted an official withdrawal on February 3 so that he could be taken off the ballot. There was also an uncommitted option.

== Polling ==
Poll source	Date(s) administered	Sample size (Note: Key: A – all adults RV – registered voters LV – likely voters V – unclear)	Margin of error	Joe Biden	Michael Bloomberg	Pete Buttigieg	Kamala Harris	Amy Klobuchar	Bernie Sanders	Elizabeth Warren	Other	Undecided
	Apr 8, 2020	Sanders suspends his campaign										
	Mar 1–5, 2020	Buttigieg, Klobuchar, Bloomberg, and Warren withdraw from the race										
Gonzales Research & Media Services	Feb 22–28, 2020	331 (LV)	± 5.5%	19%	15%	5%	–	4%	23%	8%	–	27%
Goucher College	Feb 13–19, 2020	371 (LV)	± 5.1%	18%	16%	7%	–	6%	24%	6%	4% (Note: Gabbard with <1%; Steyer with 0%; "Refused" with 4%)	18%
	Dec 3, 2019	Harris withdraws from the race										
Goucher College	Sept 13–19, 2019	300 (LV)	± 5.6%	33%	–	5%	6%	1%	10%	21%	9% (Note: Booker, Delaney, O'Rourke, and Yang with 1%; Castro, Gabbard, Other with <1%; Refused to answer with 5%)	15%

== Results ==
2020 Maryland Democratic presidential primary
Candidate	Votes	%	Delegates
Joe Biden	879,753	83.72	96
Bernie Sanders (withdrawn)	81,939	7.80	
Elizabeth Warren (withdrawn)	27,134	2.58	
Pete Buttigieg (withdrawn)	7,180	0.68	
Michael Bloomberg (withdrawn)	6,773	0.64	
Andrew Yang (withdrawn)	6,670	0.63	
Amy Klobuchar (withdrawn)	5,685	0.54	
Tulsi Gabbard (withdrawn)	4,226	0.40	
Cory Booker (withdrawn)	2,662	0.25	
Michael Bennet (withdrawn)	2,291	0.22	
Marianne Williamson (withdrawn)	897	0.09	
Julian Castro (withdrawn)	760	0.07	
Tom Steyer (withdrawn)	671	0.06	
Deval Patrick (withdrawn)	406	0.04	
Uncommitted	23,726	2.26	
Total	1,050,773	100%	96

== See also ==
- 2020 Maryland Republican presidential primary
