= 2020 Indiana Democratic presidential primary =

- June 2, 2020

89 delegates (82 pledged, 7 unpledged) to the Democratic National Convention The number of pledged delegates won is determined by the popular vote

Candidate	Joe Biden	Bernie Sanders (withdrawn)
Home state	Delaware	Vermont
Delegate count	80	2
Popular vote	380,836	67,688
Percentage	76.48%	13.59%
- County results Joe Biden

The 2020 Indiana Democratic presidential primary had been scheduled to take place on May 5, 2020, but was postponed to June 2 due to the COVID-19 pandemic, alongside seven delayed and regular primaries on that day in the Democratic Party primaries for the 2020 presidential election. The Indiana primary was an open primary, with the state awarding 89 delegates to the 2020 Democratic National Convention, of whom 82 were pledged delegates allocated on the basis of the primary results.

Former vice president and presumptive nominee Joe Biden won the primary with more than 76% of the vote and all but two delegates, which went to senator Bernie Sanders, who missed the 15% threshold for statewide delegates with 13.6%. Biden crossed the necessary majority of 1,991 delegates to officially win the Democratic nomination three days later during the vote count.

== Procedure ==
Indiana was the only state scheduled to vote on May 5 in the Democratic primaries. Due to the COVID-19 pandemic, Governor Eric Holcomb and Secretary of State Connie Lawson agreed with the chairs of the Democratic and the Republican party to reschedule the primary for June 2, the same day as the primaries in the District of Columbia, Maryland, Montana, New Mexico, Pennsylvania, Rhode Island and South Dakota.

Voting took place throughout the state from 6 a.m. until 6 p.m. local time. Candidates had to meet a threshold of 15% at the congressional district or statewide level to be considered viable. The 82 pledged delegates to the 2020 Democratic National Convention were allocated proportionally on the basis of the primary results. Of these, between 5 and 8 were allocated to each of the state's 9 congressional districts and another 9 were allocated to party leaders and elected officials (PLEO delegates), in addition to 18 at-large delegates. Originally planned with 70 delegates, the final number included a 20% bonus of 12 additional delegates on the 46 district and 15 at-large delegates by the Democratic National Committee due to the original May date, which belonged to Stage III on the primary timetable.

The state convention to designate the district-level national convention delegates had been planned for June 13 to June 17, but was replaced by an online vote in the same period. The district delegates then voted on the 18 at-large and 9 pledged PLEO delegates for the Democratic National Convention. The delegation also included 7 unpledged PLEO delegates: 5 members of the Democratic National Committee and 2 representatives from Congress.

Pledged national convention delegates
Type	Del.	Type	Del.
CD1	8	CD6	5
CD2	5	CD7	8
CD3	5	CD8	5
CD4	5	CD9	6
CD5	8	CD9	6
PLEO	9	At-large	18
Total pledged delegates			82

== Candidates ==
The following individuals appeared on the ballot:

Running

- Joe Biden

Withdrawn

- Michael Bloomberg
- Pete Buttigieg
- Tulsi Gabbard
- Amy Klobuchar
- Bernie Sanders
- Tom Steyer
- Elizabeth Warren
- Andrew Yang

== Polling ==
Poll source	Date(s) administered	Sample size	Margin of error	Joe Biden	Pete Buttigieg	Kamala Harris	Beto O'Rourke	Bernie Sanders	Elizabeth Warren	Other	Undecided
	Apr 8, 2020	Sanders suspends his campaign									
	Nov 1, 2019–March 5, 2020	O'Rourke, Harris, Buttigieg and Warren withdraw from the race									
We Ask America	Apr 29–May 5, 2019	280	± 5.9%	33%	20%	3%	2%	23%	2%	1% (Note: Booker with 1%; Klobuchar with <1%; others with <1%)	15%

== Results ==
2020 Indiana Democratic presidential primary
Candidate	Votes	%	Delegates
Joe Biden	380,836	76.48	80
Bernie Sanders (withdrawn)	67,688	13.59	2
Pete Buttigieg (withdrawn)	17,957	3.61	
Elizabeth Warren (withdrawn)	14,344	2.88	
Michael Bloomberg (withdrawn)	4,783	0.96	
Andrew Yang (withdrawn)	4,426	0.89	
Amy Klobuchar (withdrawn)	3,860	0.78	
Tulsi Gabbard (withdrawn)	2,657	0.53	
Tom Steyer (withdrawn)	1,376	0.28	
Total	497,927	100%	82

== Notes ==
Additional candidates

== See also ==
- 2020 Indiana Republican presidential primary
