= 2020 Kentucky Democratic presidential primary =

- June 23, 2020

60 delegates (54 pledged, 6 unpledged) to the Democratic National Convention The number of pledged delegates won is determined by the popular vote

| Candidate | Joe Biden | Uncommitted | Bernie Sanders (withdrawn) |
| Home state | Delaware | N/A | Vermont |
| Delegate count | 52 | 2 | 0 |
| Popular vote | 365,284 | 58,364 | 65,055 |
| Percentage | 67.91% | 10.85% | 12.09% |
County results
Biden
40 – 50%
50 – 60%
60 – 70%
70 – 80%

Pledged national convention delegates
| Type | Del. |
|---|---|
| CD1 | 4 |
| CD2 | 5 |
| CD3 | 10 |
| CD4 | 6 |
| CD5 | 3 |
| CD6 | 8 |
| PLEO | 6 |
| At-large | 12 |
| Total pledged delegates | 54 |

The 2020 Kentucky Democratic presidential primary took place on June 23, 2020, alongside the New York primary, as part of the Democratic Party primaries for the 2020 presidential election. It was originally planned for May 19, 2020, but was moved due to the COVID-19 pandemic. The Kentucky primary was a closed primary, with the state awarding 60 delegates to the 2020 Democratic National Convention, of whom 54 were pledged delegates allocated on the basis of the primary results.

Presumptive nominee and former vice president Joe Biden handily won the primary with almost 68% of the vote but not all of the 54 delegates. While senator Bernie Sanders, despite receiving 12% of the vote, failed to win any delegates, the option for uncommitted delegates caught up almost 11%, which were enough votes to allocate 2 uncommitted delegates from the district-level.

== Procedure ==
Kentucky was previously scheduled to vote on May 19, 2020, alongside Oregon, in the Democratic primaries, but on March 16, 2020, Governor Andy Beshear and Secretary of State Michael Adams announced that the primary would be postponed to June 23 amid concerns about the ongoing COVID-19 pandemic. The date was later also shared by New York, when moving its primary. The delay would normally have resulted in Kentucky losing half of its delegates, as the primary date was "past a June 9 deadline set by the Democratic National Committee", but there was no penalty in the pandemic as the 2020 Democratic National Convention was also delayed until August and the Democratic National Committee granted a waiver in May.

The polls were originally scheduled to be open from 6:00 a.m. until 6:00 p.m. local time. In the closed primary, candidates had to meet a threshold of 15 percent at the congressional district or statewide level in order to be considered viable. The 54 pledged delegates to the 2020 Democratic National Convention were allocated proportionally on the basis of the results of the primary. Of these, between 3 and 10 were allocated to each of the state's 6 congressional districts and another 6 were allocated to party leaders and elected officials (PLEO delegates), in addition to 12 at-large delegates. These delegate totals do not account for pledged delegate bonuses or penalties from timing or clustering. Originally planned with 24 delegates, the final number included a 20% bonus of 4 additional delegates on the original number of 16 district and 5 at-large delegates by the Democratic National Committee due to the original May date, which belonged to Stage III on the primary timetable.

Due to the pandemic, instead of county, district and state conventions selecting delegates, all district and statewide delegates for the Democratic National Convention were elected at the state executive meeting on June 27. The delegation also included 6 unpledged PLEO delegates: 4 members of the Democratic National Committee, one representative from Congress, and the governor Andy Beshear.

=== Polling places ===
Kentucky state elections officials cut the number of in-person polling places just under 3,700 to 170, including one each in Kentucky's two most populous counties, Jefferson and Fayette, the homes of Louisville and Lexington. These changes reflect a dramatic expansion of voting by mail and early voting, as well as a reduction of risks related to COVID-19. This led to accusations of voter suppression targeting especially African-Americans, mostly but not totally from Democrats.

== Candidates ==
The following candidates qualified for the ballot in Kentucky:

Running

- Joe Biden

Withdrawn

- Michael Bennet
- Pete Buttigieg
- Tulsi Gabbard
- Amy Klobuchar
- Deval Patrick
- Bernie Sanders
- Tom Steyer
- Elizabeth Warren
- Andrew Yang

== Results ==
2020 Kentucky Democratic presidential primary
| Candidate | Votes | % | Delegates |
|---|---|---|---|
| Joe Biden | 365,284 | 67.91 | 52 |
| Uncommitted | 58,364 | 10.85 | 2 |
| Bernie Sanders (withdrawn) | 65,055 | 12.09 | |
| Elizabeth Warren (withdrawn) | 15,300 | 2.84 | |
| Pete Buttigieg (withdrawn) | 9,127 | 1.70 | |
| Andrew Yang (withdrawn) | 7,267 | 1.35 | |
| Tulsi Gabbard (withdrawn) | 5,859 | 1.09 | |
| Amy Klobuchar (withdrawn) | 5,296 | 0.98 | |
| Tom Steyer (withdrawn) | 2,656 | 0.49 | |
| Michael Bennet (withdrawn) | 2,514 | 0.47 | |
| Deval Patrick (withdrawn) | 1,183 | 0.22 | |
| Total | 537,905 | 100% | 54 |

== See also ==
- 2020 Kentucky Republican presidential primary
- 2020 Kentucky Senate Democratic primary
