= 2020 New Mexico Democratic presidential primary =

- June 2, 2020

46 delegates (34 pledged, 12 unpledged) to the Democratic National Convention The number of pledged delegates won is determined by the popular vote

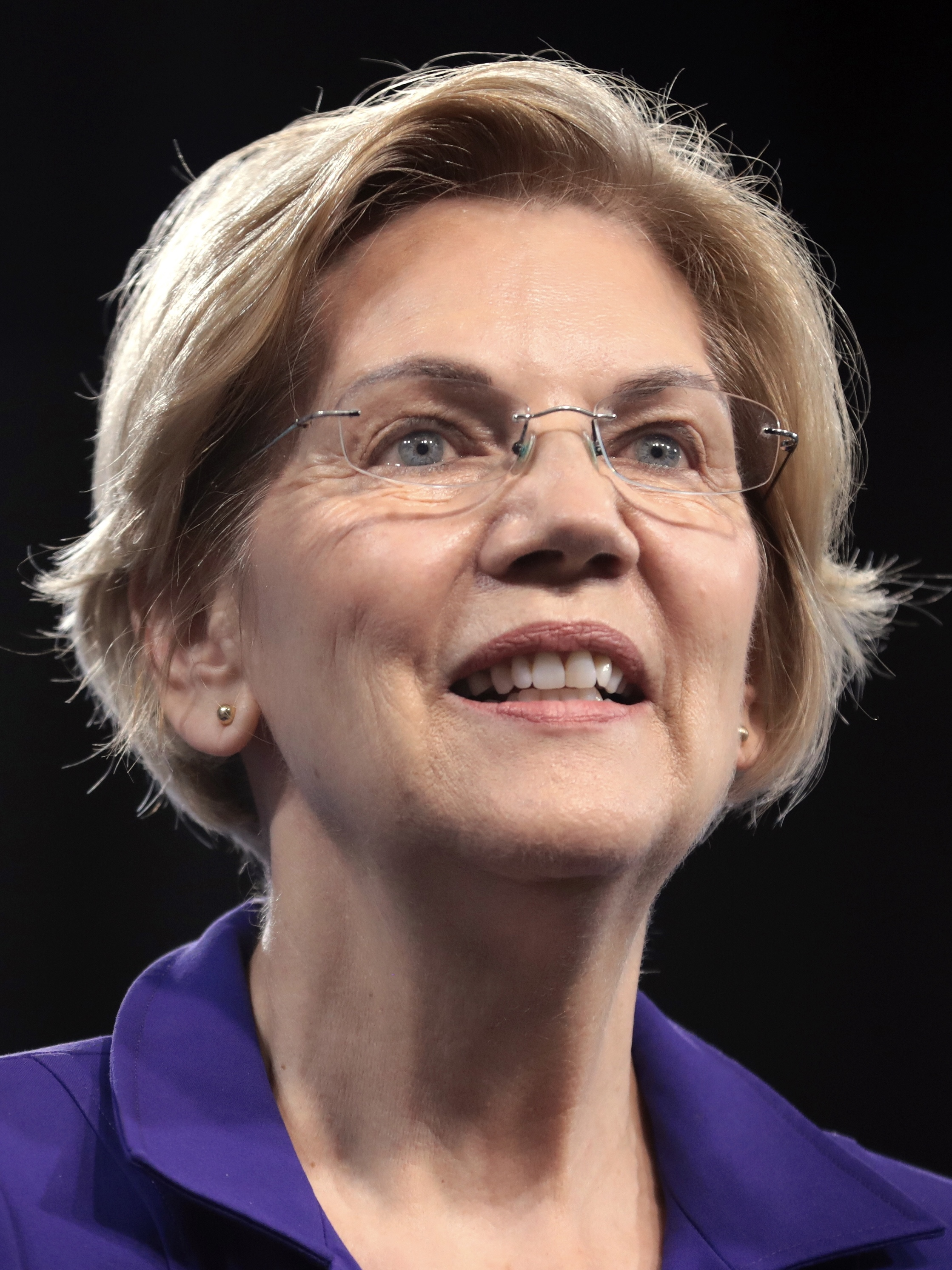
Candidate	Joe Biden	Bernie Sanders (withdrawn)	Elizabeth Warren (withdrawn)
Home state	Delaware	Vermont	Massachusetts
Delegate count	30	4	0
Popular vote	181,700	37,435	14,552
Percentage	73.30%	15.10%	5.87%
County results
Biden
60–70%
70–80%

The 2020 New Mexico Democratic presidential primary took place on June 2, 2020, as one of eight delayed and regular primaries on the same day in the Democratic Party primaries for the 2020 presidential election. The New Mexico primary was a closed primary, with the state awarding 46 delegates to the 2020 Democratic National Convention, of whom 34 were pledged delegates allocated on the basis of the primary results.

Former vice president and presumptive nominee Joe Biden won the primary with roughly 73% of the vote and won 30 delegates, helping him cross the necessary majority of 1,991 delegates and officially win the Democratic nomination three days later during the vote count, while senator Bernie Sanders, who had suspended his campaign two months earlier, narrowly passed the threshold of 15% and received 4 delegates and senator Elizabeth Warren, also withdrawn, received most of the remaining votes with around 6%.

== Procedure ==
New Mexico was one of seven states and the District of Columbia that voted on June 2, 2020, in the Democratic primaries, along with Indiana, Maryland, Montana, Pennsylvania, Rhode Island and South Dakota. Four of these states had moved their elections to June due to the COVID-19 pandemic in the United States.

Voting took place throughout the state from 7 a.m. until 7 p.m. In the closed primary, candidates had to meet a threshold of 15% at the congressional district or statewide level in order to be considered viable. The 34 pledged delegates to the 2020 Democratic National Convention were allocated proportionally on the basis of the primary results. Of these, between 5 and 9 were allocated to each of the state's 3 congressional districts and another 4 were allocated to party leaders and elected officials (PLEO delegates), in addition to 7 at-large delegates. Originally planned with 29 delegates, the final number included a 20% bonus of 5 additional delegates on the 19 district and 6 at-large delegates by the Democratic National Committee due to the June date, which belonged to Stage III on the primary timetable.

State delegates first voted on district-level delegates for the national convention at district conventions on June 13, and then voted on the 7 at-large and 4 pledged PLEO delegates at the state post-primary convention between June 19 and June 20. The delegation also included 12 unpledged PLEO delegates: 5 members of the Democratic National Committee, 5 members of Congress (both senators and all 3 representatives), the governor Michelle Lujan Grisham, and former DNC chair Fred R. Harris.

Pledged national convention delegates
Type	Del.
CD1	9
CD2	5
CD3	9
PLEO	4
At-large	7
Total pledged delegates	34

== Candidates ==
The following candidates appeared on the ballot:

Running

- Joe Biden

Withdrawn

- Tulsi Gabbard
- Deval Patrick
- Bernie Sanders
- Elizabeth Warren
- Andrew Yang

There was also an option for uncommitted delegates.

== Polling ==
Poll source	Date(s) administered	Sample size (Note: Key: A – all adults RV – registered voters LV – likely voters V – unclear)	Margin of error	Joe Biden	Michael Bloomberg	Cory Booker	Pete Buttigieg	Tulsi Gabbard	Amy Klobuchar	Bernie Sanders	Elizabeth Warren	Andrew Yang	Other	Undecided
	Apr 8, 2020	Sanders suspends his campaign												
	Mar 1–19, 2020	Buttigieg, Klobuchar, Bloomberg, Warren, and Gabbard withdraw from the race												
	Jan 13–Feb 11, 2020	Booker and Yang withdraw from the race												
Emerson Polling	Jan 3–6, 2020	447 (RV)	± 4.6%	27%	3%	2%	7%	2%	2%	28%	8%	10%	11% (Note: Steyer with 1%; Bennet, Delaney, Patrick, and Williamson with 0%; someone else with 10%)	-

== Results ==
2020 New Mexico Democratic presidential primary
Candidate	Votes	%	Delegates
Joe Biden	181,700	73.30	30
Bernie Sanders (withdrawn)	37,435	15.10	4
Elizabeth Warren (withdrawn)	14,552	5.87	
Andrew Yang (withdrawn)	4,026	1.62	
Tulsi Gabbard (withdrawn)	2,735	1.10	
Deval Patrick (withdrawn)	971	0.39	
Uncommitted Delegate	6,461	2.61	
Total	247,880	100%	34

== See also ==
- 2020 New Mexico Republican presidential primary
