= 2020 Delaware Republican presidential primary =

- July 7, 2020

16 pledged delegates to the Republican National Convention

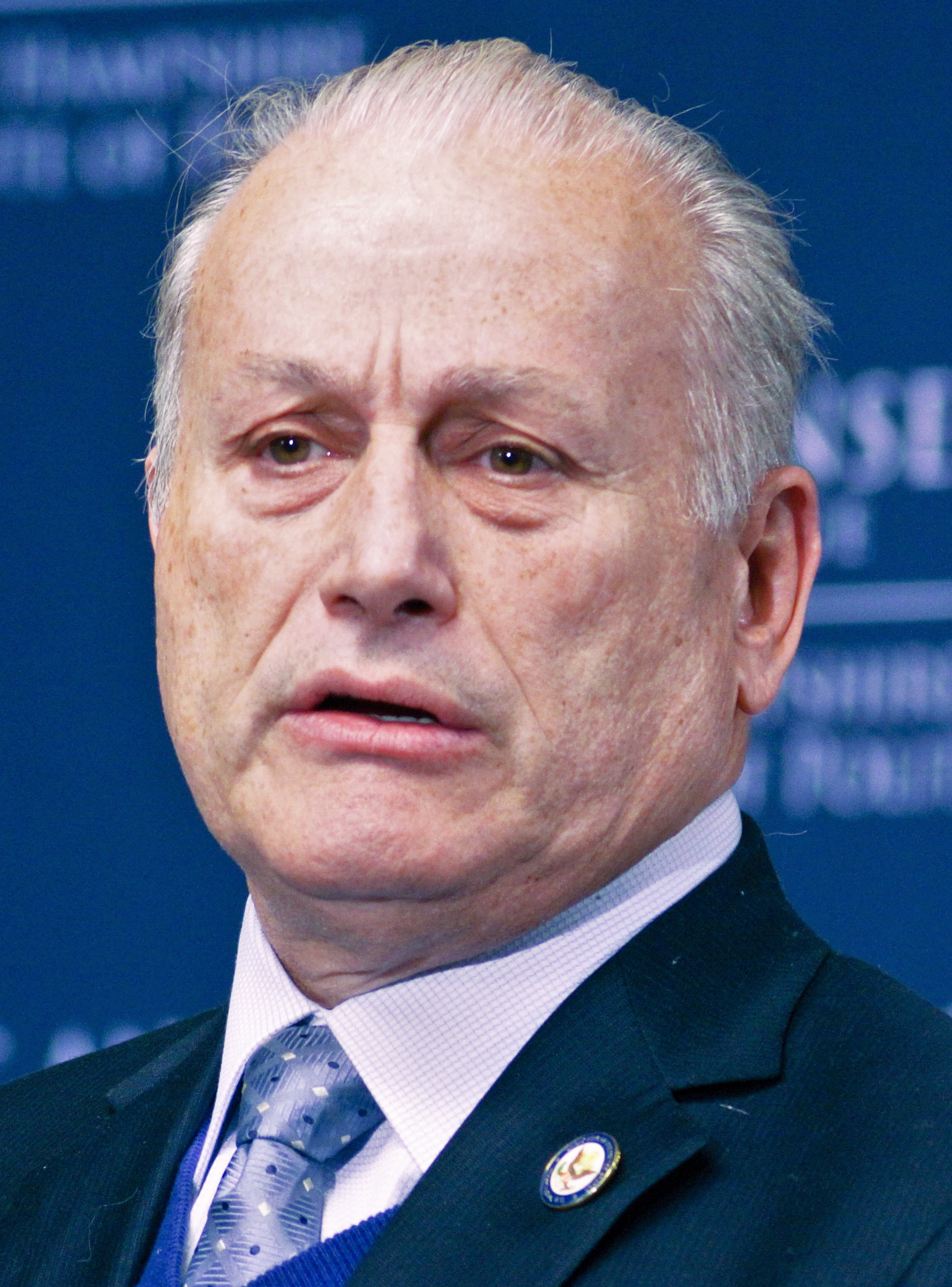
Candidate	Donald Trump	Rocky De La Fuente
Home state	Florida	California
Delegate count	16	0
Popular vote	28,876	3,920
Percentage	88.05%	11.95%

The 2020 Delaware Republican presidential primary took place on July 7, 2020, along with the New Jersey primary on the same day.

Donald Trump won the primary by a wide margin. Rocky De La Fuente, the only candidate other than Trump on the ballot, won his highest share of the vote in this primary.

== Results ==
2020 Delaware Republican presidential primary
Candidate	Popular vote		Pledged delegates
Candidate	#	%	Pledged delegates
Donald Trump	28,876	88.05	16
Rocky De La Fuente	3,920	11.95	0
Total	32,796	100%	16

=== Vote by county ===
2020 Delaware Republican presidential primary (results by county)
County	Donald Trump		Rocky De La Fuente		Total votes cast
County	Votes	%	Votes	%	Total votes cast
Kent	6,237	91.57	574	8.43	6,811
New Castle	10,112	82.01	2,218	17.99	12,330
Sussex	12,527	91.74	1,128	8.26	13,655
Total	28,876	88.05	3,920	11.95	32,796
