= 2020 South Dakota Democratic presidential primary =

- June 2, 2020

21 delegates (16 pledged, 5 unpledged) to the Democratic National Convention The number of pledged delegates won is determined by the popular vote

Candidate	Joe Biden	Bernie Sanders (withdrawn)
Home state	Delaware	Vermont
Delegate count	13	3
Popular vote	40,800	11,861
Percentage	77.48%	22.52%
- County results Joe Biden

The 2020 South Dakota Democratic presidential primary took place on June 2, 2020, as one of eight delayed and regular primaries on the same day in the Democratic Party primaries for the 2020 presidential election. The South Dakota primary was a semi-closed primary, with the state awarding 21 delegates to the 2020 Democratic National Convention, of whom 16 were pledged delegates allocated on the basis of the primary results.

Former vice president and presumptive nominee Joe Biden won the primary with 77.5% of the vote and 13 delegates and crossed the necessary majority of 1,991 delegates to officially win the Democratic nomination three days later during the vote count. Senator Bernie Sanders, who had suspended his campaign two months earlier, earned the remaining 22.5% and 3 delegates. South Dakota was one of only two states where Biden and Sanders had been the only remaining candidates on the ballot.

== Procedure ==
South Dakota was one of seven states and the District of Columbia voting on June 2, 2020 in the Democratic primaries, along with Indiana, Maryland, Montana, New Mexico, Pennsylvania and Rhode Island. Four of those states had moved their elections to June due to the COVID-19 pandemic in the United States.

Voting took place throughout the state from 7 a.m. until 7 p.m. In the semi-closed primary, candidates had to meet a threshold of 15% statewide (coterminous with the state's sole congressional district) to be considered viable. The 16 pledged delegates to the 2020 Democratic National Convention were allocated proportionally on the basis of the primary results. Of these, 10 were district-level delegates and another 2 were allocated to party leaders and elected officials (PLEO delegates), in addition to 4 at-large delegates. Originally planned with 13 delegates, the final number included a 20% bonus of 3 additional delegates on the original number of 8 district and 3 at-large delegates by the Democratic National Committee due to the June date, which belonged to Stage III on the primary timetable.

Regional and legislative district caucuses met on March 14 to elect delegates to the congressional district caucus. On March 21, the congressional district caucus convened in Pierre to designate national convention district-level delegates. The state convention then met virtually on June 20 and voted on the 4 at-large and pledged 2 PLEO delegates for the Democratic National Convention. The delegation also included 5 unpledged PLEO delegates: 4 members of the Democratic National Committee and former Senate Majority Leader Tom Daschle.

Pledged national convention delegates
Type	Del.
CD at-large	10
PLEO	2
At-large	4
Total pledged delegates	16

== Candidates ==
The only two candidates on the ballot in South Dakota were:

- Joe Biden
- Bernie Sanders (withdrawn)

Michael Bloomberg, Pete Buttigieg and Elizabeth Warren had also qualified for the primary but officially withdrew their candidacies at the Secretary of State.

== Results ==
2020 South Dakota Democratic presidential primary
Candidate	Votes	%	Delegates
Joe Biden	40,800	77.48	13
Bernie Sanders (withdrawn)	11,861	22.52	3
Total	52,661	100%	16

== See also ==
- 2020 South Dakota Republican presidential primary
