= 2020 Montana Democratic presidential primary =

- June 2, 2020

25 delegates (19 pledged, 6 unpledged) to the Democratic National Convention The number of pledged delegates won is determined by the popular vote

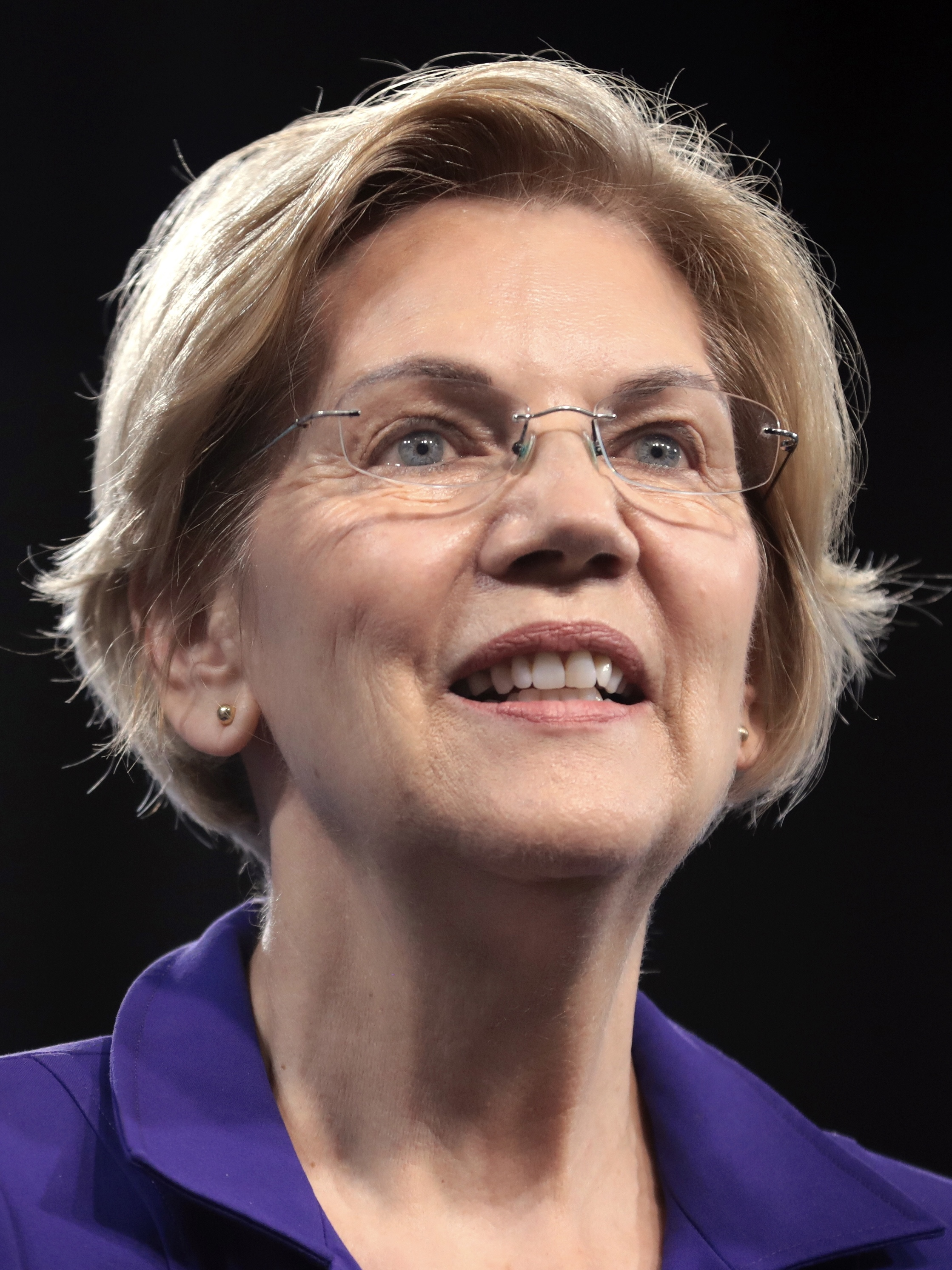
Candidate	Joe Biden	Bernie Sanders (withdrawn)	Elizabeth Warren (withdrawn)
Home state	Delaware	Vermont	Massachusetts
Delegate count	18	1	0
Popular vote	111,706	22,033	11,984
Percentage	74.48%	14.69%	7.99%
- Election results by county Joe Biden

Pledged national convention delegates
Type	Del.
Western district	7
Eastern district	6
PLEO	2
At-large	4
Total pledged delegates	19

The 2020 Montana Democratic presidential primary took place on June 2, 2020, as one of eight delayed and regular primaries on the same day in the Democratic Party primaries for the 2020 presidential election. The Montana primary was an open primary, with the state awarding 25 delegates to the 2020 Democratic National Convention, of whom 19 were pledged delegates allocated on the basis of the primary results.

Former vice president and presumptive nominee Joe Biden won the primary with more than 74% of the vote and won all delegates except one, crossing the necessary majority of 1,991 delegates to officially win the Democratic nomination three days later during the vote count, while senator Bernie Sanders narrowly missed the threshold for statewide delegates with 14.7%, winning one delegate, and senator Elizabeth Warren received the remaining 8%.

== Procedure ==
Montana was one of seven states and the District of Columbia to vote on June 2, 2020, in the Democratic primaries, along with Indiana, Maryland, New Mexico, Pennsylvania, Rhode Island and South Dakota. Four of those states had moved their elections to June due to the COVID-19 pandemic in the United States.

Voting took place throughout the state from 7 a.m. until 8 p.m. In the open primary, instead of using Montana's at-large congressional district, candidates had to meet a threshold of 15% in an eastern and a western district of the state (roughly coterminous with the boundaries of the state's two former congressional districts after the 1980 redistricting) to be considered viable. The 19 pledged delegates to the 2020 Democratic National Convention were allocated proportionally on the basis of the primary results. Of these, 6 and 7 were allocated to the eastern and western districts and another 2 were allocated to party leaders and elected officials (PLEO delegates), in addition to 4 at-large delegates. Originally planned with 16 delegates, the final number included a 20% bonus of 3 additional delegates on the 11 district and 3 at-large delegates by the Democratic National Committee due to the June date, which belonged to Stage III on the primary timetable.

On June 4, county caucuses met to designate state convention delegates, and at the state convention on June 6, all pledged national convention delegates were elected. The delegation also included 6 unpledged PLEO delegates: 4 members of the Democratic National Committee, one senator, and the governor Steve Bullock.

== Candidates ==
The following candidates appeared on the ballot:

- Joe Biden
- Bernie Sanders (withdrawn)
- Elizabeth Warren (withdrawn)

There was also a "no preference" option.

== Polling ==
Polls with a sample size of <100 are marked in red to indicate a lack of reliability.

Poll source	Date(s) administered	Sample size (Note: Key: A – all adults RV – registered voters LV – likely voters V – unclear)	Margin of error	Joe Biden	Steve Bullock	Pete Buttigieg	Kamala Harris	Beto O'Rourke	Bernie Sanders	Elizabeth Warren	Andrew Yang	Other	Undecided
	Apr 8, 2020	Sanders suspends his campaign											
	Nov 1, 2019–March 5, 2020	O'Rourke, Bullock, Harris, Yang, Buttigieg and Warren withdraw from the race											
Montana State University Billings	Oct 7–16, 2019	40 (LV)	–	15%	5%	2%	2%	5%	2%	40%	No voters	2% (Note: Klobuchar with 2%)	25%

== Results ==
2020 Montana Democratic presidential primary
Candidate	Votes	%	Delegates
Joe Biden	111,706	74.48	18
Bernie Sanders (withdrawn)	22,033	14.69	1
Elizabeth Warren (withdrawn)	11,984	7.99	
No Preference	4,250	2.83	
Total	149,973	100%	19

== See also ==
- 2020 Montana Republican presidential primary
