= 2020 District of Columbia Democratic presidential primary =

- June 2, 2020

45 delegates (20 pledged, 25 unpledged) to the Democratic National Convention The number of pledged delegates won is determined by the popular vote

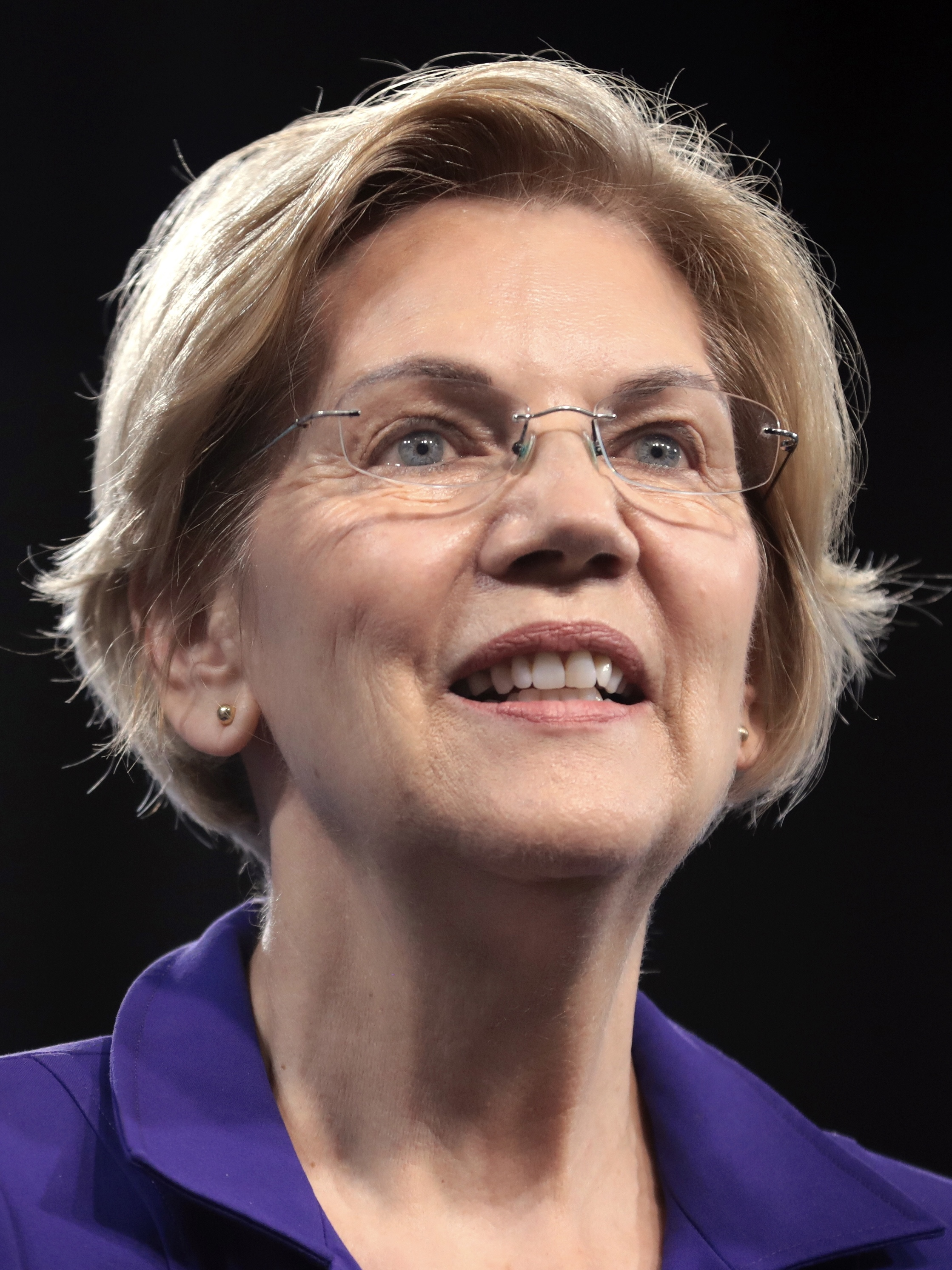

| Candidate | Joe Biden | Elizabeth Warren (withdrawn) | Bernie Sanders (withdrawn) |
| Home state | Delaware | Massachusetts | Vermont |
| Delegate count | 19 | 1 | 0 |
| Popular vote | 84,093 | 14,228 | 11,116 |
| Percentage | 75.97% | 12.85% | 10.04% |
- Joe Biden

Pledged national convention delegates
| Type | Del. |
|---|---|
| MD1 | 7 |
| MD2 | 6 |
| PLEO | 2 |
| At-large | 5 |
| Total pledged delegates | 20 |

The 2020 District of Columbia Democratic presidential primary took place on June 2, 2020, as one of eight delayed and regular contests on that day in the Democratic Party primaries for the 2020 presidential election. The District of Columbia primary was a closed primary, with the district awarding 45 delegates to the 2020 Democratic National Convention, of whom 20 were pledged delegates allocated on the basis of the results of the primary.

Former vice president and presumptive nominee Joe Biden won the primary with 76% of the vote, earning 19 delegates, and crossed the necessary majority of 1,991 delegates to officially win the Democratic nomination three days later during the vote count. Senator Elizabeth Warren saw her only second-place finish in the 2020 primaries with almost 13% and won 1 delegate, while senator Bernie Sanders came in third with 10%, although Warren had long before withdrawn from the race in March and in difference to Sanders had not sought to win any more delegates. As almost all news articles only published the preliminary results and did not update on the final certified results (which were higher for Warren), they did not show a delegate for Warren.

== Procedure ==
The District of Columbia was one of eight entities (originally 5 entities, before postponment of several primaries due to the COVID-19 pandemic) holding primaries on June 2, 2020, alongside Indiana, Maryland, Montana, New Mexico, Pennsylvania, Rhode Island and South Dakota. A law passed in December 2019 had moved the election from June 16 to June 2. Voting took place across the district from 7:00 a.m. until 8:00 p.m. local time. In the closed primary, candidates had to meet a threshold of 15% at municipal districts or the whole federal district in order to be considered viable. The 20 pledged delegates to the 2020 Democratic National Convention were allocated proportionally on the basis of the primary results. Of these, 6 and 7 were allocated to the two municipal districts (each consisting of 4 of Washington, D.C.'s wards) and another 2 were allocated to party leaders and elected officials (PLEO delegates), in addition to 5 at-large delegates. Originally planned with 17 delegates, the final number included a 20% bonus of 3 additional delegates on the 11 district and 4 at-large delegates by the Democratic National Committee due to the June date, which belonged to Stage III on the primary timetable.

A pre-primary caucus, in order to designate the different presidential candidates' municipal district-level delegate slates, would have been held at the Walter E. Washington Convention Center on May 9, 2020, but because of the COVID-19 pandemic it was replaced with an online election between April 25 and May 21. The state party committee then met after the primary to vote on the 2 pledged PLEO delegates on June 4, to finally vote on the 13 municipal district delegates on June 9, and to vote on the 5 at-large delegates on June 11. The delegation also included 25 unpledged PLEO delegates: 21 members of the Democratic National Committee, 3 "members of Congress" (consisting of the congressional nonvoting delegate Eleanor Holmes Norton and two non-congressional shadow senators), and the mayor Muriel Bowser.

== Candidates ==
The following individuals appeared on the ballot in the District of Columbia:

- Joe Biden
- Tulsi Gabbard (withdrawn)
- Bernie Sanders (withdrawn)
- Elizabeth Warren (withdrawn)

== Results ==
Popular vote share by ward
Biden—60–70%
Biden—70–80%
Biden—80–90%

Popular vote share by precinct
Biden—50–60%
Biden—60–70%
Biden—70–80%
Biden—80–90%
Biden—>90%

2020 District of Columbia Democratic presidential primary
| Candidate | Votes | % | Delegates |
|---|---|---|---|
| Joe Biden | 84,093 | 75.97 | 19 |
| Elizabeth Warren (withdrawn) | 14,228 | 12.85 | 1 |
| Bernie Sanders (withdrawn) | 11,116 | 10.04 | |
| Tulsi Gabbard (withdrawn) | 442 | 0.40 | |
| Write-in votes | 809 | 0.73 | |
| Total | 110,688 | 100% | 20 |

== See also ==
- 2020 District of Columbia Republican presidential primary
