= 2020 Delaware Democratic presidential primary =

- July 7, 2020

32 delegates (21 pledged, 11 unpledged) to the Democratic National Convention The number of pledged delegates won is determined by the popular vote

Candidate	Joe Biden	Bernie Sanders (withdrawn)
Home state	Delaware	Vermont
Delegate count	21	0
Popular vote	81,954	6,878
Percentage	89.39%	7.50%

Biden
80–90%
>90%

The 2020 Delaware Democratic presidential primary took place on July 7, 2020, alongside the New Jersey primary, as part of the Democratic Party primaries for the 2020 presidential election. It was originally going to take place on April 28, 2020, as one of several northeastern states in the "Acela primary", but was postponed due to the COVID-19 pandemic. The Delaware primary was a closed primary, with the state awarding 32 delegates to the 2020 Democratic National Convention, of which 21 were pledged delegates allocated on the basis of the primary results.

Former vice president and presumptive nominee Joe Biden, who represented the state in the senate for three and a half decades, swept all delegates in this primary, winning almost 90% of the vote. Senator Bernie Sanders, who still attempted to win delegates, took little more than 7% of the vote, with senator Elizabeth Warren, the only other withdrawn candidate, collecting the rest.

== Procedure ==
Delaware originally joined several northeastern states, which are connected by the Acela train system, as part of a regional cluster, the "Acela primary", in holding primaries on April 28, 2020. Governor John Carney postponed the primary first in March to June 2 and then in May to July 7. The Democratic National Committee granted a waiver for the late date outside of the window sanctioned by the party. New Jersey had moved its primary, which was originally planned on June 2, to the same date.

Voting took place throughout the state from 7:00 a.m. until 8:00 p.m. In the closed primary, candidates had to meet a threshold of 15 percent at the city and county or the statewide level in order to be considered viable. While Delaware consists of only one congressional district, the state party decided to subdivide its regional delegates between the 3 counties of the state and one city, being one of only two states in the Democratic Party to do so. The 21 pledged delegates to the 2020 Democratic National Convention were allocated proportionally on the basis of the results of the primary. Of these, between 2 and 8 were allocated to each of the state's 3 counties and the city of Wilmington and another 2 were allocated to party leaders and elected officials (PLEO delegates), in addition to 5 at-large delegates. Originally planned with 17 delegates, the final number included a 25% bonus of 4 additional delegates on the 11 county/city and 4 at-large delegates by the Democratic National Committee, 10% for the original April date, which belonged to Stage II on the primary timetable, and an additional 15% for the regional "Acela" cluster.

Pledged national convention delegates
Type	Del.
City of Wilmington	2
New Castle County (Note: excluding Wilmington)	8
Kent County	2
Sussex County	2
PLEO	2
At-large	5
Total pledged delegates	21

The delegate selection caucus, planned to be held on May 9, 2020, took place in Delaware on July 16, 2020, following representative district-level caucuses shortly before, where delegate selection caucus delegates had been chosen. The caucus voted on the county and city delegates, who then voted on the 5 at-large and 2 pledged PLEO delegates for the Democratic National Convention. The delegation also included 11 unpledged PLEO delegates: 6 members of the Democratic National Committee, all 3 members of Congress (both senators and one representative), the governor John Carney, and notably, former vice president Joe Biden.

In addition to delaying in-person voting from April 28, 2020, to June 2, 2020, to July 7, 2020, the requirements for using a mail-in absentee ballot had broadened to include voters who wished to follow public health guidelines for self-quarantine or social distancing even if they were experiencing no symptoms.

== Candidates ==
The following candidates qualified for the ballot in Delaware:

- Joe Biden
- Bernie Sanders (withdrawn)
- Elizabeth Warren (withdrawn)

== Polling ==
Poll source	Date(s) administered	Sample size	Margin of error	Joe Biden	Cory Booker	Pete Buttigieg	Tulsi Gabbard	Kamala Harris	Bernie Sanders	Elizabeth Warren	Andrew Yang	Other	Undecided
	Apr 8, 2020	Sanders suspends his campaign											
	Mar 19, 2020	Gabbard withdraws from the race											
	Mar 1–5, 2020	Buttigieg, Klobuchar, Bloomberg, and Warren withdraw from the race											
	Jan 13, 2020	Booker withdraws from the race											
	Dec 3, 2019	Harris withdraws from the race											
Data For Progress	Nov 15–25, 2019	481 (LV)	– (Note: Not reported by source)	35%	3%	8%	3%	1%	13%	11%	1%	10% (Note: Bloomberg, Delaney, Klobuchar and Williamson with 1%)	15%

== Results ==
2020 Delaware Democratic presidential primary
Candidate	Votes	%	Delegates
Joe Biden	81,954	89.39	21
Bernie Sanders (withdrawn)	6,878	7.50	
Elizabeth Warren (withdrawn)	2,850	3.11	
Total	91,682	100%	21

=== Results by county ===
Favorite son Joe Biden overwhelmingly won all three counties; 73% of Sanders's votes came from New Castle County. Sanders failed to break the 15% threshold in any constituency, leading to a Biden sweep of delegates. Just over three percent of votes went to Elizabeth Warren, who had withdrawn from the race in March.

County	Biden	%	Sanders	%	Warren	%
Kent	12,042	86.0%	964	7.2%	404	6.8%
New Castle	53,231	88.6%	4,983	8.3%	1,895	3.1%
Sussex	16,684	92.6%	931	5.2%	551	2.2%
Total	81,954	89.4%	6,878	7.5%	2,850	3.1%

== See also ==
- 2020 Delaware Republican presidential primary
