= 2020 New York Democratic presidential primary =

- June 23, 2020

324 delegates (274 pledged, 50 unpledged) to the Democratic National Convention The number of pledged delegates won is determined by the popular vote

Candidate	Joe Biden	Bernie Sanders (withdrawn)	Blank and void ballots
Home state	Delaware	Vermont	N/A
Delegate count	230	44	—
Popular vote	1,136,679	285,908	140,107
Percentage	64.62%	16.25%	7.96%
County results
Biden
50–60%
60–70%
70–80%
80–90%

New York City results by precinct Biden: 20–30%; 30–40%; 40–50%; 50–60%; 60–70%; 70–80%; 80–90%; 90–100%; Sanders: 20–30%; 30–40%; 40–50%; 50–60%; 60–70%; 70–80%; Blank/Void: 20–30%; 30–40%; 40–50%; 50–60%; 60–70%; 70–80%; 80–90%; 90–100%; Bloomberg: 20–30%; 30–40%; 40–50%; 90–100%; Buttigieg: 90–100%; Gabbard: 90–100%; Other: 20–30% tie; 30–40% tie; 40–50% tie; 50% tie; No votes

The 2020 New York Democratic presidential primary took place on June 23, 2020, alongside the Kentucky primary, as part of the Democratic Party primaries for the 2020 presidential election. It was originally planned to take place on April 28, 2020, as one of several northeastern states in the "Acela primary", but was postponed due to the COVID-19 pandemic. The New York primary was a closed primary, with the state awarding 324 delegates to the 2020 Democratic National Convention, of whom 274 were pledged delegates allocated on the basis of the primary results.

The State Board of Elections had cancelled the primary in April but representatives of withdrawn candidates Andrew Yang and Bernie Sanders sued against the decision, and federal courts reinstated the primary with all its original candidates in May. Former vice president and presumptive nominee Joe Biden decided the primary with almost 65% of the vote, winning 231 delegates, according to a party source, while senator Sanders caught a relevant amount of delegates the last time in the primary cycle, receiving 16% and 43 delegates, and among 8 other candidates senator Elizabeth Warren got around 5%. The primary results also included almost 8% of blank and void ballots.

Following the final certified results, Sanders would actually have won 2 delegates more, but as the results were only completed in September, roughly a month after the national convention, he apparently received a lower amount of 43 or 44 delegates at the time of the convention, with media either reporting the initial preliminary 231–43 number or in most cases just ceasing to follow up on the numbers long before even any relevant percentage had been reached in the ballot count. On the convention floor Sanders received 44 delegate votes.

== Procedure ==
New York originally joined several northeastern states, which are connected by the Acela train system, as part of a regional cluster, the "Acela primary", in holding primaries on April 28, 2020. State statute originally had mandated that the primary would be held on February 4 for procedural reasons, which would have violated the window sanctioned by the national party. In September 2019, New York Governor Andrew Cuomo signed a bill into law that designated April 28 as the state's presidential primary date. Primaries for other offices (federal, state, and local) were already scheduled to take place on June 23, 2020. Cuomo announced on March 28, 2020, that the presidential primary would be postponed to June 23 because of the ongoing COVID-19 pandemic.

Voting was expected to take place throughout the state from 6:00 a.m. until 9:00 p.m. In the closed primary, candidates had to meet a threshold of 15 percent at the congressional district or statewide level in order to be considered viable. The 274 pledged delegates to the 2020 Democratic National Convention were allocated proportionally on the basis of the results of the primary. Of these, between 6 and 8 were allocated to each of the state's 27 congressional districts and another 29 were allocated to party leaders and elected officials (PLEO delegates), in addition to 61 at-large delegates. Originally planned with 225 delegates, the final number included a 25% bonus of 49 additional delegates on the 147 district and 49 at-large delegates by the Democratic National Committee, 10% for the original April date, which belonged to Stage II on the primary timetable, and an additional 15% for the regional "Acela" cluster.

District-level delegates were selected by voters on the presidential primary ballot. Should candidates have been entitled to more delegates based on the results of the primary than eligible delegates presented, then additional delegates would have been designated by the state committee at a special post-primary caucus before the state convention. The state Democratic committee would have met on May 12, 2020, to vote on the 61 at-large and 29 pledged PLEO delegates for the Democratic National Convention; the meeting was held online on 4 August instead. The delegation also included 50 unpledged PLEO delegates: 25 members of the Democratic National Committee, 23 members of Congress (both senators, notably former candidate Kirsten Gillibrand, and 21 representatives), the governor Andrew Cuomo, and former president Bill Clinton.

Pledged national convention delegates
Type	Del.	Type	Del.	Type	Del.
CD1	6	CD10	7	CD19	6
CD2	6	CD11	6	CD20	7
CD3	7	CD12	8	CD21	6
CD4	7	CD13	8	CD22	6
CD5	8	CD14	6	CD23	6
CD6	6	CD15	7	CD24	7
CD7	7	CD16	8	CD25	7
CD8	8	CD17	7	CD26	7
CD9	8	CD18	6	CD27	6
PLEO		29	At-large		61
Total pledged delegates					274

== Cancellation and rescheduling ==
On April 27, 2020, the Democratic Commissioners at the New York State Board of Elections removed all candidates that had ended or suspended their campaigns for president from the ballot pursuant to NYS Election Law 2-122(a), arguing that only one candidate remained in the race so no primary needed to be held. The commissioners cited the COVID-19 pandemic in New York and millions of dollars in expenses.

On April 28, Andrew Yang sued the New York State Board of Elections over this decision, saying that it "creates a dangerous precedent". On May 5, a federal judge ruled that the primary election must proceed with the candidates and delegates who were on the ballot as of April 26 while the primary will be held on June 23, 2020. The State appealed the decision to the 2nd Circuit Court of Appeals, but lost the appeal on May 19 and did not appeal further.

== Candidates ==
The following candidates qualified for the ballot in New York:

Running

- Joe Biden

Withdrawn

- Michael Bennet
- Michael Bloomberg
- Pete Buttigieg
- Tulsi Gabbard
- Amy Klobuchar
- Deval Patrick
- Bernie Sanders
- Tom Steyer
- Elizabeth Warren
- Andrew Yang

== Polling ==
Polling aggregation
Source of poll aggregation	Date updated	Dates polled	Joe Biden	Bernie Sanders	Other/ Undecided (Note: Calculated by taking the difference of 100% and all other candidates combined)
FiveThirtyEight	Mar 18, 2020	until Mar 18, 2020 (Note: FiveThirtyEight aggregates polls with a trendline regression of polls rather than a strict average of recent polls.)	51.7%	28.9%	21.4%

Poll source	Date(s) administered	Sample size (Note: Key: A – all adults RV – registered voters LV – likely voters V – unclear)	Margin of error	Joe Biden	Michael Bloomberg	Pete Buttigieg	Kamala Harris	Amy Klobuchar	Bernie Sanders	Elizabeth Warren	Other	Un- decided
	Apr 8, 2020	Sanders suspends his campaign										
	Mar 19, 2020	Gabbard withdraws from the race										
	Mar 1–5, 2020	Buttigieg, Klobuchar, Bloomberg, and Warren withdraw from the race										
Siena College Research Institute	Feb 16–20, 2020	315 (RV)	–	13%	21%	9%	–	9%	25%	11%	1% (Note: Gabbard with 1%; Steyer with 0%)	11%
	Feb 3, 2020	Iowa caucus is held										
Civis Analytics/Data For Progress	Jan 13–19, 2020	845 (LV)	–	30%	17%	7%	–	2%	17%	14%	15% (Note: Steyer and Yang with 4%; Bennet with 2%; Delaney, Gabbard, and Patrick with 1%)	–
	Dec 3, 2019	Harris withdraws from the race										
Siena College	Nov 12–18, 2019	797 (RV)	± 4.0%	24%	–	5%	3%	1%	13%	14%	12% (Note: Booker and Yang with 2%; Bennet, Castro, and Gabbard with 1%; Bullock, Delaney, Messam, Patrick, Sestak, Steyer and Williamson with 0%; others with 4%)	29% (Note: also includes "refused")
Siena College	Oct 6–10, 2019	340 (RV)	± 6.5%	21%	–	4%	4%	1%	16%	21%	10% (Note: Yang with 3%; Booker, and O'Rourke with 1%; de Blasio and Gabbard with <1%; other with 4%)	24% (Note: also includes "refused")
	Sep 20, 2019	de Blasio withdraws from the race										
Siena College*	Sep 8–12, 2019	359 (RV)	± 6.1%	22%	–	3%	4%	1%	15%	17%	4% (Note: Gabbard and Yang with 1%; Booker, de Blasio, Castro and O'Rourke with less than 1%; "Other" with 1%)	34%
	Aug 28, 2019	Gillibrand withdraws from the race										

=== Head-to-head polls ===
Poll source	Date(s) administered	Sample size	Margin of error	Bill de Blasio	Kirsten Gillibrand	Other	Undecided
Siena College	Jun 2–6, 2019	385	–	25%	56%	11%	8%

== Results ==
2020 New York Democratic presidential primary
Candidate	Votes	%	Delegates
Joe Biden	1,136,679	64.62	230
Bernie Sanders (withdrawn)	285,908	16.25	44
Elizabeth Warren (withdrawn)	82,917	4.71	
Michael Bloomberg (withdrawn)	39,433	2.24	
Pete Buttigieg (withdrawn)	22,927	1.30	
Andrew Yang (withdrawn)	22,686	1.29	
Amy Klobuchar (withdrawn)	11,028	0.63	
Tulsi Gabbard (withdrawn)	9,083	0.52	
Deval Patrick (withdrawn)	3,040	0.17	
Michael Bennet (withdrawn)	2,932	0.17	
Tom Steyer (withdrawn)	2,299	0.13	
Blank ballots / Void ballots	(Note: 135,486 blank and 4,621 void ballots)140,107	7.96	
Total	1,759,039	100%	274

== See also ==
- 2020 New York state elections
