= Timeline of the 2020 United States presidential election (January–October 2020) =

- November 3, 2020

The following is a timeline of major events leading up and during the 2020 United States presidential election, the 59th quadrennial United States presidential election, from January to October 2020. For previous events, see Timeline of the 2020 United States presidential election (2017–2019). For subsequent events, see Timeline of the 2020 United States presidential election (November 2020–January 2021)

The presidential primaries and caucuses were held between February and August 2020, staggered among the 50 states, Washington, D.C., and U.S. territories. The conventions in August nominated president Donald Trump for the Republican Party and Joe Biden for the Democratic Party.

Democratic Party ticket

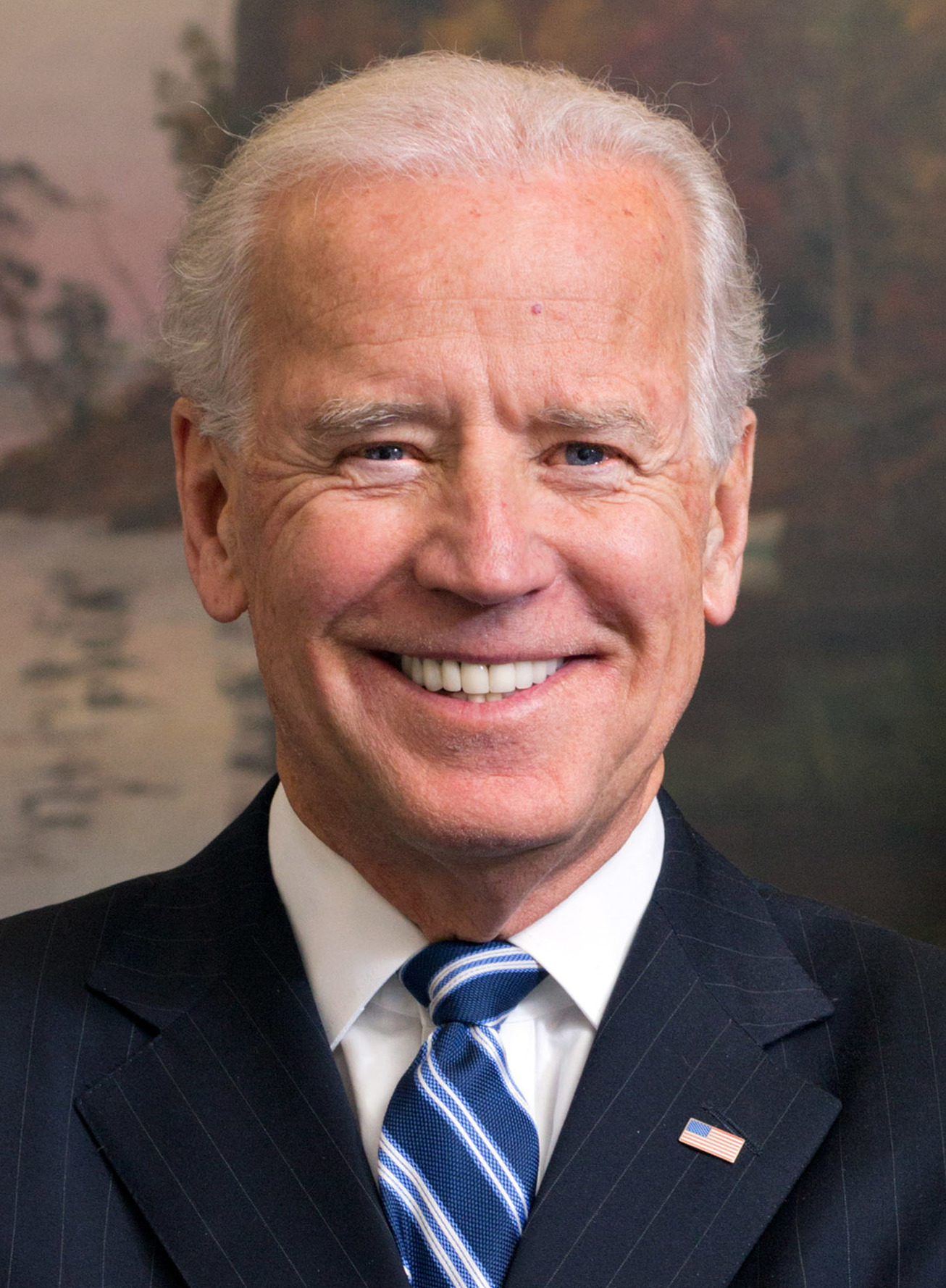
Former Vice President Joe Biden

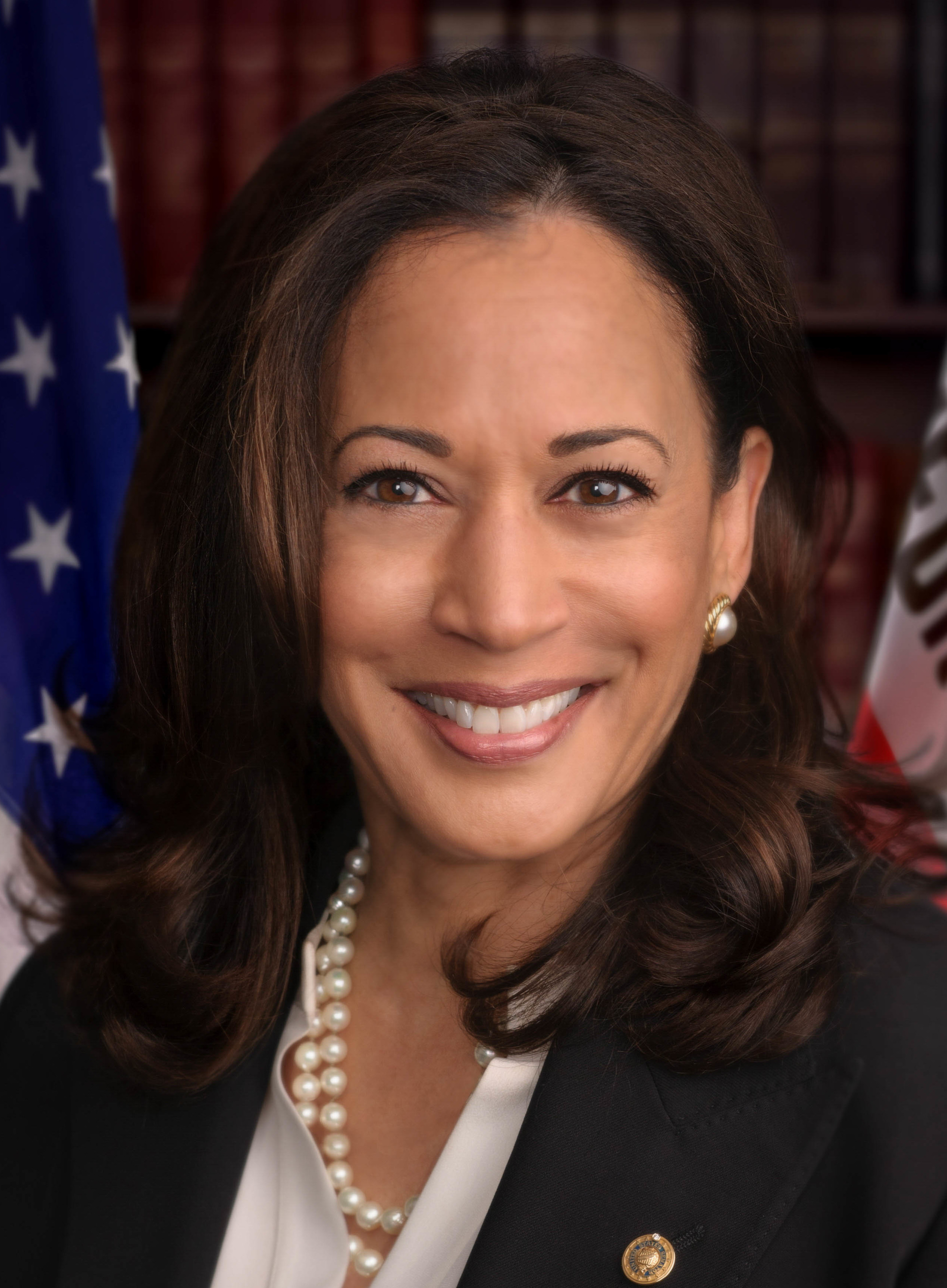
Senator Kamala Harris

Republican Party ticket

President Donald Trump

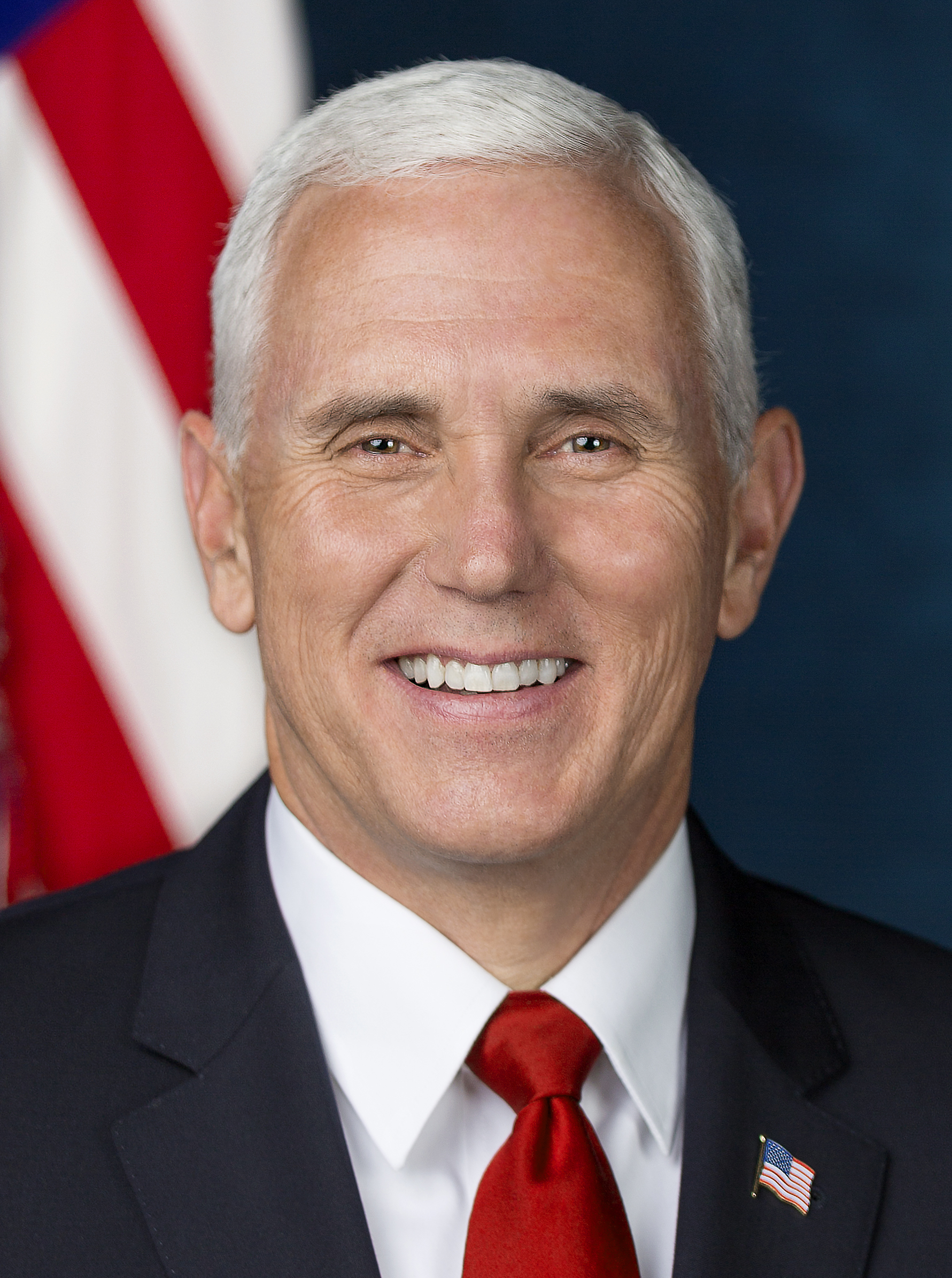
Vice President Mike Pence

== The "invisible primary" and debate period ==
The "invisible primary" is the first phase of any presidential contest, when hopefuls "test the waters" by forming PACS and "exploratory committees" in order to see if such an endeavor is worthwhile. This is followed by the formal announcement of candidacies, and a period of televised debates and other events prior to the beginning of delegate selection.

== January 2020 ==
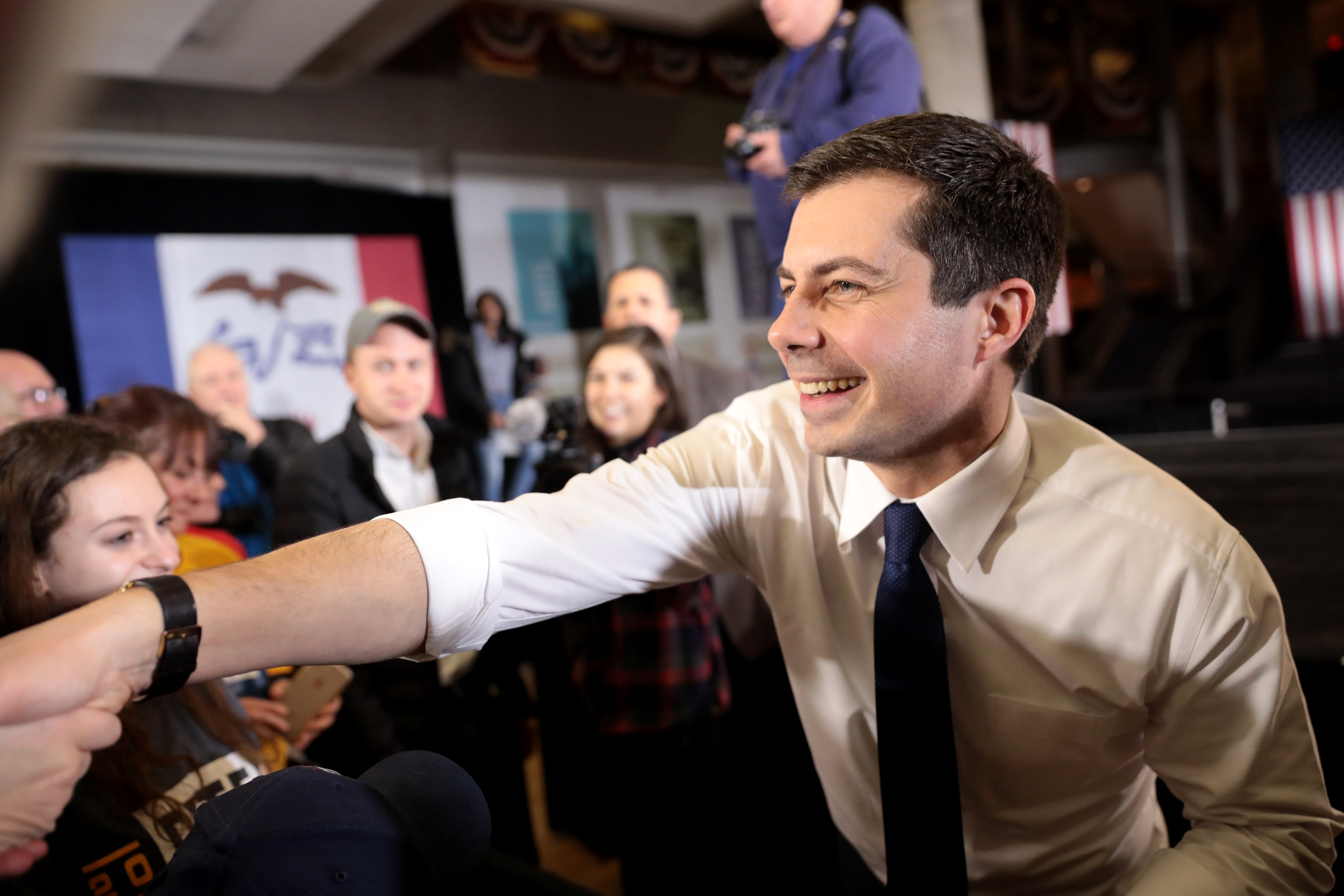
Buttigieg campaigning in Des Moines, Iowa, January 12, 2020

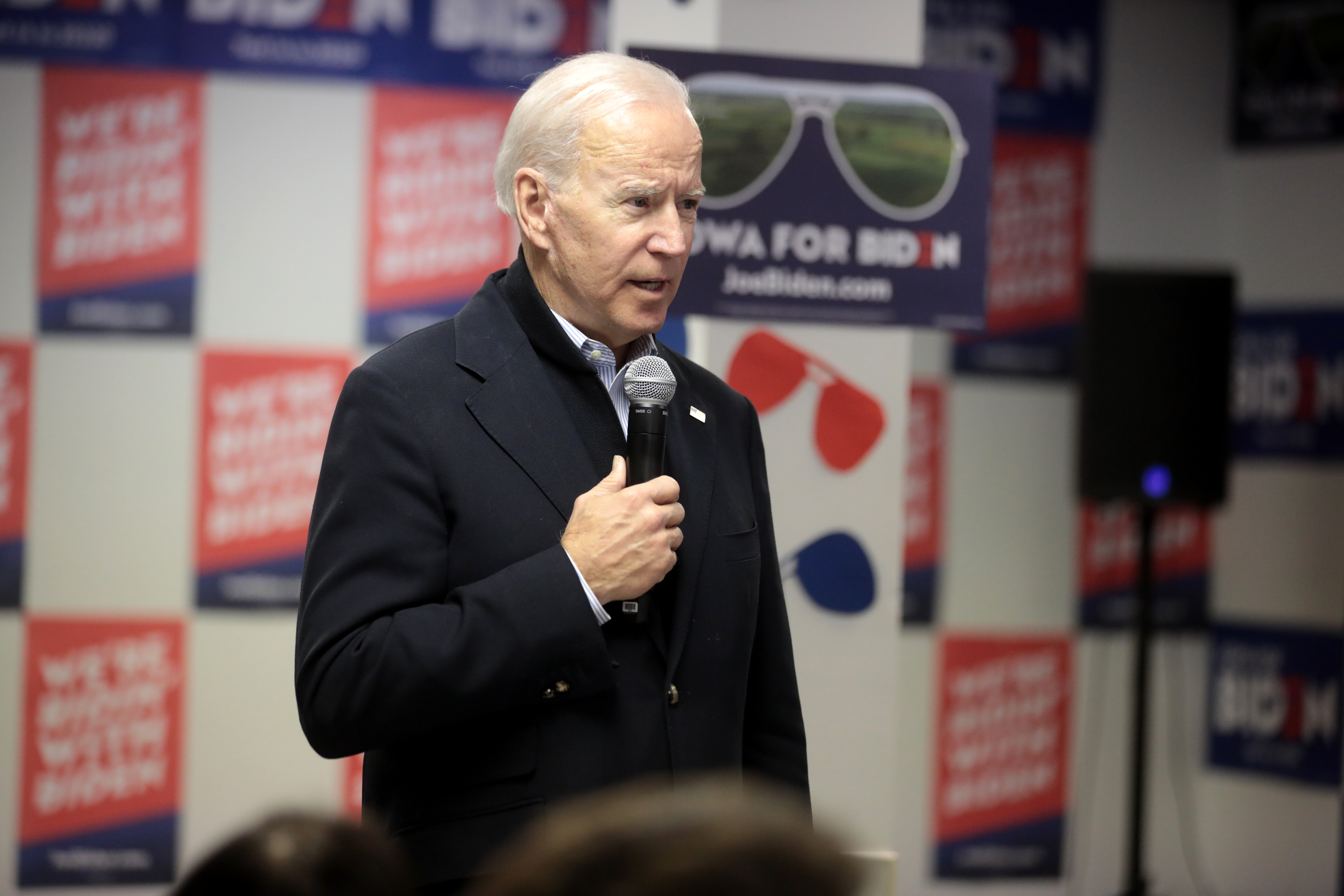
Biden speaking to supporters at his campaign office in Des Moines, Iowa, January 13, 2020

- January 2:
  - Castro drops out of the Democratic primary, after failing to gain traction in the race and struggling to raise enough money to stay solvent.
  - Struggling financially, Williamson lays off her entire campaign staff but pledges to stay in the race with just volunteers.
- January 6: Former Rhode Island governor and senator Lincoln Chafee announces his candidacy for the Libertarian Party nomination.
- January 10:
  - Williamson drops out of the Democratic primary, eight days after laying off her entire campaign staff.
  - Six candidates qualify for the seventh Democratic debate.
- January 13: Struggling financially, and facing the prospect of being forced off the campaign trail to attend the first impeachment trial of Donald Trump in his capacity as a senator, Booker drops out of the Democratic primary.
- January 14: The seventh Democratic debate takes place at Drake University in Des Moines, Iowa.
- January 15–16: The House of Representatives appoints impeachment managers, who then formally present the articles of impeachment to the Senate to begin the first impeachment trial of Donald Trump. This forces the remaining senators running for the Democratic nomination (Bennet, Klobuchar, Sanders, and Warren) off the campaign trail on the days when the trial is in session.
- January 17:
  - The United States Supreme Court agrees to combine and hear Colorado Department of State v. Baca and Chiafalo v. Washington to resolve the question as to whether states can constitutionally punish faithless electors, a ruling that could fundamentally change the outcome of 2020 and future presidential elections.
  - Start of early voting: Minnesota
- January 18:
  - Start of early voting: Vermont, Virginia Democratic primary (In-Person Absentee)
  - The first of a series of North Dakota Republican Party district conventions, which elect delegates to the state party convention. The North Dakota Republican Party does not hold any presidential preference caucus or primary per se, but instead selects their national convention delegates directly at the state party convention.
- January 20: Eight Democratic candidates appear at the Iowa Brown and Black Forum in Des Moines, Iowa.
- January 21: The first case of COVID-19 in the U.S. is confirmed in Washington state.
- January 25: Start of early voting: Michigan
- January 28: The Lesser-Known Candidates Forum takes place at New Hampshire Institute of Politics on the campus of Saint Anselm College in Goffstown, New Hampshire, featuring 17 Republican and 33 Democratic minor candidates.
- January 30: The World Health Organization (WHO) declares the COVID-19 outbreak a Public Health Emergency of International Concern.
- January 31:
  - Unable to gain traction, Delaney drops out of the Democratic race, stating that he does not want to take support from other candidates in the upcoming Iowa caucuses.
  - The Democratic National Committee removes the donor qualification requirements for the ninth and subsequent Democratic debates, paving the way for Bloomberg to participate since he is primarily using his own money instead of accepting individual donations. Several of Bloomberg's opponents complain that this is basically changing the rules in the middle of the game.
  - A group of six Democratic National Committee members discuss potential rule changes designed to weaken Sanders's surging campaign and head off a brokered convention. A DNC spokesman later dismisses the idea.
- January 31: The Kansas Republican Convention assembles, where the second delegation to the national convention is chosen and officially bound to Trump.

== February 2020 ==
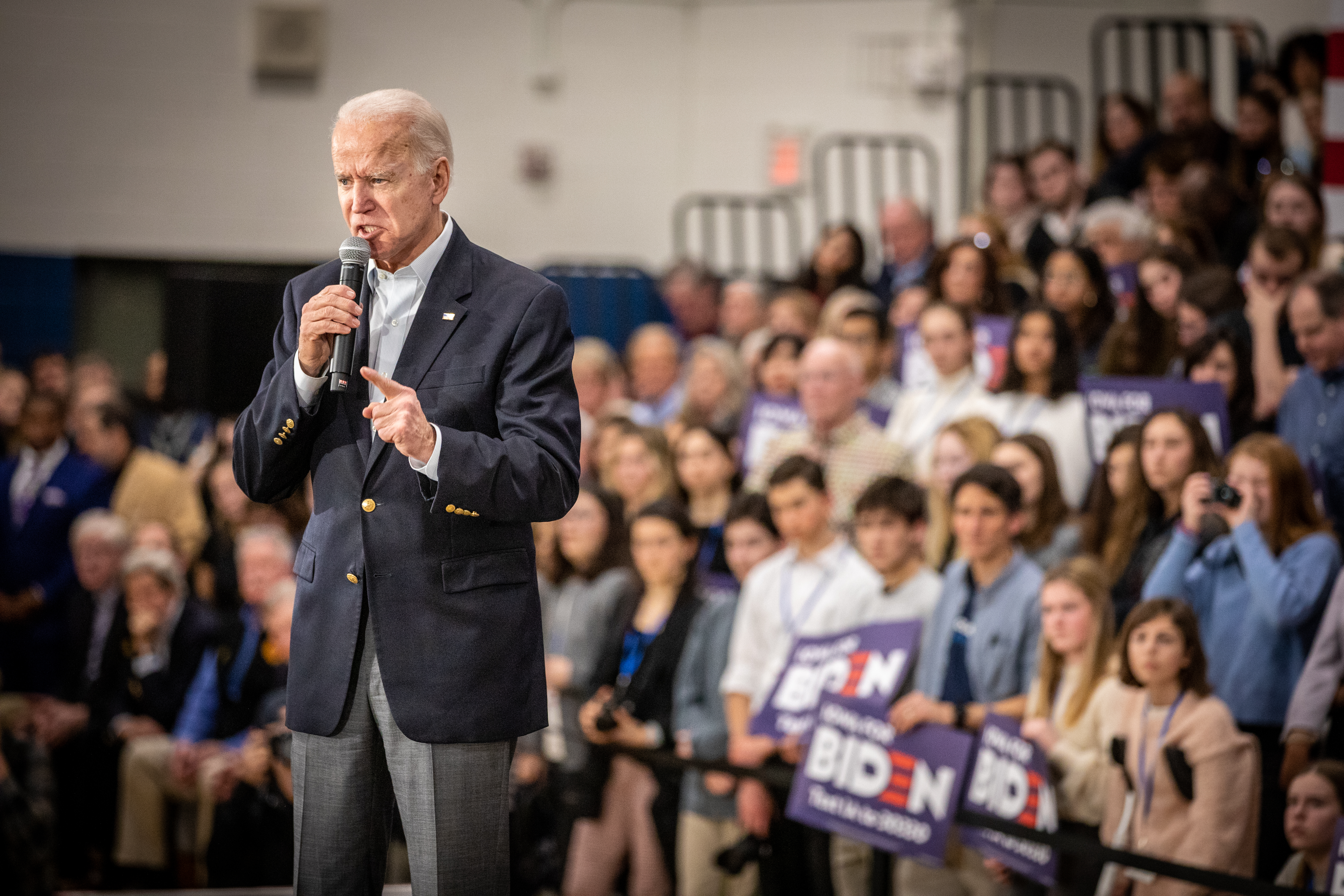
Biden at a rally in Des Moines, Iowa, February 2, 2020

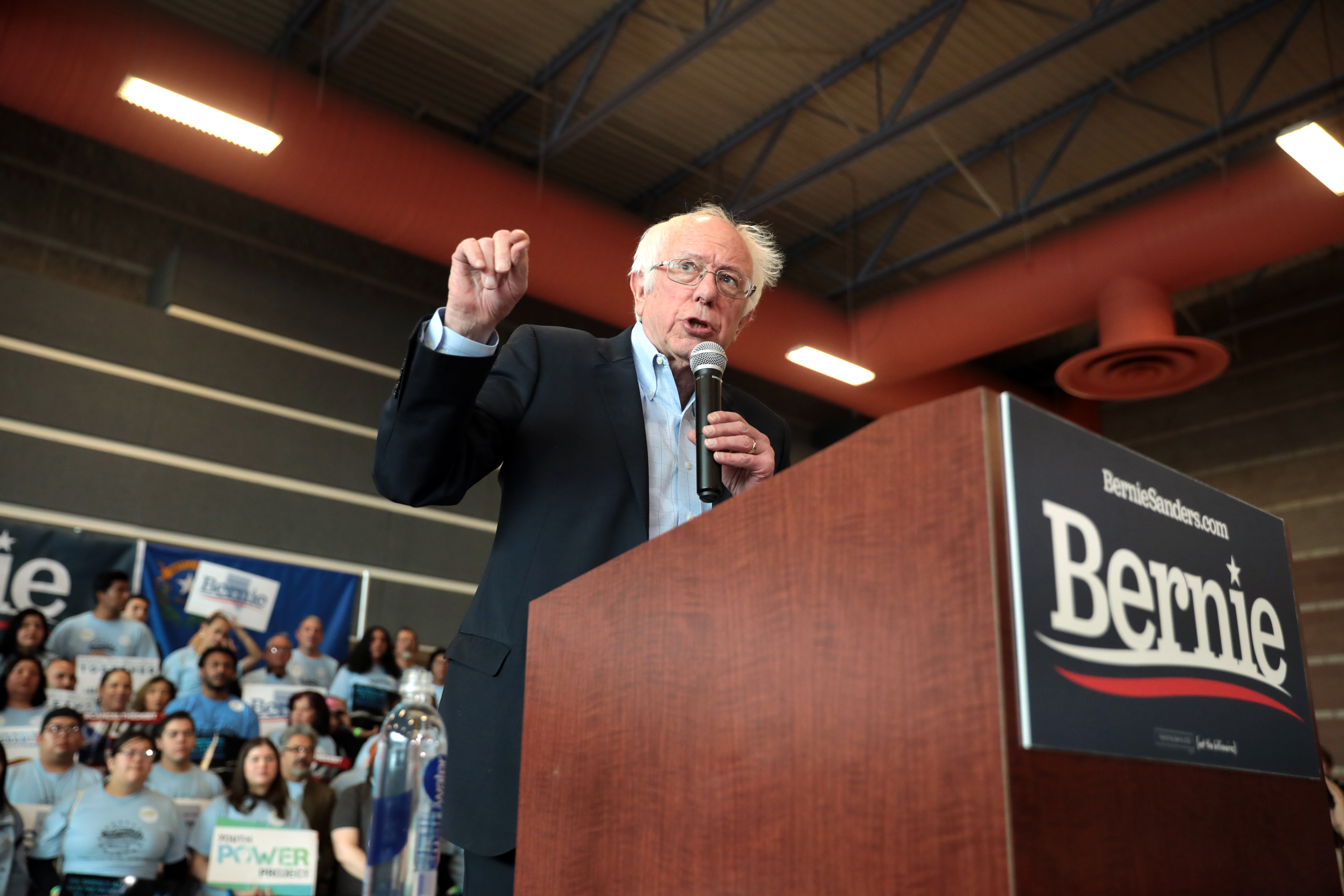
Sanders at a rally in Las Vegas, Nevada, February 15, 2020

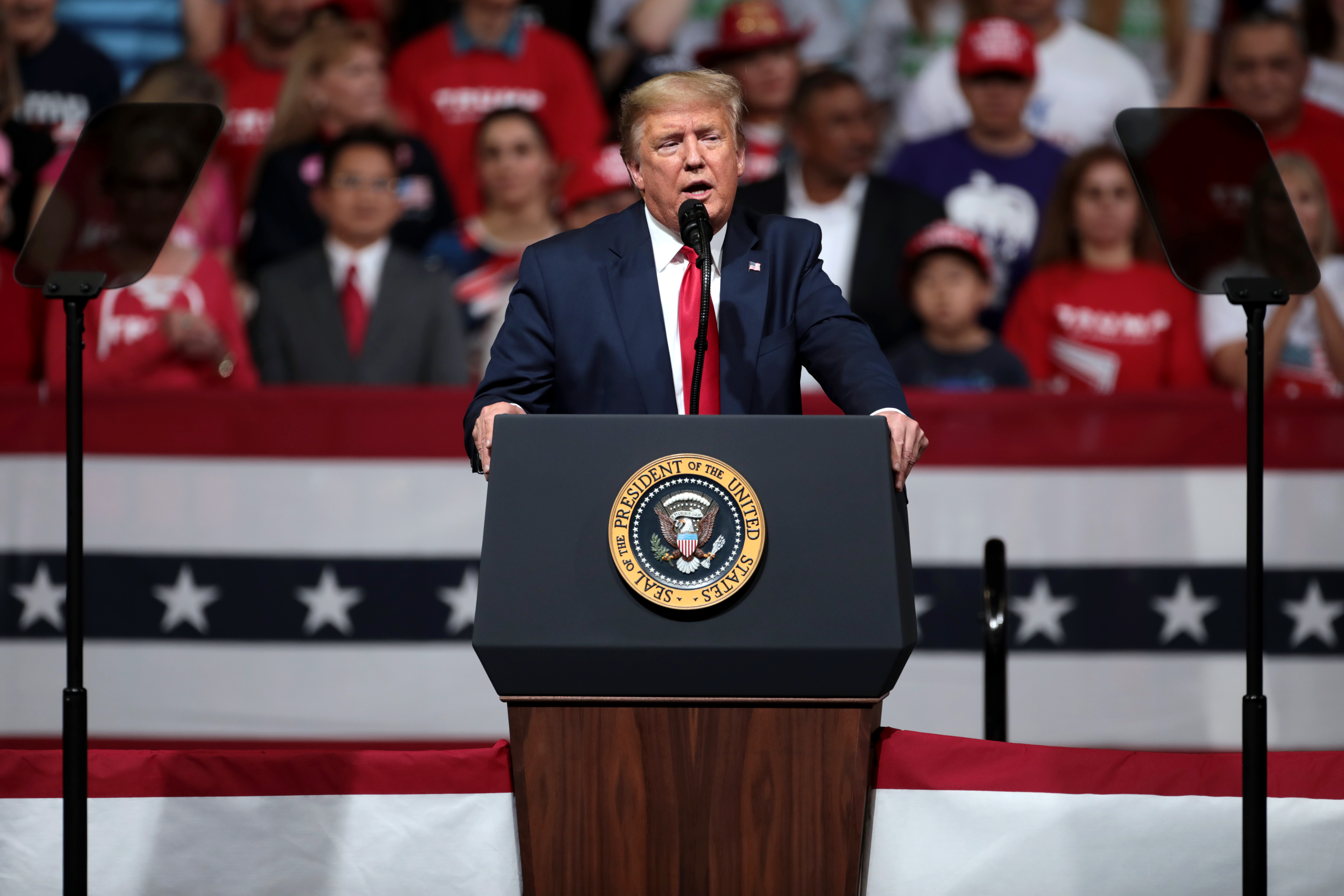
Trump at a rally in Phoenix, Arizona, February 19, 2020

- February 2: Start of early voting: Maine (In-Person Absentee)
- February 3:
  - Iowa Democratic caucuses. Final results are delayed after the Iowa Democratic Party experiences problems with its new app-based reporting system, causing errors and inconsistencies in the counting.
  - Iowa Republican caucuses are won by Trump
  - Start of early voting: California
- February 4:
  - The Nevada Democratic Party scraps the same app system that failed in Iowa, opting to directly use its backup reporting procedures for its state caucuses.
  - The 2020 State of the Union Address, Trump's third State of the Union Address, and the second one after the 1999 address by Bill Clinton to be delivered by an impeached president.
- February 5: The Senate ends the first impeachment trial of Donald Trump and votes to acquit him, well short of the two-thirds super-majority required to convict him.
- February 6: The delays, errors, and inconsistencies surrounding the counting of the results of the Iowa Democratic caucuses prompts Democratic chairman Tom Perez to call for a recanvass. Later that night, the Iowa Democratic Party announces the results of 100 percent of the precincts, showing Buttigieg and Sanders in a virtual tie for the lead (with the former having just a one-tenth of one percentage point advantage over the latter in state delegate equivalents) prompting several news organizations to not actually call a winner at this point. Buttigieg wins 14 pledged delegates, Sanders wins 12 pledged delegates, Warren wins 8 pledged delegates, Biden wins 6 pledged delegates, and Klobuchar wins 1 pledged delegate.
- February 7:
  - Walsh drops out of the Republican primary, accusing the party of being a "cult" in which Trump cannot be beat, and vowing to help the Democratic nomination get elected in the November general election.
  - Eighth Democratic debate, St. Anselm College, Goffstown, New Hampshire.
- February 10: Both Buttigieg and Sanders formally request a recanvass of specific Iowa Caucus precincts.
- February 11:
  - New Hampshire Democratic primary: Sanders wins the popular vote, but his margin of victory over second-place Buttigieg is small enough that both candidates each clinch nine pledged delegates. Klobuchar wins six pledged delegates.
  - Both Bennet and Yang drop out of the Democratic race due to consecutive poor performances in Iowa and New Hampshire.
  - New Hampshire Republican primary is won by Trump
- February 12:
  - After a poor performance in the New Hampshire primary, Patrick drops out of the Democratic race.
  - Start of early voting: Tennessee
- February 13: Start of early voting: North Carolina
- February 15: Start of early voting: Nevada Democratic caucuses
- February 15–17: Moving America Forward infrastructure forum, Las Vegas, Nevada
- February 17: Start of early voting: Arkansas
- February 18: Start of early voting: Texas, Utah
- February 19:
  - Start of early voting: Arizona Democratic primary
  - Ninth Democratic debate, Paris Las Vegas, Las Vegas, Nevada.
- February 21: Start of voting in Washington All voting is by mail.
- February 22:
  - Nevada Democratic caucuses are won by Sanders. Sanders wins 24 pledged delegates, Biden wins 9 pledged delegates, and Buttigieg wins 3 pledged delegates.
  - The Nevada Republican state committee officially binds its state delegation to Trump.
- February 24: Start of early voting: Colorado, Massachusetts
- February 25: Tenth Democratic debate, Gaillard Center, Charleston, South Carolina.
- February 27:
  - The Iowa Democratic Party announces the results of the recount of the Iowa Democratic caucuses, changing Buttigieg's initial 0.003 percent victory in the state delegate equivalents to 0.04 percent.
  - Start of early voting: Oklahoma
- February 29:
  - South Carolina Democratic primary is won by Biden. Biden wins 39 pledged delegates and Sanders wins 15 pledged delegates.
  - Unable to win any delegates during the first four Democratic contests, Steyer drops out of the race.

== March 2020 ==
Democratic primary and caucus calendar maps

Scheduled races as of March 12, 2020

Rescheduled races due to the COVID-19 pandemic

February
March 3 (Super Tuesday)
March 10
March 14–17
March 24–29
April 4–17
April 28
May
June–August

Canceled Republican primaries/caucuses: Alaska, Arizona, Hawaii, Kansas, Nevada, New York, South Carolina, Virginia

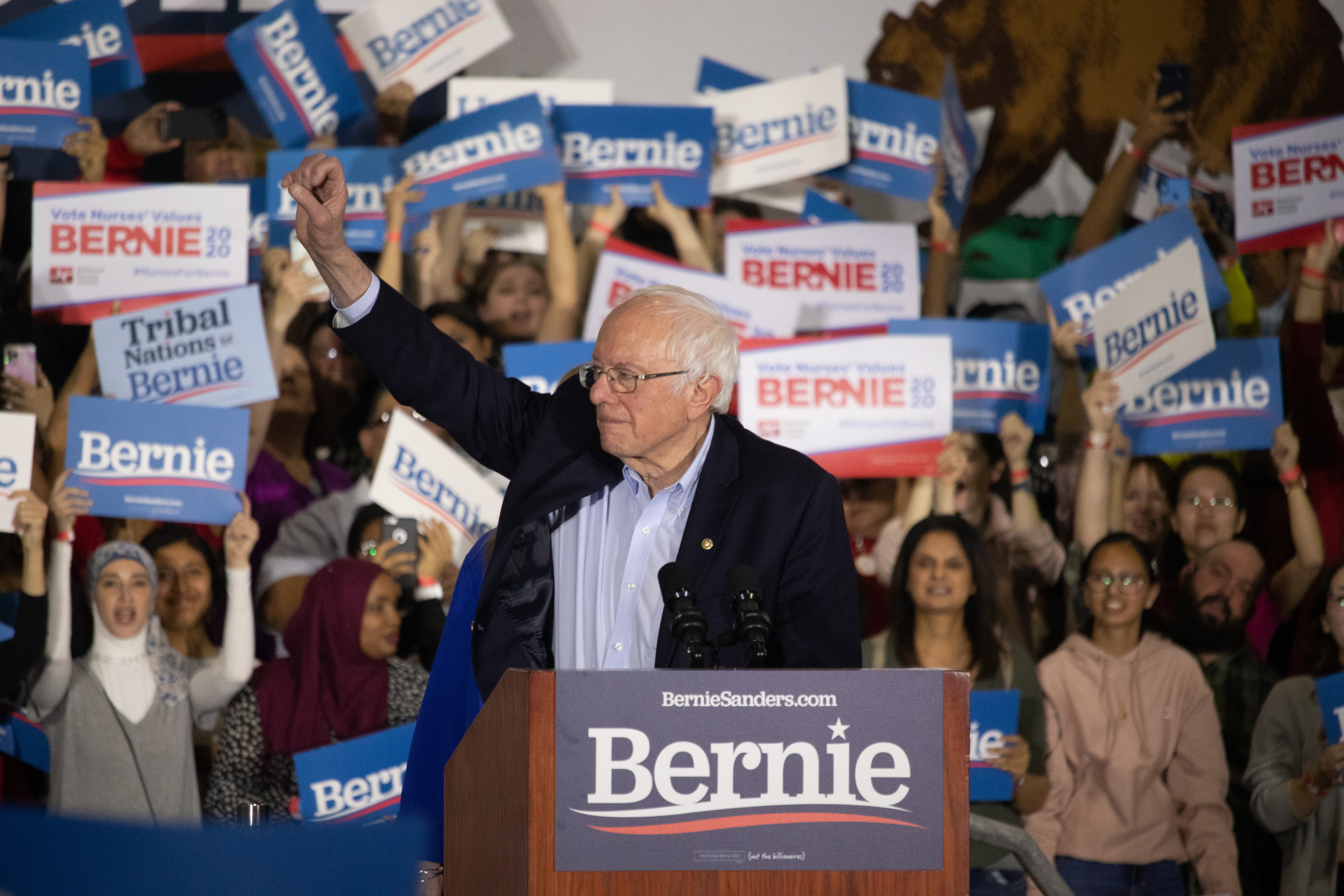
Sanders at a rally in San Jose, California, March 1, 2020

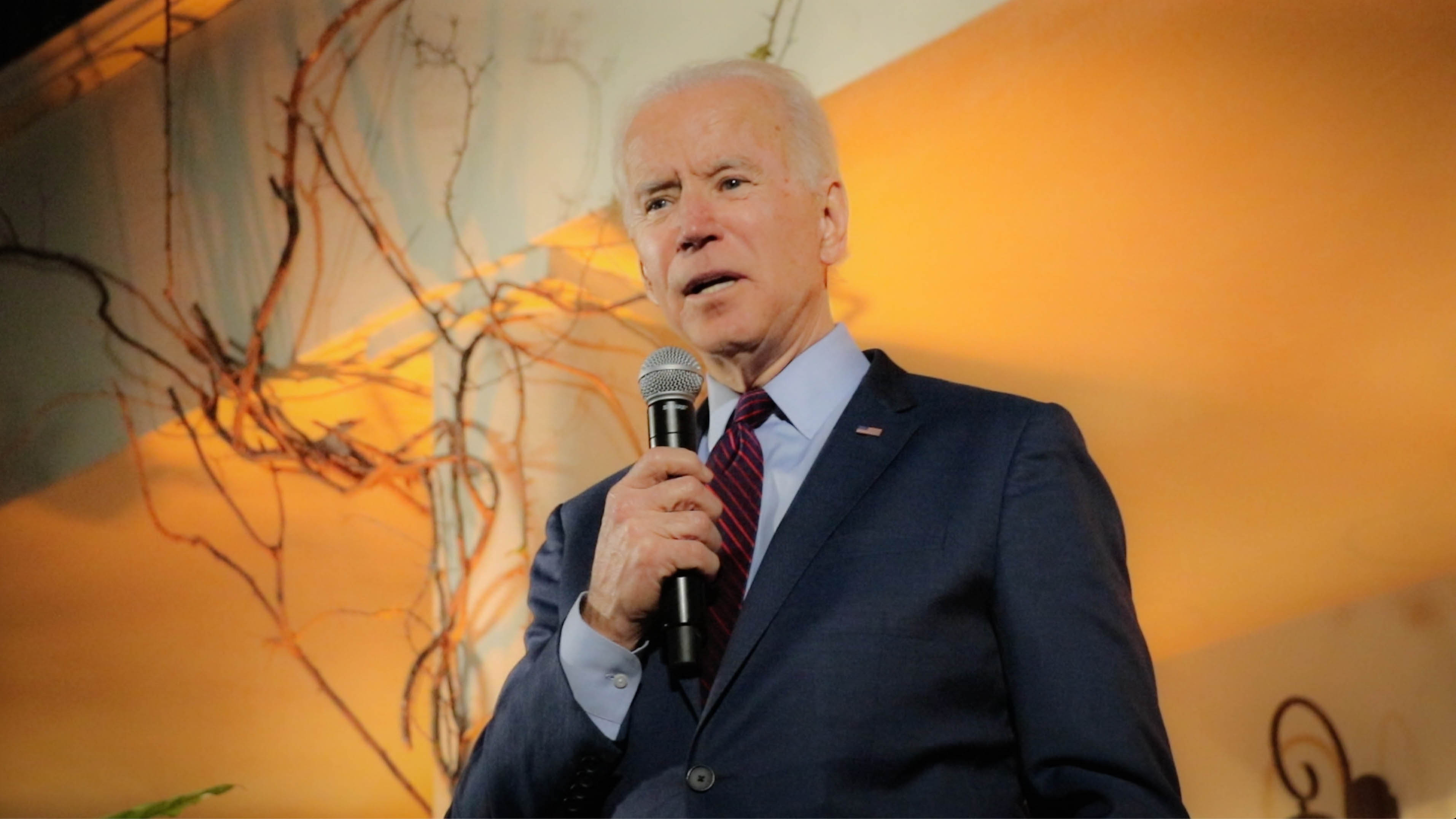
Biden at a campaign event in Bel Air, California, March 5, 2020

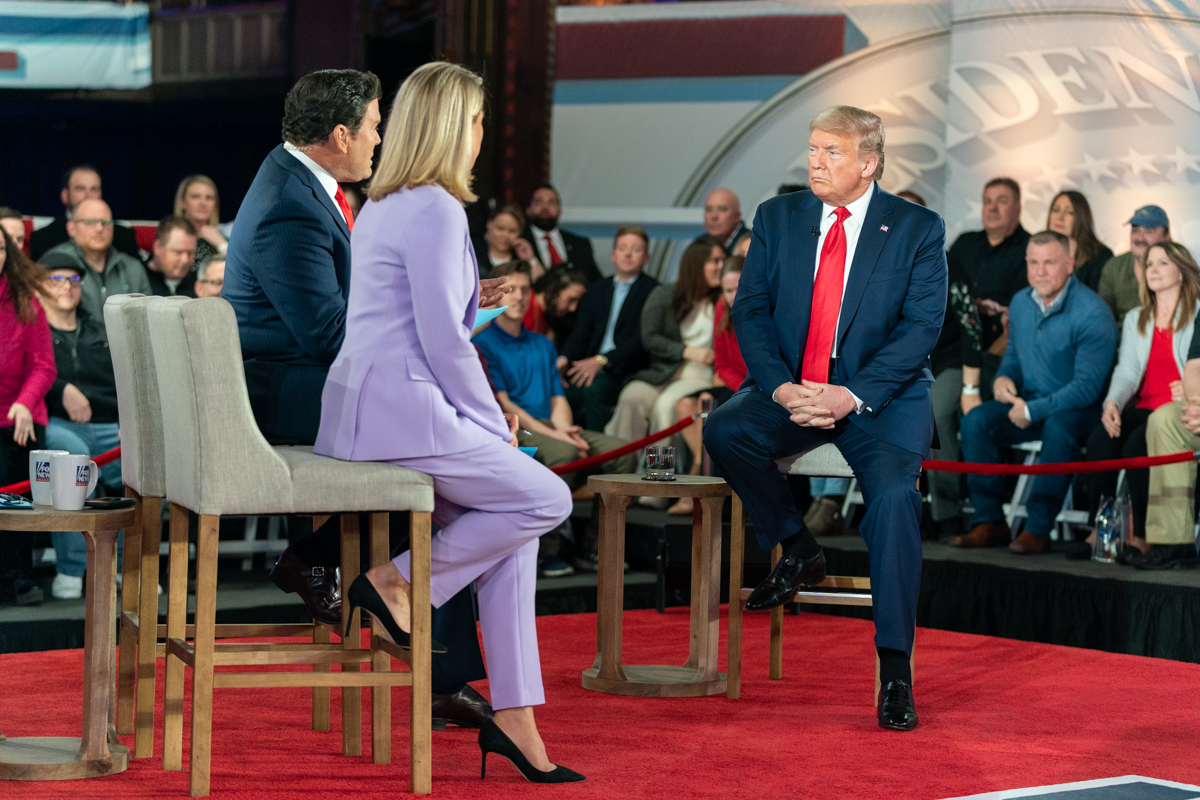
Trump participates in a town hall event hosted by Fox News in Scranton, Pennsylvania, March 5, 2020

- March 1: Following his fourth-place finish in the South Carolina Democratic primary, Buttigieg drops out of the race.
- March 2: Klobuchar drops out of the Democratic race. Both she and Buttigieg then endorse, and urge moderate Democrats to rally around, Biden.
- March 3 (Super Tuesday):
  - The New York Republican Party cancels its primary after Trump is the only candidate to submit the required number of names of his delegates. The candidates for delegate are declared elected.
  - Voting begins in the Democrats Abroad primary
  - Democratic primaries/caucuses:
    - Biden wins ten states: Alabama, Arkansas, Maine, Massachusetts, Minnesota, North Carolina, Oklahoma, Tennessee, Texas, and Virginia
    - Bloomberg wins American Samoa
    - Sanders wins four states: California, Colorado, Utah, and Vermont
  - Republican primaries:
    - Trump runs unopposed in Maine and Minnesota.
    - Trump wins the other 11 states: Alabama, Arkansas, California, Colorado, Massachusetts, North Carolina, Oklahoma, Tennessee, Texas, Utah, and Vermont
- March 4:
  - After an overall poor performance on Super Tuesday, Bloomberg drops out of the Democratic race and endorses Biden.
  - The Free & Equal Elections Foundation sponsors a debate at the Hilton Chicago in Chicago, Illinois, attended by various third-party candidates, and minor Democratic and Republican candidates.
- March 5: After an overall poor performance on Super Tuesday, including in her home state of Massachusetts, Warren drops out of the Democratic race.
- March 10:
  - Due to concerns regarding the COVID-19 outbreak, both Biden and Sanders cancel their Ohio rallies. The Democratic National Committee also announces that the 11th Democratic debate on March 15 will be held without an audience.
  - Voting period ends in the Democrats Abroad primary, with counting expected to be completed on March 23.
  - Democratic primaries/caucuses:
    - Washington, in which all voting is by mail, becomes too close to call with numerous votes still remaining to be counted.
    - Four states are called for Biden: Idaho, Michigan, Mississippi, and Missouri
    - North Dakota is called for Sanders
  - Republican primaries/caucuses:
    - Trump runs unopposed in North Dakota (non-binding race) and Washington.
    - Trump wins the four other states: Idaho, Michigan, Mississippi, and Missouri
- March 11: The WHO declares COVID-19 a pandemic.
- March 12: Due to the COVID-19 pandemic, the Democratic National Committee moves the 11th Democratic debate on March 15 from Phoenix, Arizona to the CNN studios in Washington, D.C.
- March 13:
  - Trump declares a national emergency regarding the COVID-19 pandemic.
  - Louisiana becomes the first state to postpone its primaries because of the COVID-19 pandemic, moving them from April 4 to June 20.
- March 14:
  - Northern Mariana Islands Democratic caucuses are won by Sanders.
  - The Guam Republican Convention directly holds the territory's national delegate selection process, officially pledging all of its delegates to Trump.
  - Georgia moves its primaries from March 24 to May 19 after a public health emergency is declared in the state due to the COVID-19 pandemic.
- March 15:
  - The Northern Mariana Islands Republican caucuses select national delegates bound to Trump.
  - Eleventh Democratic debate, CNN studios in Washington, D.C.
- March 16:
  - After a 13-day delay in counting all the mail-in ballots, Biden is declared the winner of the Washington Democratic primary, narrowly beating Sanders by 21,000 out of over 2 million votes.
  - Kentucky moves its primaries from May 19 to June 23 due to the COVID-19 pandemic.
  - After an Ohio judge denies Governor Mike DeWine's attempt to move his state's primaries from March 17 to June because of the COVID-19 pandemic, DeWine and Ohio's health department still orders all polling places to remain closed.
- March 17:
  - The Ohio Supreme Court allows DeWine to proceed with postponing their primaries to June 2.
  - Maryland becomes the fifth state to postpone its primaries because of the COVID-19 pandemic, moving them from April 28 to June 2.
  - The Democratic National Committee calls for more states to allow voting-by-mail to cut down the number of postponed races.
  - Democratic primaries: Biden wins all three states: Arizona, Florida, Illinois
  - Republican primaries: Trump wins both Florida and Illinois, clinching enough delegates to officially become the presumptive nominee of the Republican Party.
- March 18:
  - With Trump clinching enough Republican delegates, Weld drops out of the race.
  - American Samoa Republican caucuses
  - The North Dakota Republican Party cancels its state convention and formal presidential selection meeting, originally scheduled for March 27–29, due to the COVID-19 pandemic. The party states it will schedule an alternate mail-only option.
- March 19:
  - Gabbard drops out of the Democratic race and endorses Biden.
  - Connecticut postpone its primaries because of the COVID-19 pandemic, moving them from April 28 to June 2.
- March 20:
  - Indiana moves its primaries because of the COVID-19 pandemic, postponing them from May 5 to June 2.
  - The April 4 in-person voting in the Hawaii Democratic primary is canceled in favor of mail-in voting.
- March 21: The Puerto Rico Democratic primary is moved from March 29 to April 26 because of the COVID-19 pandemic.
- March 22: The April 4 in-person voting in the Wyoming Democratic caucuses is canceled in favor of mail-in voting. The deadline is extended to April 17.
- March 23:
  - The results of the Democrats Abroad primary are announced, with Sanders winning that race.
  - Rhode Island moves its primaries from April 28 to June 2 because of the COVID-19 pandemic.
  - The April 4 in-person voting in the Alaska Democratic primary is canceled, but mail-in voting is extended to April 10.
- March 24: Delaware moves its primaries from April 28 to June 2 because of the COVID-19 pandemic.
- March 25: After previously moving their primaries from March 17 to June 2, Ohio decides to cancel in-person voting, and moves the deadline for mail-in voting back to April 28.
- March 26: Pennsylvania moves its primaries from April 28 to June 2 because of the COVID-19 pandemic.
- March 27: Mail-in voting in the Hawaii Democratic primary is extended to May 22.
- March 28: New York becomes the last of the originally scheduled April 28 "Acela primary" states to postpone their primaries because of the COVID-19 pandemic, moving theirs to June 23.

== April 2020 ==
- April 1: West Virginia moves its primaries from May 12 to June 9 because of the COVID-19 pandemic.
- April 2:
  - The Democratic National Convention is moved from July 13–16 to August 17–20 because of the COVID-19 pandemic.
  - After previously moving it from March 29 to April 26, the Puerto Rico Democratic primary is put on indefinite hold.
- April 4: Voting begins in the U.S. Virgin Islands Republican caucuses
- April 5: Lincoln Chafee drops out of the Libertarian race.
- April 6:
  - The Wisconsin Supreme Court denies Governor Tony Evers's attempt to move his state's primaries from April 7 to June because of the COVID-19 pandemic.
  - The U.S. Supreme Court issues its ruling in Republican National Committee v. Democratic National Committee, overturning a U.S. District Court's order that would have extended Wisconsin's absentee voting deadline to April 13. The U.S. Supreme Court however still allows the district court's ruling to delay the primary results to April 13.
- April 7: The Wisconsin primaries are held, with the results delayed to April 13 per the district court's ruling.
- April 8:
  - Sanders suspends his campaign, acknowledging that his "path toward victory is virtually impossible", effectively making Biden the Democratic Party's presumptive nominee. Sanders also announces that he is still staying on the ballot in the remaining primaries, collecting as many national convention delegates as he can so they can significantly influence the Democratic Party's platform.
  - New Jersey moves its primaries from June 2 to July 7 because of the COVID-19 pandemic.
- April 9: After previously moving it from April 24 to May 19 because of the COVID-19 pandemic, Georgia moves its primaries further to June 9.
- April 10: Mail-in voting ends in the Alaska Democratic primary. Biden is declared the winner.
- April 13:
  - Sanders gives his endorsement to Biden in a livestream broadcast.
  - The results of the Wisconsin primaries are announced. Trump had run unopposed in the Republican primary. Biden is declared the winner in the Wisconsin Democratic primary.
- April 14:
  - Trump pledges to halt U.S. funding to the WHO while reviewing its role in "severely mismanaging and covering up the spread of the coronavirus".
  - After previously moving it from April 4 to June 20 because of the COVID-19 pandemic, Louisiana moves its primaries further to July 11.
- April 17:
  - After previously moving it from April 28 to June 2 because of the COVID-19 pandemic, Connecticut moves its primaries further to August 11.
  - Mail-in voting ends in the Wyoming Democratic caucuses. Biden is declared the winner after the results are completed two days later.
- April 27: After previously being moved from April 28 to June 23 because of the COVID-19 pandemic, the New York Democratic primary is canceled altogether. New York State election officials say that Biden is the only viable candidate left in the race, and canceling it would save the state millions of dollars from printing the extra sheet on the ballot.
- April 28:
  - Mail-in voting ends in the Ohio primaries. Trump had run unopposed in the Republican primary. Biden is declared the winner in the Ohio Democratic primary.
  - United States congressman Justin Amash announces a presidential exploratory committee for the Libertarian nomination.
- April 30: Biden announces that his vice presidential selection committee will consist of former senator Chris Dodd of Connecticut, mayor Eric Garcetti of Los Angeles, former counsel to the vice president Cynthia Hogan, and representative Lisa Blunt Rochester of Delaware.

== May 2020 ==
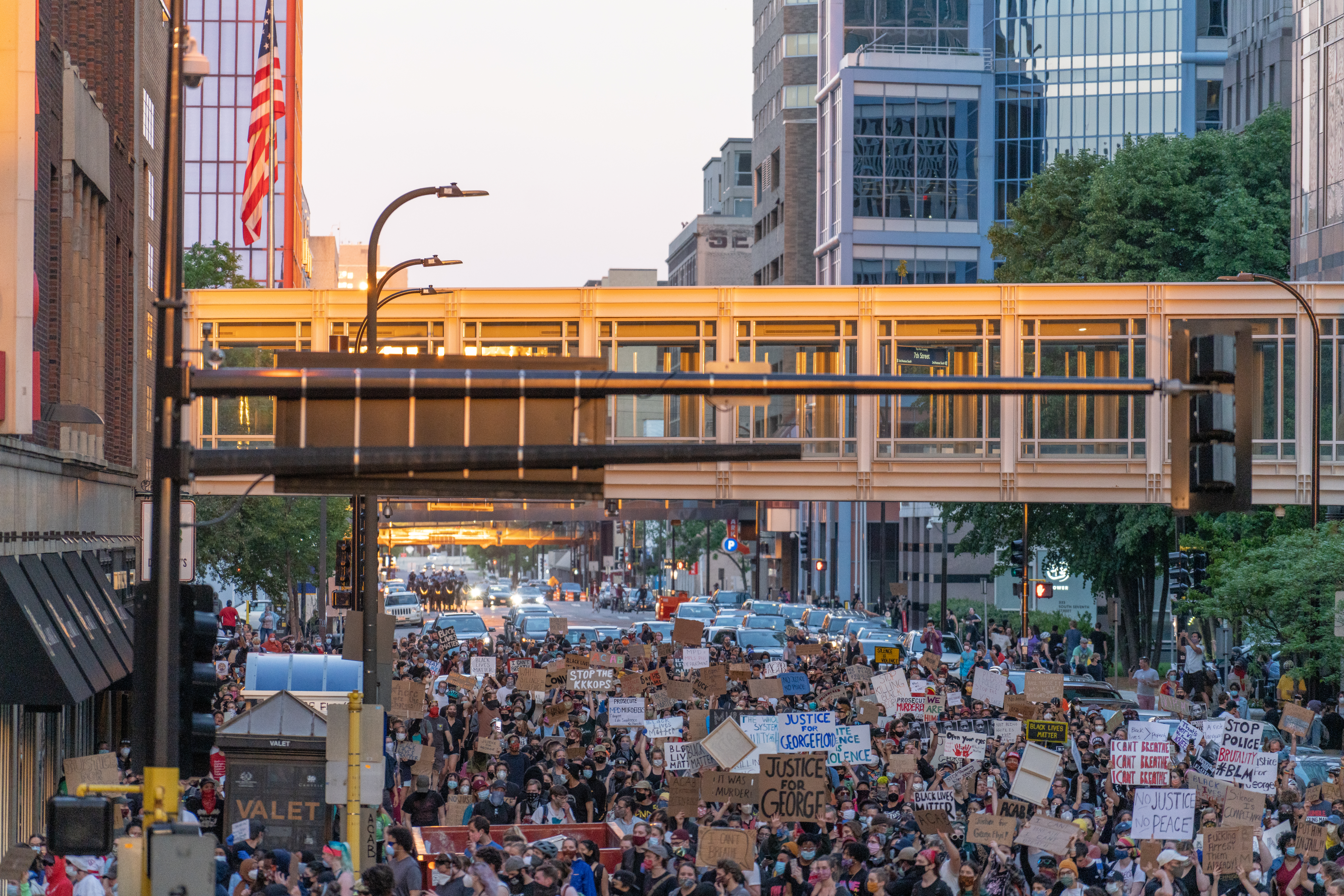
Protesters gather in downtown Minneapolis following the murder of George Floyd, May 28, 2020

- May 2: Biden wins the Kansas Democratic primary.
- May 5: A U.S. District judge rules that the New York Democratic primary must proceed on June 23.
- May 7:
  - After previously moving it from April 28 to June 2 because of the COVID-19 pandemic, Delaware moves its primaries further to July 7.
  - The Department of Justice files a motion to dismiss United States v. Flynn and not pursue charges against former National Security Advisor Michael Flynn for making false statements to the FBI regarding his communications with Russian ambassador Sergey Kislyak during the Trump presidential transition.
- May 12:
  - Emmet G. Sullivan, the US District judge presiding over United States v. Flynn, places a hold on the DOJ's move to drop charges against Flynn, and then appoints attorney John Gleeson as an amicus curiae to prepare an argument against dismissal.
  - In Nebraska, Trump wins that state's Republican primary and Biden wins the Nebraska Democratic primary.
- May 19:
  - Flynn's attorney files an emergency petition for a writ of mandamus in the D.C. Circuit Court of Appeals, asking to overturn Judge Sullivan's recent orders and that he be removed from presiding over United States v. Flynn.
  - In Oregon, Trump wins that state's Republican primary and Biden wins the Oregon Democratic primary.
- May 21: After being postponed indefinitely, the 2020 Puerto Rico Democratic primary is rescheduled for July 12.
- May 22: Mail-in voting ends in the Hawaii Democratic primary. Biden is declared the winner.
- May 22–25: The 2020 Libertarian National Convention is held online due to the COVID-19 pandemic. Jo Jorgensen is officially chosen as the Libertarian Party's presidential nominee, and Spike Cohen becomes the party's vice presidential nominee.
- May 25–26: Forty-six-year old black man George Floyd is murdered in Minneapolis by white police officer Derek Chauvin, who kneels on Floyd's neck for approximately nine minutes while Floyd is handcuffed face down in the street. Floyd's murder is recorded and shared live by bystanders. The following day, peaceful protests and violent riots begin to erupt across the country and globally.
- May 30: Voting ends in the U.S. Virgin Islands Republican caucuses, with Trump winning the race.
- May 31: Blaming "far-left extremist" groups for inciting and organizing the violent riots across the country during the Floyd protests, Trump announces that he plans to designate one of them, Antifa, as a terrorist organization. Various government and non-government officials respond by claiming that designating such domestic organizations as terrorist groups would be prohibited under both federal law and the First Amendment due to concerns pertaining to the latter's freedom of speech and freedom of assembly rights.

== June 2020 ==
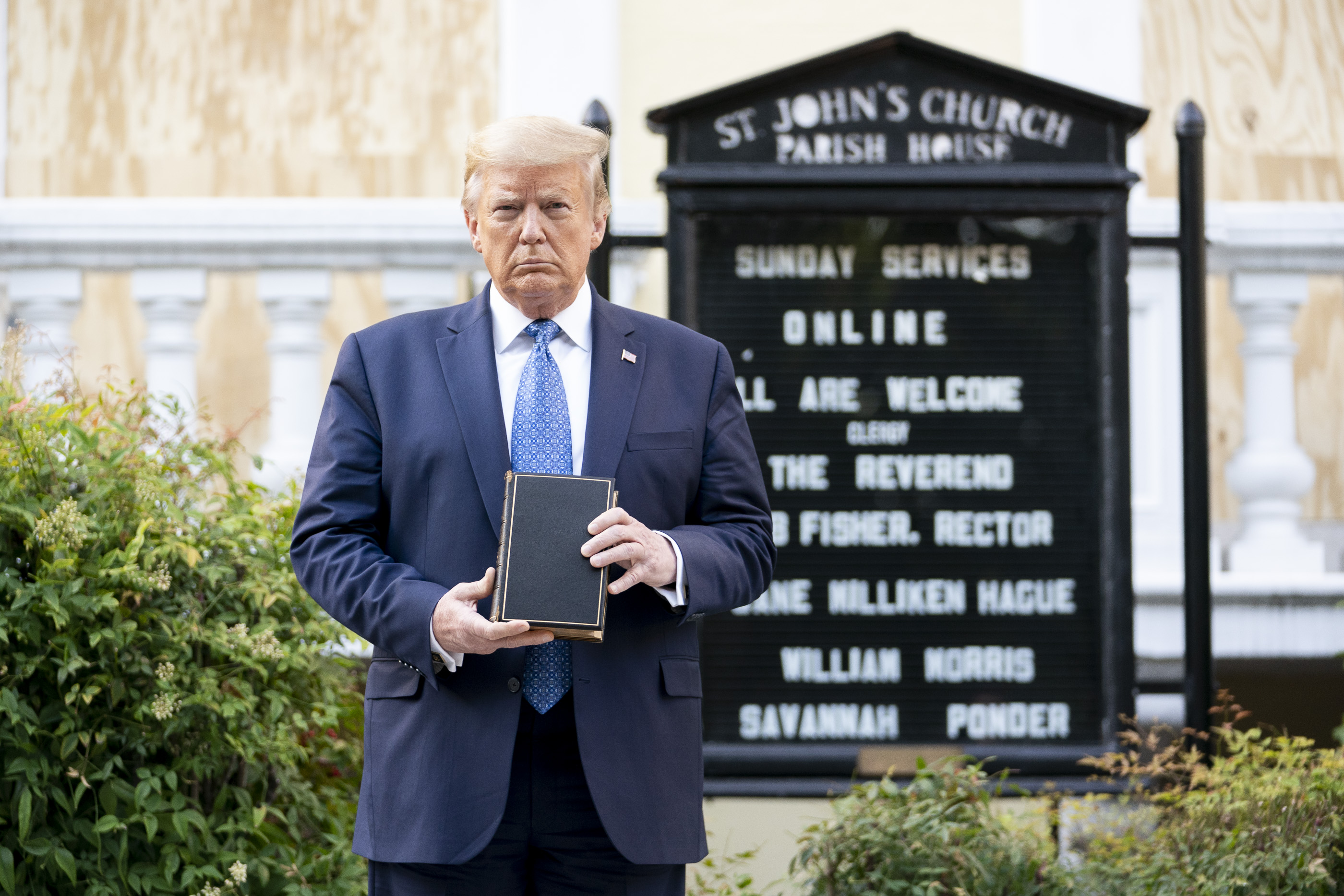
The Donald Trump photo-op at St. John's Church, June 1, 2020

- June 1:
  - In Philadelphia, Biden makes his first campaign stop in months after the COVID-19 pandemic lockdowns, discussing race relations and Floyd's murder.
  - Trump threatens to invoke the Insurrection Act of 1807 and deploy the U.S. military in response to the unrest.
  - Police and National Guard troops forcefully clear peaceful protesters from Lafayette Square and surrounding streets in Washington, D.C., so Trump can walk from the White House to the St. John's Episcopal Church for a photo-op outside the historic church, which burned during the Floyd protests during the previous night. The forceful clearing of the protesters from the area is widely condemned as excessive and an affront to the freedom of assembly clause of the First Amendment.
- June 2:
  - The Republican National Convention is pulled out of Charlotte, North Carolina, on grounds that the state's plan to continue its COVID-19 pandemic lockdowns through August would prevent a full-scale convention.
  - Democratic primaries: Biden wins all eight contests to come within a few dozen delegates of clinching the nomination: District of Columbia, Indiana, Maryland, Montana, New Mexico, Pennsylvania, Rhode Island, and South Dakota
  - Republican primaries: Trump wins all eight contests: District of Columbia, Indiana, Maryland, Montana, New Mexico, Pennsylvania, Rhode Island, South Dakota
- June 3: In a piece published by The Atlantic, former defense secretary Jim Mattis criticizes Trump's response to the George Floyd protests, and states that he became "angry and appalled" about the events leading up to the violent treatment of noncombative protesters near the White House for the purpose of Trump's photo-op at St. John's Church.
- June 5: The Republican Party of Puerto Rico holds an online vote of party leaders in lieu of an actual primary, awarding all 23 of its pledged delegates Trump.
- June 6: Biden wins both Democratic caucuses in Guam and the U.S. Virgin Islands, clinching enough delegates to officially become the Democratic Party's presumptive nominee.
- June 9:
  - Biden wins both Democratic primaries in Georgia and West Virginia.
  - Trump wins both Republican primaries in Georgia and West Virginia.
- June 10: Trump's presidential campaign demands that CNN withdraw and apologize for its latest opinion poll showing Biden leading by 14 points, claiming it was "designed to mislead American voters through a biased questionnaire and skewed sampling". CNN vice-president David Vigilante defends its poll methodology and rejects the allegations, stating that "this is the first time in its 40-year history that CNN had been threatened with legal action because an American politician or campaign did not like CNN's polling results".
- June 11: The Republican National Committee announces that Jacksonville, Florida will be the new host city of the Republican National Convention. Due to contractual obligations, official convention business will still be conducted in Charlotte.
- June 15: Louis DeJoy is sworn in as postmaster general. Upon taking office he immediately begins taking measures to reduce costs, such as banning the use of overtime and extra trips to deliver mail.
- June 17: Biden addresses a small group of socially distant reporters and local lawmakers during an in-person campaign event in Darby, Pennsylvania.
- June 18: Trump begins pushing for four debates against Biden, rather than just the three originally scheduled in the fall, citing an expected surge in mail and absentee voting because of the COVID-19 pandemic.
- June 20:
  - Hawkins wins both Green primaries in Michigan and Kentucky, clinching enough delegates to officially become the Green Party's presumptive nominee.
  - At the BOK Center in Tulsa, Oklahoma, Trump held his first public rally since the wider activation of the COVID-19 pandemic. It was originally planned for June 19 but was moved because it coincided with Juneteenth, which was deemed insensitive due to both the 1921 Tulsa race massacre and the ongoing George Floyd protests. The total attendance of the rally was lower than was expected; roughly a week prior, Trump claimed that "almost one million" people had requested tickets. However, Tulsa's fire department and the Trump campaign each reported crowd estimates of 6,200 and 12,000, respectively — less than the arena's capacity of around 19,000. It was reported that TikTok users and members of the K-pop fandom had credited themselves with falsely requesting tickets for the rally, as part of a coordinated effort to "troll" Trump. Trump's campaign advisors blamed the media for repeatedly warning people away because of both COVID-19 and protesters. Fox News on the other hand claimed that its coverage of the rally was its highest Saturday primetime viewership in network history, drawing 7.7 million viewers.
- June 22: Biden rejects Trump's request for a fourth debate, committing to only the three originally scheduled in the fall.

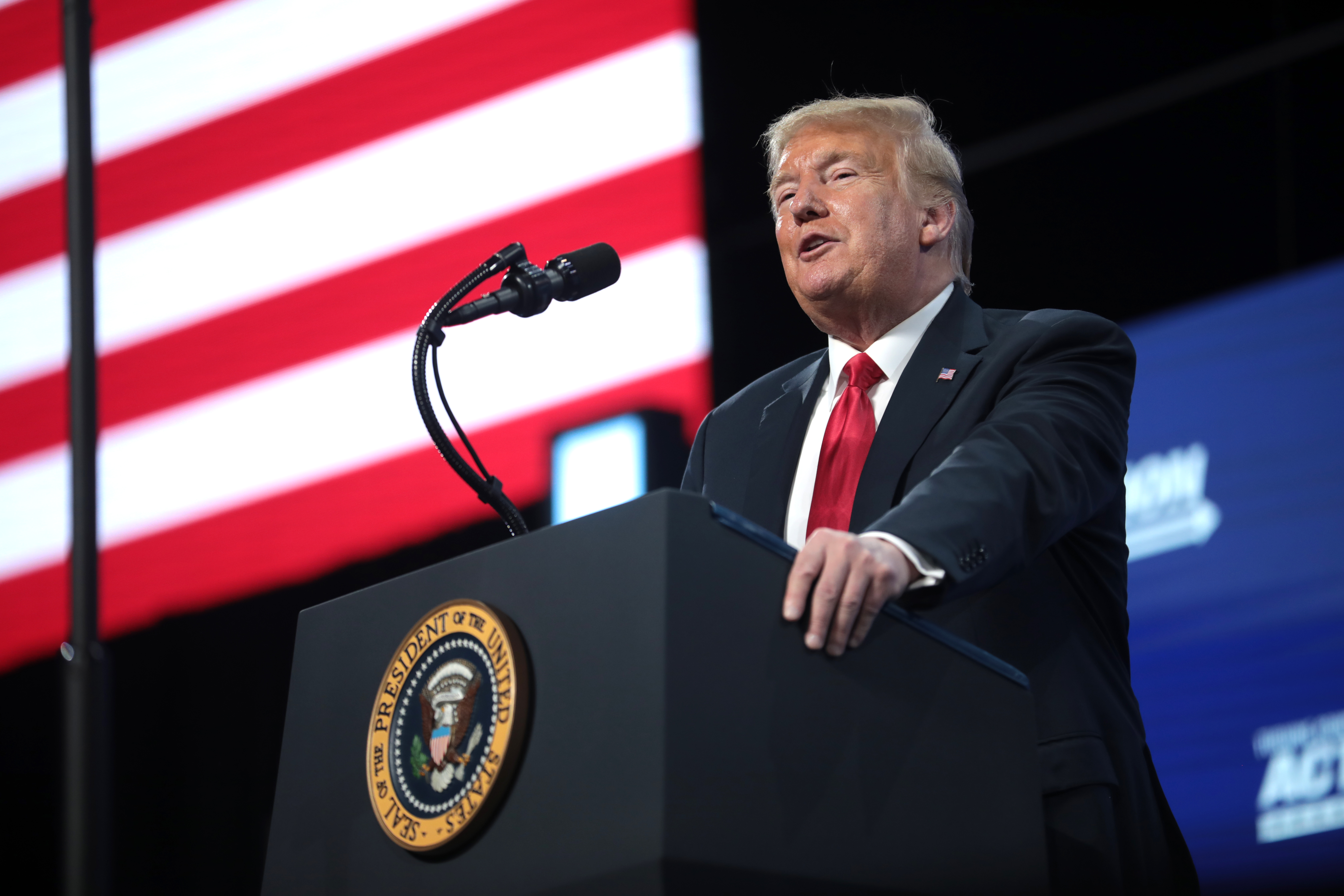
Trump speaking at the Dream City Church in Phoenix, Arizona, June 23, 2020

- June 23:
  - Trump visits Arizona, participating in a roundtable discussion with border and law enforcement officials in Yuma before holding a rally with Students for Trump at Dream City Church in Phoenix.
  - Biden holds a virtual fundraiser with Obama, raising over $7 million.
  - Biden wins both Democratic primaries in Kentucky and New York
  - Trump wins the Kentucky Republican primary
- June 24:
  - A three-member D.C. Circuit Court of Appeals panel grants Flynn's petition for a writ of mandamus, ordering Judge Sullivan to dismiss United States v. Flynn.
  - The Democratic National Committee announces that the Democratic National Convention will be scaled back due to the COVID-19 pandemic, with most events taking place instead via videoconferencing. With all the party's state delegations being asked to participate virtually, the venue will be moved from the Fiserv Forum to the smaller Wisconsin Center. Biden still plans to accept the party's nomination in person instead of also staying home.
- June 30: Biden announces that he does not plan to hold any more campaign rallies due to the COVID-19 pandemic.

== July 2020 ==
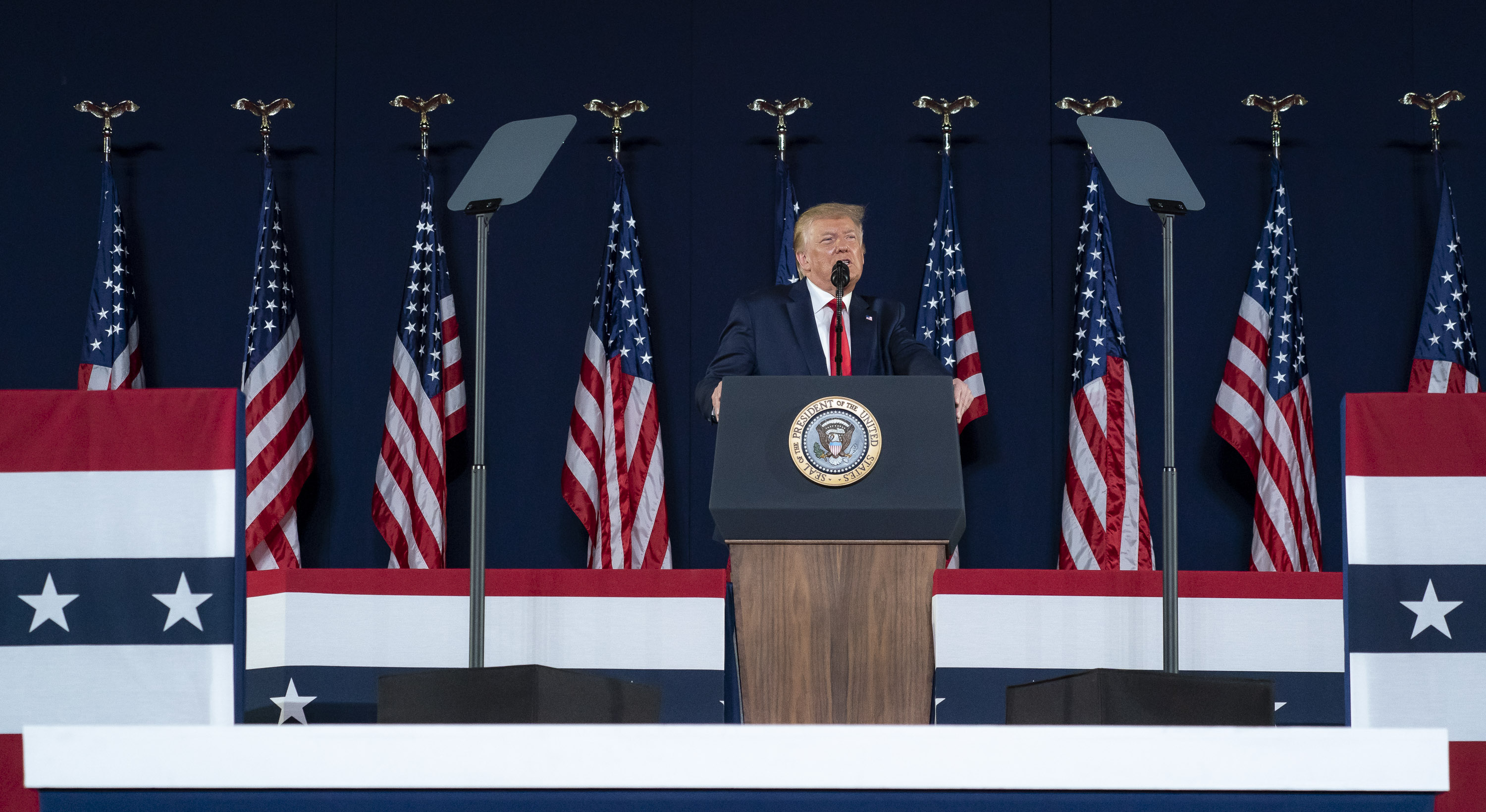
Trump speaks at a Mount Rushmore fireworks celebrations event, July 3, 2020

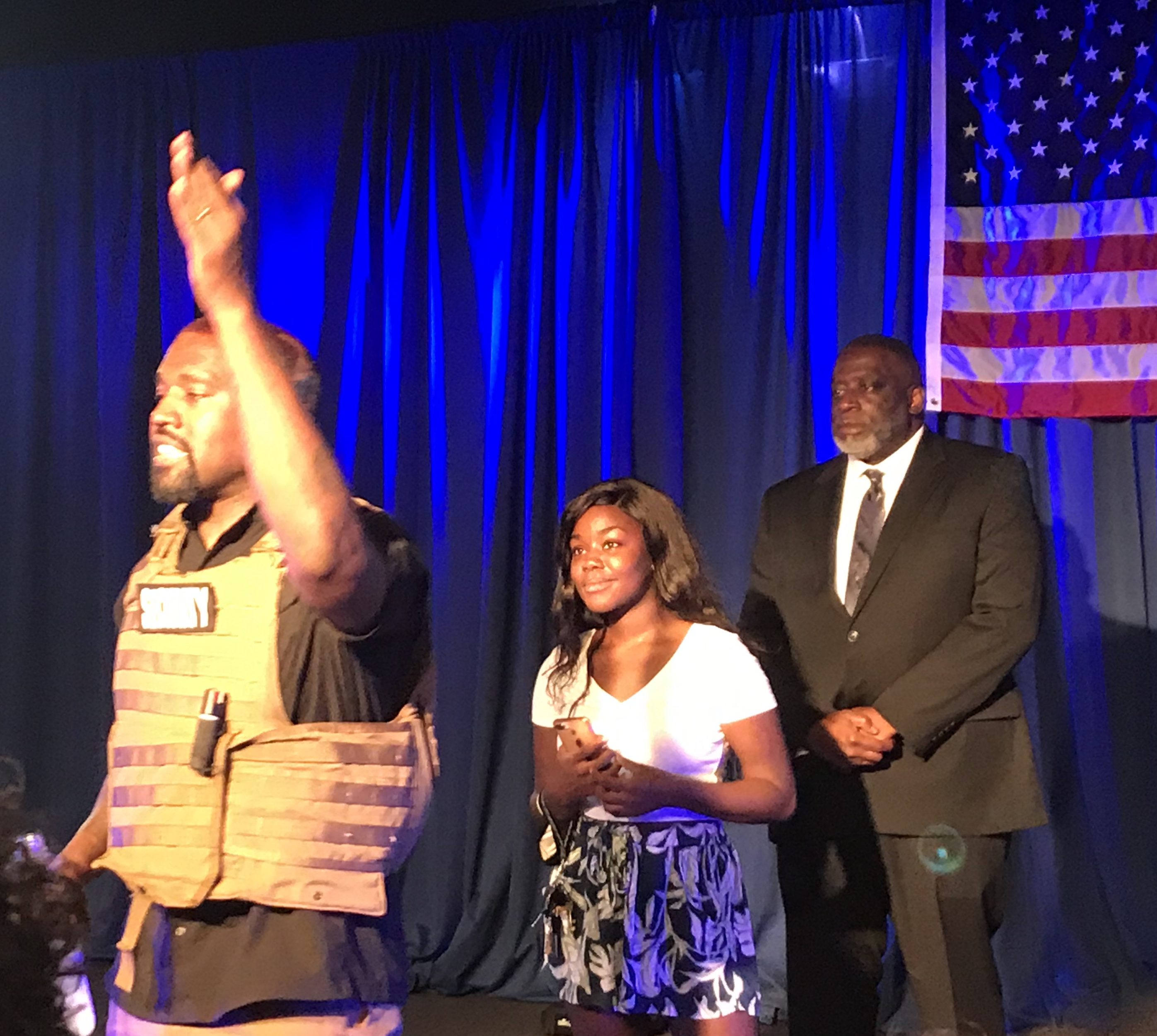
Kanye West (left) at his presidential campaign rally in North Charleston, South Carolina, July 19, 2020

- July 4: Rapper Kanye West announces an independent campaign for president and picks preacher Michelle Tidball as his running mate. However, he does not officially file to run. Various political pundits speculate that his presidential run is instead merely a publicity stunt to promote his upcoming album.
- July 6: The United States Supreme Court delivers its unanimous opinions in both Chiafalo v. Washington and Colorado Department of State v. Baca, ruling that states are free to enforce laws that punish faithless electors.
- July 7:
  - Trump formally notifies the United Nations of his intent to withdraw the U.S. from the WHO.
  - Biden wins both Democratic primaries in Delaware and New Jersey.
  - Trump wins both Republican primaries in Delaware and New Jersey.
- July 9:
  - The United States Supreme Court delivers its decisions in both Trump v. Vance and Trump v. Mazars USA, LLP regarding attempts by the Manhattan district attorney and the House of Representatives, respectively, to subpoena Trump's tax records. In both rulings, the Court orders each case to be sent back to the lower courts for further review, making it unlikely that the president's taxes would be released before the election.
  - Judge Sullivan files a petition asking the entire D.C. Circuit Court of Appeals to rehear the United States v. Flynn case en banc.
- July 9–12: The 2020 Green National Convention is held online due to the COVID-19 pandemic. Howie Hawkins is officially nominated as the Green Party's presidential nominee and Angela Walker becomes the party's vice presidential nominee.
- July 11: In Louisiana, Trump wins that state's Republican primary and Biden wins the Louisiana Democratic Primary.
- July 12:
  - Biden wins the Puerto Rico Democratic primary.
  - Green Party candidate Dario Hunter announces an independent run for the presidency, citing irregularities and undemocratic processes throughout the Green Party presidential primary.
- July 14: The Postal Service warns multiple states that the service would not be able to meet the states' deadlines for requesting and casting last-minute absentee ballots. This assessment is based on the several cost-cutting measures taken by Postmaster General Louis DeJoy since taking office on June 15, such as banning overtime and extra trips to deliver mail, and dismantling and removing hundreds of high-speed mail sorting machines from postal centers.
- July 15:
  - Official paperwork is filed with the Federal Election Commission for Kanye West, under the "BDY Party" affiliation amid claims that he is preparing to drop out.
  - Struggling in the latest polls largely due to his responses to the COVID-19 pandemic and the Floyd protests, Trump promotes former deputy campaign manager Bill Stepien to campaign manager, replacing Brad Parscale.
- July 19: Kanye West holds his inaugural rally in North Charleston, South Carolina.
- July 23: Trump and the Republican National Committee cancel the 2020 Republican National Convention events scheduled for August 25 to 27 at the VyStar Veterans Memorial Arena in Jacksonville, Florida, citing the spike in COVID-19 cases in Florida. The events scheduled for August 24 in Charlotte, North Carolina, primarily consisting of the official convention business, will still go on as planned.
- July 27:
  - The Hill publishes a report about how both the Biden and Trump campaigns are each assembling armies of lawyers and building legal war chests should the election become contested.
  - Due to COVID-19 concerns, the first presidential debate on September 29 is moved from the University of Notre Dame in Notre Dame, Indiana, to Case Western Reserve University in Cleveland, Ohio.
- July 28:
  - The Campaign Legal Center, a nonpartisan campaign finance watchdog organization, files a complaint with the Federal Election Commission alleging that the Trump campaign laundered at least $170 million in campaign spending.
  - Politico publishes then later retracts a report claiming that Biden will announce on August 1 that Kamala Harris will be his vice-presidential running mate. The publication states that the piece was merely placeholder text that was inadvertently published.
- July 30:
  - With many states pushing for mail-in voting due to the COVID-19 pandemic, Trump suggests delaying the election on grounds of the reliability problems with postal voting, claiming that there will be extensive voting fraud. Experts have argued that, for the election to be legally delayed, such a decision must be taken by the Congress.
  - The Trump campaign temporarily suspends TV advertising pending "a review and fine-tuning of the campaign's strategy". The move comes after the July 15 replacement of Parscale with Stepien as campaign manager, and with Biden still leading in the polls.
- July 31:
  - The Jorgensen/Cohen campaign launches a nationwide "Brake the Bus Tour".

== August 2020 ==
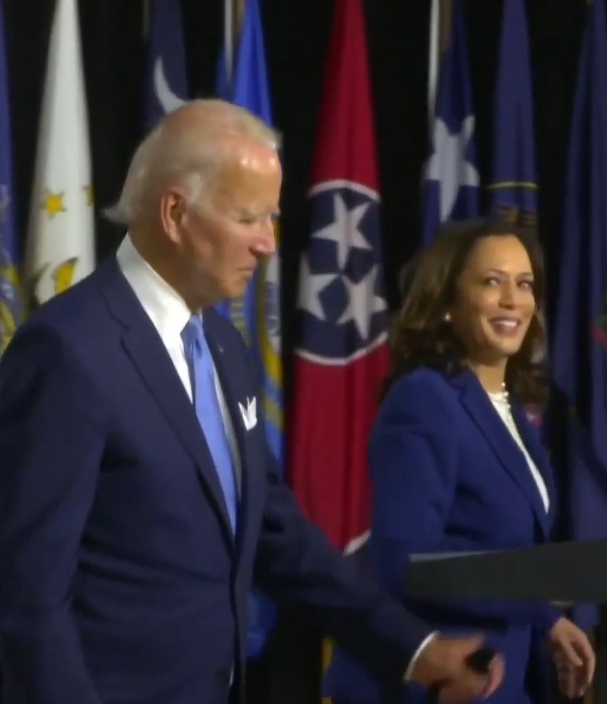
Biden and Harris at their first campaign event since the announcement of her selection as his running mate, August 12, 2020

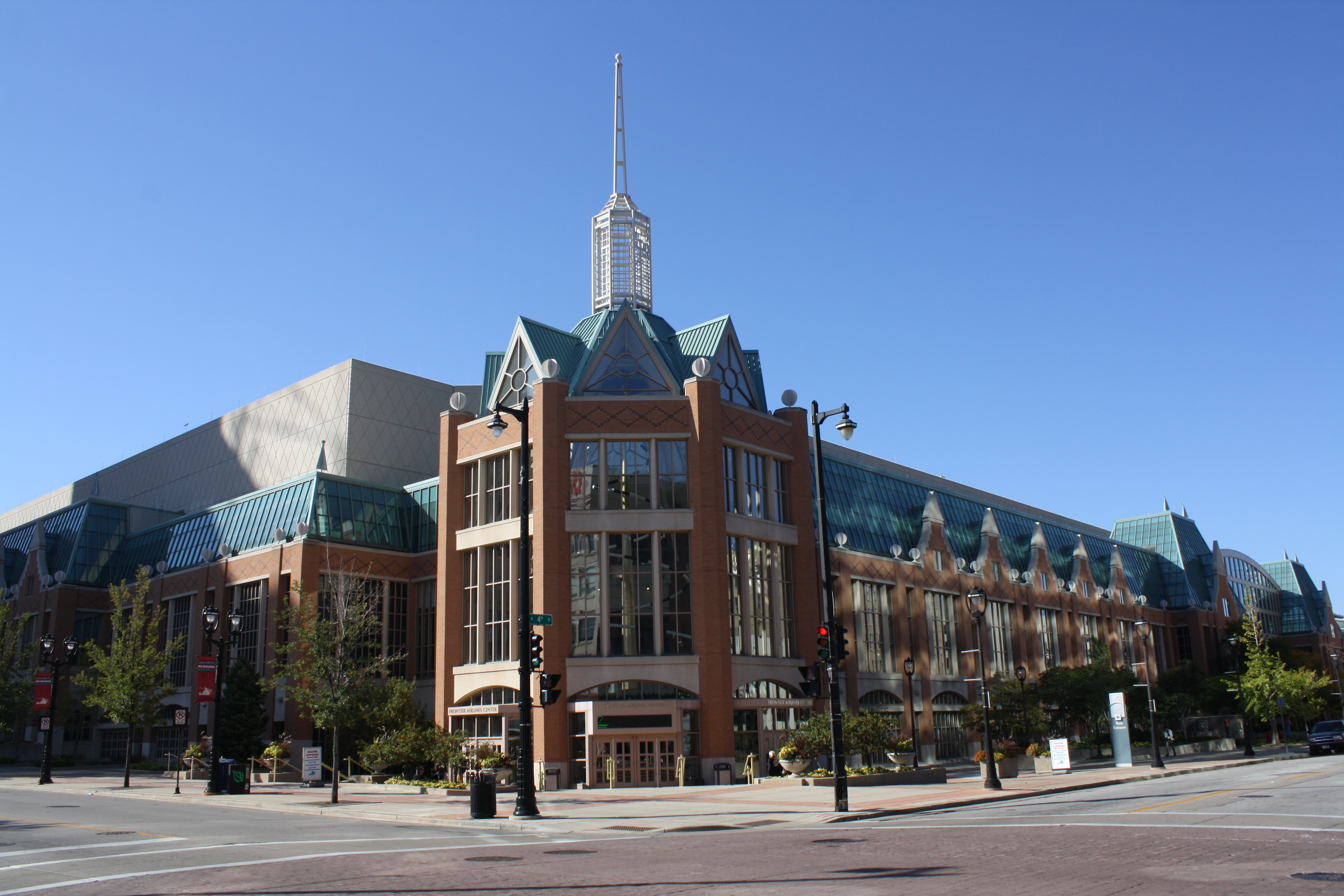
The Wisconsin Center in Milwaukee, Wisconsin, the official site of the Democratic National Convention

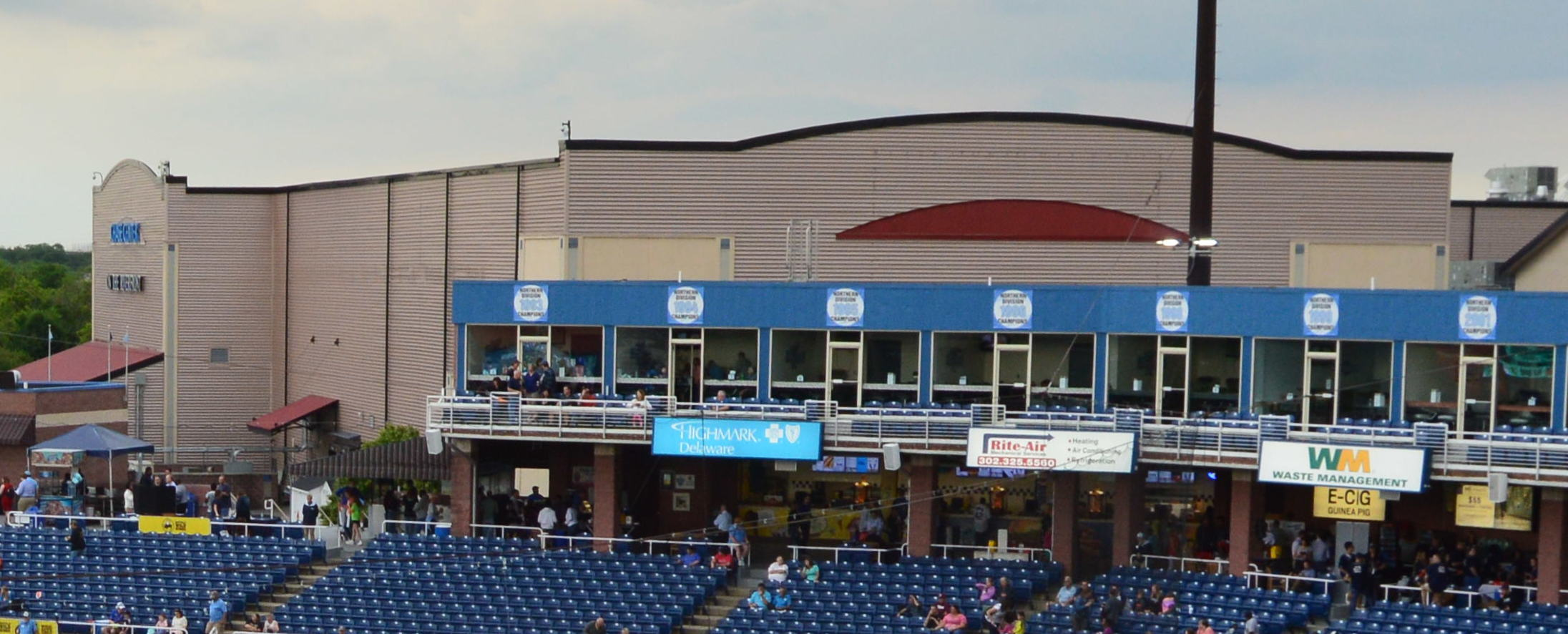
The Chase Center on the Riverfront (background) in Wilmington, Delaware, the site where Biden and Harris made their respective acceptance speeches

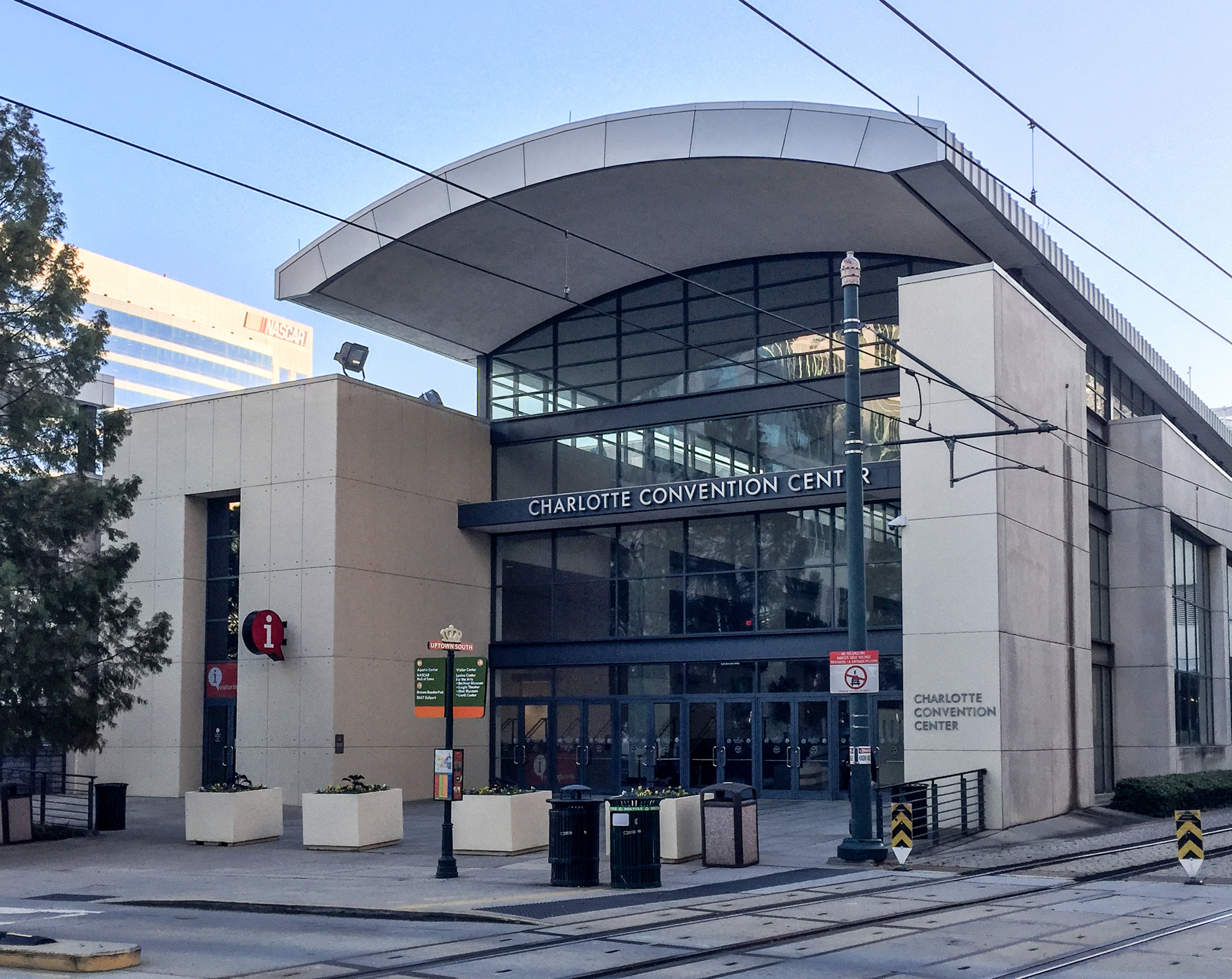
The Charlotte Convention Center in Charlotte, North Carolina, the site of official business of the Republican National Convention

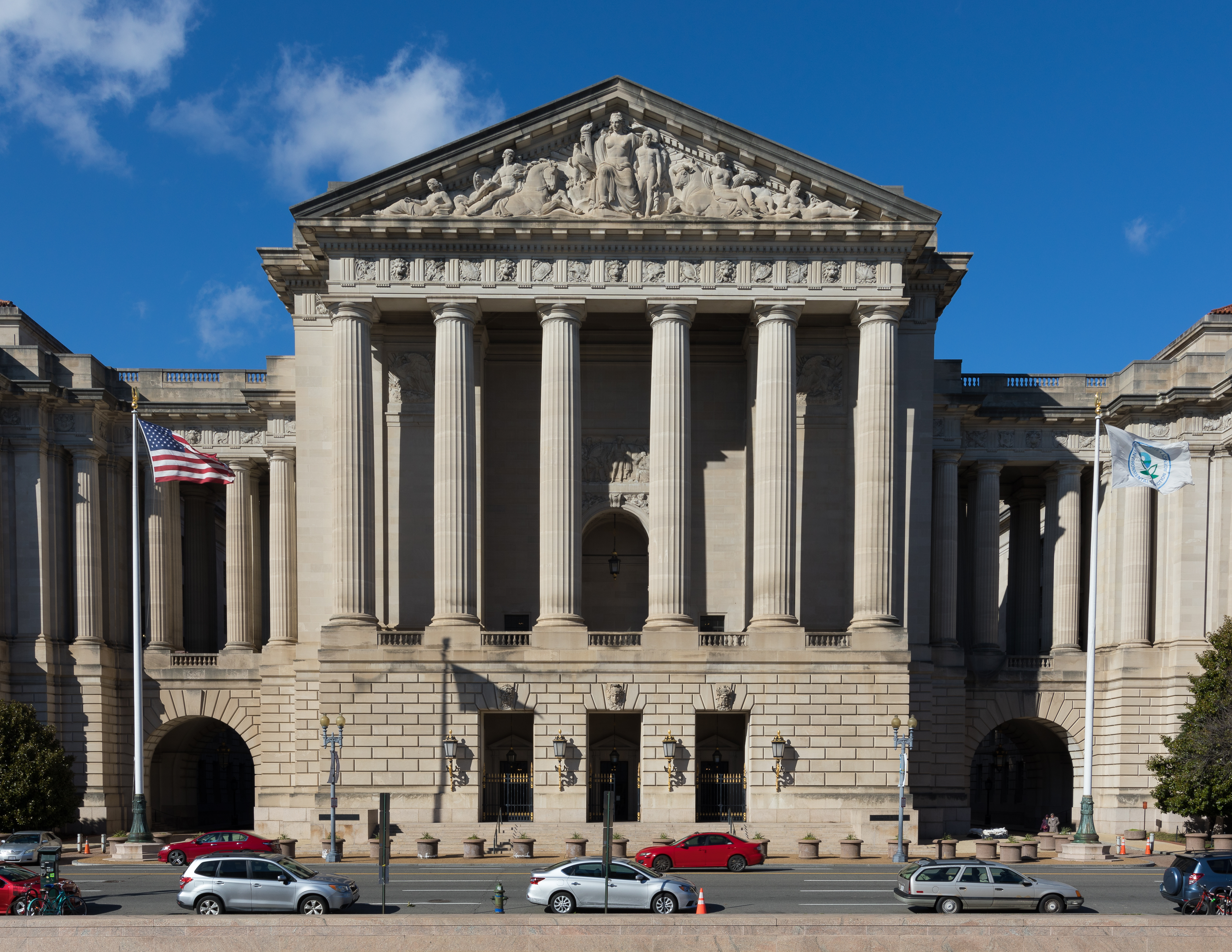
The Andrew W. Mellon Auditorium in Washington, D.C., the primary venue of the nightly events of the Republican National Convention

A stage being assembled in front of the southern side of the White House on August 23, where Trump would make his acceptance speech four days later

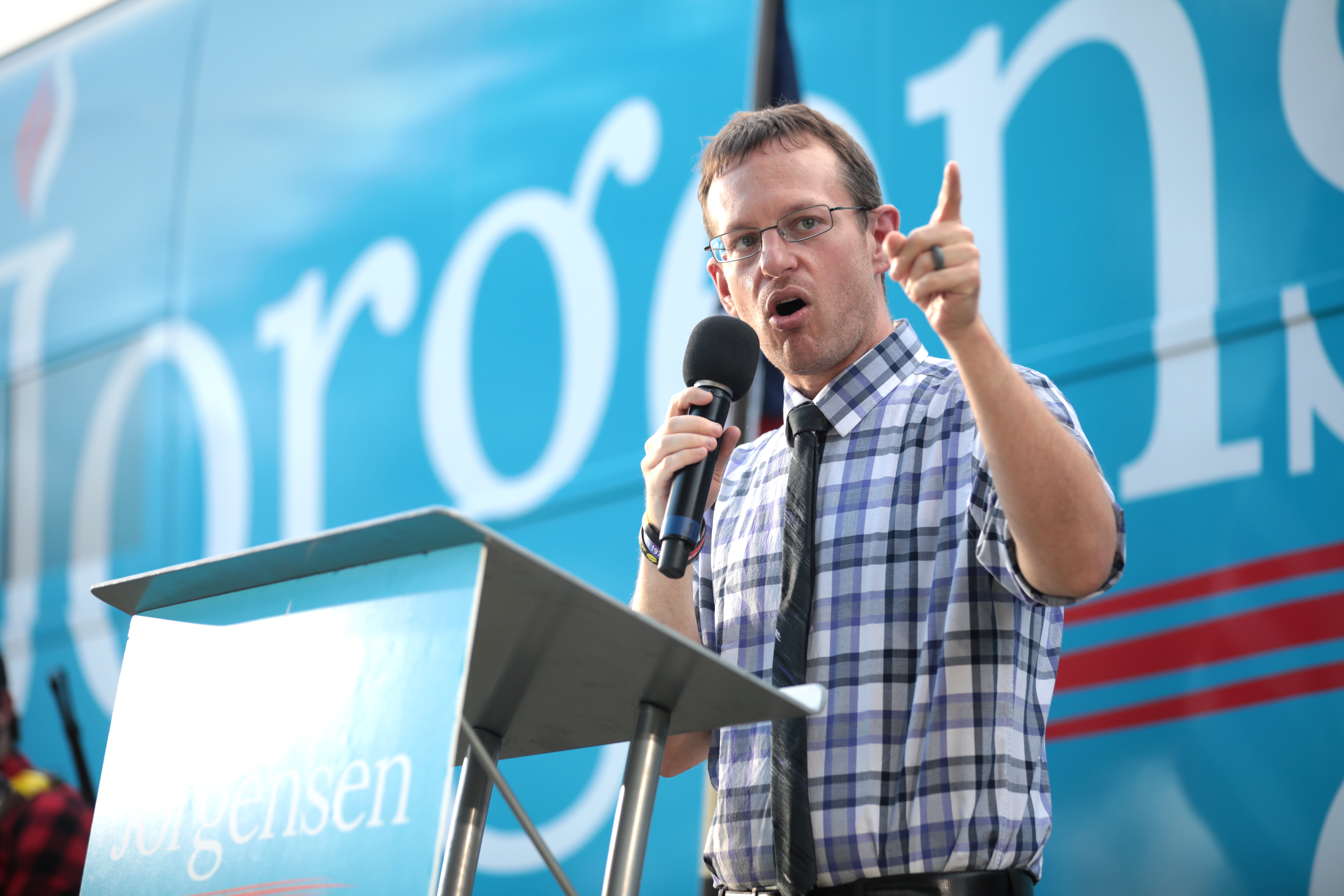
Spike Cohen speaking at a campaign event in Tempe, Arizona, August 28, 2020

- August 1:
  - Although Biden had previously announced that he planned to decide his vice presidential candidate during the first week of August, various media outlets report that he might delay it until the week of August 10.
  - The Republican National Committee announces that the Republican Convention in late August in Charlotte will be closed to the press, citing the social distancing rules imposed by the North Carolina government due to the COVID-19 pandemic. Associated Press writer Zeke Miller, in his capacity as the head of the White House Correspondents' Association, called this move as an "ill-advised decision".
- August 3: Manhattan district attorney Cyrus Vance Jr. submits a new federal court filing under the parameters set forth by the U.S. Supreme Court's July 9 ruling in Trump v. Vance. In addition to urging the federal court to toss out Trump's new legal efforts to prevent the release of his tax returns, Vance also argues that Trump could be investigated for possible insurance and bank fraud.
- August 3–15: Delegates to the 2020 Democratic National Convention conduct official convention business virtually, primarily online voting of both the party's platform and the formal presidential nomination. They officially choose Biden for their presidential nominee.
- August 5:
  - The Nation publishes a piece by James Zogby, a former member of the Executive Committee of the Democratic National Committee, who reports that a majority of Sanders delegates "felt left out" during the planning of the virtual events of Democratic National Convention, and that the process was "lacking in transparency and input".
  - The Trump campaign files a lawsuit to stop Nevada from its plan to conduct the November election almost entirely by mail-in voting, claiming, among others, the vote counting will be delayed beyond a reasonable time frame.
  - Biden announces that he will participate remotely in the Democratic National Convention instead of traveling in person to Milwaukee.
  - Trump announces that he will participate remotely in the Republican National Convention instead of traveling in person to Charlotte. He also suggests that he will make his nomination acceptance speech at the White House for security reasons. Senate Republican whip John Thune questions whether making this particular speech at the White House is still legal under the Hatch Act of 1939, which prohibits employees in the executive branch from engaging in some forms of political activity. Pelosi also criticizes, saying that it would "degrade" the White House.
- August 6:
  - New York State attorney general Letitia James files a civil lawsuit against the National Rifle Association of America alleging fraud, financial misconduct, and misuse of charitable funds by its CEO Wayne LaPierre and some of its other executives. Washington, D.C., attorney general Karl Racine also files a similar lawsuit. With the lawsuits calling for the dissolution of the NRA, some Democratic strategists fear that this could energize Trump supporters, particularly in the battleground states.
  - A New York judge denies Trump's bid to delay a defamation suit filed by journalist E. Jean Carroll, who alleges that Trump sexually assaulted her in the mid-1990s.
- August 7: Over 300 convention delegates sign a statement urging Biden to select House representative Karen Bass of California "to help unify our party and move our nation forward".
- August 10: In an op-ed piece published by the San Francisco Examiner, former San Francisco mayor Willie Brown advises Kamala Harris to decline any offer to be Biden's vice presidential pick, arguing that "historically, the vice presidency has often ended up being a dead end" and that she would be more effective becoming U.S. Attorney General.
- August 11:
  - Biden officially selects Senator Kamala Harris as his vice presidential running mate.
  - The Connecticut primaries, the last of these races delayed due to the COVID-19 pandemic, are held, marking the first time that the presidential primary season extended into August. With delegates to the Democratic National Convention already conducting official convention business virtually since August 3, and the Republican National Convention two weeks away, they essentially become pro forma races. Trump still wins the state's Republican primary and Biden wins the state's Democratic Primary.
- August 12: Biden and Harris make their first official appearance as the presumptive Democratic ticket at Alexis I. duPont High School in Wilmington, Delaware.
- August 13: The House of Representatives votes for an emergency grant of $25 billion to the post office to facilitate the predicted flood of mail ballots. Trump concedes that the post office would need additional funds to handle the additional mail-in voting, but said he would block any additional funding for the post office because he wanted to prevent any increase in balloting by mail.
- August 17: The first night of the 2020 Democratic National Convention is held, with the theme "We the People". Although officially centered at Wisconsin Center in Milwaukee, Wisconsin, each night of the convention consists of two hours each night of a mix of pre-recorded segments and live broadcasts from sites across the country. The Wisconsin Center is still used for the convention's broadcast and production, but the emcees host each night from Los Angeles. This first night is highlighted by speeches by governor Andrew Cuomo of New York, governor Gretchen Whitmer of Michigan, former governor John Kasich of Ohio, Sanders, and former first lady Michelle Obama.
- August 18:
  - The Senate Intelligence Committee, after three years, finally issues its report on Russian interference in the 2016 election. The report does find that then-Trump campaign head Paul Manafort shared polling data with Russian/Ukrainian political operative Konstantin Kilimnik. The committee also concludes that it "found absolutely no evidence that then-candidate Donald Trump or his campaign colluded with the Russian government to meddle in the 2016 election".
  - New Jersey becomes the second state after Nevada on August 5 to be sued by the Trump campaign for its plans to only use mail-in voting.
  - With at least 21 states threatening to sue the postal service regarding potential widespread delays in mail-in-voting, DeJoy announces that he would roll back his cost-cutting changes until after the November election. This includes reinstating overtime hours, rolling back service reductions, and halting the removal of mail-sorting machines and collection boxes. However, 95 percent of the mail sorting machines that were planned for removal have already been removed, and according to Pelosi, DeJoy states that he has no intention of replacing them.
  - Based in their online voting during the past weeks, Democratic convention delegates officially adopt the Democratic Party's 2020 platform, consisting of hundreds of liberal policy proposals initially drafted by a joint Biden/Sanders task force, considered the most progressive for any major political party in U.S. history.
  - The second night of the Democratic National Convention, with the theme "Leadership Matters", is highlighted by the formal roll call of states, with Biden officially winning the nomination with 3,558 delegate votes versus Sanders' 1,151, 5 Abstains, and 35 delegates who did not vote. Speakers include senate minority leader Chuck Schumer, former president Bill Clinton, former secretaries of state John Kerry and Colin Powell, and a speech made by Jill Biden from Brandywine High School in Wilmington, Delaware where she had been an English teacher from 1991 to 1993.
- August 19: The third night of the Democratic National Convention, with the theme "A More Perfect Union", is highlighted by speeches by former secretary of state Hillary Clinton, Pelosi, Warren, and former president Barack Obama. Harris makes her acceptance speech from the Chase Center on the Riverfront in Wilmington, Delaware.
- August 20:
  - Former White House chief strategist Steve Bannon, U.S. Air Force veteran Brian Kolfage, and two others are charged for conspiring to commit wire fraud, money laundering, and defrauding hundreds of thousands of donors though their We Build the Wall fundraising campaign.
  - The fourth and final night of the Democratic National Convention, with the theme "America's Promise", is highlighted by speeches by Buttigieg and Bloomberg. Biden makes his acceptance speech from the Chase Center on the Riverfront in Wilmington, Delaware.
- August 21: DeJoy testifies before the Senate Committee on Homeland Security and Governmental Affairs regarding his recent cost-cutting changes and subsequent August 18 rollbacks, promising that the Postal Service would fulfill its "sacred duty" to deliver election mail in November.
- August 21–23: The Republican National Committee business meeting, to be held in Charlotte, North Carolina.
- August 23–24: Twenty-nine year old African-American Jacob Blake is shot seven times by Kenosha, Wisconsin police, paralyzing him from the waist down, sparking protests in the city and across the country throughout the night and into the early morning of August 24 (Eastern Time).
- August 24:
  - DeJoy and US Postal Service Board of Governors chairman Robert M. Duncan testify before the House Oversight Committee regarding the Postal Service crisis.
  - The first day of the 2020 Republican National Convention is held. Only the official convention business is conducted on the first day at the Charlotte Convention Center in Charlotte, North Carolina, while the four nights consist of entertainment events anchored at the Andrew W. Mellon Auditorium in Washington, D.C., with various other events taking place in that city and elsewhere across the country. The morning session in Charlotte is highlighted by 336 delegates (six from each state) participating in-person to formally nominate Trump and Pence. Midway through the roll-call, Trump addresses the crowd in-person, having flown in to Charlotte. The night events, under the theme, "Land of Heroes", is then highlighted by speeches by Trump campaign official Kimberly Guilfoyle, Donald Trump Jr., former South Carolina Governor Nikki Haley, and Senator Tim Scott of South Carolina.
- August 25:
  - The second night of the Republican National Convention, with the theme "Land of Promise", features a speech by First Lady Melania Trump from the White House. Secretary of State Mike Pompeo appears remotely from the King David Hotel in Jerusalem, while still on a diplomatic trip, causing the House Foreign Affairs Subcommittee on Oversight and Investigations under Democrat Joaquin Castro of Texas to open an investigation as to whether Pompeo also violated the Hatch Act. Mary Ann Mendoza, the mother of police officer Brandon Mendoza who was killed in 2014 by an illegal immigrant, was scheduled to speak, but her appearance is canceled after she posts a tweet in support of an anti-semitic conspiracy theory.
  - During his network's coverage of the Republican National Convention, CNN commentator Don Lemon opines on air to his colleague Chris Cuomo that Biden needs to start addressing the Kenosha protests instead of saying silent, noting that it is becoming a top issue in recent polls and accusing Democrats of "ignoring this problem or hoping that it will go away". Biden eventually starts to address the protests the following afternoon in a tweet, calling for an end to the violence.
- August 26:
  - The results of a CNBC/Change Research poll taken in the days immediately following the Democratic National Convention are released, indicating that it is unclear whether Biden actually received a convention bounce, and that the race has instead tightened in the swing states. A Reuters/Ipsos poll also indicates no convention bounce for Biden.
  - The third night of the Republican National Convention, with the theme "Land of Opportunity", features Pence's acceptance speech from Fort McHenry in Baltimore. Former football star Jack Brewer also makes a speech despite being accused of insider trading.
- August 27:
  - Pelosi urges Biden to skip the presidential debates, claiming that Trump will "probably act in a way that is beneath the dignity of the presidency ... [and] belittle what the debates are supposed to be about". Biden responds by saying that he wants to go ahead and participate so that he can "be a fact-checker on the floor while I'm debating [Trump]".
  - The fourth and final night of the Republican National Convention, with the theme "Land of Greatness", features Trump's acceptance speech from the White House.
- August 28:
  - The House Foreign Affairs Committee announces contempt proceedings against Pompeo for his "ongoing refusal to comply" with congressional subpoenas and "his transparently political misuse of Department resources" dating back to at least the Trump impeachment inquiry.
  - Trump holds a rally in Londonderry, New Hampshire.
- August 29: During the Floyd protests in Portland, Oregon, clashes erupt between Trump supporters and Black Lives Matter protesters. A member of the right-wing Patriot Prayer group, later identified as Aaron Danielson, ends up being shot and killed, and several others arrested.
- August 31:
  - The results of an Emerson College poll taken in the days following the Republican National Convention are released, indicating Biden's lead over Trump has decreased to just within the margin of error.
  - In its en banc hearing, the entire D.C. Circuit Court of Appeals rules to overturn the court's three-member panel's previous June 24 decision, rejecting Flynn's request to dismiss the charges against him in United States v. Flynn.
  - Biden and Trump publicly accuse each over the recent violence during the Floyd protests in Portland, Oregon, with, among other traded barbs, Trump claiming that Biden "is unwilling to lead", and Biden claiming Trump is "rooting for chaos and violence".

== September 2020 ==
- September 1:
  - Trump tours the damaged sites of the Kenosha protests, meeting with owners of damaged businesses and participating in a round table discussion on community safety. Wisconsin governor Tony Evers, Kenosha Mayor John Antaramian, and the city's NAACP branch president had discouraged the trip, each respectively stating that his presence would only hinder efforts to "overcome division", the trip was "ill advised", and it would "only inflame tensions".
  - In an interview published by Axios, the Democratic data and analytics firm Hawkfish warns that mail-in voting will likely delay the actual election results by days or even weeks. The firm states that if significantly more Biden supporters vote by mail than Trump supporters due to COVID-19 or other concerns, then any results reported on just election night may falsely skew towards a potential Trump landslide victory.
  - In the second round of Trump v. Vance, a panel of the Second U.S. Circuit Court of Appeals grants Trump's request to delay Manhattan district attorney Vance from accessing his tax returns. Oral arguments in the case were also delayed to September 25.
- September 2: The results of a CNN poll taken from August 28 to September 1 are released, indicating no convention bounce for Trump.
- September 3:
  - Citing four anonymous sources, The Atlantic publishes an article by its editor-in-chief Jeffrey Goldberg claiming that Trump did not want to visit France's Aisne-Marne American Cemetery and Memorial in 2018 to honor U.S. troops buried there because he through they were "losers" and "suckers". Trump denies these allegations, saying, "It is a disgraceful situation by a magazine that's a terrible magazine." Various former and current White House officials also deny Trump ever said those comments.
  - Biden visits the sites of the Kenosha protests, against the wishes of the local NAACP president and Kenosha County Executive. During this first campaign visit to Wisconsin, Biden meets with Jacob Blake's family and holds a community meeting.
  - Trump holds a rally in Latrobe, Pennsylvania.
  - Jorgensen postpones campaign stops until the following week due to the death of her mother.
- September 4:
  - Various North Carolina counties start to mail out absentee ballots to voters, arguably marking the official start of the general election despite early voting in the state not officially beginning for another six weeks.
  - During a speech in Wilmington, Delaware, Biden blames Trump for the economic effects of the COVID-19 pandemic, stating that it has widened the divisions between the rich and the poor.
- September 7: Biden visits the Pennsylvania branch of the AFL–CIO in Harrisburg, Pennsylvania, participating in a Labor Day virtual town hall with labor leaders across the country.
- September 8:
  - The Justice Department asks to take over Trump's defense in Carroll's defamation lawsuit against him, on grounds that his comments that caused her to file the lawsuit came while he was in office.
  - Trump holds a rally in Winston-Salem, North Carolina.
- September 9:
  - Biden makes a campaign stop in Warren, Michigan, addressing jobs.
  - Promoting his forthcoming book Rage, scheduled for release on September 15, journalist and author Bob Woodward claims that Trump admitted to him in early February 2020 that he was repeatedly playing down the COVID-19 virus even though he knew it was deadlier than the flu. Trump responds by calling Woodward's book "a political hit job" and that "I don't want people to be frightened, I don't want to create panic". Various commentators also criticize Woodward for deliberately withholding this revelation for months just for his book, or for "October surprise"-like timing purposes, instead of thinking about the public health.
- September 10:
  - The Wisconsin Supreme Court issues an order to halt the mailing of the state's absentee ballots to Wisconsin voters, pending a lawsuit filed by the Hawkins/Walker campaign after the Wisconsin Elections Commission decided to not include the Green Party ticket on the ballot because Walker provided different addresses on her campaign filings.
  - In a similar case involving improperly submitted paperwork by the Green Party campaign, a Pennsylvania appellate court orders that Hawkins can appear on that state's ballot, but Walker's name cannot be listed.
  - Trump holds a rally in Freeland, Michigan.
- September 11: Observing the 19th anniversary of the September 11 attacks, both Biden and Pence attend the morning ceremony at the National September 11 Memorial & Museum in New York City and exchange elbow bumps, while Trump attends one at the Flight 93 National Memorial in Somerset County, Pennsylvania. Biden later makes a separate visit to the Flight 93 Memorial in the afternoon. Harris meanwhile attends a memorial ceremony in Fairfax, Virginia.
- September 12: After canceling a rally at Reno–Tahoe International Airport in Reno, Nevada due to the airport's COVID-19 health guidelines, Trump instead holds one at Minden–Tahoe Airport in Minden, Nevada.
- September 13: Trump holds his first indoor rally in nearly three months in Henderson, Nevada, despite the local COVID-19 health orders limiting such indoor events.
- September 14:
  - Trump visits McClellan Park, California to meet with local officials on the California wildfires, then travels to Phoenix, Arizona to meet with Latino supporters.
  - During a speech in Wilmington, Delaware, Biden addresses the wildfires, calling Trump a "climate arsonist" for the President's lack of climate change policies.
  - The House Select Subcommittee on the Coronavirus Crisis launches an investigation on allegations that Trump appointees pressured CDC officials to change or delay COVID-19 reports.
- September 15:
  - Trump participates in a town hall hosted by ABC News in Philadelphia, Pennsylvania.
  - Biden makes campaign stops in Tampa and Kissimmee, Florida, courting Latino voters as recent polls show that both he and Trump are about evenly divided among the Latino community in the battleground state.
- September 16: During a speech in Wilmington, Delaware, Biden criticizes Trump for attempting to rush a COVID-19 vaccine before the election.
- September 17:
  - U.S. District Judge Stanley Bastian issues a nationwide preliminary injunction blocking the Postal Service from implementing Postmaster General DeJoy's changes, calling them "a politically motivated attack on the efficiency of the postal service".
  - The Pennsylvania Supreme Court extends the state's mail-in ballot deadline to November 6, three days after the election.
  - Trump rally in Mosinee, Wisconsin.
  - Biden participates in a town hall hosted by CNN in Scranton, Pennsylvania.
- September 18:
  - Supreme Court justice Ruth Bader Ginsburg dies. Senate Majority Leader Mitch McConnell states that he intends to fill the vacancy as soon as possible once Trump names a nominee. Biden and other Democrats call to leave the seat open until after Inauguration Day.
  - Trump rally in Bemidji, Minnesota. He is not informed of Ginsburg's death until after the event.
  - A Michigan court extends the state's absentee ballot deadline to November 17, two weeks after the election.
- September 19: Trump rally in Fayetteville, North Carolina. Trump calls Biden the "dumbest of all candidates ... You can't have this guy as your president ... maybe I'll sign an executive order that you cannot have him as your president".
- September 20: Early voting begins in several states, roughly 45 days before the election.
- September 21:
  - Biden campaigns in Manitowoc, Wisconsin, the second time he has visited the state in two weeks.
  - Trump rally in Swanton, Ohio.
- September 22:
  - A decision by the Maine Supreme Court effectively allows the state to proceed with implementing the first-ever use of ranked-choice voting in a presidential general election. Maine's high court rejects the Maine Republican Party's attempt to put a referendum on the ranked-choice voting plan on the statewide ballot, ruling that they failed to gather enough petition signatures for the measure to qualify because roughly 1,000 of them were invalid.
  - Trump rally at Pittsburgh International Airport in Moon Township, Pennsylvania.
- September 23:
  - The Senate committees on Homeland Security and Finance jointly release an interim report on the Bidens' business dealings with Burisma Holdings, which was at the center of the Trump–Ukraine scandal and the subsequent impeachment of Trump. The investigation finds no evidence of wrongdoing by Biden. The report does however find that his son Hunter's role at the company was "awkward", "problematic" and gave the appearance of a conflict of interest when he benefited from using his father's name.
  - Biden participates in a Black economic summit in Charlotte.
  - Trump speaks at the National Catholic Prayer Breakfast.
  - When asked during a press conference, Trump declines to commit to a peaceful transfer of power after the election, saying "We're going to have to see what happens. You know that I've been complaining very strongly about the ballots, and the ballots are a disaster."
  - A Kentucky grand jury decides to indict only one of the three Louisville Metro Police officers involved in the shooting of Breonna Taylor, sparking protests across the county. Two Louisville police officers are shot during the protests.
- September 24:
  - The Senate unanimously passes a resolution authored by Democratic senator Joe Manchin of West Virginia reaffirming support for a peaceful transfer of power, one day after Trump refused to commit to one.
  - FBI Director Christopher A. Wray testifies before the Senate Homeland Security Committee that "We have not seen historically any kind of coordinated national voter fraud effort in a major election, whether it's by mail or otherwise".
  - Biden halts further public campaign appearances to prepare for the September 29 presidential debate. Trump mocks Biden for doing so when contrasting it to his own campaign schedule for the upcoming weekend.
  - Trump rally in Jacksonville, Florida.
- September 25: Trump hosts Latino supporters at his Doral Miami Resort near Miami in the morning, attends a Black economic empowerment event in Atlanta in the afternoon, then holds an evening rally in Newport News, Virginia despite the Virginia COVID-19 health orders limiting such indoor events.
- September 26:
  - Trump nominates federal circuit judge Amy Coney Barrett to succeed Ginsburg on the Supreme Court. At least eight attendees at the nomination ceremony at the White House Rose Garden would later test positive for COVID-19 in the coming weeks.
  - Trump rally at Harrisburg International Airport in Middletown, Pennsylvania.
- September 27:
  - The New York Times publishes a report stating that it has obtained at least two decades worth of tax return data for Trump, showing that he "paid no income taxes at all in 10 of the previous 15 years — largely because he reported losing much more money than he made" and that Trump engaged in "a decade-long audit battle with the Internal Revenue Service over the legitimacy of a $72.9 million tax refund that he claimed, and received, after declaring huge losses". Trump calls the Times story "fake news".
  - A federal appeals court temporarily halts Wisconsin's six-day absentee ballot extension pending further action by the Seventh Circuit Court of Appeal.
  - The Trump campaign sues the North Carolina State Board of Elections over its new guidelines that allows North Carolina voters with mail-in ballots with deficient information to fix them without getting a new blank ballot.
  - Brad Parscale, a senior adviser to the Trump campaign, is hospitalized after his wife calls Fort Lauderdale, Florida police that he had guns and he was threatening to harm himself. Officers seize 10 firearms from the home and report that Parscale's wife had cuts and bruises on her arms and face, which she said Parscale had inflicted earlier in the week.
- September 29:
  - A three-judge panel on the Seventh Circuit Court of Appeal upholds Wisconsin's six-day absentee ballot extension.
  - During a hearing in United States v. Flynn, Flynn's attorney Sidney Powell acknowledges that she had "a number of discussions with the President" about the case and had asked him not to pardon Flynn.
  - The first presidential debate sponsored by the Commission on Presidential Debates (CPD) is held at the Case Western Reserve University in Cleveland, Ohio. At least 11 individuals involved in preparation for this event would later test positive for COVID-19. Despite earlier claims that all participants would be tested, Trump and his personnel arrive too late to be tested and are instead admitted under "an honor system".
- September 30:
  - A Republican-led committee in the Pennsylvania House of Representatives votes to create a new special committee to investigate Trump's election fraud allegations. Opposed by Pennsylvania Democrats, this new proposed panel would have the power to subpoena state election officials and USPS workers while both the election and the vote counting are already in progress.
  - Following the chaotic exchanges between Biden and Trump during the previous evening's debate, the CPD issues a statement saying that "additional structure should be added to the format of the remaining debates to ensure a more orderly discussion of the issues".
  - Testifying before the Senate Judiciary Committee, former FBI director James Comey defends his role in the Russia investigations and Crossfire Hurricane.
  - Parscale steps down from the Trump campaign claiming that he is under "overwhelming stress", while his wife now claims that the apparent domestic abuse on September 27 was "misconstrued".
  - Biden embarks on a six-city campaign train tour through eastern Ohio and western Pennsylvania.
  - Trump rally in Duluth, Minnesota.
  - Trump adviser Hope Hicks and RNC chairwoman Ronna McDaniel both test positive for COVID-19 but do not announce it publicly until the following days.

== October 2020 ==
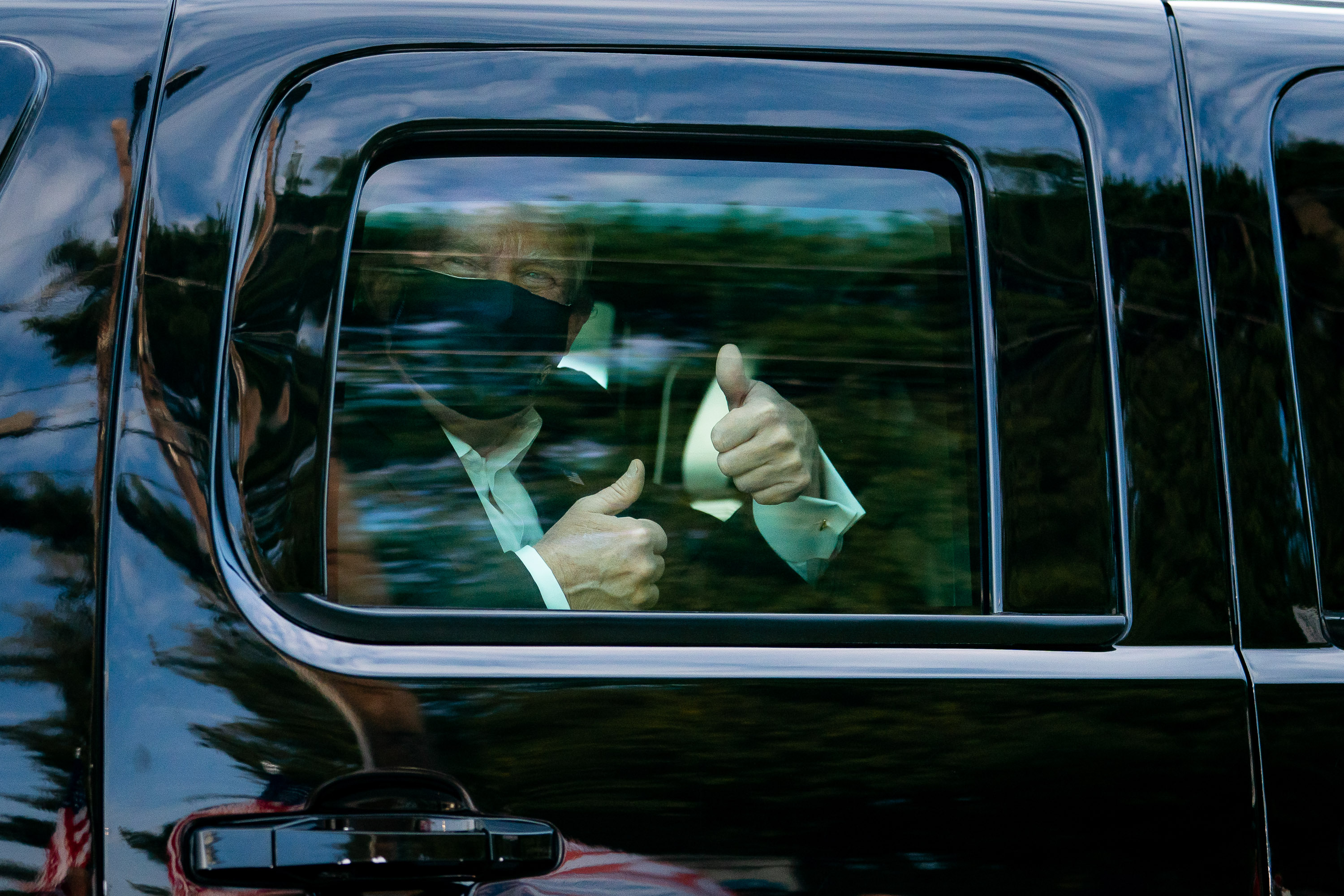
Trump greeting supporters during a drive outside Walter Reed National Military Medical Center, October 4, 2020

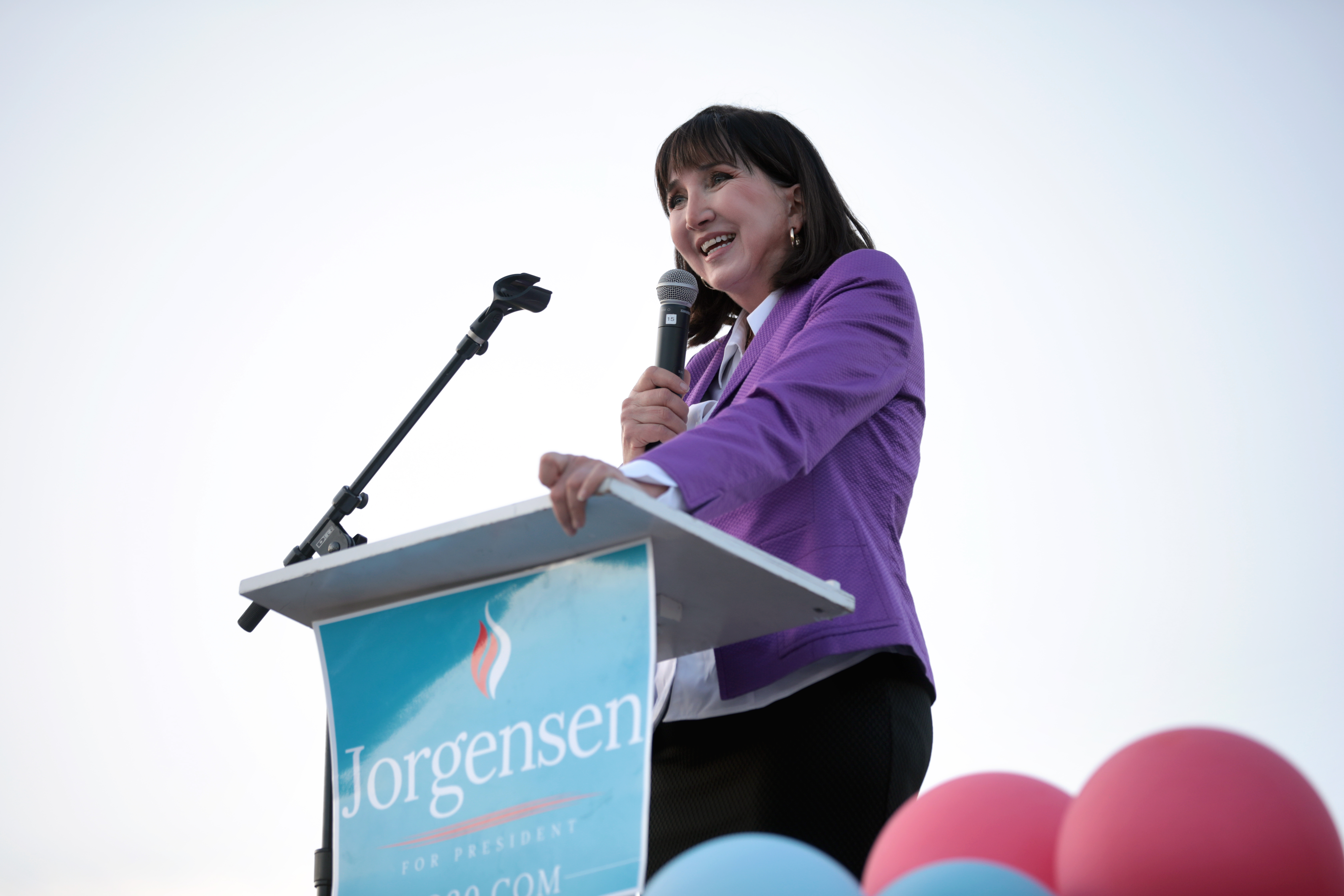
Jo Jorgensen speaking at a rally in Scottsdale, Arizona, October 10, 2020

- October 1:
  - Biden hosts a virtual fundraiser.
  - Trump attends a fundraiser at the Trump National Golf Club Bedminster in Bedminster, New Jersey. A small group of White House leaders privately learn about Hicks' positive COVID-19 test as Marine One was just taking off, but they allow the event to go forward anyway.
  - Both Biden and Trump make separate virtual speeches at the Alfred E. Smith Memorial Foundation Dinner.
- October 1–2: Trump and first lady Melania test positive for COVID-19, publicly revealing their diagnosis after midnight October 2. The tests are administered to the President and First Lady after Hicks publicly announces her positive test results during the evening of October 1. White House physician Sean Conley issues a memo on early October 2 morning that the Trumps are "both well" as they begin the quarantine process, and expects Trump to "continue carrying out his duties without disruption while recovering".
- October 2:
  - After experiencing mild symptoms of COVID-19, Trump is admitted into the Walter Reed National Military Medical Center in Bethesda, Maryland, "out of an abundance of caution".
  - The City of Cleveland announces that 11 individuals who were involved with the preparations for the September 29 presidential debate have tested positive for COVID-19.
  - Biden tests negative for COVID-19, then holds a campaign event in Grand Rapids, Michigan.
  - The Commission on Presidential Debates says that the vice presidential debate set for October 7 remains on schedule after Pence and second lady Karen also test negative for COVID-19. The CPD however remains silent as to whether Trump's COVID-19 diagnosis will affect the second presidential debate scheduled for October 15.
  - Several people who attended Barrett's Supreme Court nomination ceremony on September 26 also announce that they have tested positive for COVID-19, including senators Mike Lee of Utah and Thom Tillis of North Carolina, University of Notre Dame president John I. Jenkins, and former Counselor to the President Kellyanne Conway.
  - Barrett tests negative for COVID-19, and Republican senators say that her confirmation hearings will still go on as scheduled on October 12. Democrats urge the hearings to be delayed because of the outbreak, especially since Lee and Tillis sit on the Senate Judiciary Committee.
- October 3: During a virtual campaign event, Biden admits that he has advised some governors to not publicly endorse him, fearing that the Trump administration would retaliate by withholding federal resources to their respective states.
- October 4: Trump briefly leaves Walter Reed to drive past by supporters gathering outside the hospital, waving at them from the back seat of an SUV. Although all Secret Service agents inside the vehicle with Trump wore personal protective equipment, some agents within the Secret Service anonymously complain about his behavior to The Washington Post.
- October 5:
  - Trump is discharged from Walter Reed and returns to the White House. Doctors say in a news briefing that Trump will be continued to be treated with dexamethasone and remdesivir during his recovery.
  - Biden campaigns in Miami, including participating in a town hall hosted by MSNBC at the Pérez Art Museum Miami.
  - Due to concerns about COVID-19 outbreak, the CPD approves plans to have Harris and Pence separated by plexiglass during the vice presidential debate.
  - The Supreme Court, starting its 2020 term with eight justices due to Ginsburg's vacancy, grants the South Carolina Republican Party's request to reinstate the state's signature requirement on absentee ballots, pending further appeal by the Democrats.
- October 6:
  - The Supreme Court denies the Maine Republican Party's petition to stop Maine's ranked-choice voting plan.
  - Biden makes a campaign speech in Gettysburg, Pennsylvania.
- October 7:
  - Trump begins attacking US Attorney General William Barr regarding the Department of Justice delaying the release of Durham report until at least after the election, tweeting "Where are all of the arrests? ... Do something about this, the biggest of all political scandals (in history)!!! Biden, Obama and Crooked Hillary led this treasonous plot!!!".
  - In the Trump v. Vance case, the Second Circuit Court of Appeals rejects Trump's latest attempt to block the subpoena for his tax returns. Trump states his intent to appeal this ruling to the Supreme Court, therefore the appeals court grants his legal team 12 days in which to do so before prosecutors may execute the subpoena.
  - The only vice presidential debate sponsored by the Commission on Presidential Debates (CPD), is held at the University of Utah in Salt Lake City, Utah.
- October 8:
  - The Supreme Court denies the Montana Republican Party's petition to stop Montana's plan to send mail-in ballots to every registered voter because of the COVID-19 pandemic.
  - During an interview with Fox Business following the previous night's vice presidential debate, Trump attacks Harris for her stance on open borders, calling her a "monster" and a "communist".
  - Both Biden and Harris attend a campaign event in Phoenix, Arizona to kickoff a campaign bus tour through the state.
  - The FBI arrests 13 armed militia members who plotted to kidnap governor Gretchen Whitmer of Michigan.
  - The Free & Equal Elections Foundation sponsors a presidential debate in Denver, Colorado, inviting any candidate that is on the ballot in at least 10 states, regardless of party.
  - Due to Trump's positive COVID diagnosis, the Commission on Presidential Debates initially announces that the second presidential debate scheduled for October 15 will be held virtually. While Biden agrees to the format change, Trump says he will not take part and would instead hold a rally with his supporters on that day. Biden then agrees to postpone the second debate, and later schedules a town hall to be televised on ABC on October 15. The Trump campaign then asks the Debate Commission to reschedule the second debate to October 22 and postpone the third debate to October 29, while the Biden campaign objects to postponing the third debate to that date.
  - Conley releases a memo saying that Trump's condition is stable, is "devoid of symptoms", and he anticipates that Trump could have a "safe return to public engagements" by October 10. However, later that evening Trump appears on the phone on Hannity and suffers several coughing fits.
- October 9:
  - The Debate Commission decides to cancel the second debate since Trump is unwilling to participate virtually, and that the third debate would go forward as originally scheduled on October 22. The Trump campaign responds by referencing Conley's memo during the previous day regarding Trump's improved condition, and states that there is "no medical reason" to stop the debate from proceeding, in-person, as originally scheduled.
  - Biden speaks at a drive-in campaign event in Las Vegas.
  - In what he claims as the "largest radio rally in history", Trump calls into The Rush Limbaugh Show for two hours.
- October 10:
  - Biden campaigns in Erie, Pennsylvania, focusing on the economy and the impact of the COVID-19 pandemic.
  - Trump addresses supporters at the White House South Lawn, his first public event since being released from Walter Reed.
- October 12
  - The Senate Judiciary Committee hearings on the Amy Coney Barrett Supreme Court nomination begins. As a member of the committee, this pulls Harris off the campaign trail.
  - Biden campaigns in Ohio, stopping in Toledo then going to Cincinnati.
  - Trump holds a rally in Sanford, Florida, his first public campaign event outside of Washington, D.C. since being released from Walter Reed.
- October 13:
  - The Supreme Court issues a stay in Ross v. National Urban League, allowing the Trump administration to end the counting early for the 2020 census by October 15, pending further appeals in the lower courts.
  - In the Trump v. Vance case, Trump's attorneys submit an emergency petition to the Supreme Court to block the latest order from the Second Circuit Court of Appeals to allow the Manhattan District Attorney to get Trump's tax returns.
  - Biden campaigns in South Florida, stopping in Pembroke Pines then going to Miramar.
  - Trump holds a rally in Johnstown, Pennsylvania.
- October 14:
  - Using material provided by Trump's personal lawyer Rudy Giuliani regarding emails allegedly found on a damaged laptop at a Delaware computer repair shop, the New York Post suggests that Biden used his political power to benefit his son Hunter in business dealings with Ukraine. The New York Post article is met with skepticism, with questions about the authenticity and provenance of the emails. The Washington Post then reports that intelligence agencies have been concerned since at least 2019 that Giuliani has been the target of a Russian influence operation. Rather than distance himself from Giuliani, Trump uses the New York Post story as a campaign talking point as if it was true.
  - Trump schedules a town hall to be televised on NBC on October 15, directly competing with Biden's already scheduled town hall on ABC. Top Democrats, media pundits and even some NBC journalists are surprised by NBC agreeing with Trump to go head-to-head with Biden's event.
  - Trump holds a rally in Des Moines, Iowa.
  - Melania Trump reveals on the White House web site that Barron Trump had previously tested positive for COVID-19 about two weeks prior.
- October 15:
  - Trump holds a rally in Greenville, North Carolina.
  - Both Biden and Trump participate in separate town halls, hosted by ABC and NBC, respectively.
- October 16:
  - The FBI begins investigating whether the unverified emails published by the New York Post on October 14, allegedly showing the Bidens' influence in business dealings with Ukraine, were actually part of a foreign disinformation campaign to hurt Biden.
  - Biden campaigns in Southeastern Michigan, stopping in Southfield then going to Detroit.
  - Trump holds rallies in Ocala, Florida and Macon, Georgia.
- October 17:
  - National Woman's March
  - Trump holds rallies in Muskegon, Michigan and Janesville, Wisconsin.
- October 18:
  - Biden campaigns in Durham, North Carolina.
  - Trump holds a rally in Carson City, Nevada.
- October 19:
  - The Supreme Court splits 4–4 on whether to grant an emergency stay on the Pennsylvania Supreme Court's September 17 ruling that extended the state's mail-in ballot deadline to November 6, three days after the election. As a result, the lower court's decision stands.
  - The Debate Commission unanimously adopts new rules for the October 22 debate, adding mute buttons to the candidates' microphones to limit them from interrupting each other like during the September 29 debate. Under these new rules, each candidate's microphone will be turned off during the other's initial two-minute reply to a question. Both microphones will then be turned on during the open discussion periods.
  - While Biden stays home for the next three days to prepare for the October 22 debate, Trump continues to hold rallies, starting with ones in Prescott and Tucson, Arizona.
- October 20:
  - The Fourth Circuit Court of Appeals upholds North Carolina's absentee ballots deadline of November 12.
  - Trump holds a rally in Erie, Pennsylvania.
- October 20–21: Voters in at least three swing states report receiving emails, allegedly from the neo-fascist group "Proud Boys", threatening them unless they vote for Trump. CBS News reports that these emails were actually sent from overseas servers. In an October 21 press conference, Director of National Intelligence John Ratcliffe announces that both Iran and Russia have obtained contact information about voters' registrations in an attempt to influence the election, and that Iran has been sending the spoofed emails "to intimidate voters, incite civil unrest and damage President Trump".
- October 21:
  - The Supreme Court votes 5–3 to grant an emergency stay that reinstates a state-ordered ban on curbside voting in Alabama.
  - Obama holds a drive-in rally for Biden in Philadelphia.
  - Trump holds a rally in Gastonia, North Carolina.
- October 22: The final presidential debate sponsored by the Commission on Presidential Debates (CPD) is held at Belmont University in Nashville, Tennessee.
- October 23: Trump holds rallies in The Villages and Pensacola, Florida.
- October 24:
  - Obama holds a drive-in rally for Biden in Miami.
  - Biden campaigns in Bucks County and Luzerne County, Pennsylvania.
  - Trump holds rallies in Lumberton, North Carolina, Circleville, Ohio, and Waukesha, Wisconsin.
  - Free & Equal Elections Foundation sponsors a presidential debate in Cheyenne, Wyoming.
- October 25:
  - Biden hosts a virtual campaign event and concert featuring performances by several musical artists.
  - Harris campaigns in Detroit.
  - Trump holds a rally in Manchester, New Hampshire.
  - Pence holds a rally in Kinston, North Carolina.
- October 26:
  - Biden defends his limited travel schedule during the final week of the campaign compared to Trump's, saying that he wants to protect himself from catching COVID-19, he is still holding virtual events, and it is best to keep making the election a referendum on Trump's behavior and let the president shoot himself in the foot. A Biden campaign advisor also tells Politico that "the polling in this race has been very stable over time", and that "rallies don't matter much to voters" because they only "excite a base that's already voting for Trump". Democrats remain hopeful that Biden's strategy during these final days of the campaign, relying heavily on expensive TV and media ads instead of in-person campaigning, will pay off.
  - Trump's son-in-law and senior adviser Jared Kushner faces backlash after stating in a Fox & Friends interview that Black Americans have to "want to be successful".
  - Trump holds rallies in Allentown, Lititz and Martinsburg, Pennsylvania.
  - The Supreme Court issues an emergency stay blocking Wisconsin's six-day absentee ballot extension.
  - The Senate votes to confirm Barrett's nomination to the Supreme Court, with all but one Republican voting in favor and all Democrats voting against.
  - Twenty-seven-year old black man Walter Wallace is fatally shot by police in Philadelphia, sparking demonstrations and riots throughout the city.
- October 27:
  - US District Judge Lewis A. Kaplan denies the Justice Department's September 8 request to represent Trump in Carroll's defamation lawsuit against him, stating that Trump's allegedly defamatory statements against Carroll was not made "within the scope of his employment" as president.
  - Biden campaigns in Warm Springs, Georgia, his first campaign visit to that state.
  - Harris campaigns in Reno, Nevada and Las Vegas, Nevada.
  - Trump holds rallies in Lansing, Michigan, West Salem, Wisconsin, and Omaha, Nebraska. Hundreds of people who attended the Omaha rally are left stranded for hours in freezing temperatures after the buses that were shuttling them back to the parking lots slowed down due to the deteriorating weather conditions and the security requirements. About 30 people are given medical attention and six are sent to the hospital.
  - Pence holds rallies in Greenville, South Carolina, Greensboro, North Carolina, and Wilmington, North Carolina.
  - Melania Trump makes her first major solo campaign event in Atglen, Pennsylvania.
- October 27–28: The White House science officer initially sends a press release listing "ending the COVID-19 pandemic" as one of Trump's top accomplishments during his first term. The White House then issues another press release on the following day, saying that the previous release was "poorly worded" and Trump does not actually believe that the pandemic is over.
- October 28:
  - The Supreme Court rejects emergency stay petitions in North Carolina and Pennsylvania, allowing the ballot extensions in those two states to stand.
  - Biden remains in his hometown of Wilmington, Delaware, casting an early ballot.
  - Harris campaigns in Phoenix and Tucson, Arizona.
  - Trump holds rallies in Bullhead City and Goodyear, Arizona. Brexit Party leader Nigel Farage attends Trump's Bullhead City rally.
  - Pence holds a rally in Flint, Michigan.
- October 29:
  - The Eighth Circuit Court of Appeals orders that postmarked Minnesota absentee ballots received after Election Day are to be set aside pending a final decision on whether that should be counted.
  - Biden and Trump hold competing events in Tampa, Florida.
  - Biden also campaigns in Fort Lauderdale, Florida.
  - A Trump rally in Fayetteville, North Carolina is postponed to November 2 due to high winds.
  - Pence campaigns in Des Moines, Iowa.
- October 30:
  - Biden campaigns in Des Moines, Iowa, St. Paul, Minnesota, and Milwaukee, Wisconsin.
  - Harris campaigns in Fort Worth and Houston, Texas, the first time in over 30 years that a Democratic vice presidential candidate visits the state this late before the election.
  - Trump holds rallies in Waterford Township, Michigan, Green Bay, Wisconsin, and Rochester, Minnesota.
  - Pence holds rallies in Tucson and Flagstaff, Arizona.
- October 30–31: While traveling on Interstate 35 from San Antonio to Austin, Texas, a Biden campaign bus is swarmed by a caravan of Texas Trump supporters known as the "Trump Train" group, causing the Biden supporters on board the bus to call 911 to get a police escort and eventually cancel their Austin event. Although no one is hurt, the Biden campaign accuses the Trump Train group of trying to run the bus off the road. On the following day, Trump tweets a video of the caravan surrounding Biden's bus with the caption "I love Texas", causing further criticism by the Biden campaign.
- October 31:
  - A get-out-the-vote rally in Graham, North Carolina is dispersed by police officers using pepper spray.
  - Biden campaigns with Obama in Detroit and Flint, Michigan.
  - Harris campaigns in Miami, Fort Lauderdale, and Lake Worth Beach, Florida.
  - Trump holds rallies in Bucks County, Reading, and Butler, Pennsylvania. For the second time in a week, this time in Butler, hundreds of people who attended the rally are left stranded for hours in freezing temperatures.

== Post-election litigation and presidential transition ==
The election was held on November 3, followed by a period of election litigation and attempts to overturn the election by the Trump campaign.

== Candidate participation timeline ==
Candidate announcement and, if applicable, withdrawal dates are as follows:

Political party
Alliance Party
American Solidarity Party
Birthday Party
Bread and Roses Party
Constitution Party
Democratic Party
Green Party
Independent
Libertarian Party
Progressive Party
Prohibition Party
Reform Party
Republican Party
Party for Socialism and Liberation
Socialist Action
Socialist Equality Party
Socialist Workers Party
Veterans Party of America
Exploratory committee
Events
Midterm elections
Iowa caucuses
Super; Tuesday
COVID-19 pandemic emergency declaration
Election; Day
Inauguration; Day
