= Timeline of the 2020 United States presidential election =

- November 3, 2020

The timeline of the 2020 United States presidential election has been split into three parts for convenience:

- Timeline of the 2020 United States presidential election (2017–2019)
- Timeline of the 2020 United States presidential election (January–October 2020)
- Timeline of the 2020 United States presidential election (November 2020–January 2021)
Democratic Party ticket

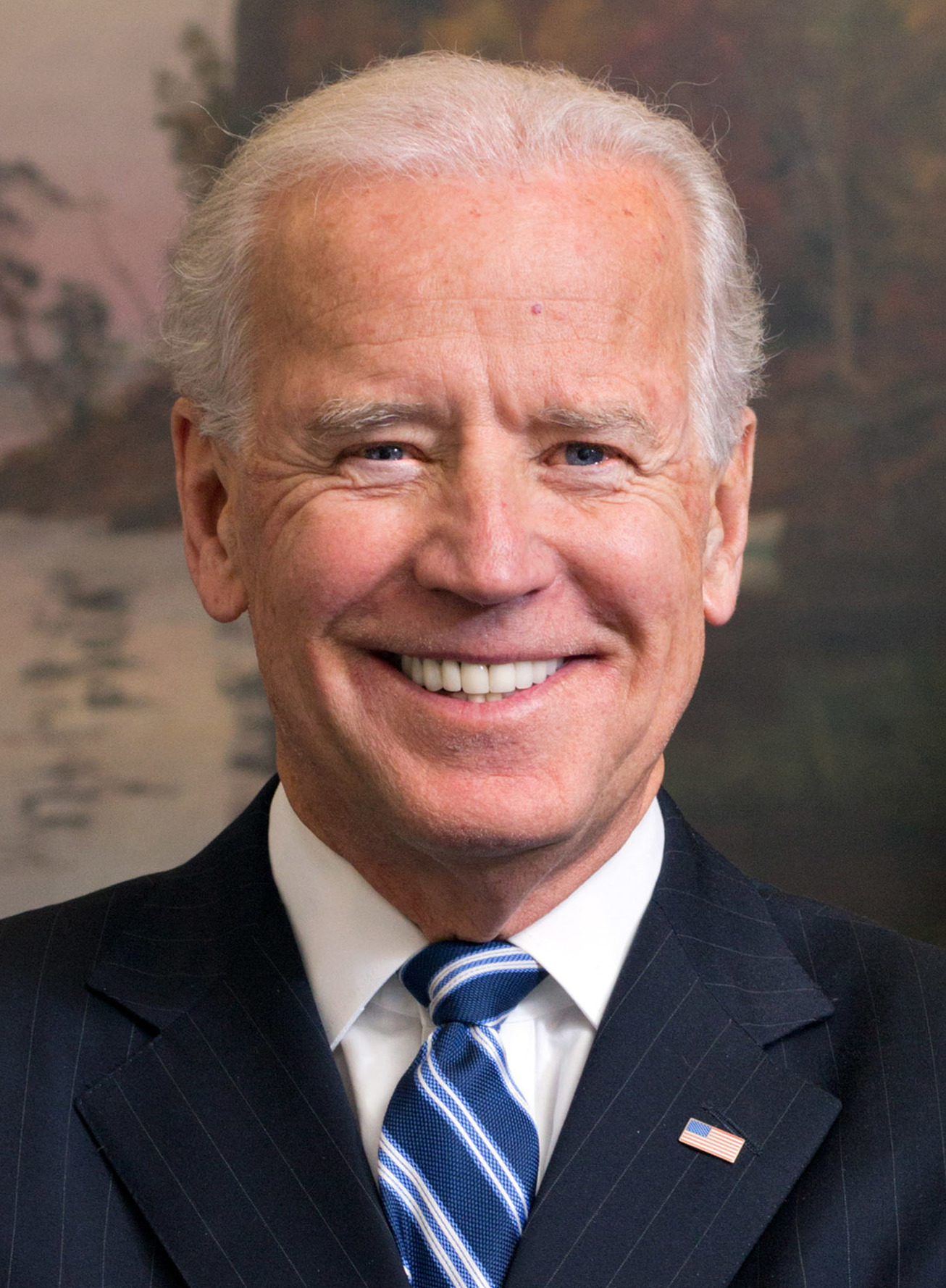
Former Vice President Joe Biden

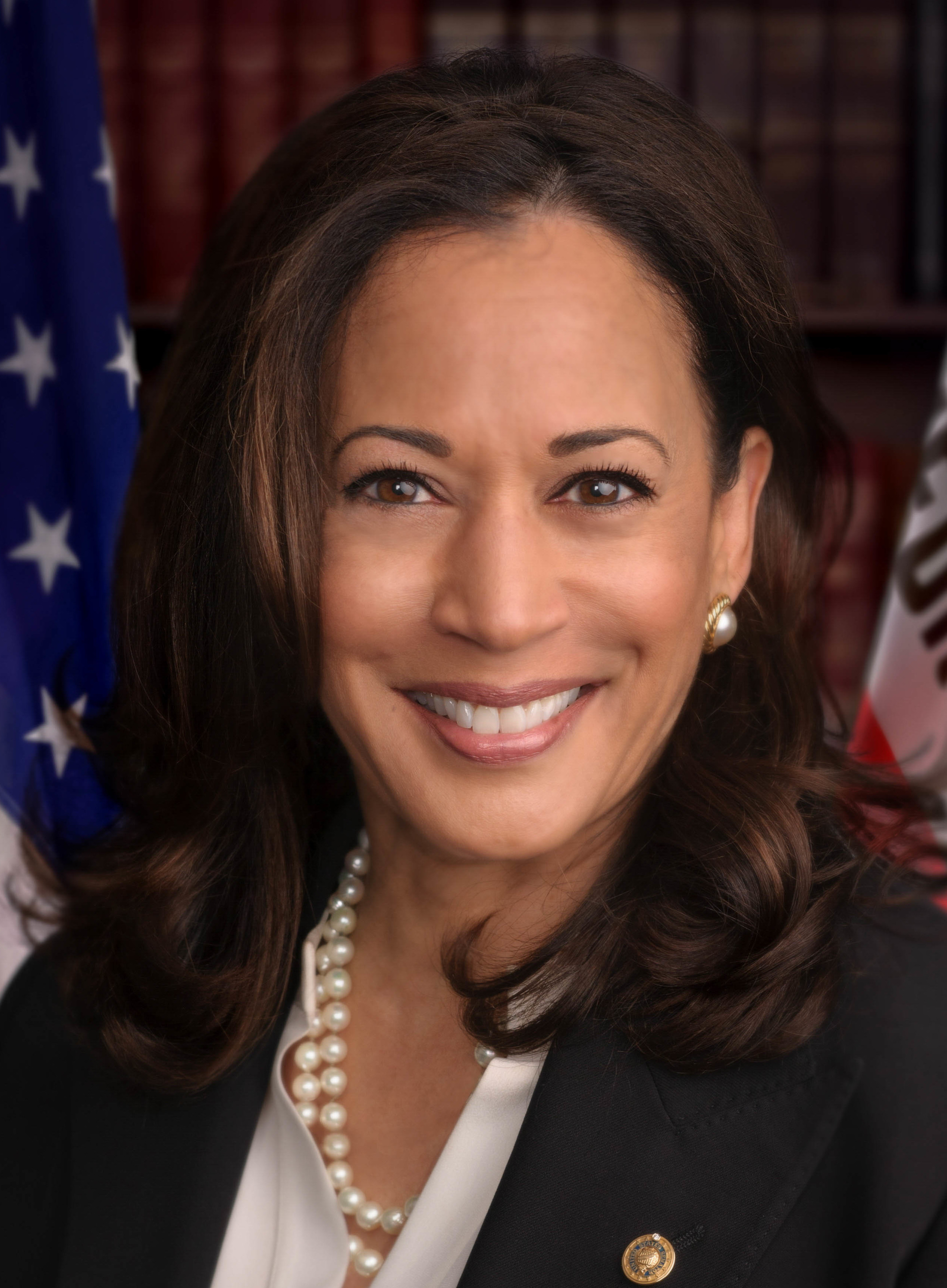
Senator Kamala Harris

Republican Party ticket

President Donald Trump

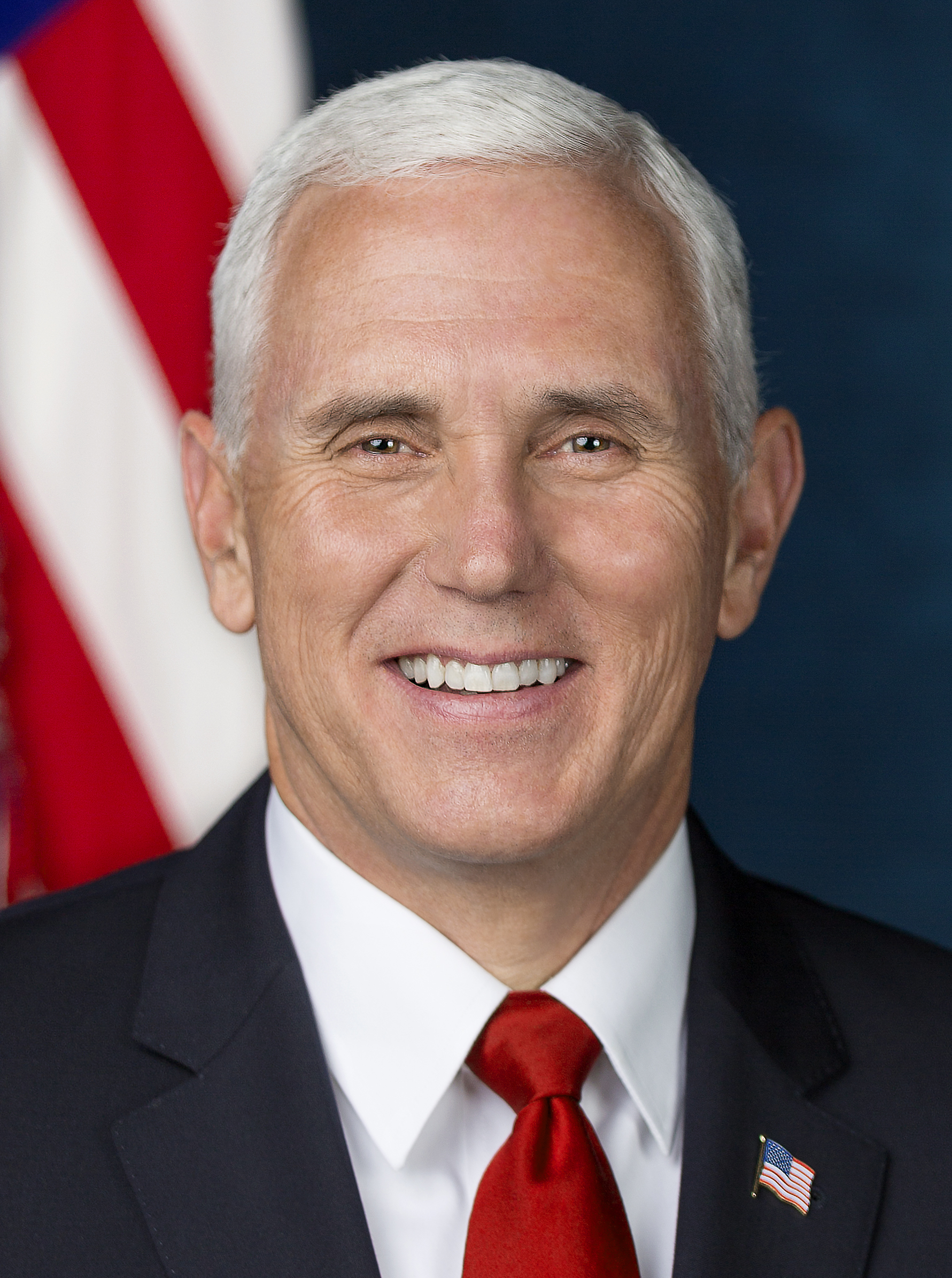
Vice President Mike Pence
