= Timeline of the 2020 United States presidential election (November 2020–January 2021) =

- November 3, 2020

The following is a timeline of major events before, during, and after the 2020 United States presidential election, the 59th quadrennial United States presidential election, from November 2020 to January 2021. For prior events, see Timeline of the 2020 United States presidential election (2017–2019) and Timeline of the 2020 United States presidential election (January–October 2020).

President Donald Trump of the Republican Party, who was elected in 2016, was seeking reelection to a second term, against former vice president Joe Biden of the Democratic Party. The general election was held on November 3, with voters directly selecting their state's members to the U.S. Electoral College. On November 7, most national media organizations projected that Biden had clinched enough electoral votes to be named the U.S. president-elect. The formal voting by the Electoral College took place on December 14. The U.S. Congress then certified the electoral result on January 7, 2021, and Joe Biden was inaugurated on January 20, 2021.

Democratic Party ticket

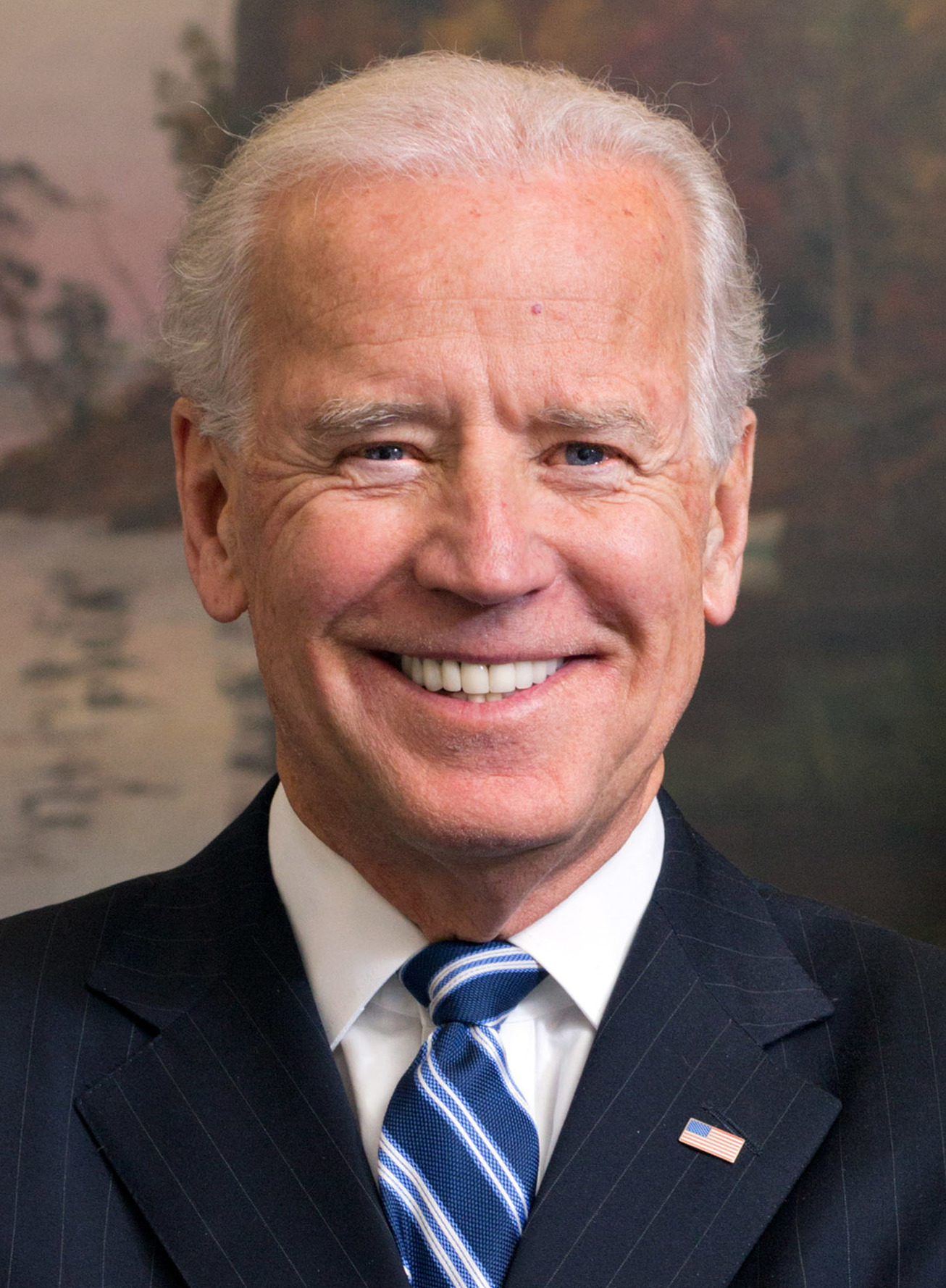
Former Vice President Joe Biden

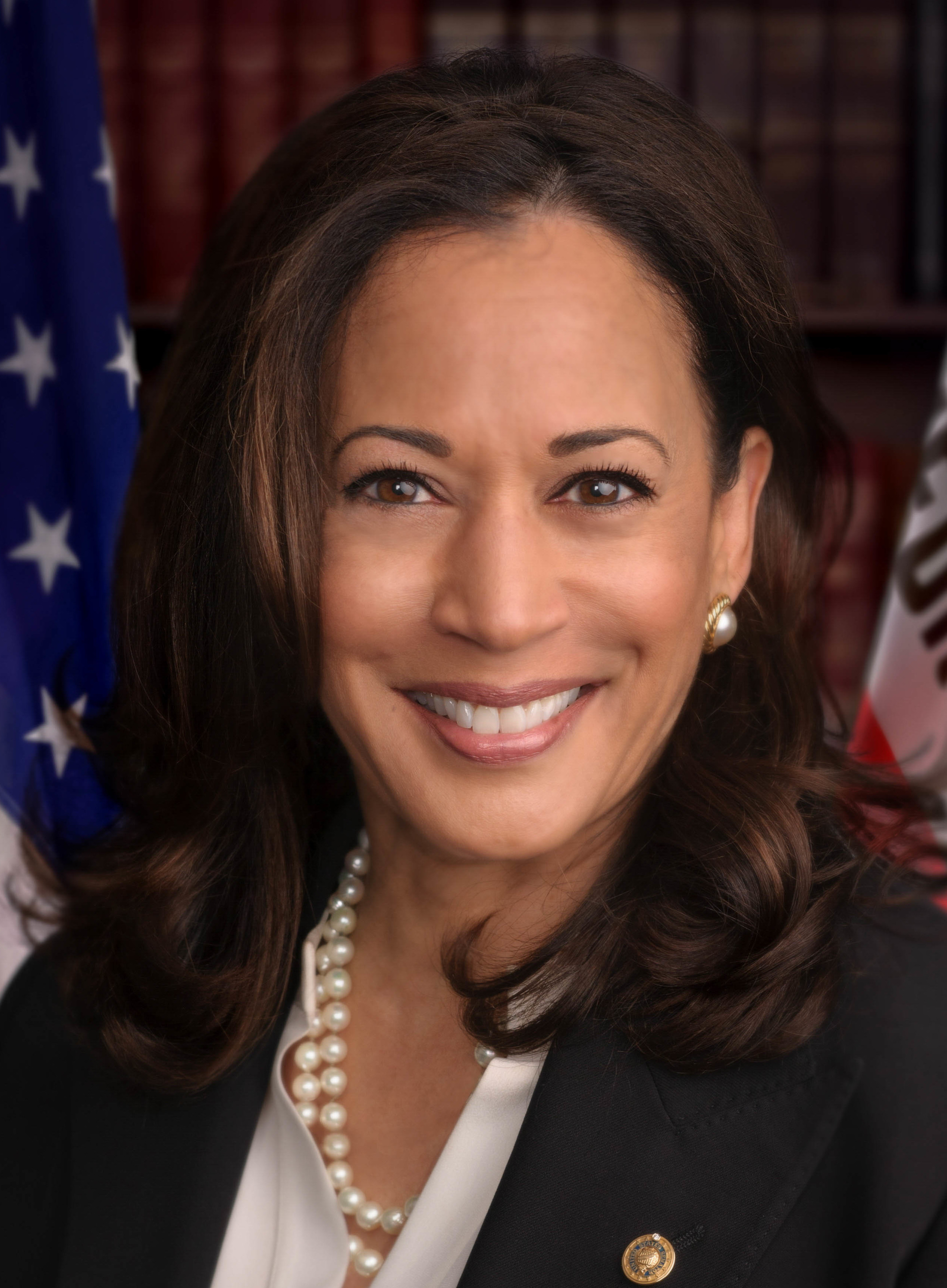
Senator Kamala Harris

Republican Party ticket

President Donald Trump

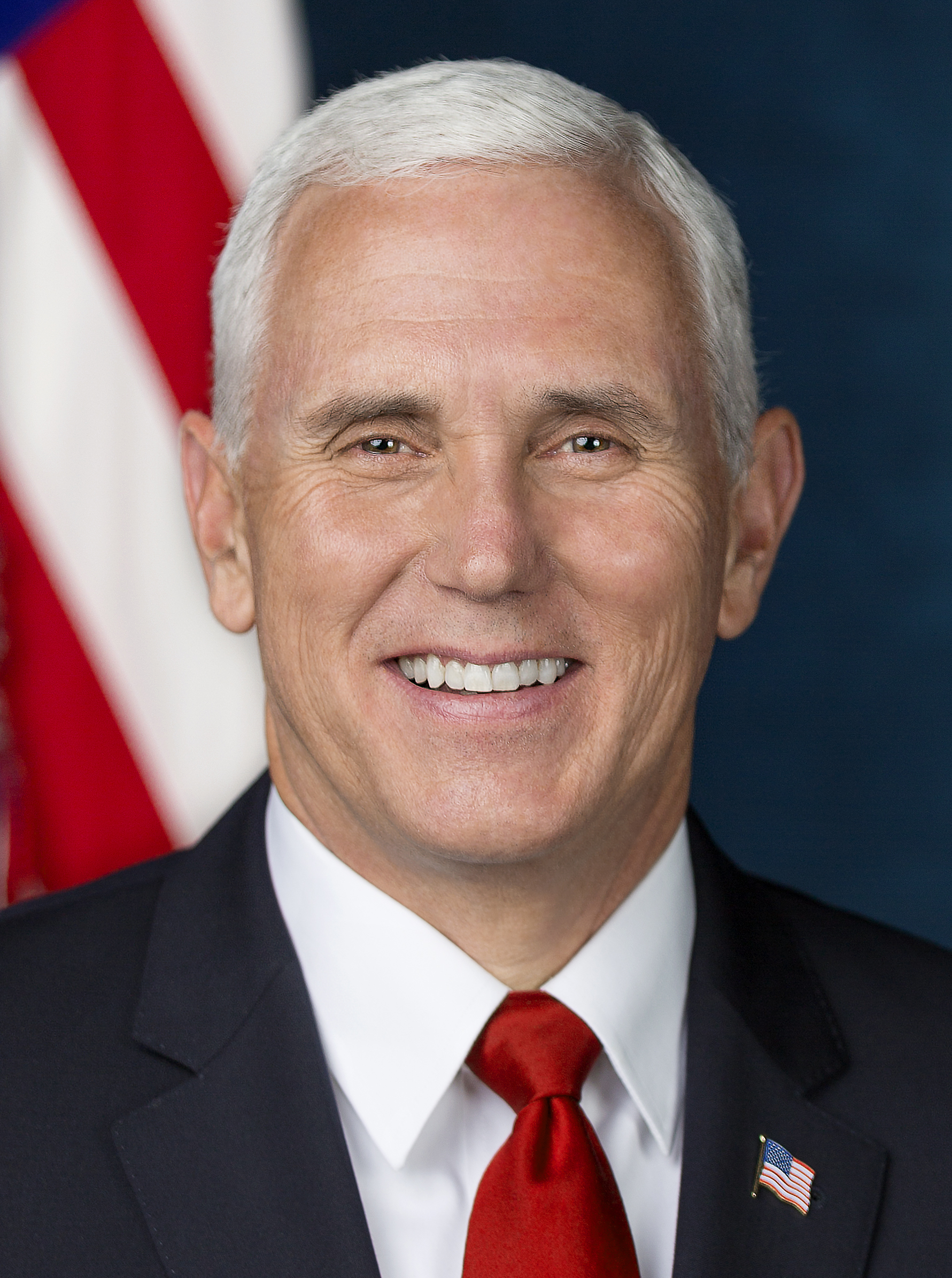
Vice President Mike Pence

== The invisible primary and debate period ==
The "invisible primary" is the first phase of any presidential contest, when hopefuls "test the waters" by forming PACS and "exploratory committees" in order to see if such an endeavor is worthwhile. This is followed by the formal announcement of candidacies, and a period of televised debates and other events prior to the beginning of delegate selection.

== The primary and general election campaigns ==
There are three main parts to every election year. The primaries, where delegates to the party's quadrennial convention are selected, the conventions themselves, and the fall general election.

== November 2020 ==
For previous events, see Timeline of the 2020 United States presidential election (January–October 2020)

- November 1:
  - Deadline for early in-person voting in Delaware, Florida, and New York.
  - The Texas Supreme Court rejects a petition submitted by Texas state representative Steve Toth and two other Republican candidates running for office in Texas who were seeking to invalidate nearly 127,000 drive-thru votes in Harris County, Texas.
  - Biden campaigns in Philadelphia.
  - Harris campaigns in Gwinnett County, Georgia; Goldsboro, North Carolina; and Fayetteville, North Carolina.
  - Trump holds rallies in Washington, Michigan; Dubuque, Iowa; Hickory, North Carolina; Rome, Georgia; and Opa-locka, Florida. For the third time in a week, this time in Georgia, hundreds of people who attended the rally are left stranded for hours in freezing temperatures.
- November 1–2: "Trump Train" caravans of the president's supporters block traffic along several highways and bridges across the country. Several people take to Twitter to point out that this is hypocritical when Trump and many other high-profile conservatives have previously denounced many liberal and civil rights protesters who have similarly blocked traffic on major highways and bridges.
- November 2:
  - Deadline for mail-in ballots to be received by election officials in Louisiana. and Vermont
  - Deadline for mail-in ballots to be postmarked in Alabama, Iowa, North Dakota, Ohio, and Utah.
  - US District Judge Andrew Hanen rejects a federal lawsuit brought by Toth and his Texas Republican group seeking to invalidate the estimated 127,000 drive-thru votes in Harris County, Texas, ruling that they failed to prove an "evil motive".
  - Biden campaigns in Pittsburgh, Pennsylvania, and Cleveland.
  - Harris campaigns in Philadelphia, Lehigh Valley, and Luzerne County, Pennsylvania.
  - Trump holds rallies in Fayetteville, North Carolina; Scranton, Pennsylvania; Traverse City, Michigan; Kenosha, Wisconsin; and Grand Rapids, Michigan.
  - Pence campaigns in Latrobe and Erie, Pennsylvania.
- November 3 (Election Day):
  - Deadline for mail-in ballots to be received by election officials in Alabama, Arizona, Arkansas, Colorado, Connecticut, Delaware, Florida, Georgia, Hawaii, Idaho, Indiana, Maine, Michigan, Missouri, Montana, Nebraska, New Hampshire, New Mexico, Oklahoma, Oregon (all-mail voting state), Rhode Island, South Carolina, South Dakota, Tennessee, Texas, Wisconsin, and Wyoming.
  - Deadline for mail-in ballots to be postmarked in Alaska, California, Illinois, Kansas, Kentucky, Maryland, Massachusetts, Minnesota, Mississippi, Nevada, New Jersey, New York, North Carolina, Pennsylvania, Virginia, Washington, and West Virginia.
  - Polling hours (all times given are in Eastern Standard Time (EST), or UTC−05:00):
    - 12:30 a.m.: Polls close in the New Hampshire midnight voting. Voters in Dixville Notch select Biden 5–0, while those in Millsfield vote for Trump 16–5. Due to the COVID-19 pandemic, Hart's Location delays its traditional midnight voting to the daylight hours.
    - 5:00 a.m.: Polls close in Guam (8:00 p.m. ChST (UTC+10:00)), whose presidential straw poll generally receives national media attention as an indicator of how the rest of the country may likely vote.
    - 6:00 a.m. to 12:00 p.m.: Polls open across the 50 states and DC, with the last being Hawaii at 12 p.m. EST/7 a.m. HST
    - 6:00 p.m.: Polls close in the Eastern Time Zone sections of Indiana and Kentucky
    - 7:00 p.m.: Polls close in:
      - Selected areas of New Hampshire
      - The Eastern Time Zone sections of Florida
      - The Central Time Zone sections of Indiana and Kentucky (6:00 p.m. CST)
      - All of Georgia, South Carolina, Virginia, and Vermont
    - 7:30 p.m.: Polls close in North Carolina, Ohio, and West Virginia
    - 8:00 p.m.: Polls close in:
      - Selected areas of North Dakota (7:00 p.m. CST, observed by the polling locations)
      - The remaining areas of New Hampshire
      - The Eastern Time Zone sections of Michigan
      - The Central Time Zone sections of Florida, Kansas, South Dakota, and Texas (7:00 p.m. CST)
      - All of Alabama, Illinois, Mississippi, Missouri, Oklahoma (7:00 p.m. CST), Tennessee (7:00 p.m. CST / 8:00 p.m. EST), Connecticut, Delaware, Maine, Maryland, Massachusetts, New Jersey, Pennsylvania, Rhode Island, and Washington, D.C.
    - 8:30 p.m.: Polls close in Arkansas (7:30 p.m. CST)
    - 9:00 p.m.: Polls close in:
      - The remaining areas of North Dakota (7:00 p.m. MST, observed by the polling locations)
      - The Central Time Zone sections of Michigan (8:00 p.m. CST)
      - The Mountain Time Zone sections of Kansas, South Dakota, and Texas (7:00 p.m. MST)
      - All of Arizona, Colorado, New Mexico, Wyoming (7:00 p.m. MST), Nebraska (7:00 p.m. MST / 8:00 p.m. CST), Louisiana, Minnesota, Wisconsin (8:00 p.m. CST), and New York
    - 10:00 p.m.: Polls close in:
      - The Mountain Time Zone sections of Idaho and Oregon (8:00 p.m. MST)
      - All of Nevada (7:00 p.m. PST), Montana, Utah (8:00 p.m. MST), and Iowa (9:00 p.m. CST)
    - 11:00 p.m.: Polls close in:
      - The Pacific Time Zone sections of Idaho and Oregon (8:00 p.m. PST)
      - All of California and Washington (8:00 p.m. PST)
  - Judge Sullivan orders the US Postal Service to immediately sweep mail facilities in 12 areas in key swing states to find missing, undelivered mail-in ballots, but the USPS replies that it cannot follow the order during this busy Election Day and conducts its preplanned inspection schedule instead. Under a lawsuit filed by several civil rights groups, the USPS had previously reported to Sullivan that about 300,000 ballots that had entered its system had not been scanned as delivered.
  - After 7:00 p.m.: With some states counting their absentee and early voting ballots first, while other states waiting to process those ballots last, the first reported totals in some areas show "blue mirages" or "red mirages" that initially break heavily for Biden or Trump, respectively, before they eventually flip the other way.
  - 11:20 p.m.: Fox News projects that Arizona is first state to flip from Trump in 2016 to Biden. Trump and members of his campaign immediately show displeasure with the traditionally pro-Trump news channel calling the state as only 73 percent of the state's vote had been reported.
- November 4:
  - 12:00 a.m.: Polls close in:
    - The Alaska Time Zone sections of Alaska (November 3, 8:00 p.m. AKST)
    - All of Hawaii (November 3, 7:00 p.m. HST)
  - 12:30 a.m.: With several states still too close to call, Biden addresses supporters and urges patience with the vote counting, saying that he is confident he is going to eventually win.
  - 1:00 a.m.: Polls close in the Hawaii–Aleutian Time Zone sections of Alaska. (November 3, 8:00 p.m. HST)
  - 2:30 a.m.: Trump addresses supporters at the White House and references the ballots still remaining to be counted, saying "A very sad group of people is trying to disenfranchise [those voters who voted for me] and we won't stand for it ... We'll be going to the US Supreme Court; we want all voting to stop. We don't want them to find any ballots at 4 in the morning, and add them to the list ... We were getting ready to win this election. Frankly, we did win this election."
  - 2:50 a.m.: The Associated Press also declares that Biden is the projected winner in Arizona.
  - 9:00 a.m.: Counting of absentee/mail-in ballots begins in many states.
  - Afternoon:
    - The Trump campaign announces the following throughout the afternoon:
      - They are filing a lawsuit in Michigan to halt the vote counting until they are given "meaningful access" to observe the ballots at multiple counting locations. They also want to review all the ballots that have already been counted.
      - They are requesting a recount in Wisconsin, as they trail Biden by less than 1 percent. Under Wisconsin law, any candidate may request a recount when the margin is that tight.
      - They are filing a lawsuit in Georgia based on a Republican poll watcher's claims that they witnessed an election worker in Chatham County combining late-arriving ballots with ballots that arrived on time.
      - Another lawsuit is being filed in Philadelphia challenging a policy that requires poll watchers to keep 25 feet away from the ballot counting.
    - In response to Trump's challenges, "Count Every Vote" protesters begin marching through several cities.
  - 6:00 p.m.: The Associated Press projects that Biden has reached 264 electoral votes with wins in Michigan and Wisconsin (two more states that flipped from Trump in 2016 to Biden), meaning that he just needs one of the remaining uncalled swing states to reach the required 270 to win the election: Georgia (16), Nevada (6), North Carolina (15), or Pennsylvania (20). Despite the Associated Press and Fox News' projections, other national media outlets still list Arizona (11) as too close to call.
  - Approximately 9:00 p.m. to 12:00 a.m. (7:00 p.m. to 10:00 p.m. MST): More than 200 Trump supporters protest at a Maricopa County, Arizona elections center and around downtown Phoenix, claiming some ballots have not been properly counted. This follows the Trump campaign's continuing belief that the state remains too close to call, and complaints that election officials provided voters with Sharpie pens that may have disqualified ballots. Counting inside the building eventually shuts down early.
- November 5:
  - Speaking to reporters, Biden urges the public to remain calm and that "Democracy is sometimes messy".
  - At a press conference at the White House, Trump continues claiming voter fraud without providing specific evidence.
  - The Chatham County, Georgia Superior Court dismisses Trump's lawsuit over the handling of absentee ballots, ruling that "there is no evidence that the ballots referenced in the petition were received after 7pm on election day".
  - The Michigan Court of Claims dismisses Trump's lawsuit to temporarily halt the ballot counting until Republican poll watchers have sufficient access to observe it. The state court rules on grounds that filing it against the Michigan Secretary of State was improper because the office is not directly involved with that part of the local counting process. In addition, "it was filed at 4:00, at which point the count had largely proceeded".
  - The Nevada Republican Party sends a criminal referral to U.S. Attorney General Barr, alleging over 3,000 cases of voter fraud.
  - A Pennsylvania state judge grants Trump's request and allows poll watchers to observe the Philadelphia ballot counting "within 6 feet, while [still] adhering to all COVID-19 protocols" instead of being forced to observe further back. The Philadelphia County Board of Elections then appeals the case to the Pennsylvania Supreme Court.
  - US District Judge Paul S. Diamond hears arguments for a similar federal case involving Trump poll watchers claiming they had not been given equal access as Democrats during the Philadelphia ballot counting. Diamond dismisses the case without prejudice after the Trump campaign and Pennsylvania election officials reach an agreement.
- November 6:
  - Deadline for mail-in ballots to be received by election officials in Kansas, Kentucky, Massachusetts, Pennsylvania, and Virginia.
  - As Biden overtakes Trump in the Georgia and Pennsylvania ballot counts, Trump tweets, "Joe Biden should not wrongfully claim the office of the President. I could make that claim also. Legal proceedings are just now beginning!"
  - With the updated Pennsylvania ballot counts, the election-calling organization Decision Desk HQ announces that it now projects Biden as the winner of that state, and thus becomes the first major election reporting organization to declare that he has reached the required 270 electoral votes to be named the U.S. President-elect. Those organizations that use Decision Desk HQ's services such as Vox and Business Insider repeat the call that Biden is the winner of the election. However, the Associated Press, Fox News, and other organizations continue to list Pennsylvania as too close to call.
  - With the vote still too close to call in his state, Georgia Secretary of State Brad Raffensperger says that there will likely be a recount.
  - In its first involvement in the election after Election Day, the Supreme Court issues an order signed by Justice Samuel Alito, commanding all Pennsylvania election boards to separately count the mail-in ballots that arrived after Election Day.
  - Pennsylvania State Senate majority leader Jake Corman shoots down rumors that the GOP-controlled Pennsylvania Legislature would bypass the state's popular vote and automatically appoint presidential electors pledged to Trump.
  - During an evening address, Biden reiterates that he is not yet claiming victory, but based on the counts, "What's becoming clear each hour is that a record number of Americans of all races, faiths and religions, chose change over more of the same. They've given us a mandate for action on COVID, the economy, on climate change and systemic racism. They made it clear they want the country to come together not continue to pull apart."
- November 7:
  - CNN, shortly followed by the other major networks, call Pennsylvania for Biden, thus putting him above the required 270 electoral votes to be named President-elect.
  - At same time the networks call Biden as the 2020 presidential winner, Giuliani holds a press conference at Four Seasons Total Landscaping in Philadelphia to discuss the status of Trump campaign's legal challenges to the state's ballot-counting process.
  - It is also determined that both Biden and Trump have exceeded Barack Obama's 2008 record for the most popular votes received by the presidential candidate.
  - Reacting to the news of Biden's projected victory, his supporters celebrate in the streets of various cities across the country.
  - Biden issues a statement saying that "With the campaign over, it's time to put the anger and the harsh rhetoric behind us and come together as a nation". He and Harris later make evening addresses to the nation at the Chase Center in Wilmington, with Biden saying "This is the time to heal in America".
  - Refusing to concede, Trump proceeds with his legal challenges, releasing a statement saying that "this election is far from over. Joe Biden has not been certified as the winner of any states, let alone any of the highly contested states headed for mandatory recounts, or states where our campaign has valid and legitimate legal challenges that could determine the ultimate victor ... until the American People have the honest vote count they deserve and that Democracy demands".
  - Trump supporters protest in front of various state capitol buildings across the country.
  - Trump files a lawsuit in the Arizona Superior Court alleging that in-person ballots were improperly rejected in Maricopa County, Arizona.
- November 8:
  - Deadline for West Virginia mail-in ballots to be received and added to the record-breaking national popular vote totals.
  - Emily W. Murphy, administrator of the General Services Administration (GSA), refuses to sign a letter allowing Biden's transition team to formally begin work, reflecting Trump's position of not conceding yet.
- November 9:
  - Deadline for Iowa mail-in ballots to be received and added to the record-breaking national popular vote totals.
  - During a press conference in which he unveils his COVID-19 task force, Biden urges every American to put political differences aside, saying that he "will be a president for everyone ... This election is over. It's time to put aside the partisanship and the rhetoric that is designed to demonize one another".
  - Biden's transition team suggests that they are contemplating legal action against Murphy and the GSA over refusing to allow them to formally begin work.
  - Barr authorizes the DOJ to investigate voter fraud "if there are clear and apparently-credible allegations of irregularities", going against precedent to not investigate fraud until an election is finalized and prompting the Election Crime Branch's director to resign.
  - Trump's team files a lawsuit in a federal district court in Pennsylvania, seeking an injunction prohibiting Pennsylvania from certifying its results, alleging (among other things) it used an illegal "two-tiered" system in which in-person and by-mail voters were held to different standards.
  - The Pennsylvania Supreme Court agrees to hear Trump's appeal regarding the claims that his poll observers were restricted from inspecting the counting in Philadelphia.
  - Raffensperger rejects calls to step down as Georgia Secretary of State over his handling of the election.
  - The Trump campaign names Congressman Doug Collins of Georgia to lead their Georgia recount effort.
- November 10:
  - Deadline for mail-in ballots to be received by election officials in the disputed state of Nevada.
  - Deadline for mail-in ballots to be received and counted towards the record-breaking national popular vote totals in Minnesota, Mississippi, New Jersey, and New York.
  - At a press conference, Biden says that his transition process is moving forward, and that Trump's refusal to concede is "an embarrassment, quite frankly ... At the end of the day, you know, it's all going to come to fruition on January 20".
  - A group of ten Republican state attorneys general file an amicus brief with the Supreme Court supporting Trump's case challenging the Pennsylvanian late mail-in ballots.
  - The New York Times reports that it has contacted the offices of the top election officials in at least 45 states and not one of them suspect or have evidence of voting fraud.
  - A group of Pennsylvania Republican state legislators call for an audit of the state's presidential election results before they are certified and its electors are selected.
  - The Trump campaign files a lawsuit in the U.S. District Court for the Western District of Michigan, seeking to prevent the state from certifying its results until its allegations of election misconduct in Michigan are addressed.
  - The Nevada Supreme Court dismisses the Trump campaign's appeal challenging Clark County, Nevada's election processes, ruling that there was no evidence of wrongdoing. In light of the ruling, the Trump campaign drops their challenges seeking to stop the Clark County ballot counting.
- November 11: Raffensperger officially announces Georgia's hand recount.
- November 12:
  - Deadline for mail-in ballots to be received by election officials in the too-close-to call state of North Carolina.
  - Two coalitions of federal and state election officials, the Election Infrastructure Government Coordinating Council and the Election Infrastructure Sector Coordinating Council, issue a joint statement saying, "There is no evidence that any voting system deleted or lost votes, changed votes, or was in any way compromised."
  - A Pennsylvania state court rules in favor of Trump, stating that Pennsylvania Secretary of State Kathy Boockvar "lacked statutory authority" to extend a deadline for mail-in voters who still needed to submit proof of identification. Boockvar had moved the deadline from November 9 to November 12. Thus the court orders the state to toss out those such ballots that were cured during the extended deadline period. The Philadelphia Inquirer estimates that the number of ballots that will be tossed out is small and not significantly cut into Biden's lead.
- November 13:
  - Deadline for mail-in ballots to be received by election officials, and thus added to the national popular vote totals, in Ohio and Maryland.
  - The Trump campaign drops an Arizona lawsuit based on claims by some voters who allege that poll workers mishandled ballots rejected by the tabulation machines, as the number of votes potentially being contested would not overcome Biden's lead in the state.
  - Boockvar confirms that there will be no automatic Pennsylvania recount because the margin is greater than 0.5 percent.
  - The Third Circuit Court in Wayne County, Michigan rejects a petition by two Republican poll challengers seeking to stop the county's vote certification, alleging fraud by poll workers. The court ruled that the plaintiffs' "interpretation" of the events were "incorrect and not credible" and "decidedly contradicted" an election expert that was put forth by the defense.
  - The Court of Common Pleas in Philadelphia rejects five Trump petitions challenging five separate batches of votes in which voters failed to either print their names under their signature or print their address on the outer envelope of their mail-in ballot. The court ruled that Philadelphia County's Board of Elections does not make it absolutely mandatory because the information is already pre-printed on those envelopes.
- November 14:
  - Trump criticizes the Georgia ballot recount as a "waste of time", claiming that his campaign's observers are not being let into the counting rooms.
  - Groups of Trump supporters hold "MAGA-palooza" and "Million Maga March" rallies in Washington, D.C. to support for Trump's court challenges. Following the rally, Trump supporters clash with counter-protesters.
- November 15: In a series of tweets, Trump states that Biden "won because the Election was Rigged", referencing an unproven conspiracy theory held by right wing groups alleging that voter tabulation machines manufactured by Dominion Voting Systems had been compromised, resulting in millions of votes for Trump being deleted or switched to Biden. Trump further tweets that Biden "only won in the eyes of the FAKE NEWS MEDIA. I concede NOTHING! We have a long way to go".
- November 16:
  - As the Georgia recount continues, more than 2,600 votes are reportedly uncovered in Floyd County because of a ballot scanning machine's memory card that did not properly get uploaded on Election Day. The Atlanta Journal-Constitution estimates that Trump could get about roughly 800 net votes added to his tally.
  - The Arizona Republican Party files a lawsuit to stop Maricopa County officials from certifying its election results while legal challenges are still in progress.
- November 17:
  - Deadline for Illinois mail-in ballots to be received by election officials and thus added to the record-breaking national popular vote totals.
  - The Pennsylvania Supreme Court delivers its 5-2 decision against Trump's lawsuit alleging that its poll observers were unlawfully restricted from inspecting the counting in Philadelphia.
  - Raffensperger announces that an audit of Georgia's voting machines found no evidence of tampering.
  - Raffensperger later appears in an interview with WSB-TV, claiming that Trump suppressed his own voting base in Georgia: "Twenty-four thousand people did not vote in the fall; either they did not vote absentee because they were told by the president 'don't vote absentee, it's not secure,' ... But then they did not come out and vote in person."
  - The Trump campaign files a new lawsuit in the Nevada First Judicial District Court alleging that "fraud and abuse renders the purported results of the Nevada election illegitimate" and thus either Trump "be declared the winner of the Election in Nevada” or that the results are annulled and no Nevada winner is certified.
- November 17–18:
  - All 72 Wisconsin counties complete their canvassing of the election results by the state's November 17 deadline. The Trump campaign then on the following day pays the $3 million fee to apply for recounts in just Dane and Milwaukee counties, rather than pay the full $8 million fee for a recount of the entire state.
  - The four-member board of canvassers of Wayne County, Michigan vote unanimously to certify its election results after initially being deadlocked along party lines. The two Republican members then ask to rescind their votes, signing affidavits on the day after stating that they voted for the certification only because the two Democratic members promised a full audit of the county's votes.
- November 18: The Trump campaign files its third version of its federal lawsuit over the Pennsylvania results, now claiming that 1.5 million mail-in or absentee votes in seven counties should be thrown out, and thus either he should be named the winner in Pennsylvania or the Pennsylvania Legislature should be given the authority to appoint presidential electors pledged to Trump.
- November 19:
  - Giuliani, Sidney Powell, and other members of Trump's legal team hold a press conference levying their various claims of voter fraud but refuse to reveal specific evidence until they are actually in court, leading the press to conclude that they are just rehashing their previously debunked conspiracy theories.
  - The Maricopa County Superior Court dismisses the Arizona Republican Party's lawsuit seeking to order an audit of the county's ballots.
  - US District Judge Steven D. Grimberg, a Trump-appointee, dismisses the Trump campaign's lawsuit seeking to delay the certification of Georgia's election results, ruling, "It is well established that garden-variety election disputes do not rise to the level of a constitutional deprivation. The fact that [Trump] didn't win doesn't rise to the level of harm".
- November 19–20: The Georgia hand recount ends with Biden still leading Trump by 12,284 votes, only slightly less than the roughly 14,000-vote lead in the initial count, and despite the additional ballots found in Floyd County and other areas. Raffensperger officially certifies these results on the following day, staying that "I believe that the numbers that we have presented today are correct. The numbers reflect the will of the people".
- November 20:
  - Deadline for California mail-in ballots to be received by election officials, and thus added to the record-breaking national popular vote totals.
  - The top two Republicans in the Michigan Legislature, state Senate Majority Leader Mike Shirkey and state House Speaker Lee Chatfield, meet with Trump at the White House, a move that both Michigan and national Democrats criticize as inappropriate. Although Shirkey and Chatfield state they originally wanted to meet the president primarily to discuss COVID-19 relief instead of the election, they say, "We have not yet been made aware of any information that would change the outcome of the election in Michigan and as legislative leaders, we will follow the law and follow the normal process regarding Michigan's electors".
  - Black voter groups in Michigan file a lawsuit against the Trump campaign in the US District Court for the District of Columbia, alleging that their attempts to challenge the election results have disenfranchised Black voters.
  - Nevada District Court Judge Gloria Sturman dismisses a lawsuit brought by a conservative activist seeking to nullify the entire Nevada November election, not just the presidential results. Sturman notes in her ruling that "if the election was thrown out there would be no one holding office, including me".
  - As the recounts continue in Dane County, Wisconsin, election officials there reject the Trump campaign's request to toss out over 69,000 absentee ballots where, among other issues, an election clerk filled in missing address information on the outer envelope, the voter declared themselves to be "indefinitely confined", or where there was not a written application on file.
- November 21:
  - McDaniel joins Michigan Republican Party Chair Laura Cox in asking the Michigan Board of Canvassers to delay certification of the state's election results so that a "full, transparent audit" is conducted. Michigan Secretary of State Jocelyn Benson had previously stated before Cox and McDaniel's request that "election officials do not have legal access to the documents needed to complete audits until the certification".
  - US District Judge Matthew W. Brann dismisses the Trump's campaign lawsuit seeking to block the certification of the Pennsylvania results, ruling that the president's legal team merely presented "strained legal arguments without merit and speculative accusations" that were "unsupported by evidence".
  - The Trump campaign files for a new Georgia recount even though state officials already certified the results.
  - The Maricopa County Superior Court dismisses a lawsuit from two voters regarding voter irregularities, ruling that the two ballots in question will not change the outcome of the election.
  - As the recounts continue in Milwaukee County, Wisconsin, election officials there accuse Trump's poll watchers of breaking rules and obstructing the process by objecting to every ballot tabulators pulled to count.
- November 22:
  - A spokesperson for Dominion Voting Systems defends the company's voting machines during an appearance on Fox News Sunday, saying, "It is not physically possible for our machines to switch votes from one candidate to the other".
  - Trump appeals to the Third U.S. Circuit Court of Appeals, seeking to overturn Judge Brann's previous day ruling and block the certification of the Pennsylvania results.
  - Giuliani issues a statement through the Trump campaign saying that Sidney Powell "is not a member of the Trump Legal Team. She is also not a lawyer for the President in his personal capacity", appearing to cut ties from her increasing convoluted and unsupported allegations of widespread voter fraud.
- November 23:
  - The Michigan Board of State Canvassers certifies the state's election results, with Biden as the official winner.
  - On the day that Pennsylvania was supposed to certify the state's election results:
    - The Pennsylvania Supreme Court dismisses the Trump campaign's lawsuit seeking to block the counting of absentee ballots with missing names or dates.
    - A group of Pennsylvania Republicans attempt to file an emergency lawsuit in state court to halt the certification, seeking the court to strike down the state's expanded mail ballot policy.
    - While most of the state's 67 counties certify their results, Berks, Carbon, Schuylkill, and Westmoreland counties miss the deadline, saying that they need more time.
- November 23–24:
  - After the two-week standoff, including accusations by Democratic leaders claiming that it was "undermining national security", Trump, Murphy, and the GSA reverse course and formally allow Biden's transition team to allow access to the required federal resources. Trump and Murphy however give conflicting reasons on who made the decision first, with Trump tweeting that he is "recommending" the GSA start the process, while Murphy writes in her formal letter to Biden that she "independently" made the decision without being "directly or indirectly pressured by any Executive Branch official — including those who work at the White House or GSA". Given the green light, Biden begins receiving the president's daily classified intelligence brief on the following day, among others. Trump still insists that he is not conceding yet and is continuing his legal challenges.
  - The Trump campaign officially files its amended appeal to the Third U.S. Circuit Court of Appeals seeking to block the certification of the Pennsylvania results. Boockvar and several Pennsylvania counties formally ask to have the case dismissed on the following day, pointing out that the appeal is in an impermissibly "untenable" and "piecemeal" fashion, adding back allegations that Trump's team had previously dropped in the District Court.
- November 24: Minnesota, Nevada, and Pennsylvania certify their respective election results, with Biden as the official winner in all three states.
- November 25:
  - Trump grants a full pardon to Flynn, a move Republican leaders praise and Democratic leaders blast.
  - The DOJ files an appeal to the Second U.S. Circuit Court of Appeals seeking to overturn US District Judge Kaplan's October 27 ruling and allow the agency to represent Trump in Carroll's defamation lawsuit.
  - A Pennsylvania appeals court orders state officials to halt any further steps in certifying the election results, pending a lawsuit by Representative Mike Kelly of Pennsylvania, alleging that the state legislature failed to follow proper procedures when implementing the state's expanded mail-in ballot system. The Pennsylvania Supreme Court then quickly overturns the lower court's order later in the day after Governor Tom Wolf quickly submits an emergency appeal on grounds there is no "conceivable justification" to halt the process.
- November 25–26: Powell files lawsuits in US District Court late on November 25 alleging massive election fraud in Georgia and Michigan. The media analyze her lawsuits on the following Thanksgiving morning, noting that they are full of typos and formatting errors, and repeat the same convoluted claims she has been making during the past few weeks.
- November 26: During a Thanksgiving Day press conference, his first such presser since the election, Trump admits that he would leave the White House if Biden is officially declared the winner of Electoral College, but adds, "If they do, they made a mistake ... It's going to be a very hard thing to concede".
- November 27:
  - The Third U.S. Circuit Court of Appeals rejects the Trump campaign's challenge to the Pennsylvania election results, ruling that the "campaign's claims have no merit ... Charges of unfairness are serious. But calling an election unfair does not make it so. Charges require specific allegations and then proof. We have neither here".
  - The recount in Milwaukee County, Wisconsin ends with Biden getting a net increase of 132 votes.
- November 28: The Pennsylvania Supreme Court unanimously dismisses Kelly's lawsuit seeking to declare the state's expanded mail-in ballot system as unconstitutional.
- November 29:
  - Trump vents his frustrations during an interview on Sunday Morning Futures With Maria Bartiromo, expressing his disbelief that the courts have rejected his claims so far, questions why neither the FBI or the DOJ have not more aggressively looked into his allegations, and states that "my mind will not change in six months. There was tremendous cheating here".
  - The recount in Dane County, Wisconsin ends with Trump getting a net increase of 45 votes. Combined with Biden's net increase of 132 votes in the Milwaukee County recount, Biden still gains a net total of 87 in the partial Wisconsin recount.
- November 30:
  - Arizona and Wisconsin certify their respective election results, with Biden as the official winner in both states.
  - Arizona Republican lawmakers hold a meeting with Giuliani at the Hyatt Regency Phoenix to hear his claims. Both Giuliani and the state lawmakers state that this is a "hearing" but it is not officially a legislative event. Several hundred Trump supporters march outside the hotel while the meeting is held.
  - US District Judge Timothy Batten orders Georgia officials not to reset Dominion voting machines used in Cherokee, Cobb, and Gwinnett counties, pending Powell's lawsuit.
  - Georgia governor Brian Kemp officially rejects Trump's call to overrule both Raffensperger and the state's certified election results with an executive order, stating that Georgia law prohibits its governor from interfering in elections in that manner. Raffensperger also states in a press conference that "There are those who are exploiting the emotions of many Trump supporters with fantastic claims, half-truths, misinformation. And, frankly, they are misleading the president as well, apparently".

== December 2020 ==
- December 1:
  - The Trump campaign files a new lawsuit in the Wisconsin Supreme Court seeking to overturn the state's certified election results and toss out about 221,000 ballots, claiming that they were improperly issued and counted.
  - Powell also files a lawsuit against the Wisconsin Elections Commission in the U.S. District Court for the Eastern District of Wisconsin, also challenging the state's election results.
  - In an interview with the Associated Press, Barr states that the DOJ has not found any evidence of widespread voter fraud that would change the outcome of the election.
  - A Michigan Senate committee holds a hearing on the Detroit vote counting operations, with poll challengers, officials, and other Trump supporters presenting their claims of voting irregularities.
  - Both Trump attorneys and representatives of Nevada's six electors pledged to Biden inspect voting materials at the main Clark County ballot counting center, ahead of a December 3 hearing on Trump's lawsuit challenging the state's election results.
- December 2:
  - During an interview with New York Times columnist Thomas Friedman, Biden says that "I feel like I've done something good for the country" by beating Trump.
  - Trump posts a pre-recorded video address on Facebook, repeating his allegations of voter fraud.
  - Republican representative Mo Brooks of Alabama announces that he plans to submit an objection to the Electoral College votes when the joint session of Congress meets on January 6 to officially count them.
  - Raffensperger states during a press conference that the second Georgia recount requested by the Trump campaign shows no substantive change: "It looks like Vice President Biden will be carrying Georgia".
  - Three voter advocacy groups file a lawsuit in the US District Court for the Northern District of Georgia, alleging that about 200,000 Georgia voters were wrongly removed from voter registration lists prior to the election after they were incorrectly assumed to have moved or changed their addresses.
  - The Trump campaign files a lawsuit against the Wisconsin Elections Commission in the U.S. District Court for the Eastern District of Wisconsin, alleging "unlawful and unconstitutional acts".
  - Giuliani appears before a Michigan House Oversight committee for over three hours presenting his allegations of widespread voter fraud, asking questions of witnesses who accompanied him, but still without providing concrete evidence.
- December 3:
  - The Pennsylvania Supreme Court rejects a last-ditch bid by Republican challengers to halt further action on the certification of the state's election results.
  - With Kelly appealing his Pennsylvania lawsuit to the U.S. Supreme Court, Justice Alito sets a December 9 deadline for Pennsylvania state officials to respond to the petition. Because that is the day after the December 8 "safe harbor" deadline, where states must finally resolve any controversies over the selection of their electors, experts say that the U.S. Supreme Court is unlikely to rule in Kelly's favor and overturn the Pennsylvania Supreme Court's previous decision.
  - The Wisconsin Supreme Court declines to hear Trump's latest lawsuit seeking to overturn the state's certified election results, stating that the case needs to go through state's lower courts first.
  - The Georgia State Senate holds a hearing on the allegations of voter fraud. The Trump campaign presents security video of the Fulton County ballot counting that was held inside State Farm Arena on election night, claiming that it shows bags of fraudulent ballots being "pulled from a table" by election workers and illegally counted after Republican observers left the building. On cross-examination by Democratic state senator Jen Jordan, the Trump campaign's witness is unable to back up the claims that these ballots were indeed fraudulent.
- December 3–4: During a hearing before the Nevada First Judicial District Court, Trump's lawyers seeking to overturn the state's election results claim that approximately 1,500 dead voters cast ballots, 42,000 voted twice, 2,500 voters had moved out of the state, and about 20,000 cast a ballot without providing a Nevada address. The court then delivers its decision against Trump on the following day, ruling, "Contestants did not prove under any standard of proof that any illegal votes were cast and counted, or legal votes were not counted at all, for any other improper or illegal reason, nor in an amount equal to or greater than 33,596, or otherwise in an amount sufficient to raise reasonable doubt as to the outcome of the election."
- December 4:
  - The Michigan Court of Appeals rejects the Trump campaign's appeal to overturn a lower court's previous decision, ruling that "the only valid recourse at the time would have been to request a recount, but the window to do so had passed ... Because plaintiff failed to follow the clear law in Michigan relative to such matters, their action is moot".
  - The Minnesota Supreme Court dismisses a lawsuit brought by a group of Minnesota Republicans seeking to stop the certification of the state's election results and order a full recount. The ruling cites the late filing of the petition on November 24, just hours before the elections results were officially certified, and that two of their key arguments regarded events and policies that took place before early voting began on September 18.
  - With California certifying its election results, Biden officially clinches enough pledged electors needed for the December 14 Electoral College vote to capture the presidency.
- December 5:
  - Republican senators John Cornyn of Texas and Mike Braun of Indiana admit that any Electoral College vote challenges submitted by Representative Brooks or any others during the January 6 joint session of Congress is unlikely to get the necessary approval by both the Democratic-controlled House and the narrowly divided Senate.
  - The 11th U.S. Circuit Court of Appeals affirms District Judge Grimberg's November decision to not halt the certification of Georgia's election results, noting that this was now moot.
  - Trump reportedly contacts Kemp to pressure the Georgia governor to call a special session of the state legislature to ignore Georgia's certified results and appoint electors pledged to Trump.
  - While stumping for the Republican candidates in the January 5 Georgia Senate runoff elections at a rally in Valdosta, Trump continues to insist the election was rigged.
- December 6:
  - The New York Times publishes a story citing anonymous sources claiming that Barr is considering resigning as attorney general before the end of the year instead of remaining until Trump's term ends.
  - Appearing on ABC's This Week and CNN's State of the Union, respectively, Raffensperger and Georgia Lieutenant Governor Geoff Duncan rule out the possibility that their state legislature will ignore Georgia's certified results and appoint electors pledged to Trump.
  - Giuliani tests positive for COVID-19 and is admitted into MedStar Georgetown University Hospital in Washington, D.C. Concerns grow that he may have spread the virus while crisscrossing the country attending the hearings of various courts and state legislatures on Trump's behalf. The Arizona State Legislature in particular decides to shut down for the rest of the week.
- December 7:
  - Federal District judges reject both of Powell's last-ditch lawsuits in Georgia and Michigan. District Judge Timothy Batten rules in Powell's Georgia lawsuit that he is unwilling for his court "to substitute its judgment for two-and-a-half million voters who voted for Joe Biden". And District Judge Linda Parker rules that the Michigan lawsuit "seems to be less about achieving the relief Plaintiffs seek — as much of that relief is beyond the power of this Court — and more about the impact of their allegations on People's faith in the democratic process and their trust in our government".
  - The Washington Post publishes a report stating that Trump has contacted Bryan Cutler, the Republican Speaker of the Pennsylvania House of Representatives, two times within the past week to pressure him and the Republican-controlled state legislature to ignore Pennsylvania's certified results and appoint electors pledged to Trump.
  - Raffensperger officially re-certifies Georgia's election results following the second state recount completed during the previous week, still showing Biden winning the state.
  - The Fulton County Superior Court in Georgia initially rejects a lawsuit filed by the Trump campaign due to faulty paperwork, but later accepts the case after Trump's attorneys return to correct the paperwork in the afternoon. The lawsuit alleges that, among others, tens of thousands of ineligible voters in the Atlanta area cast ballots, including felons, people who registered when they were underage, and out-of-state residents.
- December 7–8: Texas Attorney General Ken Paxton sues the states of Georgia, Michigan, Pennsylvania and Wisconsin in order to invalidate the presidential election results in those states; the lawsuit, Texas v. Pennsylvania, is filed with the U.S. Supreme Court as it has, under Article Three of the U.S. Constitution, original jurisdiction over disputes between states. The lawsuit alleges that the four states unconstitutionally used the COVID-19 pandemic as a pretext to change voting laws and increase the number of mail-in ballots. Georgia Attorney General Christopher M. Carr, Michigan Attorney General Dana Nessel, Pennsylvania Attorney General Josh Shapiro, and Wisconsin Attorney General Josh Kaul each respond critically to the lawsuit on the following morning.
- December 8:
  - The "safe harbor" deadline under the Electoral Count Act, where states must finally resolve any controversies over the selection of their electors of the Electoral College.
  - Lawyers for Pennsylvania respond to Kelly's appeal to the U.S. Supreme Court, stating that it is "an affront to constitutional democracy" and that "Petitioners ask this court to undertake one of the most dramatic, disruptive invocations of judicial power in the history of the Republic. No court has ever issued an order nullifying a governor's certification of presidential election results." The high court then rejects Kelly's lawsuit in a one-sentence, unsigned order.
  - Powell appeals her Georgia lawsuit to the 11th U.S. Circuit Court of Appeals.
  - With speculation that Trump may grant himself a preemptive self-pardon before he leaves office, New York State Attorney General Letitia James suggests during an interview on The View that he could instead resign before his term ends on January 20 and have Pence grant him the pardon.
  - The Nevada Supreme Court unanimously rules to dismiss the Trump's campaign's appeal seeking to overturn the state's election results, affirming the Nevada First Judicial District Court's ruling that they failed to identify any direct "unsupported factual findings".
  - Wisconsin becomes the only state to miss the "safe harbor" deadline with cases still pending.
- December 9:
  - Trump tweets that his team "will be intervening" in the Texas v. Pennsylvania Supreme Court case before his attorneys later officially file a motion to do so. Eighteen other states (Alabama, Arizona, Arkansas, Florida, Indiana, Kansas, Louisiana, Mississippi, Missouri, Montana, Nebraska, North Dakota, Oklahoma, South Carolina, South Dakota, Tennessee, Utah, and West Virginia) also throw in their support and file briefs for Texas and Trump.
  - Twenty-seven Republican representatives urge Trump to direct Barr to appoint a special counsel to investigate the election irregularities.
  - Both Hunter Biden and the Biden transition team admit that he is under federal investigation over his taxes.
  - U.S. District Judge Diane Humetewa tosses out a lawsuit by Arizona voters, the last one against the state's election results, citing "baseless claims".
  - U.S. District Judge Pamela Pepper dismisses Powell's lawsuit against the Wisconsin Elections Commission, stating that the "federal court has no authority or jurisdiction to grant the relief the remaining plaintiff seeks".
  - West Virginia becomes the last state to certify its presidential election results.
Map of states in the Texas v. Pennsylvania case
Plaintiff (Texas)
Defendants (WI, MI, PA, GA)
States with attorneys general filing brief in support of Texas
States with attorneys general filing brief in support of the Defendants. The District of Columbia also filed. The U.S. Territories, Guam and the U.S. Virgin Islands, have also filed briefs.
States with attorneys general filing brief in support of neither side
States where the A.G. and Governor have filed opposing briefs
- December 10: Parties file briefs/motions in Texas v. Pennsylvania:
  - On the plaintiff side, Arkansas, Utah, Louisiana, Missouri, Mississippi, and South Carolina move from amicus status to actually joining the suit avec Texas. Over 100 Republican House Representatives also file an amicus in support of Texas.
  - On the defendant side, the four sued states respond, urging the Court to not accept the case, calling it a "seditious abuse of the judicial process". The District of Columbia, 2 territories (Guam and the U.S. Virgin Islands), and 20 states (California, Colorado, Connecticut, Delaware, Hawaii, Illinois, Maine, Maryland, Massachusetts, Minnesota, Nevada, New Jersey, New Mexico, New York, North Carolina, Oregon, Rhode Island, Vermont, Virginia, and Washington) file a brief in support of the defendants. A group of former Republican office holders and officials also file a separate brief in support of the defendants.
  - Montana Governor Steve Bullock files a separate brief in support of the defendants, opposing the previous day's brief by Montana Attorney General Tim Fox in support of the plaintiffs.
  - Ohio files a motion supporting neither side, but stating that they "need this Court to decide, at the earliest available opportunity, the question whether the Electors Clause permits state courts (and state executive officials) to alter the rules by which presidential elections are conducted".
- December 11:
  - The U.S. Supreme Court issues an unsigned order declining to hear Texas v. Pennsylvania on the basis that Texas lacks standing under Article Three of the Constitution: "Texas has not demonstrated a judicially cognizable interest in the manner in which another State conducts its elections". Justice Alito, joined by Justice Clarence Thomas, partially dissents, writing that the Court is duty-bound to hear the case, referencing Arizona v. California: "I would therefore grant the motion to file the bill of complaint but would not grant other relief, and I express no view on any other issue".
  - Powell appeals her Michigan case directly to the U.S. Supreme Court, bypassing the U.S. Court of Appeals by filing a petition for a writ of certiorari before judgment.
- December 11–12: The Wisconsin Supreme Court agrees to hear Trump's lawsuit seeking to throw out more than 221,000 ballots, hours after the state's circuit court ruled against it, holding a rare Saturday session on the following day.
- December 12:
  - U.S. District Judge Brett Ludwig dismisses the Trump campaign's lawsuit against the Wisconsin Elections Commission, ruling that the allegations "fail as a matter of law and fact".
  - A report commissioned by the Iowa Democratic Party finds that actions by the Democratic National Committee in trying to implement a new app-based reporting system, combined with missteps by the state Democratic Party, were to blame for the weeks-long delay in the reporting of the results of the February Iowa Democratic caucuses. These issues combined with the state's overwhelmingly white electorate may put the Iowa Democratic caucuses' status as "first in the nation" in jeopardy for 2024.
  - Trump supporters hold rallies in Washington, D.C. in front of the Supreme Court, the Capitol, and the Department of Justice. They later clash with counter-protesters near the White House, forcing police to use smoke bombs to subdue the rising tension.
- December 13:
  - During an interview with Fox & Friends Weekend, Trump insists that his election challenges are "not over" yet, and believes Biden would be an "illegitimate" president.
  - Brooks outlines to The New York Times his plan to challenge the electoral votes during the January 6 joint session of Congress, specifically targeting the counts of Arizona, Georgia, Nevada, Pennsylvania, and Wisconsin. The Times notes that "no Republican senator has yet stepped forward to say he or she will back such an effort", which would be required to mount such challenges.
- December 14:
  - The electors meet in their respective state capitals (electors for the District of Columbia meet within the district) to formally vote for the president and vice president. Biden officially received 306 total electoral votes and Trump 232, with no faithless electors recorded.
    - Trump supporters protest at various state capitols during the voting. Trump aide Stephen Miller acknowledges on Fox and Friends that "an alternate slate of electors in the contested states [pledged to Trump] is going to vote and we are going to send those results to Congress".
    - The Arizona Republic reports that an Arizona group attempted during the previous week to send counterfeit certificates to the National Archives.
    - Republicans Michigan State Senate Majority Leader Mike Shirkey and House Speaker Lee Chatfield state that the state legislature will comply with the state's certified results giving their electoral votes to Biden.
    - Texas's electors vote 34–4 on a resolution calling for those states legislatures in Georgia, Michigan, Pennsylvania, and Wisconsin to ignore their certified results and appoint their own electors pledged to Trump.
    - Several top Republican senators acknowledge Biden as president-elect after the Electoral College vote.
    - During his Electoral College acceptance speech, Biden blasts Trump's continued refusal to concede.
  - Barr announces that he plans to resign as Attorney General on December 23.
  - The Wisconsin Supreme Court dismisses the Trump campaign's lawsuit seeking to throw out more than 221,000 ballots, ruling that "The Campaign's delay in raising these issues was unreasonable in the extreme".
  - The Trump campaign files a lawsuit in the U.S. District Court for the District of New Mexico, alleging that New Mexico Secretary of State Maggie Toulouse Oliver violated the state's election laws by permitting voters to deposit completed absentee ballots in drop boxes at voting locations rather than handing them to the location's presiding judge in person. The suit seeks to delay in certifying New Mexico's electoral vote, which already occurred earlier in the day, and mandate a statewide canvass of New Mexico's absentee ballots.
  - Raffensperger orders an audit of the voter signatures on the absentee ballots in Cobb County but acknowledges that this will not affect the election outcome.
  - Brooks appears on Lou Dobbs Tonight, calling on other House members to join him in challenging the electoral votes during the January 6 joint session of Congress.
- December 15:
  - McConnell congratulates Biden and Harris during a Senate floor speech, then urges Senate Republicans during a caucus call not to challenge the electoral votes during the January 6 joint session of Congress like Brooks plans to do.
  - While stumping for the Democratic candidates in the January 5 Georgia Senate runoff elections at a rally in Atlanta, Biden mocks the Republican failed efforts to reverse his Georgia win.
  - North Carolina State Senator Bob Steinburg and Virginia State Senator Amanda Chase separately call for Trump to invoke the Insurrection Act of 1807 and declare martial law to overturn the election results.
- December 15–16: Conservative media outlets become divided on whether to now refer to Biden as president-elect. Newsmax announces it will honor the Electoral College vote while One America News Network says there will be "no decision" until the January 6 joint session of Congress.
- December 16:
  - Trump tweets the previous day's Daily Mail article "Trump's allies slam Mitch McConnell for congratulating Biden" and then states. "Mitch, 75,000,000 VOTES, a record for a sitting President (by a lot). Too soon to give up. Republican Party must finally learn to fight. People are angry!"
  - The Senate Homeland Security Committee attempts to hold a hearing on the allegations of voting irregularities but it unfolds into divisive and bitter exchanges along party lines.
  - Senators Ron Johnson of Wisconsin and Mike Lee of Utah state they do not plan to co-sponsor Brooks's challenges to the electoral votes during the January 6 joint session of Congress. Up to this point, Brooks still does not have at least one senator saying publicly that they will support him.
- December 17:
  - Video surfaces of one of the incoming freshmen class members of Congress, senator-elect Tommy Tuberville of Alabama, making comments suggesting that he might back Brooks's challenges to the electoral votes during the January 6 joint session of Congress. Tuberville and his spokesperson do not yet respond to a request for comment.
  - With almost all of the Trump's lawsuits dismissed, Dominion formally sends a letter to Powell demanding that she publicly retract her "defamatory" unproven accusations against their voting machines.
- December 18:
  - Powell files a motion seeking to consolidate four cases that were filed to the U.S. Supreme Court within the past week challenging the election results in Georgia, Michigan, Arizona, and Wisconsin. Two of the four petitions, those for Arizona and Wisconsin, had been rejected on the previous day for errors in the filings. The motion to consolidate describes the rejections as "for reasons unspecified, without participation by any Justice of the Court. Counsel was informed that an explanation would be provided via U.S. Mail." Powell then blames the Supreme Court's clerk for the filing errors and those two petition rejections.
  - During a meeting with advisors, Trump reportedly discusses a proposal to appoint Powell as a special counsel to investigate the allegations of voter fraud. He also reportedly discusses the idea of imposing martial law, but later denies it in a tweet.
- December 20: The Trump campaign files a long-shot appeal to the U.S. Supreme Court seeking to overturn at least three of the Pennsylvania Supreme Court's rulings against them.
- December 21: The NAACP filed an amended complaint against Trump, his presidential campaign and Republican National Committee, accusing defendants of violating the Ku Klux Klan Act, for engaging in a conspiracy to disenfranchise Black voters within the cities with larger Black populations such as Philadelphia, Atlanta, Detroit and Milwaukee.
- December 23: The U.S. Supreme Court sets a deadline of January 22, two days after Biden's inauguration, for Pennsylvania to respond to the Trump campaign's long-shot appeal to overturn the Pennsylvania Supreme Court's rulings.
- December 28:
  - Representative Louie Gohmert of Texas files a lawsuit against Pence, asking a judge to declare that Pence has the "exclusive authority and sole discretion" to decide which electoral votes are counted.
  - The Trump International Hotel in Washington, D.C. unblocks all the rooms they had reserved for Inauguration Week, in a sign that the hotel has accepted Trump's election loss.
- December 29:
  - Raffensperger announces that the audit for Cobb County found no evidence of fraud was found.
  - In a supplemental brief in his long-shot suit to overturn the election, Gohmert states that Pence has refused to go along with his plan and must be forced to do so before January 4.
  - Giuliani files an extremely long-shot suit asking the Supreme Court to overturn the Wisconsin election by January 6.
- December 30:
  - Senator Josh Hawley of Missouri states that he will support the challenges to the electoral votes during the January 6 joint session of Congress, ensuring that both chambers will have to vote to either approve or throw out the results. Pelosi responds by saying that "no doubt" Biden will be declared the winner on January 6.
  - In Gohmert's lawsuit, U.S. District Judge Jeremy Kernodle, of the U.S. District Court for the Eastern District of Texas, sets Pence's counsel's response due date as by 5 p.m. the following day, and Gohmert and the other plaintiffs; reply due date as January 1 by 9 a.m.
  - The Pentagon announces it will resume briefing with Biden's transition team amid dispute after 11 days.
- December 31: Pence and the Department of Justice file complaints asking Gohmert's lawsuit to be thrown out, claiming that it "sued the wrong defendant", and arguing that a ruling in favor of Gohmert would empower Pence and future vice presidents to unilaterally overrule the electoral vote counts.

== January 2021 ==
- January 1:
  - Judge Kernodle throws out Gohmert's case due to lack of jurisdiction, ruling that it could not be brought against only one person since it claims an injury that applies to the entire Congress.
- January 2:
  - The 5th Circuit Court of Appeals throws out Gohmert's appeal, stating that the suit lacks legal standing.
  - Senator Ted Cruz of Texas and ten other Republican senators announce they will also support the challenges to the electoral votes during the January 6 joint session of Congress. With Hawley previous December 30 announcement, this brings the total number of GOP senators challenging Biden's victory to 12. Pence states that he "welcomes [these] efforts of members of the House and Senate ... to raise objections".
  - Senators Mitt Romney of Utah, Pat Toomey of Pennsylvania, Lisa Murkowski of Alaska, and several other Republican senators announce that they will vote to accept the Biden electors. Romney explains that "Were Congress to actually reject state electors, partisans would inevitably demand the same any time their candidate had lost ... Congress, not voters in the respective states, would choose our presidents".
- January 2–3: Trump–Raffensperger scandal: During an hour-long conference call, Trump pressures Raffensperger to look into the president's allegations of voter fraud in Georgia, asking him to "find 11,780 votes, which is one more than [the 11,779 vote margin of defeat] we have, because we won the state". Trump then tweets about the call on the following day, stating that Raffensperger "has no clue!" Raffensperger then tweets back, "Respectfully, President Trump: What you're saying is not true. The truth will come out". Legal analysts believe that Trump's demands during the call might have violated state and federal laws.
- January 3:
  - The new 117th United States Congress convenes. This is the first time such a ceremony took place on a Sunday.
  - Senator Tom Cotton of Arkansas says he will not object to the counting of electoral votes on January 6.
- January 4:
  - Trump holds the final campaign rally of his presidency, ostensibly for the Georgia Senate runoff.
  - Senator Rob Portman of Ohio says he will not object to the counting of electoral votes on January 6.
- January 5:
  - Trump tweets in the morning suggesting that Pence "has the power to reject fraudulently chosen electors", a claim that the Constitution does not explicitly grant the vice president. The New York Times then reports later in the day claiming that Pence had to correct the president during their lunch meeting. Trump then replies in the evening that the Times' report is "fake news" and that "The Vice President and I are in total agreement that the Vice President has the power to act ... [the election] was not in accordance with the Constitution in that they made large scale changes to election rules and regulations as dictated by local judges and politicians, not by state legislators."
  - U.S. District Judge Mark Cohen rejects the Trump campaign's motion to decertify Georgia's election results.
  - With about 140 Republican House members and 13 Senators now publicly supporting the challenges to the electoral votes, Pelosi names Representatives Zoe Lofgren and Adam Schiff of California, Joe Neguse of Colorado, and Jamie Raskin of Maryland to lead the Democrats during the following day's debates.
  - Trump supporters start converging in Washington, D.C. to protest the following day's electoral vote count. Six are arrested during afternoon demonstrations in Freedom Plaza.
- January 6–7: Electoral College vote count and U.S. Capitol attack by supporters of Trump. For more details, see: Timeline of the January 6 United States Capitol attack.
- January 11: With only nine days left in his presidential term, an article of impeachment alleging that Trump incited "lawless action at the Capitol" is introduced to the House of Representatives. The article is introduced with over 200 co-sponsors. The Article also cites the January 2 Trump–Raffensperger phone call.
- January 12: The House passes a resolution calling on Pence and the Cabinet to invoke the 25th Amendment to remove Trump from office. Pence states that he refuses to do so.
- January 13: The House formally votes to impeach Trump, making him the first U.S. president to be impeached twice.
- January 19: Donald Trump's farewell address is delivered as a recorded, online video message from the Blue Room of the White House.
- January 20: Inauguration of Joe Biden as the 46th president of the United States and Kamala Harris as the 49th vice president.

== Candidate participation timeline ==
Candidate announcement and, if applicable, withdrawal dates are as follows:

Political party
Alliance Party
American Solidarity Party
Birthday Party
Bread and Roses Party
Constitution Party
Democratic Party
Green Party
Independent
Libertarian Party
Progressive Party
Prohibition Party
Reform Party
Republican Party
Party for Socialism and Liberation
Socialist Action
Socialist Equality Party
Socialist Workers Party
Veterans Party of America
Exploratory committee
Events
Midterm elections
Iowa caucuses
Super; Tuesday
COVID-19 pandemic emergency declaration
Election; Day
Inauguration; Day
