= Timeline of the 2020 United States presidential election (2017–2019) =

- November 3, 2020

The following is a timeline of major events taking place prior to 2020 United States presidential election, the 59th quadrennial United States presidential election. This timeline includes events from 2017 to 2019. For subsequent events, see Timeline of the 2020 United States presidential election (January–October 2020) and Timeline of the 2020 United States presidential election (November 2020–January 2021).

President Donald Trump of the Republican Party, who was elected in 2016, was seeking reelection to a second term. A total of 29 major candidates declared their candidacies for the Democratic primaries.

Democratic Party ticket

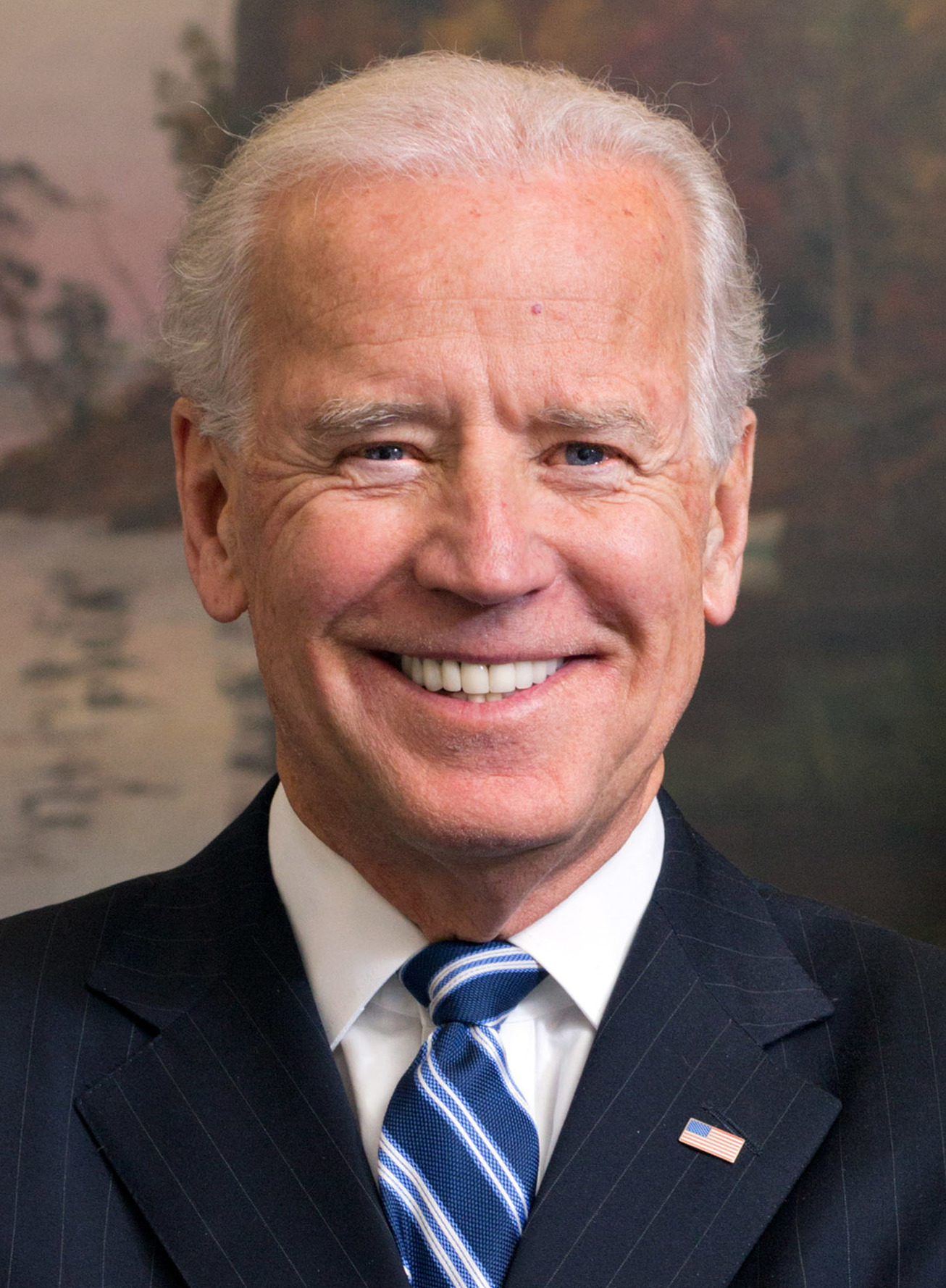
Former Vice President Joe Biden

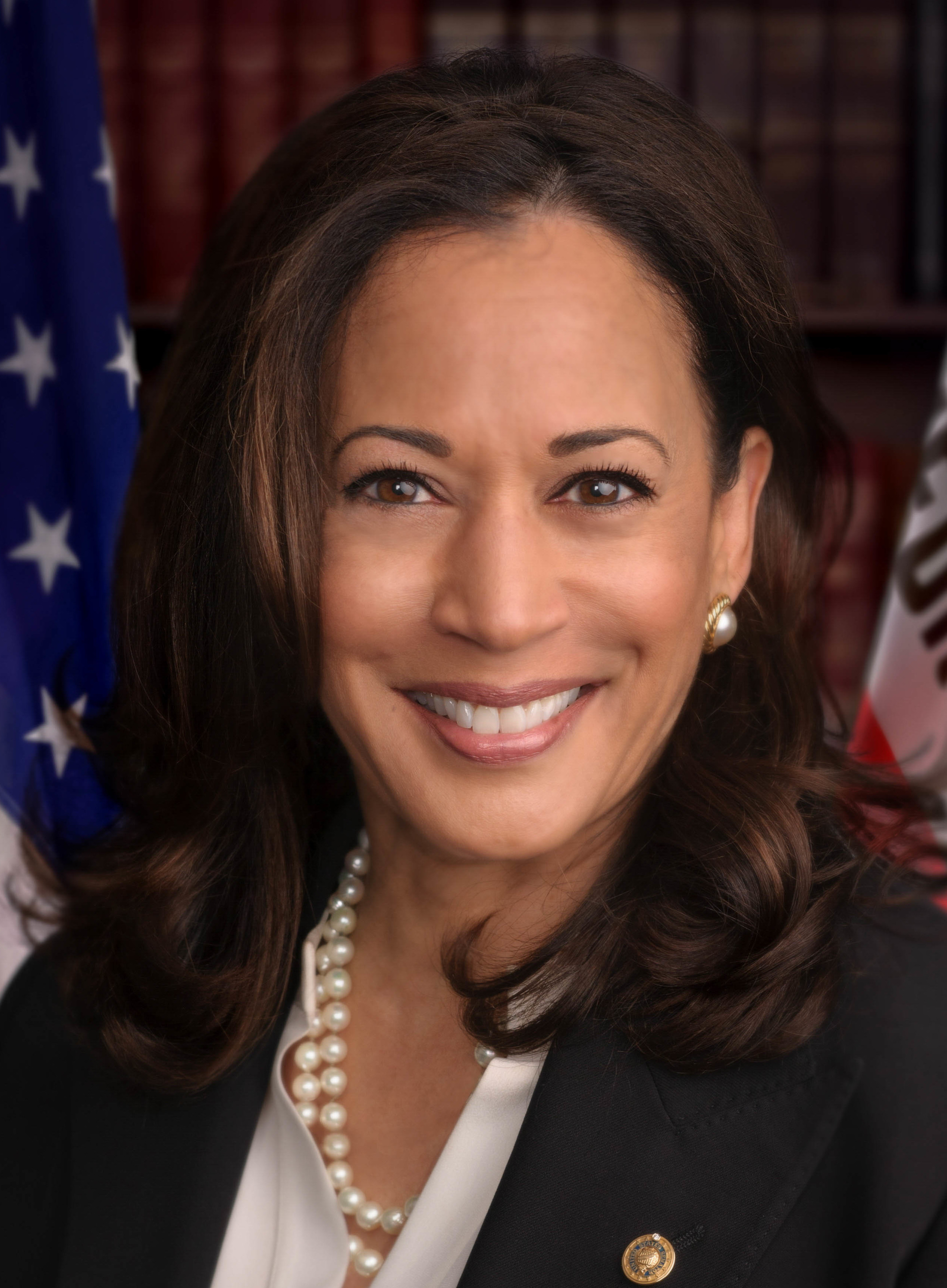
Senator Kamala Harris

Republican Party ticket

President Donald Trump

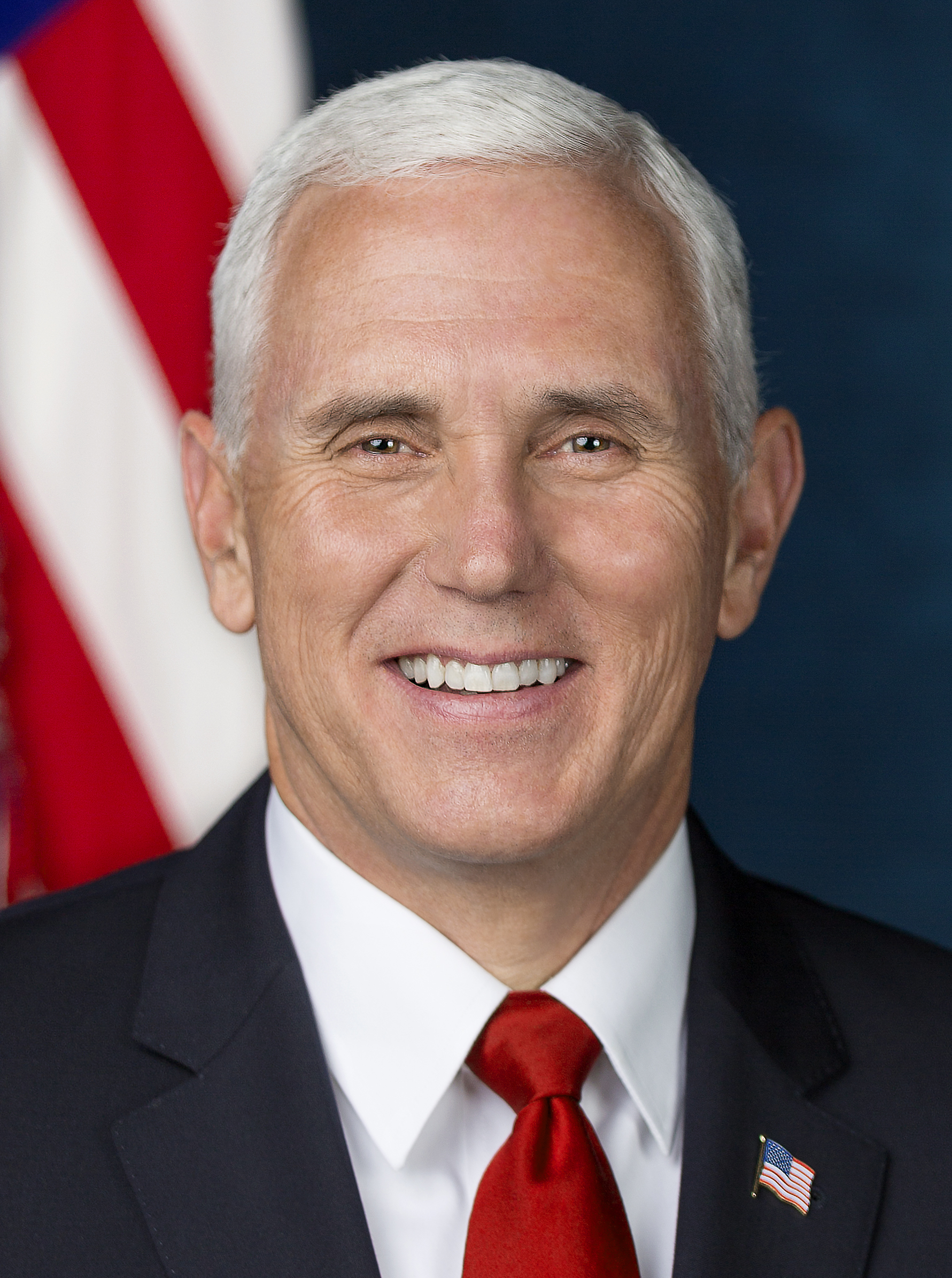
Vice President Mike Pence

== 2017 ==
- February 17: Republican incumbent president Donald Trump informally announces his candidacy for a second term and holds the first of a series of occasional reelection campaign rallies in Melbourne, Florida.
- July 28: Representative John Delaney of Maryland officially announces his candidacy for the nomination of the Democratic Party, breaking the record for the earliest official presidential candidacy declaration in history.
- November 6: Tech entrepreneur Andrew Yang of New York announces his candidacy for the nomination of the Democratic Party.

== 2018 ==
- January 16: Anti-war activist Adam Kokesh announces his candidacy for the nomination of the Libertarian Party. Hours after the announcement, he was pulled over twice and subsequently arrested on possession-related charges.
- May 3: The Republican National Committee eliminates their debate committee for the 2020 election cycle, signaling that they do not plan to sanction any debates between Trump and possible primary challengers.
- July 3: Former Libertarian National Committee vice-chair Arvin Vohra announces his candidacy for the nomination of the Libertarian Party.
- July 18: Charlotte, North Carolina is chosen as the host city of the 2020 Republican National Convention
- August 25: Democratic Party officials and television networks begin discussions as to the nature and scheduling of the following year's debates and the nomination process. Changes were made to the role of superdelegates, deciding to only allow them to vote on the first ballot if the nomination is uncontested
- November 6: In the midterm elections, the Democrats capture control of the U.S. House of Representatives with a net gain of 41 seats. The Republicans hold their majority in the U.S. Senate with a net gain of two seats.
- November 7: President Trump confirms that Mike Pence will remain vice presidential pick
- November 11: West Virginia state senator Richard Ojeda announces candidacy for the nomination of the Democratic Party. He ultimately would become the first candidate to withdraw from the race, suspending his campaign on January 25, 2019, more than a year before the Iowa caucus (see below).
- December 12: Former secretary of housing and urban development Julian Castro forms a presidential exploratory committee for a possible run for the nomination of the Democratic Party
- December 31: Senator Elizabeth Warren of Massachusetts forms an exploratory committee for a possible run for the nomination of the Democratic Party. She would ultimately decide to commit to an official campaign in February 2019 (see below).

== 2019 ==
=== January 2019 ===
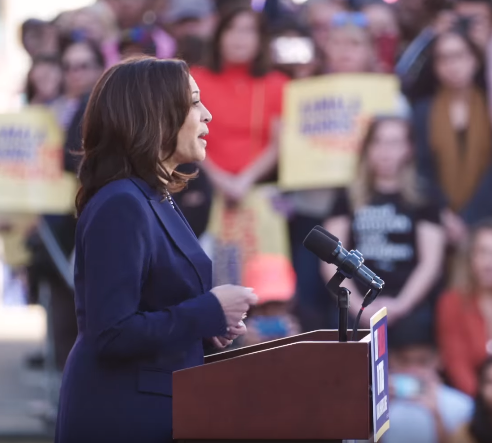
Kamala Harris launched her campaign on January 21, 2019

- January 11: Representative Tulsi Gabbard of Hawaii announces she has decided to run for the nomination of the Democratic Party
- January 12: Former secretary of housing and urban development Julian Castro officially announces his candidacy for the nomination of the Democratic Party
- January 15: Senator Kirsten Gillibrand of New York announces the formation of an exploratory committee for a possible run for the nomination of the Democratic Party. She would then launch an official campaign in March (see below).
- January 21: Senator Kamala Harris of California officially announces her candidacy for the nomination of the Democratic Party
- January 23: Mayor of South Bend, Indiana, Pete Buttigieg announces the formation of an exploratory committee for a possible run for the nomination of the Democratic Party
- January 25:
  - Ojeda drops out of the Democratic nomination race, saying that he has little chance of success.
  - The Republican National Committee unofficially endorses Trump.
- January 27: Starbucks founder Howard Schultz announces possible independent presidential bid, which is followed by a furious backlash on social media
- January 28: Spiritual teacher and author Marianne Williamson of California announces her candidacy for the nomination of the Democratic Party.

=== February 2019 ===
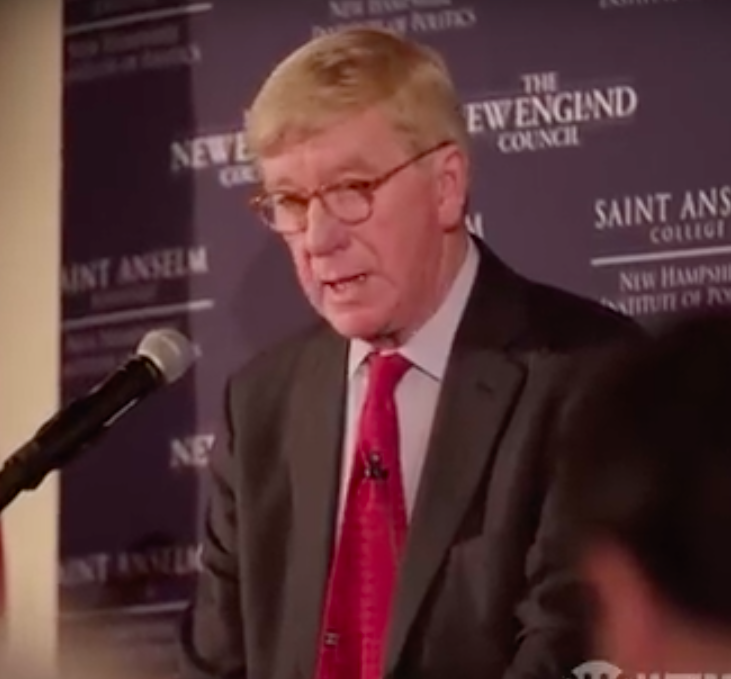
Bill Weld announcing the formation of an exploratory committee on February 15, 2019, becoming Trump's first official Republican challenger

- February 1: On Twitter, Senator Cory Booker of New Jersey announces his candidacy for the nomination of the Democratic Party
- February 9: Senator Elizabeth Warren of Massachusetts announces her candidacy for the nomination of the Democratic Party, soon after forming an exploratory committee.
- February 10: Senator Amy Klobuchar of Minnesota announces her candidacy for the nomination of the Democratic Party
- February 12: The first mass-rally of the Trump campaign of the year takes place in El Paso, Texas. A counter-rally led by former Democratic U.S. representative Beto O'Rourke of Texas takes place less than a mile away. O’Rourke would later enter the race in March for the Democratic nomination (see below).
- February 13–15: Winter meeting of the Democratic National Committee, in which the rules of the upcoming primary are promulgated
- February 15: Former Massachusetts governor Bill Weld announces the formation of an exploratory committee, becoming Trump's first official challenger in the Republican primaries
- February 18: Youngstown Board of Education member Dario Hunter announces his candidacy for the nomination of the Green Party.
- February 19: Senator Bernie Sanders of Vermont announces his candidacy for the nomination of the Democratic Party.

=== March 2019 ===
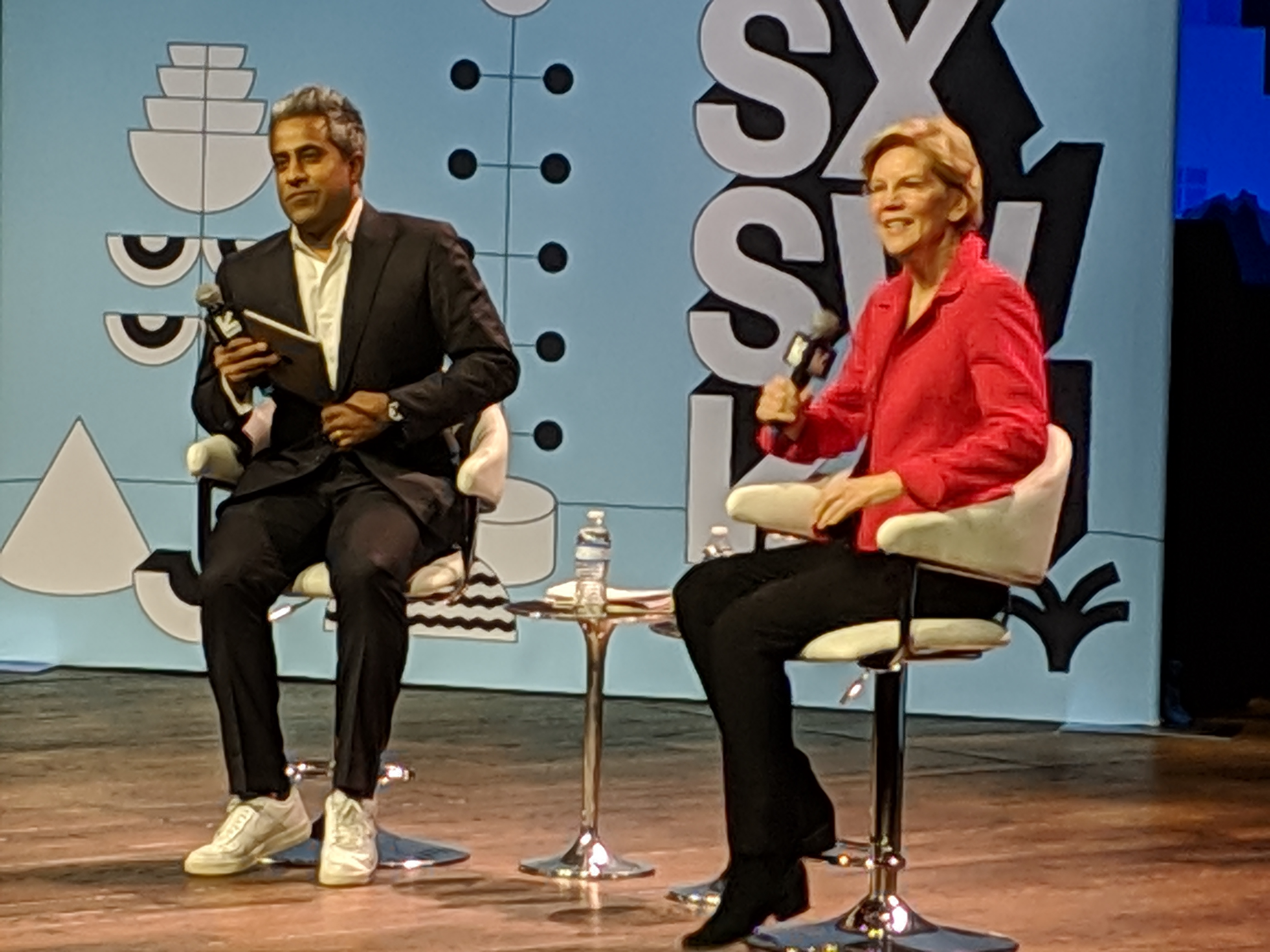
Elizabeth Warren (right) being interviewed by Anand Giridharadas at South by Southwest, March 2019

- March 1: Governor Jay Inslee of Washington announces his candidacy for the nomination of the Democratic Party
- March 4: Former governor John Hickenlooper of Colorado announces his candidacy for the nomination of the Democratic Party
- March 5: Former mayor Michael Bloomberg of New York City announces that, after exploring the possibility, he will not run for president in 2020.
- March 10: Presidential Forum at South by Southwest, the first so-called "cattle call" event of the cycle.
- March 11: Milwaukee, Wisconsin is chosen as the host city of the 2020 Democratic National Convention, beating out Miami, Florida and Houston, Texas.
- March 13: Wayne Messam, the Democratic mayor of Miramar, Florida, announces the formation of an exploratory committee
- March 14: O'Rourke officially announces his candidacy for the nomination of the Democratic Party
- March 17: Gillibrand officially announces her candidacy for the nomination of the Democratic Party, having previously formed an exploratory committee two month earlier (see above).
- March 28: Messam formally announces his candidacy for the nomination of the Democratic Party.
- March 30: Castro, Delaney, Klobuchar, Ryan, and Warren appear at the Heartland Forum at Buena Vista University in Storm Lake, Iowa, discussing issues affecting rural Americans.

=== April 2019 ===
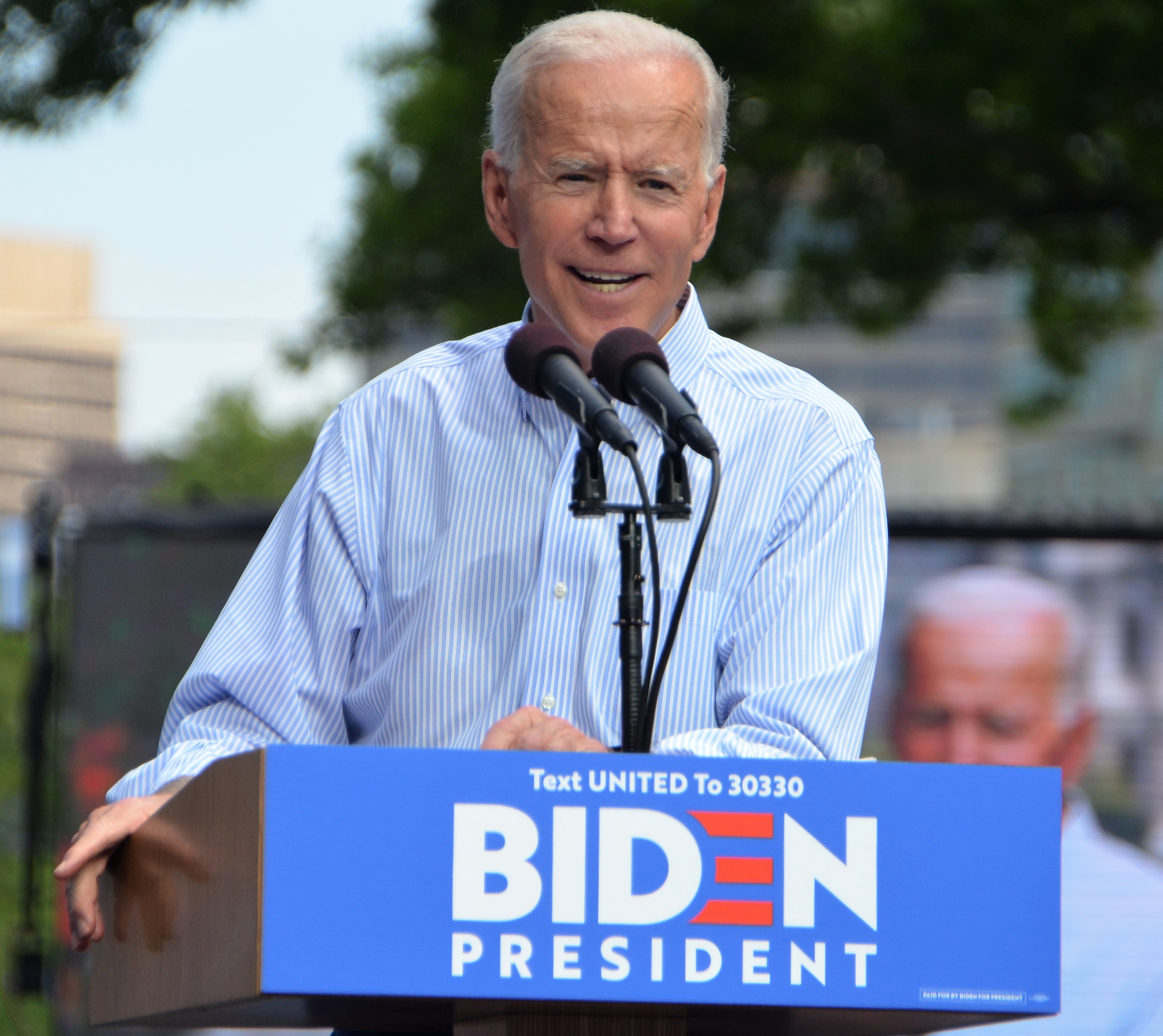
Joe Biden launched his campaign on April 25, 2019, increasing the number of major Democratic candidates to 20

- April 1 : Eight Democratic candidates attend the We the People Membership Summit at the Warner Theatre in Washington, D.C., discussing Democracy reform.
- April 3–5: National Action Network convention. The second so-called "cattle call" event of the campaign. Twelve candidates show up and speak.
- April 4: Representative Tim Ryan of Ohio announces his candidacy for the Democratic Party nomination.
- April 8:
  - Senator Mike Gravel of Alaska announces his candidacy for the Democratic Party nomination.
  - Representative Eric Swalwell of California announces his candidacy for the Democratic Party nomination.
- April 14: Buttigieg officially announces his candidacy for the Democratic Party nomination, having previously formed an exploratory committee earlier in January (see above).
- April 15: Weld officially announces his candidacy for the Republican Party nomination, having previously formed an exploratory committee earlier in February (see above).
- April 22: Representative Seth Moulton of Massachusetts announces his candidacy for the Democratic Party nomination.
- April 24: Eight Democratic candidates attend the She the People Presidential Forum at Texas Southern University in Houston, Texas, discussing issues affecting women of color.
- April 25: Former vice president Joe Biden announces his candidacy for the Democratic Party nomination. He becomes the 20th major Democratic candidate to enter the race.
- April 27: Several Democratic candidates attend the National Forum on Wages and Working People at Enclave in Las Vegas, Nevada, discussing economic issues affecting low-income Americans.

=== May 2019 ===
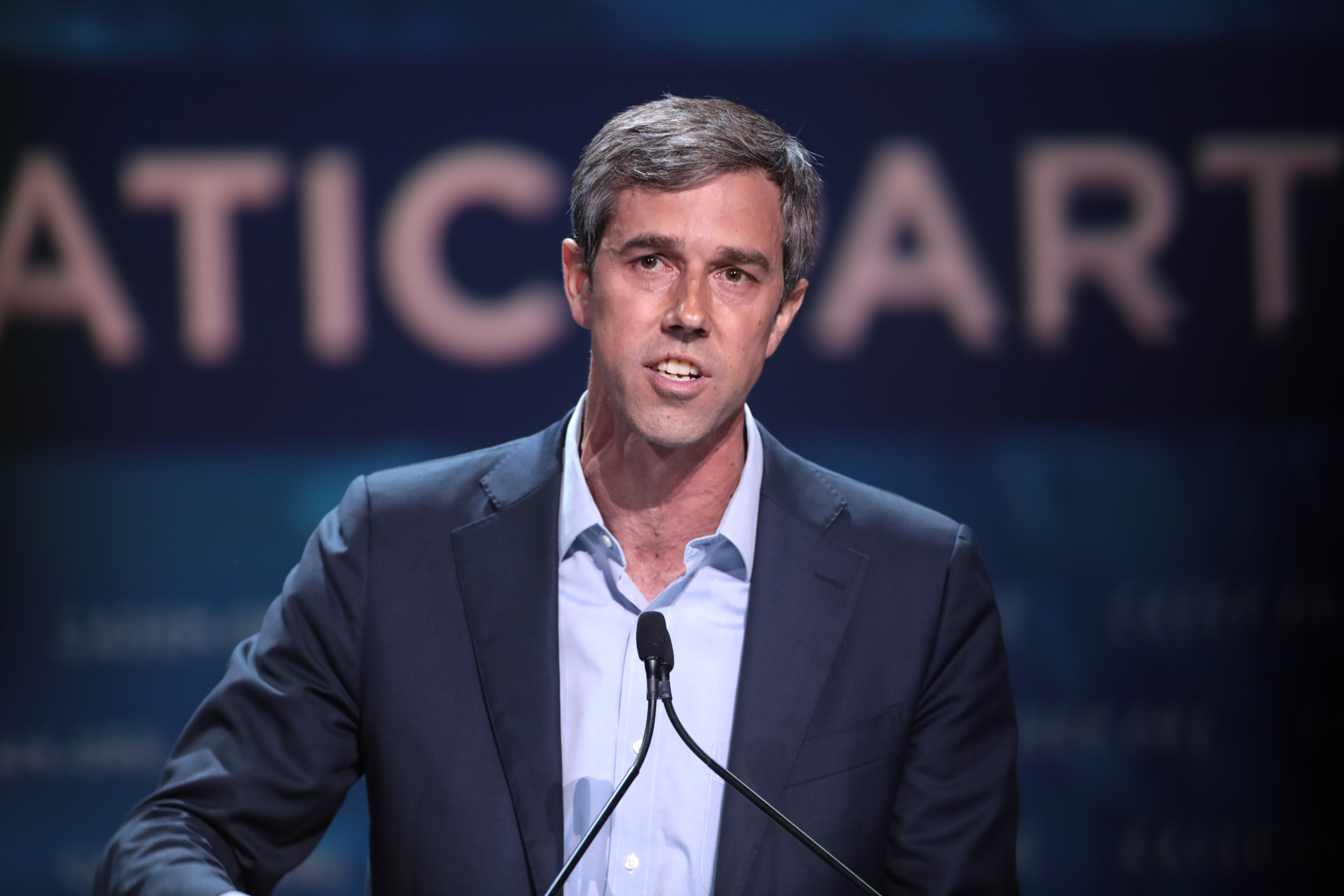
Beto O'Rourke speaking at the 2019 California State Democratic Convention, held from May 31 to June 2

- May 2: Senator Michael Bennet of Colorado announces his candidacy for the nomination of the Democratic Party
- May 13: John Durham, U.S. Attorney for the District of Connecticut, is appointed to oversee a Department of Justice probe into the origins of the FBI investigation into Russian interference.
- May 14: Governor Steve Bullock of Montana announces his candidacy for the nomination of the Democratic Party.
- May 16:
  - New York City Mayor Bill de Blasio announces his candidacy for the nomination of the Democratic Party.
  - Businessman and perennial candidate Rocky De La Fuente announces his candidacy for the nomination of the Republican Party.
- May 28: Green Party co-founder Howie Hawkins announces his candidacy for the nomination of the Green Party.
- May 31: Castro, Inslee, Harris, and Sanders discuss immigration reform at the Unity and Freedom Forum at the Hilton Pasadena, in Pasadena, California.
- May 31-June 2: California State Democratic Convention, a major "cattle call" event attended by most major candidates. Joe Biden is a no-show at the event, attending a Human Rights Campaign event in Ohio at the same time.

=== June 2019 ===
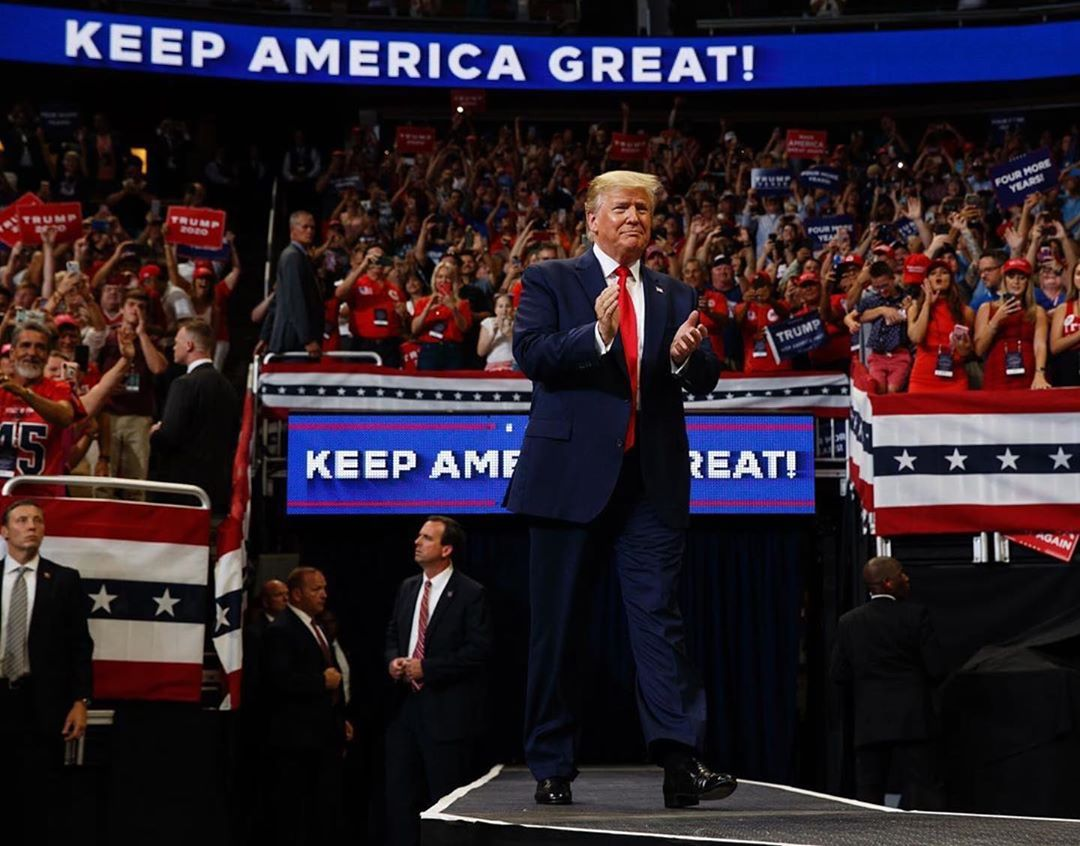
Donald Trump officially kicking-off his re-election campaign in Orlando, Florida on June 18, 2019

- June 1: Several Democratic candidates attend the Big Ideas Forum at Warfield Theatre in San Francisco, California.
- June 5: Iowa Democrats' Hall of Fame Dinner: an event featuring 19 candidates. Due to his granddaughter's high school graduation, Biden is absent.
- June 13: The Democratic National Committee announces that 20 candidates will participate in the first official Democratic debate on June 26–27.
- June 15: Several Democratic candidates attend the Presidential Candidates Forum at Charleston Music Hall in Charleston, South Carolina, televised on a tape delay on BET.
- June 17: Ten Democratic candidates discuss issues affecting low-income Americans at the Poor People's Campaign Presidential Forum at Trinity Washington University in Washington, D.C.
- June 18: Trump holds "kickoff" rally in Orlando, Florida.
- June 21: Issues affecting Hispanic and Latino Americans are discussed by eight Democratic candidates at the NALEO Presidential Candidate Forum at Telemundo Center in Miami, Florida.
- June 22:
  - Democratic candidates make seven-minute speeches at the South Carolina Democratic Party Convention at the Columbia Convention Center in Columbia, South Carolina.
  - Several Democratic candidates discuss abortion and reproductive health care issues at The We Decide: 2020 Election Membership Forum at the University of South Carolina in Columbia, South Carolina.
- June 23: Former representative Joe Sestak of Pennsylvania announces his candidacy for the Democratic Party nomination. Sestak cited his daughter's fight with brain cancer as his reason for his delayed June announcement.
- June 26–27: The Democratic debate series commences with a two-night debate at the Adrienne Arsht Center in downtown Miami, hosted by NBC and broadcast on its networks.
- June 30: New Hampshire state representative Max Abramson announces his candidacy for the nomination of the Libertarian Party.

=== July 2019 ===
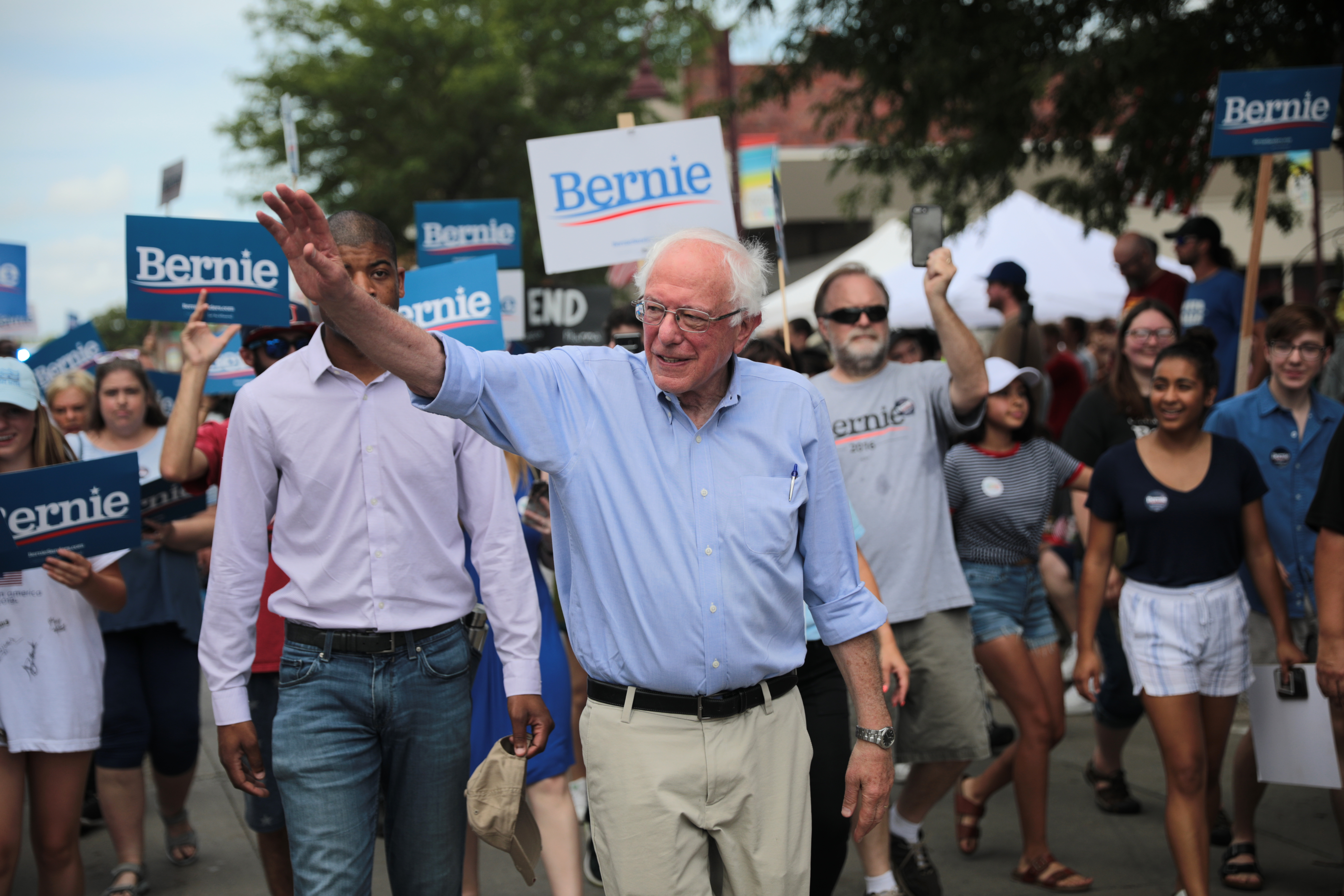
Bernie Sanders campaigning at the Ames, Iowa July 4 parade, 2019

- July 5: Issues affecting public schools are discussed by Democratic candidates at the Strong Public Schools Presidential Forum at the George R. Brown Convention Center in Houston, Texas.
- July 8: Swalwell becomes the second candidate, after Ojeda on January 25, to drop out of the Democratic nomination race. Swalwell says that he wanted to narrow the crowded Democratic field after he felt that he did not have a path to winning it himself.
- July 9: Hedge fund manager Tom Steyer of California announces his candidacy for the nomination of the Democratic Party.
- July 11: Issues affecting Hispanic and Latino Americans are discussed by Democratic candidates at the League of United Latin American Citizens (LULAC) Presidential Candidates Forum at the Wisconsin Center in Milwaukee, Wisconsin.
- July 11–13: Castro, Gillibrand, Inslee, and Warren make appearances at the Netroots Nation at the Pennsylvania Convention Center Philadelphia, Pennsylvania by the Netroots Foundation.
- July 15–20: Twenty Democratic candidates make appearances at the Iowa Presidential Candidate Forums in Des Moines, Davenport, Cedar Rapids, Sioux City, and Council Bluffs.
- July 18: CNN announces the lineup for the second Democratic debate to be held July 30–31.
- July 24: Ten Democratic candidates appear at the 2020 Presidential Candidates Forum in Detroit, Michigan.
- July 30: Democratic governor Gavin Newsom of California signs a bill into state law requiring presidential candidates to release their tax returns for the past five years in order to qualify for the California primary ballot. It is intended to force President Trump to reveal his taxes, which he has refused to do since his 2016 campaign. Republicans view this as unconstitutional, claiming that a state cannot mandate additional eligibility requirements for the presidency beyond what is stated in Article Two of the US Constitution.
- July 30–31: The second Democratic debate commences with a two-night debate at the Fox Theatre in Detroit, airing on CNN.

=== August 2019 ===
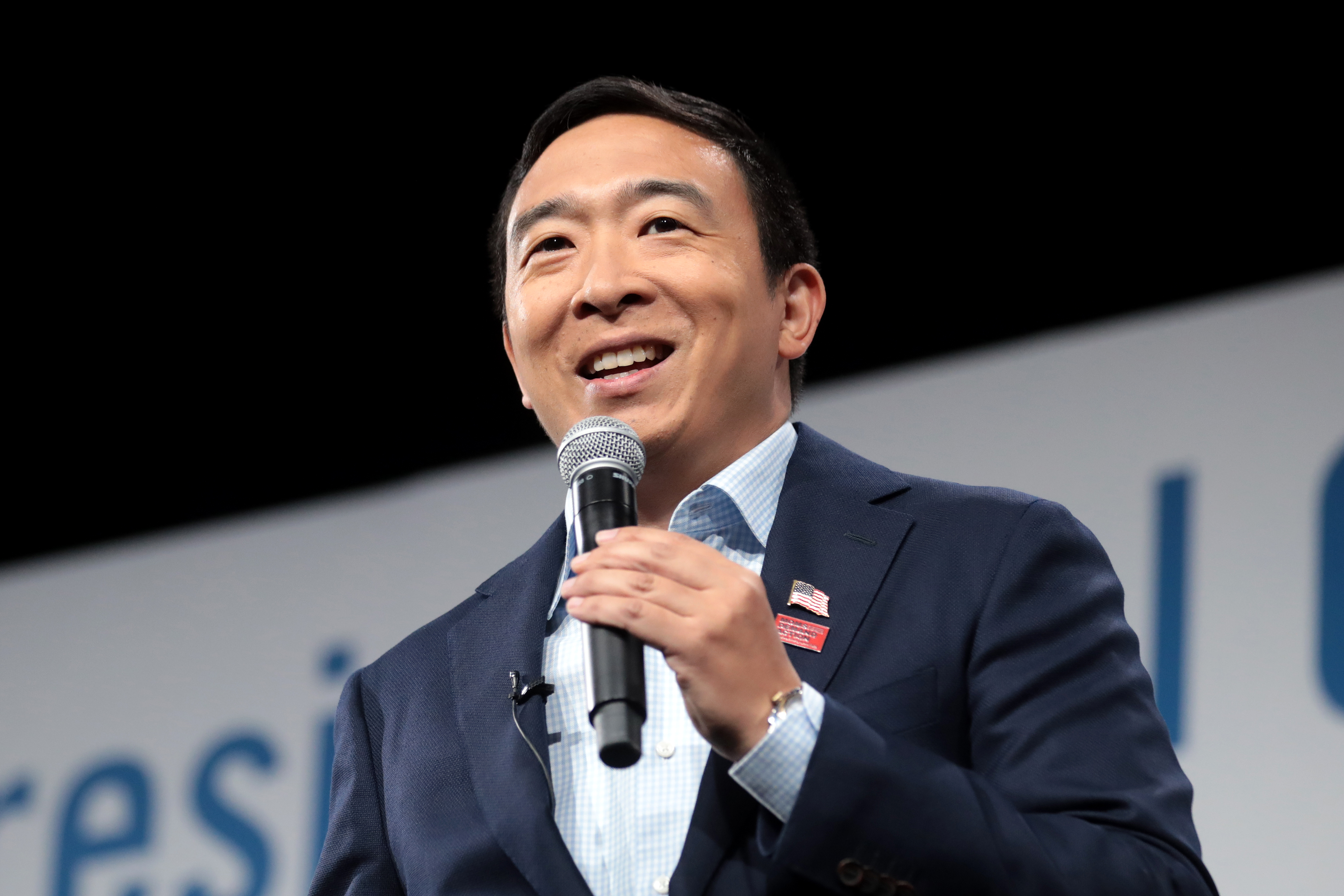
Andrew Yang at the Presidential Gun Sense Forum on August 10, 2019

- August 1: Gravel becomes the third candidate to drop out of the Democratic nomination race, citing a failure to qualify for either Democratic debates.
- August 3: Nineteen Democratic candidates attend the Public Service Forum at the University of Nevada, Las Vegas.
- August 5–6: Lawsuits are filled to challenge California's new law that will prevent President Trump from appearing on the state's primary ballot unless he releases his tax returns. The first lawsuit is filled by the conservative activist group Judicial Watch on behalf of four California voters. Additional lawsuits are filed on August 6 by the Trump campaign, the Republican National Committee, and the California Republican Party.
- August 8–18: The Iowa State Fair takes place, and is attended by at least twenty of the candidates.
- August 10: Seventeen Democratic candidates discuss gun issues at the Gun Sense Forum in Des Moines, Iowa.
- August 15: Hickenlooper becomes the fourth candidate to drop out of the Democratic nomination race. His campaign cites low poll numbers, lack of donors, a large turnover of campaign staff in July, and the likelihood of not qualifying for the third Democratic debate in September.
- August 19: In the Iowa State Fair Straw Poll, Biden edged Warren by 10 votes among Democratic primary candidates, while Trump won at least 96 percent of the vote among Republican primary candidates.
- August 19–20: Democratic candidates discuss issues affecting Native Americans at the Frank LaMere Native American Presidential Forum at Orpheum Theater in Sioux City, Iowa.
- August 21: Inslee becomes the fifth candidate to drop out of the Democratic nomination race. Unlikely to qualify for the third Democratic debate in September, he decides to instead run for another term as governor of Washington.
- August 23: Moulton becomes the sixth candidate to drop out of the Democratic primary. Never able to gather enough fundraising or to register in the polls, he decides to instead run for another term in the House of Representatives.
- August 25: Former congressman Joe Walsh from Illinois announces his candidacy for the Republican Party nomination, becoming Trump's second official primary challenger after Weld.
- August 28:
  - Gillibrand becomes the seventh candidate to drop out of the Democratic primary, citing her inability to qualify for the third Democratic debate in September.
  - Only 10 candidates qualify for the third Democratic debate. Both Gabbard and Steyer criticize its stricter polling criteria that led to their disqualification.
- August 31: Due to security concerns, the Democratic National Committee orders both the Iowa and Nevada Democratic state parties to scrap their plans for "virtual caucuses", which would have allowed those unable to physically attend the Iowa or Nevada Democratic caucuses to participate online or by teleconference.

=== September 2019 ===
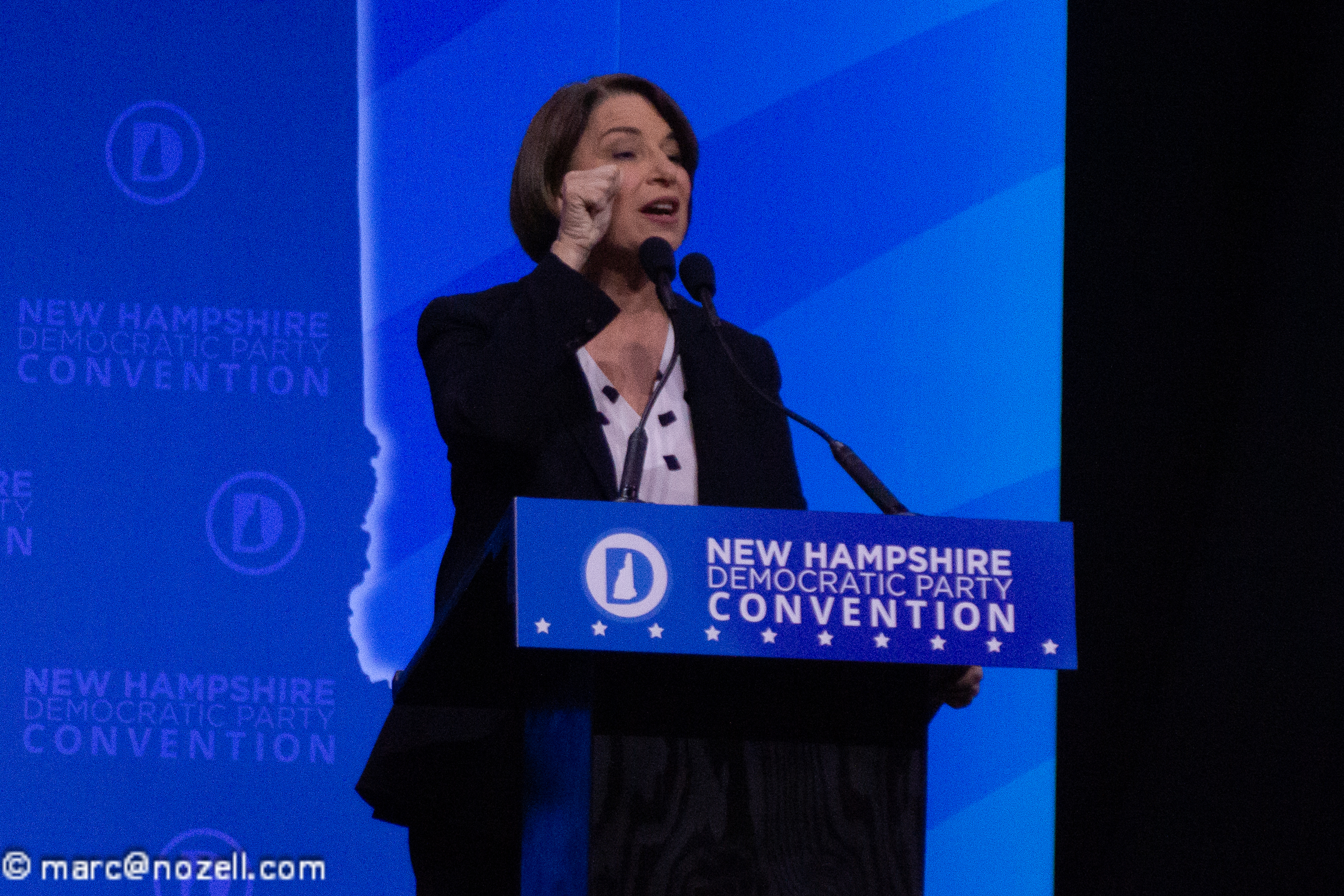
Amy Klobuchar speaking at the New Hampshire Democratic state convention on September 7, 2019

- September 4: CNN holds and broadcasts a live seven-hour Climate Crisis Town Hall from New York City with the 10 candidates who qualified for the third Democratic debate, who appear one-at-a-time for roughly 40 minutes each.
- September 6: Schultz announces that he will instead not seek an independent presidential bid.
- September 7:
  - Kansas, Nevada, and South Carolina Republican state committees vote to cancel their respective primary/caucuses. Both of Trump's major challengers, Walsh and Weld, criticize the move.
  - Nineteen Democratic candidates appear at the New Hampshire Democratic state convention.
- September 8:
  - Former South Carolina governor and congressman Mark Sanford announces his candidacy for the Republican Party nomination, becoming Trump's third official primary challenger.
  - Gabbard, Steyer, and Yang attend the Asian American Pacific Islanders Progressive Democratic Presidential Forum at the Segerstrom Center for the Arts in Costa Mesa, California.
- September 9: The Arizona Republican Party officially notifies Arizona secretary of state Katie Hobbs that they will scrap the Arizona Republican primary.
- September 12: The third Democratic debate takes place at H&PE Arena on the campus of Texas Southern University in Houston, airing on ABC and Univision.
- September 17: Six Democratic candidates appear at the Workers' Presidential Summit at the Pennsylvania Convention Center in Philadelphia.
- September 19–20: A Climate Forum, sponsored by MSNBC, takes place at Gaston Hall on the campus of Georgetown University in Washington, D.C.
- September 20:
  - de Blasio becomes the eighth candidate to drop out of the Democratic primary, admitting that he had no chance of winning the nomination.
  - Ten Democratic candidates appear at the LGBTQ Forum on the campus of Coe College in Cedar Rapids, Iowa.
- September 21:
  - Buttigieg, Castro, Sanders, and Warren appear at the Iowa People's Presidential Forum at the Iowa Events Center in Des Moines, Iowa.
  - The Alaska Republican Party officially scraps its state's Republican primary, stating it "would serve no useful purpose" because Trump is the incumbent president.
- September 22: Six Democratic candidates appear at the Youth Forum at Roosevelt High School in Des Moines, Iowa.
- September 24:
  - Nancy Pelosi, the speaker of the House of Representatives, announces the start of a formal impeachment inquiry against Trump.
  - Business Insider hosts a non-RNC-sanctioned debate between Walsh and Weld, streamed live on both their website and their Facebook Watch show Business Insider Today. Sanford and Trump decline to participate.

=== October 2019 ===
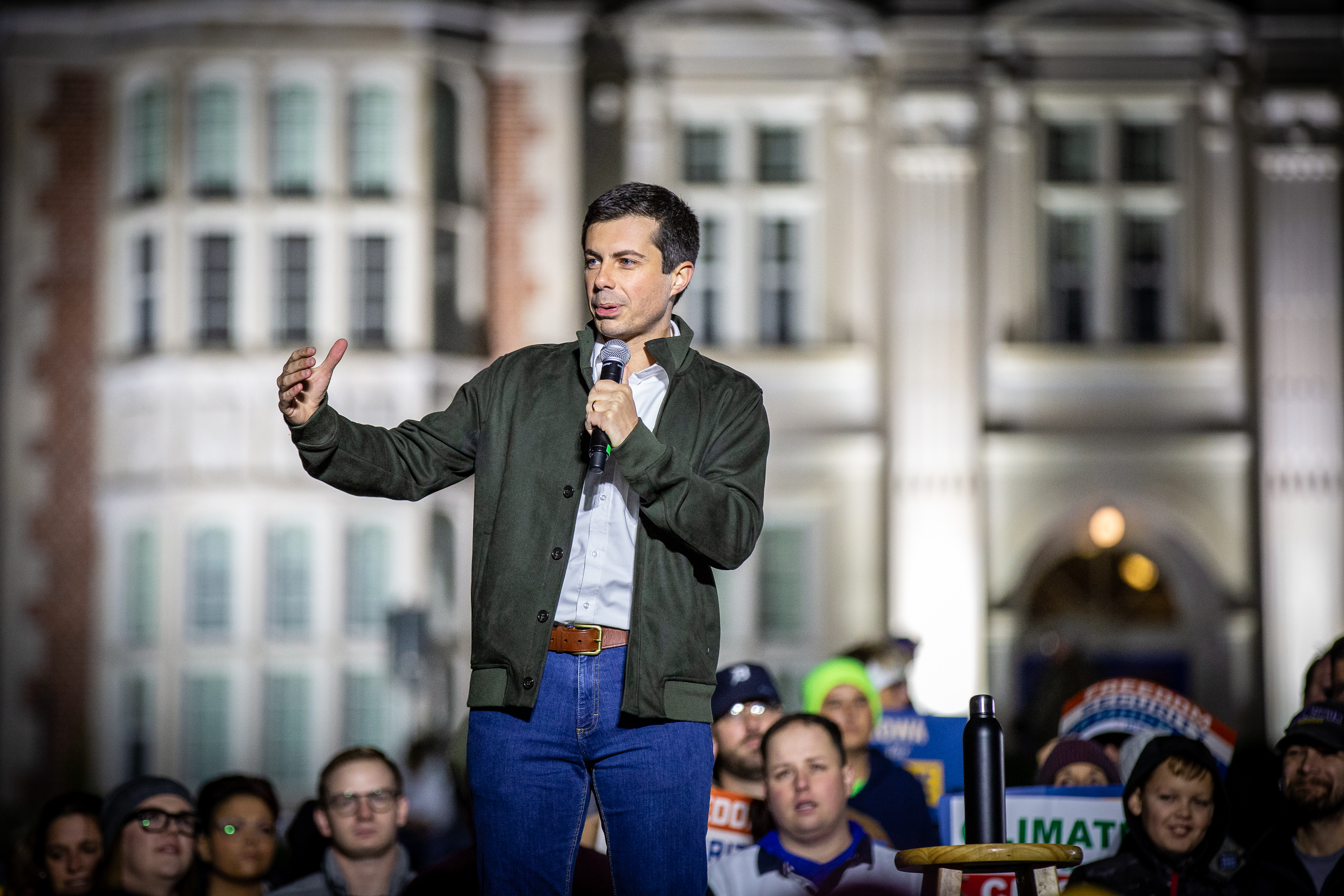
Pete Buttigieg at a town hall at Roosevelt High School in Des Moines, Iowa on October 12, 2019

- October 1: Twelve candidates qualify for the fourth Democratic debate.
- October 2:
  - Sanders undergoes an unexpected heart surgery to treat a blocked artery, postponing his campaign events for at least a few days.
  - Nine Democratic candidates appear at the Gun Safety Forum in Las Vegas, Nevada
- October 10: Nine Democratic candidates appear at the LGBTQ Forum in Los Angeles, California
- October 15: The fourth Democratic debate takes place at Otterbein University in Westerville, Ohio.
- October 24: Ryan becomes the ninth candidate to drop out of the Democratic primary, deciding to instead run for another term as House representative of Ohio.
- October 25–27: At Benedict College in Columbia, South Carolina, the 20/20 Bipartisan Justice Center gives Trump an award for criminal justice reform. This causes Harris and several other Democratic candidates to threaten to boycott the Second Step Presidential Justice Forum, also being held at Benedict. Harris and the others then agree to rejoin the event after the 20/20 Bipartisan Justice Center removes its sponsorship of the forum.
- October 26:
  - Sanford, Walsh, and Weld appear at Politicon 2019 in Nashville, Tennessee.
  - Several Democratic candidates appear at the People's Presidential Forum Nevada in Las Vegas, Nevada.
- October 28: Forbes sponsors a non-RNC-sanctioned debate between Sanford, Walsh, and Weld at the Masonic Temple in Detroit, Michigan.
- October 31:
  - The House of Representatives votes to establish procedures for public hearings in the Trump impeachment inquiry, with two Democrats and all Republicans voting against the measure.
  - The Minnesota Republican Party submits its "determination of candidates" for its primary ballot to the Minnesota secretary of state, listing only Trump. Sanford and Walsh criticize the move for their exclusion from the Minnesota ballot. Minnesota Republican state party chairwoman Jennifer Carnahan claims that Trump was the only campaign to contact the state party for filing.

=== November 2019 ===
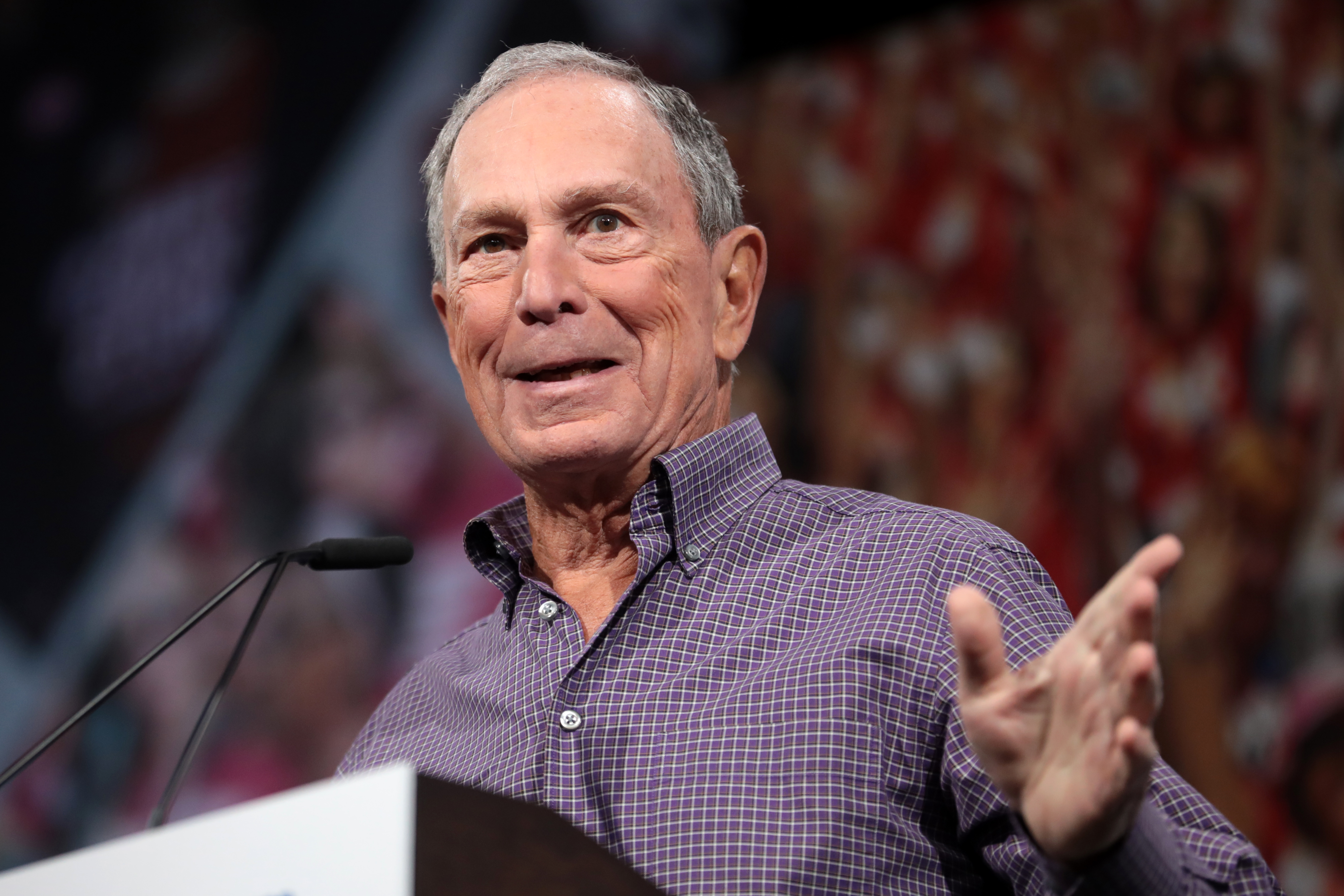
Michael Bloomberg officially launched his campaign on November 24, 2019

- November 1:
  - O'Rourke becomes the tenth candidate to drop out of the Democratic primary, saying that he could not raise enough money to stay competitive in the race.
  - Several Democratic candidates appear at the Iowa Democratic Party's Liberty and Justice Celebration in Des Moines.
- November 3: Delaney, Gabbard, Williamson, and Weld appear at the non-partisan group No Labels's Problem Solver Convention in Manchester, New Hampshire.
- November 8:
  - Former New York City mayor Michael Bloomberg files at the deadline to qualify for the Alabama Democratic primary, even though he is still thinking about officially entering the nationwide race.
  - Six Democratic candidates appear at the Environmental Justice Forum on the campus of South Carolina State University in Orangeburg, South Carolina.
- November 12: Sanford becomes the first major candidate to drop out of the Republican primary, blaming the Trump impeachment inquiry for making it impossible to raise other issues in the debate.
- November 13, 15, 19–21: The House Intelligence Committee holds public investigative hearings in the Trump impeachment inquiry.
- November 13: Ten candidates qualify for the fifth Democratic debate.
- November 14: Former Massachusetts governor Deval Patrick announces his candidacy for the Democratic Party nomination, hours before filing for the New Hampshire primary.
- November 16: Eight Democratic candidates appear at the California Democratic Party's Fall Endorsing Convention at the Long Beach Convention and Entertainment Center in Long Beach, California.
- November 17:
  - The first case of coronavirus disease 2019 (COVID-19) is believed to have been contracted by a human being: a 55-year-old from Hubei province in China.
  - Fourteen Democratic candidates appear at the Nevada Democratic Party's First in the West event at the Bellagio resort on the Las Vegas Strip.
- November 20:
  - The fifth Democratic debate takes place at Tyler Perry Studios in Atlanta.
  - Messam becomes the eleventh candidate to drop out of the Democratic primary, citing poor poll numbers and inability to break through with voters.
- November 21:
  - Bloomberg announces the formation of an exploratory committee.
  - The California Supreme Court unanimously strikes down the July 30 state law that required presidential candidates to release their tax returns in order to qualify for the California primary ballot.
- November 24: Bloomberg officially enters the Democratic primary race. Because of his late entry, he decides to skip the first four contests (Iowa, New Hampshire, Nevada and South Carolina) and instead starts aiming at those states holding primaries next on the schedule on Super Tuesday, March 3.

=== December 2019 ===
The House of Representatives votes on the two articles to impeach Trump, cementing it as a major issue in the 2020 elections

- December 1: Sestak drops out of the Democratic primary, conceding that he could not gain traction after his relatively late entry into the contest.
- December 2: Bullock drops out of the Democratic primary, after struggling to gain enough money or garner enough support.
- December 3: Harris drops out of the Democratic primary, with her campaign running low on cash.
- December 7: Several Democratic candidates appear at the Teamsters Union Forum in Cedar Rapids, Iowa.
- December 10–13: The House Judiciary Committee unveils, holds hearings, and votes along party lines to send two articles of impeachment against Trump to the full House.
- December 11: The Hawaii Republican Party officially scraps its state's Republican caucus, declaring Trump the winner by default, after he is the only candidate to declare for its ballot by the December 2 deadline. Because this is the first of the cancelled Republican state races that directly binds its delegates to the national convention (as opposed to a walking subcaucus-type system), Trump automatically is awarded his first pledged delegates of the nomination campaign.
- December 12: With the prospect of a Senate impeachment trial conflicting with the Democratic debate in January, the Democratic National Committee announces that they will work with the candidates to evaluate its options if they need to reschedule.
- December 13–17: After seven candidates qualify for the sixth Democratic debate, they all announce they will boycott it if an ongoing worker strike at its Loyola Marymount University venue in Los Angeles remains unresolved. This labor dispute is then resolved four days later, allowing the debate to proceed.
- December 14: Six Democratic candidates appear at the Public Education Forum in Pittsburgh, Pennsylvania.
- December 16: Gabbard, Patrick, Walsh, and Weld discuss mental health issues at the Unite for Mental Health: New Hampshire Town Hall in Manchester, New Hampshire.
- December 18: The full House of Representatives formally votes along party lines to impeach Trump. Gabbard, in her capacity as a House representative of Hawaii, is the lone congressperson to vote "present". A defiant Trump rallies supporters in Battle Creek, Michigan.
- December 19: The sixth Democratic debate takes place on the campus of Loyola Marymount University in Los Angeles.

== The primary and General Election campaigns ==
There are three main parts to every election year. The primaries, where delegates to the party's quadrennial convention are selected, the conventions themselves, and the Fall General election.

== Post-election litigation and presidential transition ==
The election was held on November 3, followed by a period of election litigation and attempts to overturn the election by the Trump campaign. There were 6 states targeted for voter fraud lawsuits: Arizona, Georgia, Michigan, Nevada, Pennsylvania, and Wisconsin, all battleground states in the 2020 presidential election.

Out of 55 cases, 14 were dropped, 30 were dismissed, 6 ruled against, and 5 pending ongoing trial or appeal.

=== Texas v. Pennsylvania ===
On December 8, 2020, Texas Attorney General Ken Paxton sued the states of Georgia, Michigan, Pennsylvania, and Wisconsin in order to invalidate the results of the presidential election in those states. The lawsuit was filed with the U.S. Supreme Court due to their jurisdiction over state disputes. Donald Trump referred to this case at "the big one" and 100 Republican representatives supported Texas. However, due to the lack of Article III standing, the case was dismissed by the Supreme Court.

On January 7, 2021, President Trump formally conceded the election after the Electoral College vote count.

== Candidate participation timeline ==
Candidate announcement and, if applicable, withdrawal dates are as follows:

Political party
Alliance Party
American Solidarity Party
Birthday Party
Bread and Roses Party
Constitution Party
Democratic Party
Green Party
Independent
Libertarian Party
Progressive Party
Prohibition Party
Reform Party
Republican Party
Party for Socialism and Liberation
Socialist Action
Socialist Equality Party
Socialist Workers Party
Veterans Party of America
Exploratory committee
Events
Midterm elections
Iowa caucuses
Super; Tuesday
COVID-19 pandemic emergency declaration
Election; Day
Inauguration; Day
