= 2024 United States presidential straw poll in Puerto Rico =

- November 5, 2024

Non-binding preference poll
- Turnout: 57.51%

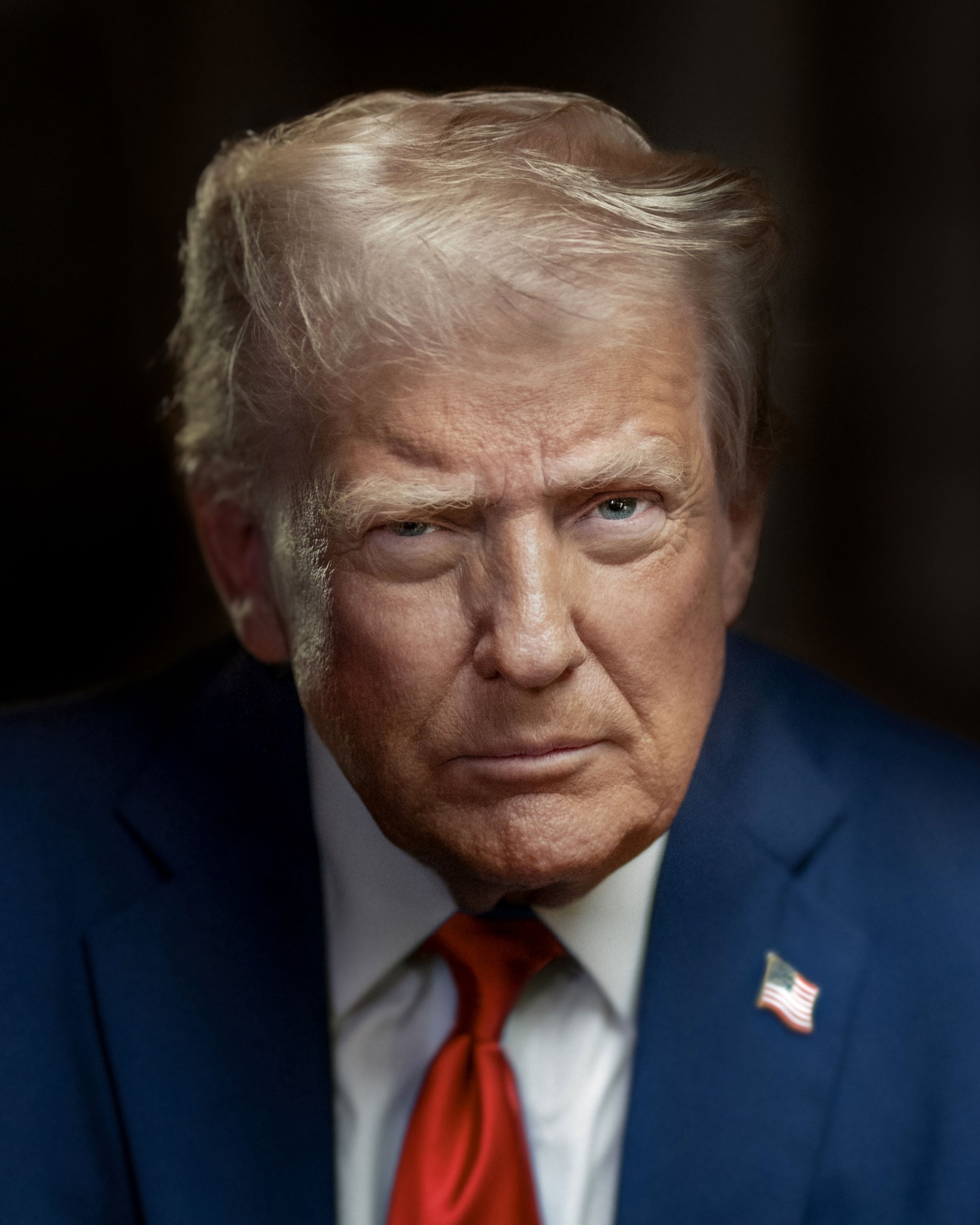

Nominee	Kamala Harris	Donald Trump	Blank ballots
Party	Democratic	Republican	–
Home state	California	Florida	–
Running mate	Tim Walz	JD Vance	–
Popular vote	724,947	263,270	123,127
Percentage	65.23%	23.69%	11.08%
- Harris 80–90% 70–80% 60–70% 50–60% Results by municipality (Does not include blank ballots.)

Although Puerto Rico does not participate in U.S. presidential general elections because it is an unincorporated territory and not a state, and therefore cannot send members to the U.S. Electoral College, Puerto Ricans are citizens of the United States and are able to participate in the U.S. presidential primaries.

With the enactment of Act No. 58 in 2020 by the pro-statehood New Progressive Party, voters will be able to participate in a non-binding presidential straw poll during the general election for the first time in the territory's history. Puerto Rico is the second U.S. territory to use straw polls for presidential elections, after Guam introduced their own in 1980 and has conducted a preference vote to coincide with every presidential election since.

== Primary elections ==
=== Democratic primary ===
The Democratic primary was held on April 28, 2024. Incumbent president Joe Biden won all 55 pledged delegates against minor opposition with 86% of the vote. However, following Biden's withdrawal from the race on July 21, the Puerto Rico delegates were instructed to pledge their support for vice president Kamala Harris at the Democratic National Convention.

Puerto Rico Democratic primary, April 28, 2024
Candidate	Votes	%	Delegates
Joe Biden (incumbent)	3,296	85.65	55
Marianne Williamson	230	5.98	0
Dean Phillips (withdrawn)	165	4.29	0
Blank and void ballots (Note: Blank 109, void 48 votes)	157	4.08	—
Total	3,848	100%	55

=== Republican primary ===
The Republican primary was held on April 21, 2024. Former president Donald Trump, who became the party's presumptive nominee on March 12, was the only candidate on the ballot and secured all 23 delegates.

Puerto Rico Republican primary, April 21, 2024
Candidate	Votes	Percentage	Actual delegate count		
Candidate	Votes	Percentage	Bound	Unbound	Total
Donald Trump	992	96.22%	23	0	23
Write-in votes	39	3.78%	0	0	0
Total:	1,031	100.00%	23	0	23

== General election ==
=== Polling ===
Poll source	Date(s) administered	Sample size	Margin of error	Kamala Harris Democratic	Donald Trump Republican	Other / Undecided
AtlasIntel	November 1—4, 2024	4,914 (A)	± 1.0%	56%	25%	18%
The Research Official Poll	September 28 — October 2, 2024	1,000 (A)	—	45%	30%	25%
Gaither International	July 12 — August 1, 2024	1,138 (A)	—	39%	38%	23%

=== Results ===
2024 United States presidential straw poll in Puerto Rico
Party	Candidate	Votes	%	±%
Democratic	Kamala Harris; Tim Walz	724,947	63.62%	N/A
Republican	Donald Trump; JD Vance	263,270	23.10%	N/A
Write-in		18,285	1.60%	N/A
Blank ballots		123,127	10.80%	N/A
Total votes		1,139,584	100.00%	N/A
Democratic win				

Turnout: 57.51%

== See also ==
- 2024 United States presidential straw poll in Guam
