= 2004 United States presidential straw poll in Guam =

- November 2, 2004

Non-binding preference poll

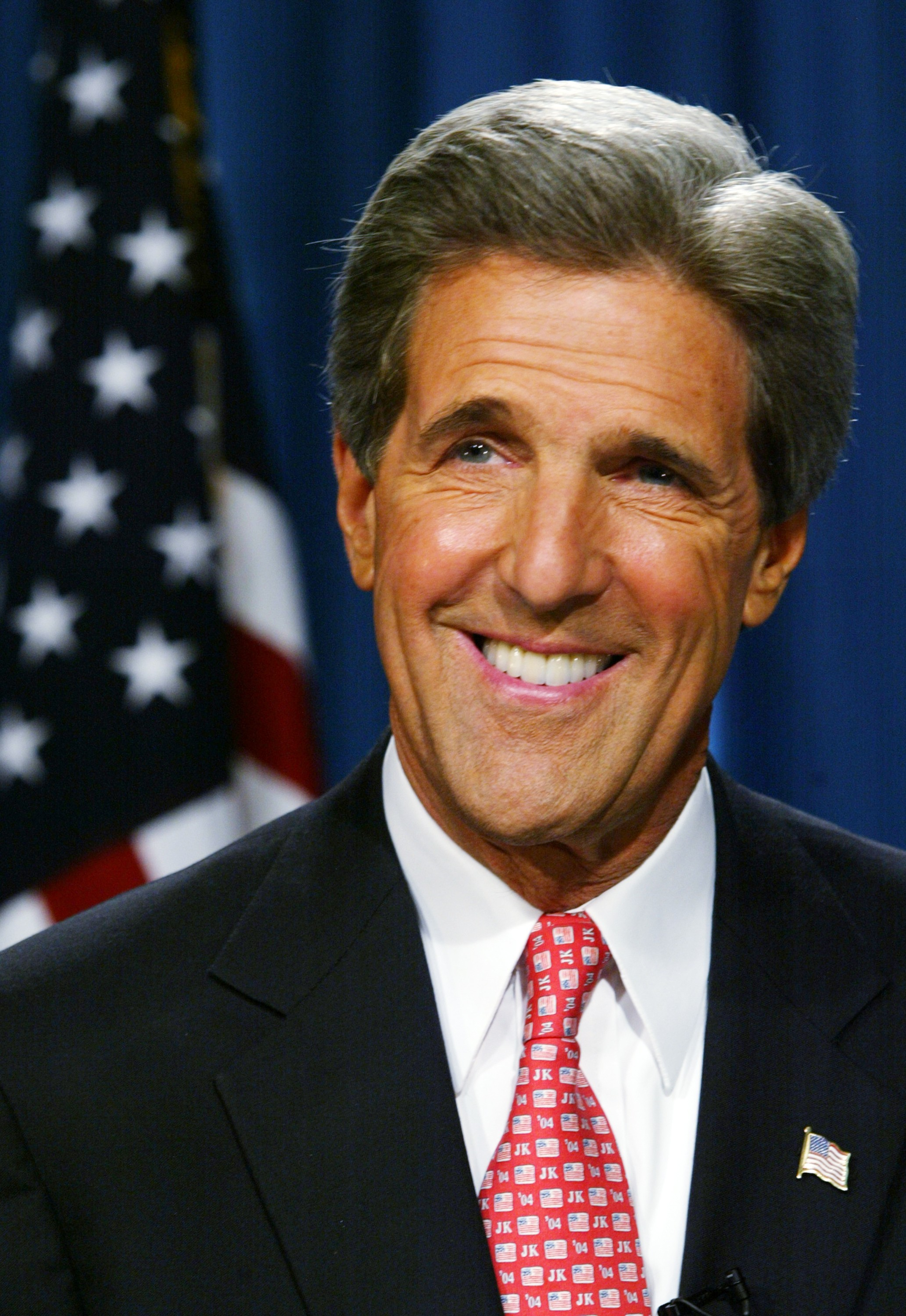
Nominee	George W. Bush	John Kerry
Party	Republican	Democratic
Home state	Texas	Massachusetts
Running mate	Dick Cheney	John Edwards
Popular vote	21,490	11,781
Percentage	64.08%	35.13%
Results by village
Bush
50–60%
60–70%
70–80%

The 2004 United States presidential straw poll in Guam took place on November 2, 2004, Guam is a territory and not a state. Thus, it is ineligible to elect members of the Electoral College, instead, the territory conducts a non-binding presidential straw poll during the general election. It does not cast direct electoral votes for president and vice president.

Incumbent Republican president George W. Bush won the straw poll by over 64% of the popular vote. This was the highest percentage of a straw poll in Guam until incumbent future Democratic president Barack Obama defeated Massachusetts Governor Mitt Romney in 2012.

== Results ==
The votes of Guam residents did not count in the presidential election, but the territory nonetheless conducts a presidential straw poll to gauge islanders' preference for president every election year since 1980.

2004 United States presidential straw poll in Guam
Party	Candidate	Running mate	Votes	Percentage
Republican	George W. Bush	Dick Cheney	21,490	64.08%
Democratic	John Kerry	John Edwards	11,781	35.13%
Independent	Ralph Nader	Peter Camejo	196	0.58%
Libertarian	Michael Badnarik	Richard Campagna	67	0.20%
Totals			33,534	100.00%

== See also ==
- United States presidential straw polls in Guam
