= 1992 United States presidential straw poll in Guam =

- November 2, 1992

Non-binding preference poll

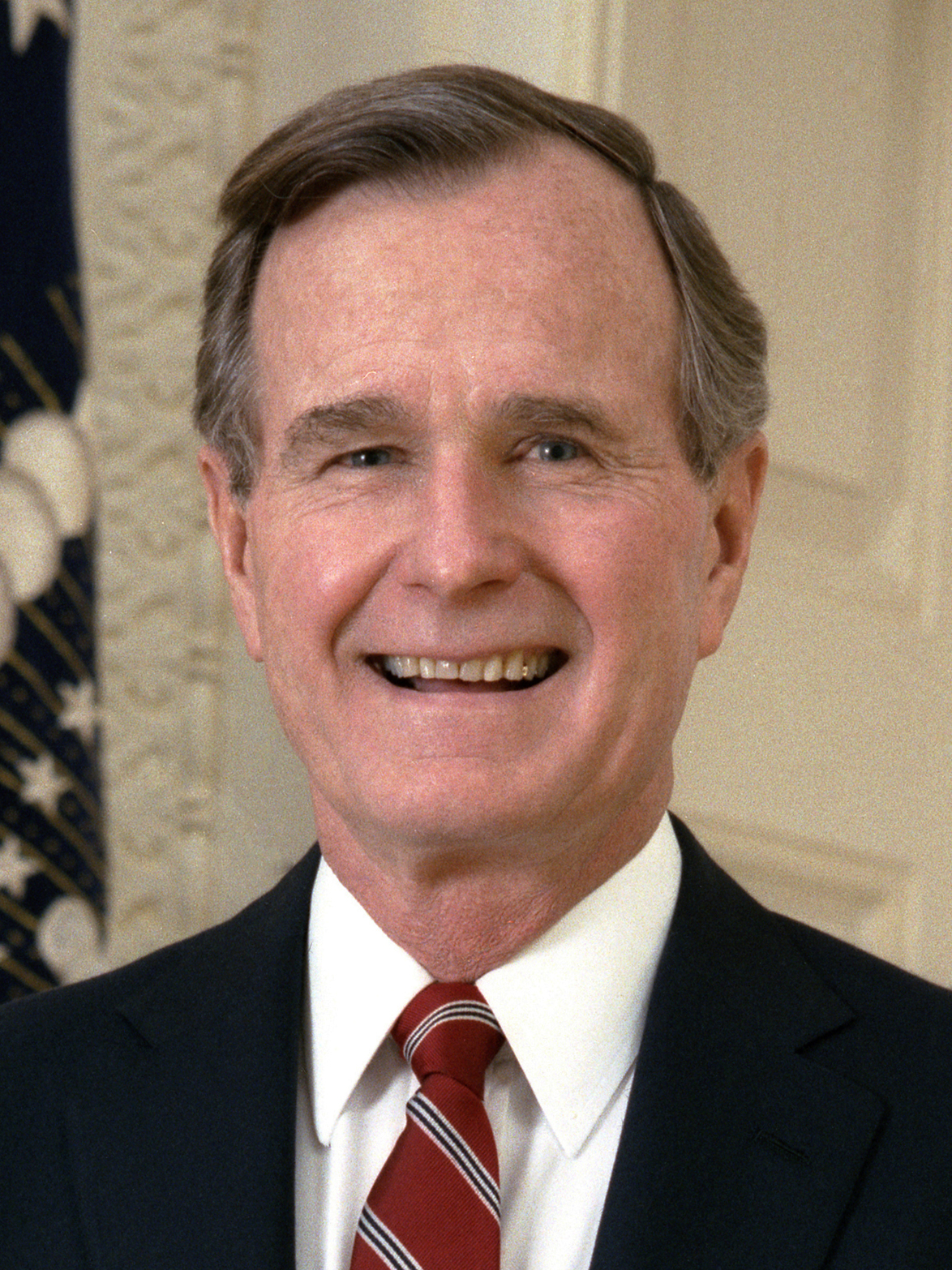
Nominee	Bill Clinton	George H. W. Bush
Party	Democratic	Republican
Home state	Arkansas	Texas
Running mate	Al Gore	Dan Quayle
Popular vote	10,233	6,817
Percentage	59.11%	39.86%
Village Results
Clinton
40–50%
50–60%
60–70%
Bush
50–60%

The 1992 United States presidential straw poll in Guam was held on November 3, 1992, Guam is a territory and not a state. Thus, it is ineligible to elect members of the Electoral College, instead, the territory conducts a non-binding presidential straw poll during the general election. It does not cast direct electoral votes for president and vice president. Although Ross Perot appeared on the ballot in every U.S. state in the general election, he did not appear on Guam’s ballot.

Democratic governor Bill Clinton won the straw poll with 59.11% of the vote.

== Results ==
The votes of Guam residents didn't count in this November presidential election, but the territory nonetheless conducts a presidential straw poll to gauge islanders' preference for president every election year. Since the first straw poll was in 1980.

1992 United States presidential straw poll in Guam
Party	Candidate	Running mate	Votes	Percentage
Democratic	Bill Clinton	Al Gore	10,233	59.11%
Republican	George H. W. Bush	Dan Quayle	6,817	39.38%
Independent	Lenora Fulani	Maria Elizabeth Muñoz	147	0.84%
Libertarian	Andre Marrou	Nancy Lord	116	0.67%
Totals			17,313	100.00%

== See also ==
- United States presidential straw polls in Guam
