= 2024 United States presidential straw poll in Guam =

- November 5, 2024

Non-binding preference poll

Nominee	Kamala Harris	Donald Trump
Party	Democratic	Republican
Home state	California	Florida
Running mate	Tim Walz	JD Vance
Popular vote	13,510	12,624
Percentage	49.46%	46.22%
Results by village
Harris
40–50%
50–60%
Trump
40–50%
50–60%

The 2024 United States presidential straw poll in Guam took place on November 5, 2024. Guam is a territory and not a state, making it ineligible to elect members of the Electoral College. However, Guam does conduct a non-binding presidential straw poll during the general election.

In the 2024 presidential election, incumbent Democratic president Joe Biden initially ran for re-election and became the party's presumptive nominee. However, he withdrew from the race on July 21 and endorsed Vice President Kamala Harris, who launched her presidential campaign the same day. The Republican nominee is former president Donald Trump.

This is the first time since 2000 that the straw poll voted for the candidate which lost the national popular vote, and the first time ever that the winner of the straw poll won by a plurality instead of a majority. Although Harris won the straw poll, she only won by a plurality, due to Trump's gains with Asian and Pacific Islander voters. Guam is 33% Chamorro and 36% Asian, and just 7% White.

== Background ==
Guam has held a straw poll coinciding with every presidential election since 1980 to gauge residents' preferences and raise awareness regarding the territory's lack of federal representation.

In the 2020 presidential straw poll, Biden defeated then-incumbent President Donald Trump with 55.38% of the popular vote.

== Results ==
2024 United States presidential straw poll in Guam
Party	Candidate	Votes	%	±%
Democratic	Kamala Harris; Tim Walz	13,510	49.46	▼5.92
Republican	Donald Trump; JD Vance	12,624	46.22	▲4.31
Independent	Robert F. Kennedy Jr. (withdrawn); Nicole Shanahan (withdrawn)	938	3.43	n/a
Green	Jill Stein; Butch Ware	119	0.44	▼0.26
American Solidarity	Peter Sonski; Lauren Onak	45	0.16	▼0.36
Socialist	Bill Stodden; Stephanie Cholensky	44	0.16	n/a
Prohibition	Michael Wood; John Pietrowski	34	0.12	▼0.19
Total votes		27,314	100.00%	

== See also ==
- United States presidential straw polls in Guam
