= 2012 United States presidential election in Wyoming =

- November 6, 2012

Nominee	Mitt Romney	Barack Obama
Party	Republican	Democratic
Home state	Massachusetts	Illinois
Running mate	Paul Ryan	Joe Biden
Electoral vote	3	0
Popular vote	170,962	69,286
Percentage	68.64%	27.82%
County results
Romney
40–50%
60–70%
70–80%
80–90%
Obama
50–60%
President before election
Barack Obama
Democratic
Elected President
Barack Obama
Democratic

The 2012 United States presidential election in Wyoming took place on November 6, 2012, as part of the 2012 United States presidential election in which all 50 states plus the District of Columbia participated. Wyoming voters chose three electors to represent them in the Electoral College via a popular vote pitting incumbent Democratic President Barack Obama and his running mate, Vice President Joe Biden, against Republican challenger and former Massachusetts Governor Mitt Romney and his running mate, Congressman Paul Ryan.

Prior to the election, 17 news organizations considered this a state Romney would win, or otherwise considered as a safe red state. Romney carried the state with 68.64% to Obama's 27.82%, with Libertarian Gary Johnson taking 2.14%.

With 68.64% of the popular vote, Wyoming would prove to be Romney's second strongest state in the 2012 election after neighboring Utah. As of the 2024 election, this is the last time that Albany County failed to back the overall winner of the Electoral College, and presidency.

== Caucuses ==
=== Republican caucuses ===
2012 Wyoming Republican presidential caucus
- March 6, 2012

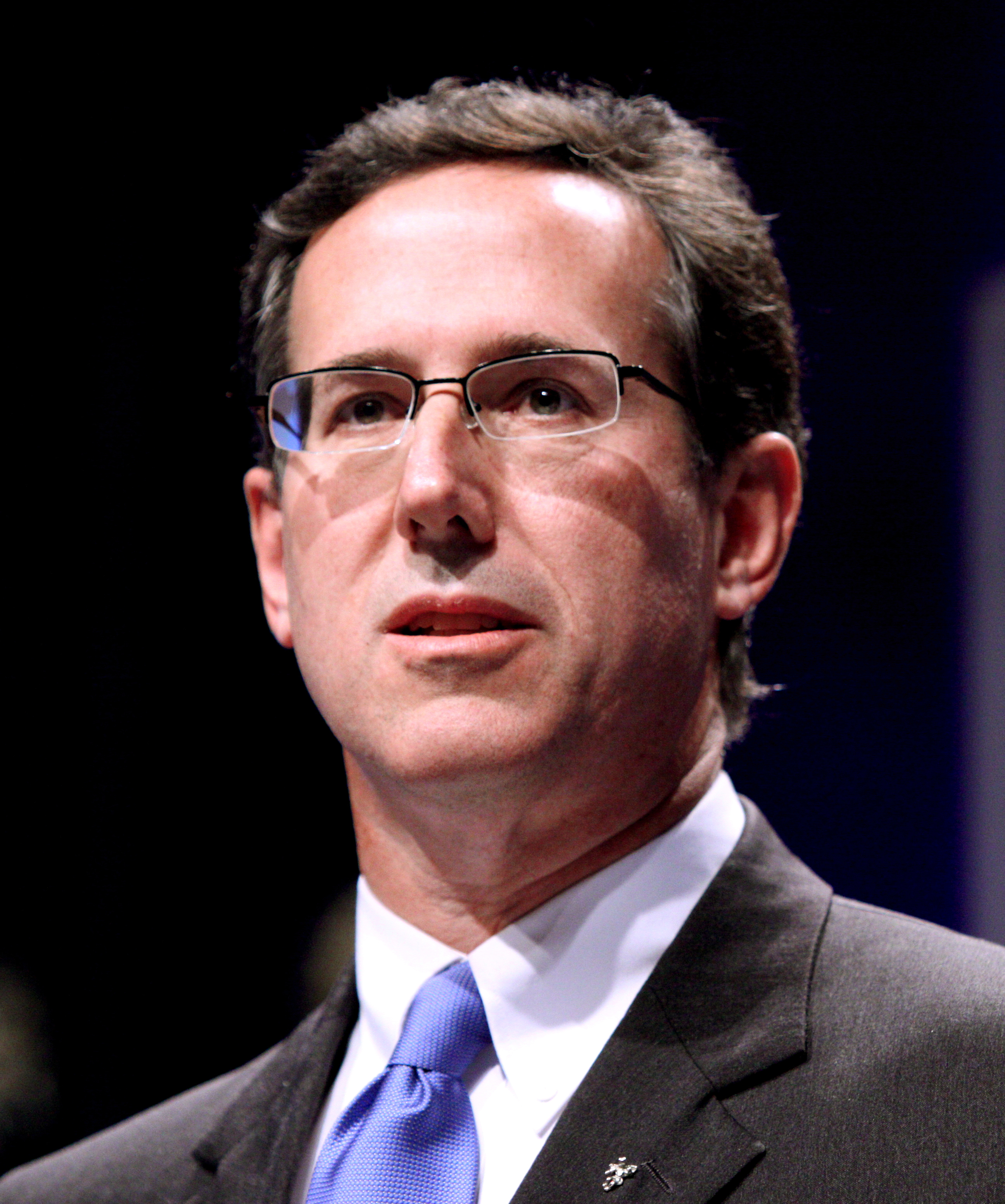

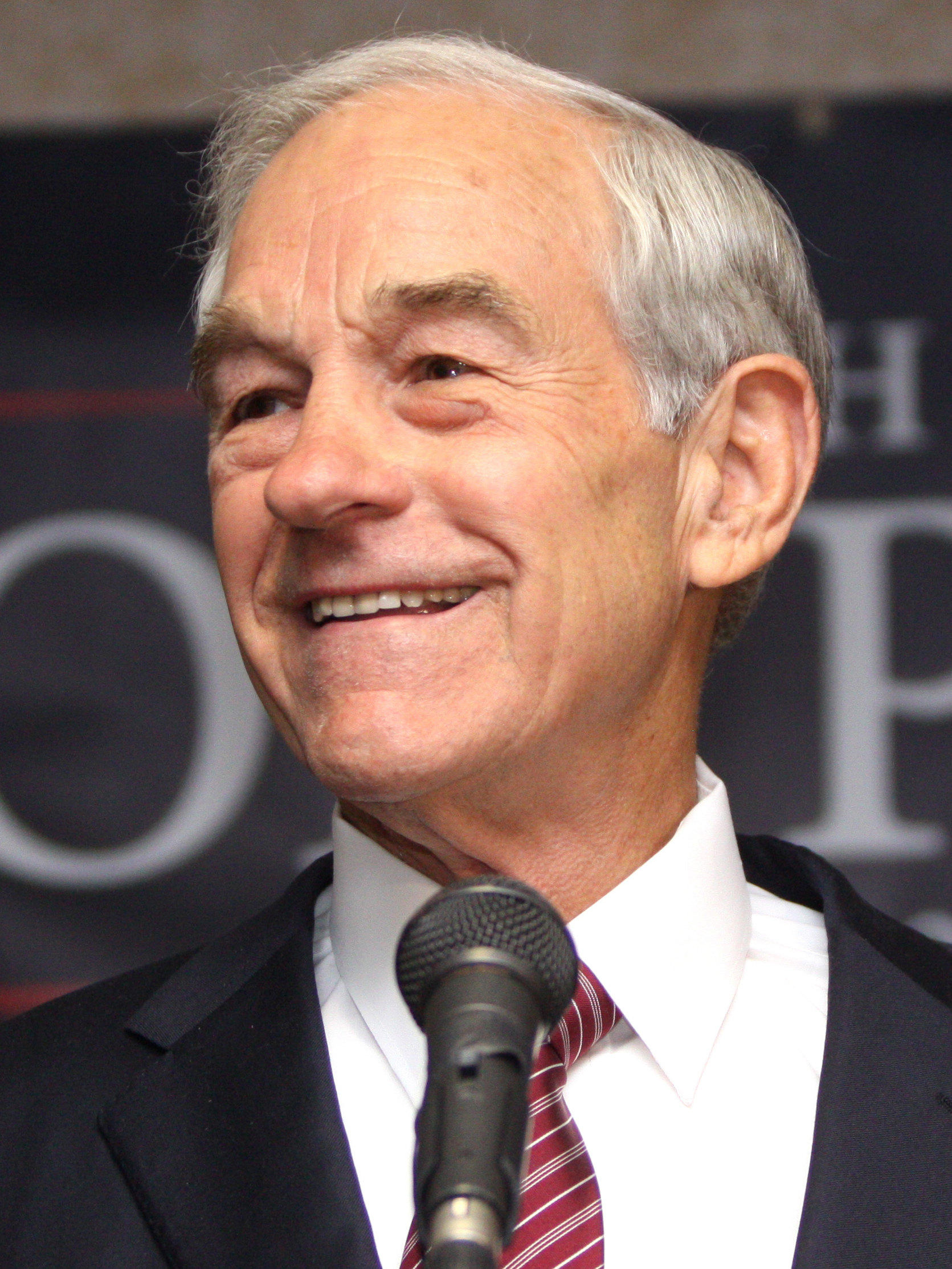

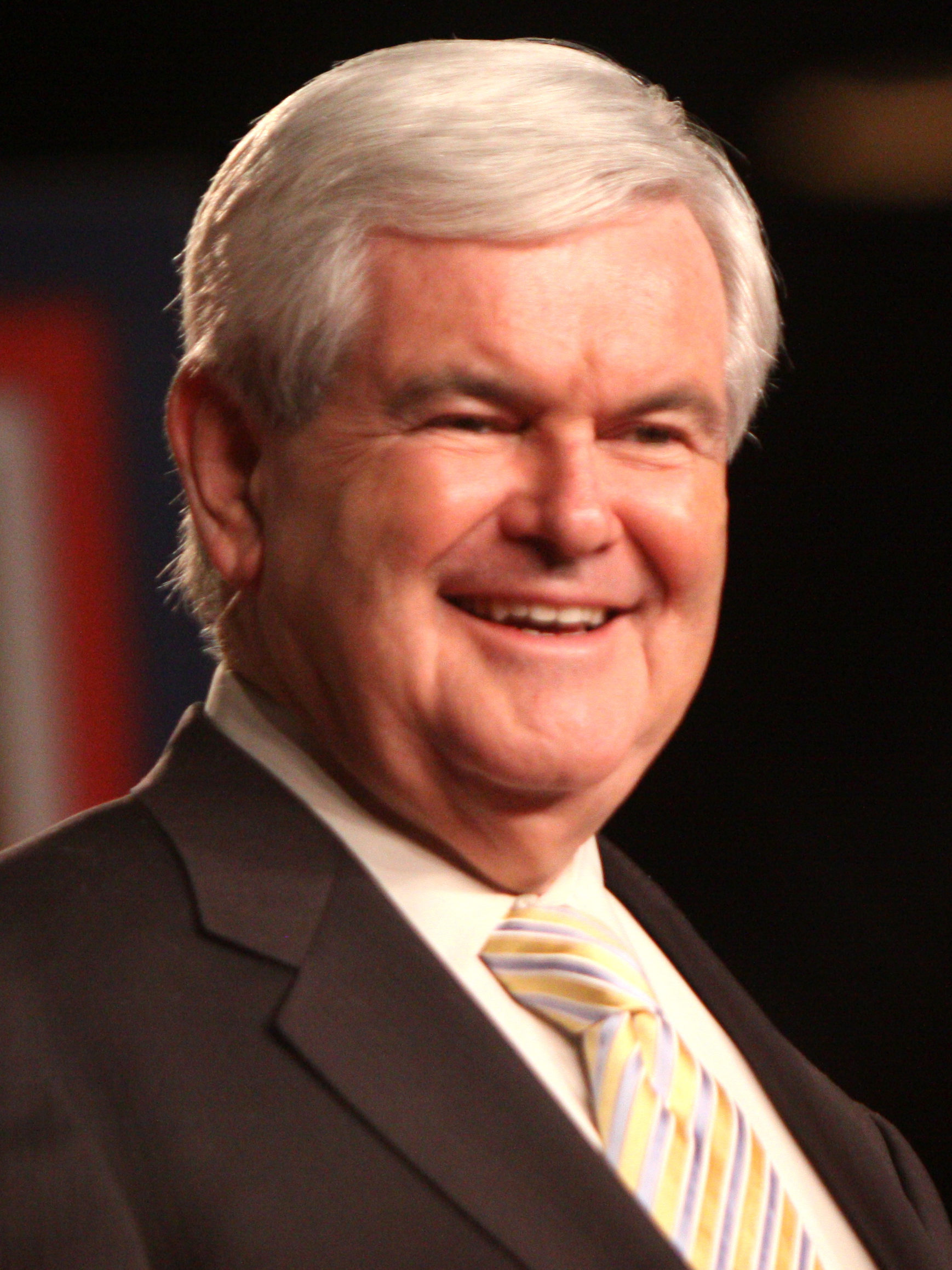
Candidate	Mitt Romney	Rick Santorum
Home state	Massachusetts	Pennsylvania
Delegate count	11	8
Popular vote	822	673
Percentage	38.99%	31.93%
Candidate	Ron Paul	Newt Gingrich
Home state	Texas	Georgia
Delegate count	6	2
Popular vote	439	165
Percentage	20.83%	7.83%
- Wyoming results by county Mitt Romney Rick Santorum Ron Paul

The Republican caucuses took place between Saturday, February 11 and Wednesday, February 29, 2012. The county conventions were held March 6–10, 2012. The results of the conventions were reported on Saturday, March 10, 2012, the same day on which the Guam, Kansas, and Virgin Islands caucuses were held. After narrowly beating Santorum during the precinct caucuses in February, Romney went on to win the county conventions decisively.

The caucuses took place over a number of days to accommodate the state's geographic size and sparse population, particularly ranchers in the midst of calving season. The entire process of nominating Wyoming's delegates lasts from February until April.

==== Precinct caucus results ====
The precinct caucuses that took place from February 11 to February 29 were the only stage of the Wyoming Republican caucuses in which every registered Wyoming Republican was eligible to participate. No delegates were chosen during this stage.

2012 Wyoming Republican presidential caucuses (straw poll)
Candidate	Votes	Percentage
Mitt Romney	822	38.99%
Rick Santorum	673	31.93%
Ron Paul	439	20.83%
Newt Gingrich	165	7.83%
Others	9	0.43%
Total:	2,108	100.00%

==== Convention ====
Delegates were chosen at county conventions on March 6–10 and the state convention on April 12–14.

Convention Results
Candidate	County Conventions	State	Party leaders	Total
Mitt Romney	8	14	0	22
Rick Santorum	2	0	0	2
Ron Paul	1	0	0	1
Unknown	1	0	3	4
Total	12	14	3	29

== General election ==
=== Predictions ===
Source	Ranking	As of
Huffington Post	Safe R	November 6, 2012
CNN	Safe R	November 6, 2012
New York Times	Safe R	November 6, 2012
Washington Post	Safe R	November 6, 2012
RealClearPolitics	Solid R	November 6, 2012
Sabato's Crystal Ball	Solid R	November 5, 2012
FiveThirtyEight	Solid R	November 6, 2012

=== Results ===
2012 United States presidential election in Wyoming
Party	Candidate	Running mate	Votes	Percentage	Electoral votes
Republican	Mitt Romney	Paul Ryan	170,962	68.64%	3
Democratic	Barack Obama (incumbent)	Joe Biden (incumbent)	69,286	27.82%	0
Libertarian	Gary Johnson	Jim Gray	5,326	2.14%	0
Write-Ins	Write-Ins		2,035	0.82%	0
Constitution	Virgil Goode	Jim Clymer	1,452	0.58%	0
Totals			249,061	100.00%	3

==== By county ====
County	Mitt Romney Republican		Barack Obama Democratic		Various candidates Other parties		Margin		Total votes cast
County	#	%	#	%	#	%	#	%	Total votes cast
Albany	7,866	48.26%	7,458	45.75%	976	5.99%	408	2.51%	16,300
Big Horn	4,285	80.48%	868	16.30%	171	3.21%	3,417	64.18%	5,324
Campbell	14,953	85.10%	2,163	12.31%	455	2.59%	12,790	72.79%	17,571
Carbon	4,148	63.73%	2,110	32.42%	251	3.86%	2,038	31.31%	6,509
Converse	5,043	79.50%	1,089	17.17%	211	3.32%	3,954	62.33%	6,343
Crook	3,109	84.37%	426	11.56%	150	4.07%	2,683	72.81%	3,685
Fremont	11,075	65.38%	5,333	31.48%	531	3.13%	5,742	33.90%	16,939
Goshen	4,178	71.96%	1,458	25.11%	170	2.93%	2,720	46.85%	5,806
Hot Springs	1,895	75.35%	523	20.80%	97	3.86%	1,372	54.55%	2,515
Johnson	3,363	78.96%	749	17.59%	147	3.45%	2,614	61.37%	4,259
Laramie	23,904	60.51%	14,295	36.19%	1,306	3.31%	9,609	24.32%	39,505
Lincoln	7,144	82.90%	1,287	14.93%	187	2.17%	5,857	67.97%	8,618
Natrona	22,132	68.37%	8,961	27.68%	1,280	3.96%	13,171	40.69%	32,373
Niobrara	1,022	80.09%	200	15.67%	54	4.23%	822	64.42%	1,276
Park	11,234	76.90%	2,927	20.04%	447	3.06%	8,307	56.86%	14,608
Platte	3,136	69.21%	1,223	26.99%	172	3.80%	1,913	42.22%	4,531
Sheridan	10,267	71.69%	3,618	25.26%	437	3.05%	6,649	46.43%	14,322
Sublette	3,472	79.34%	767	17.53%	137	3.13%	2,705	61.81%	4,376
Sweetwater	11,428	67.64%	4,774	28.26%	693	4.10%	6,654	39.38%	16,895
Teton	4,858	42.38%	6,213	54.20%	393	3.43%	-1,355	-11.82%	11,464
Uinta	6,615	77.47%	1,628	19.07%	296	3.46%	4,978	58.40%	8,539
Washakie	3,014	76.42%	794	20.13%	136	3.45%	2,220	56.29%	3,944
Weston	2,821	83.98%	422	12.56%	116	3.45%	2,399	71.42%	3,359
Total	170,962	68.64%	69,286	27.82%	8,813	3.54%	101,676	40.82%	249,061

Counties that flipped from Democratic to Republican

- Albany (largest municipality: Laramie)

==== By congressional district ====
Due to the state's low population, only one congressional district is allocated. This district is called the at-large district, because it covers the entire state, and thus is equivalent to the statewide election results.

District	Romney	Obama	Representative
At-large	68.64%	27.82%	Cynthia Lummis

== See also ==
- United States presidential elections in Wyoming
- Wyoming Republican Party
- 2012 Republican Party presidential debates and forums
- 2012 Republican Party presidential primaries
- Results of the 2012 Republican Party presidential primaries
