= 1996 United States presidential straw poll in Guam =

- November 5, 1996

Non-binding preference poll

Nominee	Bill Clinton	Bob Dole
Party	Democratic	Republican
Home state	Arkansas	Kansas
Running mate	Al Gore	Jack Kemp
Popular vote	19,265	12,524
Percentage	59.67%	38.79%
- Village Results Clinton 50–60% 60–70% 70–80%

The 1996 United States presidential straw poll in Guam was held on November 5, 1996, Guam is a territory and not a state. Thus, it is ineligible to elect members of the Electoral College, instead, the territory conducts a non-binding presidential straw poll during the general election. It does not cast direct electoral votes for president and vice president.

Incumbent Democratic President Bill Clinton won the straw poll with almost 59.7% of the vote.

== Results ==
The votes of Guam residents do not count in the November presidential election, but the territory nonetheless conducts a presidential straw poll to gauge islanders' preference for president every election year since the first straw poll was in 1980.

1996 United States presidential straw poll in Guam
Party	Candidate	Running mate	Votes	Percentage
Democratic	Bill Clinton	Al Gore	19,265	59.67%
Republican	Bob Dole	Jack Kemp	12,524	38.79%
Libertarian	Harry Browne	Jo Jorgensen	498	1.54%
Totals			32,287	100.00%

== See also ==
- United States presidential straw polls in Guam
