= 2000 United States presidential straw poll in Guam =

- November 7, 2000

Non-binding preference poll

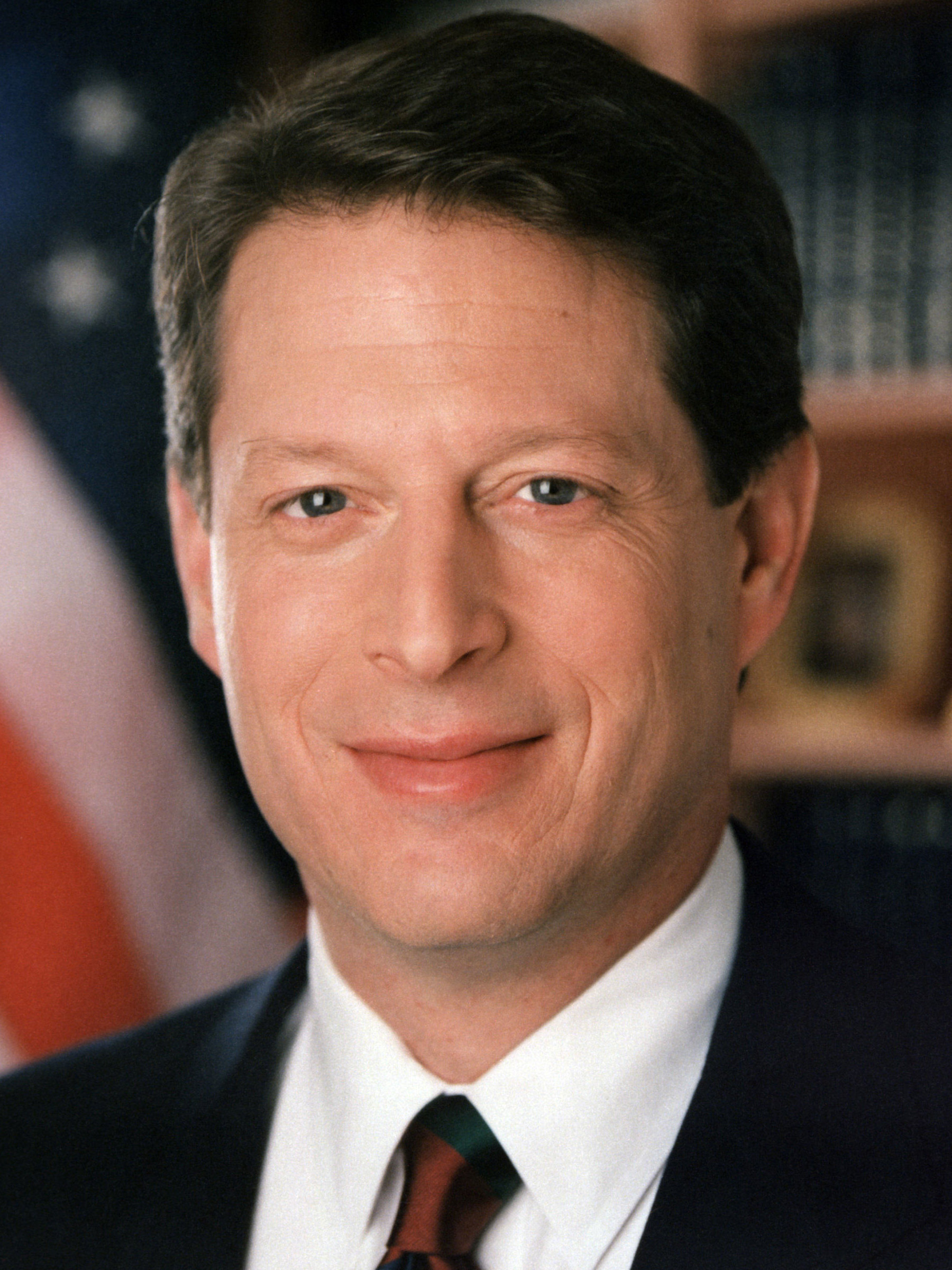
| Nominee | George W. Bush | Al Gore |
| Party | Republican | Democratic |
| Home state | Texas | Tennessee |
| Running mate | Dick Cheney | Joe Lieberman |
| Popular vote | 18,075 | 16,549 |
| Percentage | 51.58% | 47.22% |
Results by village
Bush
40–50%
50–60%
60–70%
Gore
50–60%

The 2000 United States presidential straw poll in Guam took place on November 7, 2000, Guam is a territory and not a state. Thus, it is ineligible to elect members of the Electoral College, instead, the territory conducts a non-binding presidential straw poll during the general election. It does not cast direct electoral votes for president and vice president.

Texas Governor George W. Bush defeated Democratic Vice President Al Gore by over 51% of the popular votes.

== Results ==
The votes of Guam residents did not count in the presidential election, but the territory has nonetheless conducted a presidential straw poll to gauge islanders' preference for president in every election since 1980.

2000 United States presidential straw poll in Guam
| Party | Candidate | Running mate | Votes | Percentage |
|---|---|---|---|---|
| Republican | George W. Bush | Dick Cheney | 18,075 | 51.58% |
| Democratic | Al Gore | Joe Lieberman | 16,549 | 47.22% |
| Libertarian | Harry Browne | Art Olivier | 137 | 1.20% |
| Totals | | | 34,761 | 100.00% |

== See also ==
- United States presidential straw polls in Guam
