= 1988 United States presidential straw poll in Guam =

- November 8, 1988

Non-binding preference poll

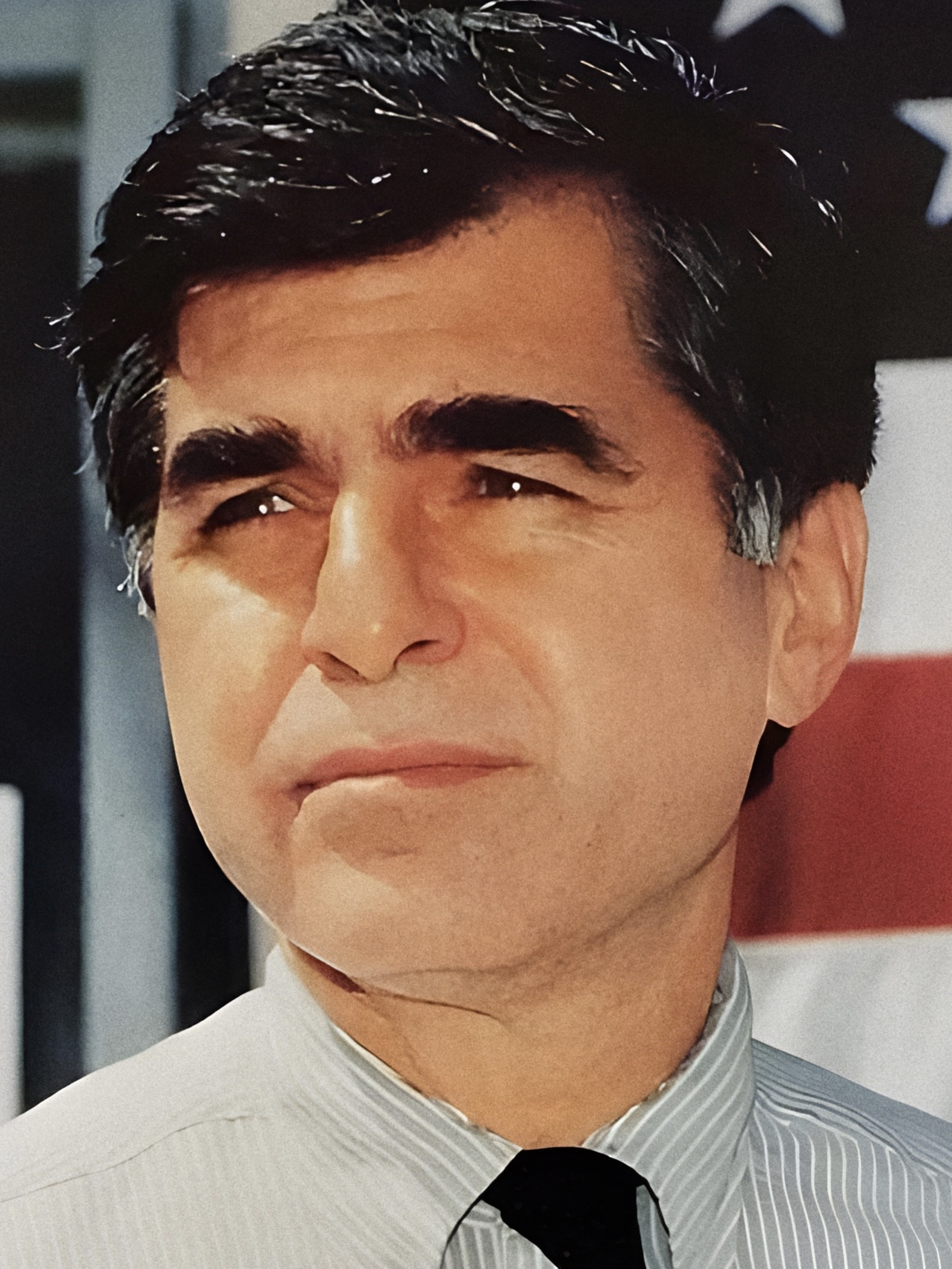
Nominee	George H. W. Bush	Michael Dukakis
Party	Republican	Democrat
Home state	Texas	Massachusetts
Running mate	Dan Quayle	Lloyd Bentsen
Popular vote	14,241	9,646
Percentage	58.84%	39.86%
Village Results
Bush
50–60%
60–70%
Dukakis
40–50%
50–60%

The 1988 United States presidential straw poll in Guam was held on November 8, 1988, Guam is a territory and not a state. Thus, it is ineligible to elect members of the Electoral College, instead, the territory conducts a non-binding presidential straw poll during the general election. It does not cast direct electoral votes for president and vice president.

Vice President George H. W. Bush won the straw poll by almost 58.9%.

== Results ==
The votes of Guam residents didn't count in this November presidential election, but the territory nonetheless conducts a presidential straw poll to gauge islanders' preference for president every election year. Since the first straw poll was in 1980.

1988 United States presidential straw poll in Guam
Party	Candidate	Running mate	Votes	Percentage
Republican	George H. W. Bush	Dan Quayle	14,241	58.84%
Democratic	Michael Dukakis	Lloyd Bentsen	9,646	39.86%
Libertarian	Lenora Fulani/Other	Joyce Dattner	75 + 111	0.77%
Independent	Ron Paul	Andre Marrou	129	0.53%
Totals			24,202	100.00%

== See also ==
- United States presidential straw polls in Guam
