= 1984 United States presidential straw poll in Guam =

- November 6, 1984

Non-binding preference poll

Nominee	Ronald Reagan	Walter Mondale
Party	Republican	Democrat
Home state	California	Minnesota
Running mate	George H. W. Bush	Geraldine Ferraro
Popular vote	17,259	9,429
Percentage	63.97%	34.95%
Village Results
Reagan
50–60%
60–70%
70–80%

The 1984 United States presidential straw poll in Guam was held on November 6, 1984, Guam is a territory and not a state. Thus, it is ineligible to elect members of the Electoral College, instead, the territory conducts a non-binding presidential straw poll during the general election. It does not cast direct electoral votes for president and for vice president.

Incumbent Republican president Ronald Reagan won the straw poll with almost 64% of the vote.

== Results ==
The votes of Guam residents do not count in the November presidential election, but the territory nonetheless conducts a presidential straw poll to gauge islanders' preference for president every election year. Since the first straw poll was in 1980.

1984 United States presidential straw poll in Guam
Party	Candidate	Running mate	Votes	Percentage
Republican	Ronald Reagan	George H. W. Bush	17,259	63.97%
Democratic	Walter Mondale	Geraldine Ferraro	9,429	34.95%
Independent	Other	–	154	0.57%
Libertarian	David Bergland	Jim Lewis	137	0.51%
Totals			26,979	100.00%

== See also ==
- 1984 United States presidential election
- 1984 Democratic Party presidential primaries
- 1984 Republican Party presidential primaries
