= 2012 Guam Democratic presidential caucuses =

- May 5, 2012
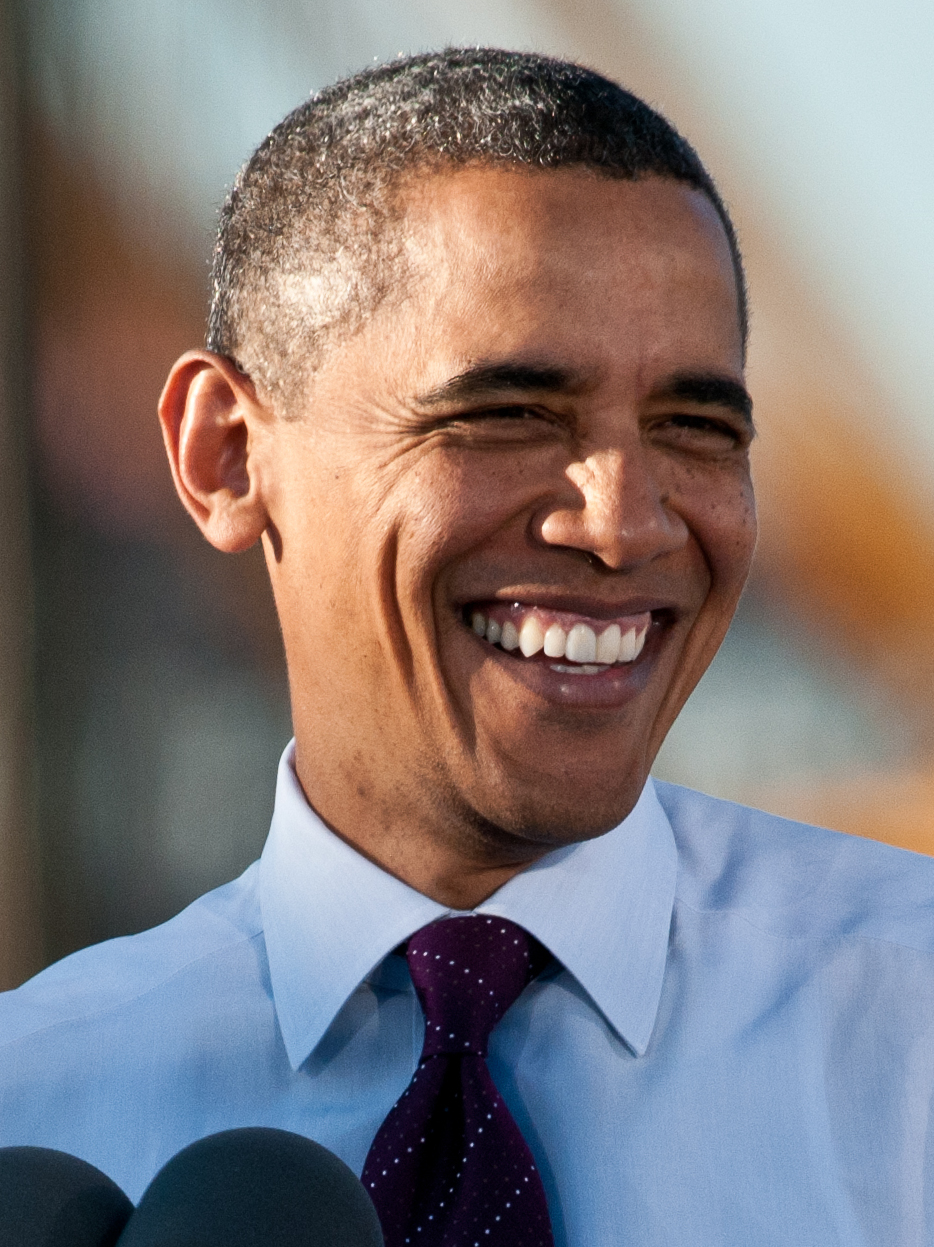
Candidate	Barack Obama
Home state	Illinois
Delegate count	7
Popular vote	700
Percentage	100%

The 2012 Guam Democratic presidential caucuses took place on May 5 in the U.S. territory of Guam as one of the Democratic Party's primaries ahead of the 2012 presidential election.

No other primary election was scheduled for this day. The Republican Party's Guam caucus took place on March 10, 2012.

== Results ==
The Democratic Party caucus took place on May 5. Barack Obama ran unopposed in most primaries across the nation, including Guam. He received 100% of the caucus vote against no opponents.

Guam Democratic caucuses, 2012
Candidate	Popular vote		Delegates		
Candidate	Count	Percentage	Pledged delegates	Super delegates	Total delegates
Barack Obama	700	100.0%	7	5	12
Total:	700	100%	7	5	12

== See also ==
- 2012 United States presidential straw poll in Guam
- 2012 United States presidential election
- 2012 Guam Republican presidential caucuses
