= 2008 Guam Democratic presidential caucuses =

- May 3, 2008

Nominee	Barack Obama	Hillary Clinton
Home state	Illinois	New York
Popular vote	2,264	2,257
Percentage	50.08%	49.92%
- Results by village Barack Obama Hillary Clinton

The 2008 Guam Democratic presidential caucus took place on May 3, 2008. Senator Barack Obama won by 7 votes, a margin of less than 0.2%. This resulted in each candidate getting 2 pledged delegates to the 2008 Democratic National Convention. Guam Democrats also sent five unpledged superdelegates to the convention.

== Results ==
Primary date: May 3, 2008

National pledged delegate votes determined: 4

Guam Democratic caucuses, 2008
Candidate	Votes	Percentage	Delegates votes
Barack Obama	2,264	50.08%	2
Hillary Clinton	2,257	49.92%	2
Total	4,521	100%	4

== See also ==
- 2008 United States presidential straw poll in Guam
- 2008 United States presidential election
- 2008 Guam Republican presidential caucuses
