= 2008 United States presidential straw poll in Guam =

- November 4, 2008

Non-binding preference poll

Nominee	Barack Obama	John McCain
Party	Democratic	Republican
Home state	Illinois	Arizona
Running mate	Joe Biden	Sarah Palin
Popular vote	20,119	11,941
Percentage	62.34%	37.00%
- Results by village Obama 50–60% 60–70% 70–80%

The 2008 United States presidential straw poll in Guam was held on November 4, 2008. Guam is a territory and not a state. Thus, it is ineligible to elect members of the Electoral College, who would then in turn cast direct electoral votes for president and for vice president. To draw attention to this fact, the territory conducts a non-binding presidential straw poll during the general election as if they did elect members to the Electoral College.

The territory still participated in the U.S. presidential caucuses and primaries like the other states and territories.

Democratic Party nominee Barack Obama won the poll with over 60% of the vote.

== Results ==
2008 United States presidential straw poll in Guam
Party	Candidate	Running mate	Votes	Percentage
Democratic	Barack Obama	Joe Biden	20,119	62.34%
Republican	John McCain	Sarah Palin	11,941	37.00%
Libertarian	Bob Barr	Wayne Root	214	0.66%
Totals			32,274	100.00%

== See also ==
- 2008 United States presidential election
- 2008 Guam Democratic presidential caucuses
- 2008 Guam Republican presidential caucuses
