= 2008 Guam Republican presidential caucuses =

- March 8, 2008
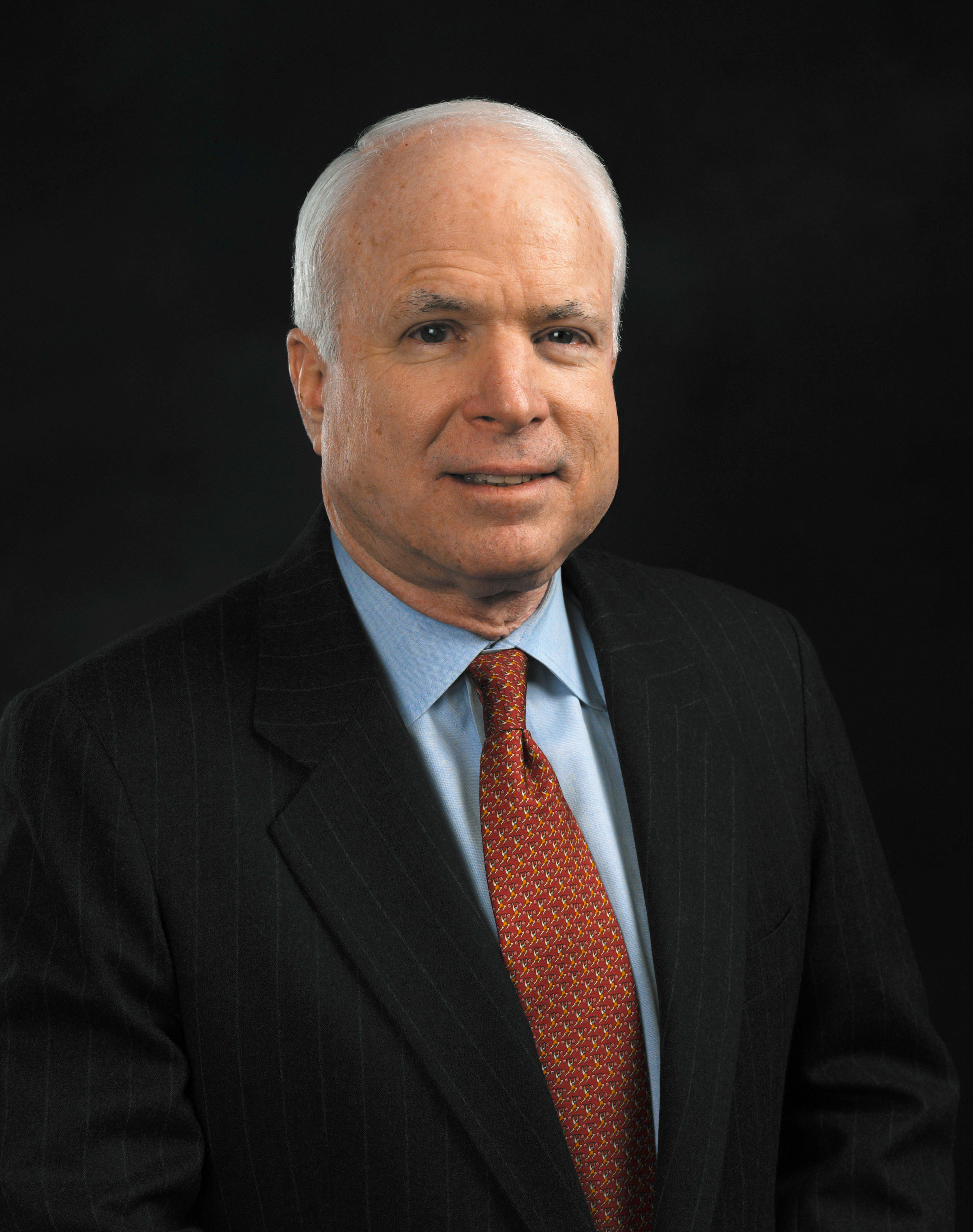

Candidate	John McCain	Mike Huckabee
Party	Republican	Republican
Home state	Arizona	Arkansas
Delegate count	4	2
Popular vote	1,648	1,286
Percentage	60.0%	40.0%

The 2008 Guam Republican presidential caucuses, also called the Guam state convention, took place on March 8, 2008. The approximately 500 people who attended the convention chose six delegates to represent Guam at the 2008 Republican National Convention. John McCain won all six of the delegates. Guam also sent three unpledged party delegates to the party convention, for a total delegation of nine.

The caucuses had been tentatively scheduled for February 16 but later changed.

== Results ==
100% of precincts reporting
Candidate	Votes	Percentage	Delegates
Mike Huckabee	1, 286	40.0%	2
John McCain	1, 648	60.0%	4
Ron Paul	0	0.0%	0
Total	2,934	100%	6

== See also ==
- 2008 United States presidential straw poll in Guam
- 2008 United States presidential election
- 2008 Guam Democratic presidential caucuses
