= 2020 Guam presidential caucuses =

2020 United States presidential caucuses in Guam
- 2020 Guam Democratic presidential caucus
- June 6, 2020

13 delegates (7 pledged, 6 unpledged) to the Democratic National Convention The number of pledged delegates won is determined by the popular vote

Candidate	Joe Biden	Bernie Sanders (withdrawn)
Home state	Delaware	Vermont
Delegate count	5	2
Popular vote	270	118
Percentage	69.59%	30.41%
- Election results by village Joe Biden
- 2020 Guam Republican presidential caucus
- March 14, 2020

9 originally unbound delegates to the Republican National Convention The delegates were bound by party resolution
Candidate	Donald Trump
Home state	Florida
Delegate count	9
Popular vote	uncontested
Percentage	100%

Although Guam did not participate in the 2020 presidential election because it is a U.S. territory and not a state, it still participated in the U.S. presidential primaries and caucuses. Former vice president Joe Biden won the Democratic caucus, held on June 6. The Republican caucus, held on March 14 in the form of a "state convention", endorsed incumbent President Donald Trump.

== Democratic caucus ==
The 2020 Guam Democratic presidential caucus was held on June 6, 2020, a Saturday, in the Democratic Party primaries and caucuses for the 2020 presidential election alongside the U.S. Virgin Islands caucuses on the same day. The Guam caucus was a closed caucus, with the territory awarding 13 delegates to the 2020 Democratic National Convention, of which 7 were pledged delegates allocated on the basis of the results of the caucus. Former vice president Joe Biden decisively won the caucus with almost 70% over senator Bernie Sanders, who had suspended his campaign, giving 5 delegates to Biden and 2 to Sanders.

=== Procedure ===
When the Guam Democratic Party published its draft delegate selection plan on July 7, 2019, it had originally specified a May 2 date for the 2020 caucus, but in May it was postponed to June 6 and following the final decision on June 4 it was completely held as a drive-through "Special Election and Caucus" at Adelup Breezeway in the capital Hagåtña, using unusual paper ballots for the presidential preference, due to concerns regarding the COVID-19 pandemic. The caucus thereby took place on the same day as the caucus on the Virgin Islands, which had regularly been planned for the date.

In the closed caucus, candidates had to meet a threshold of 15 percent across the territory to be considered viable. The 7 pledged delegates to the 2020 Democratic National Convention were allocated proportionally on the basis of the results of the caucus. Of these, all 7 were at-large pledged delegates. Originally planned with 6 delegates, the final number included a 20% bonus of 1 additional delegate by the Democratic National Committee due to the original May date, which belonged to Stage III on the primary timetable.

The delegation also included 6 unpledged PLEO delegates: 4 members of the Democratic National Committee, one member of Congress (House of Representatives nonvoting delegate Michael San Nicolas), and the governor Lou Leon Guerrero.

=== Results ===
As participants would originally have advocated their support for a candidate during the caucus without any secret ballot, candidates did not need to qualify for ballot access (making it the only other contest beside Iowa to do so). The so-called "special election" finally held because of the pandemic used paper ballots and included on them the two remaining national candidates that were still seeking delegates.

2020 Guam Democratic caucuses
Candidate	Votes	%	Delegates
Joe Biden	270	69.59	5
Bernie Sanders (withdrawn)	118	30.41	2
Total	388	100%	7

== Republican caucus ==
The 2020 Guam Republican presidential caucus took place at the so-called Guam Republican State Convention on March 14, 2020, in the Republican Party primaries and caucuses for the 2020 presidential election. The 6 at-large delegates to be elected for the 2020 Republican National Convention at the state convention were originally unbound according to local party rules, without any formal process (except their own decision) existing to bind them to a candidate. The state convention officially endorsed incumbent President Donald Trump and bound all 9 delegates from Guam to him, even though the 3 party leader delegates were automatic delegates and would regularly stay unbound before the national convention.

== See also ==
- 2020 United States presidential straw poll in Guam
