= Iowa Straw Poll (1979–2011) =

American political event

- 2011 logo
- Venue: Central Iowa Expo
- Location: Ames, Iowa, United States
- Type: Straw poll
- Cause: Republican U.S. presidential candidate selection process
- Organized by: Iowa Republican Party
- Participants: Republican Party

The Iowa Straw Poll (also known as the Ames Straw Poll) was a presidential straw poll and fundraising event for the Republican Party of Iowa. It was held six times, traditionally in late summer approximately six months in advance of contested presidential Iowa caucuses, from 1979 until 2011, on the campus of Iowa State University in Ames.

The event attracted both praise and criticism, with supporters noting that it raised funds for the Republican Party of Iowa and winnowed large fields of presidential candidates. Critics asserted that it catered to extremist candidates and put a financial squeeze on campaigns. The poll itself held a mixed record as a bellwether for either the Iowa caucuses or the GOP nomination; on three occasions (George H. W. Bush in '79, Bob Dole in '95, and George W. Bush in '99) the winner of the straw poll also won the Iowa caucuses the next year, but only twice ('95 and '99) did these candidates win the GOP nomination. Only one winner of the straw poll, George W. Bush, won the presidency.

On June 12, 2015, the Republican Party of Iowa announced that the straw poll would no longer be held. A similar poll (also at times referred to as the Iowa Straw Poll) has been conducted at the Iowa State Fair since 2015.

== Format ==
The poll took place among attendees of a fundraising dinner benefiting the Iowa Republican Party. Before the vote, each candidate was given an opportunity to make a short speech to the attendees.

The poll has been described as a cross between a political convention and a county fair, where Iowa voters had a chance to mingle, eat barbecue and have a little fun. The party divided the venue into sections and auctioned each to the candidates, who could then set up booths to present their case to the voters. The larger areas and those closest to the entrance tended to fetch the highest price. In 2011 bidding started at $15,000 and ranged to as high as $31,000 (bid by Ron Paul).

Non-Republicans were allowed to vote in the Iowa Straw Poll. However, for the later years of the poll, all voters were required to be at least 16 1/2 years of age, be a legal resident of Iowa or a student attending an Iowa university or college, and purchase a ticket, although some campaigns paid the fee for their supporters. Voters had their hands stamped or their thumbs dipped in ink when entering the voting area so that they could not vote twice. Ballots were put into electronic voting machines.

== Significance ==
As a straw poll, the Iowa Straw Poll's results were non-binding and had no official effect on the presidential primaries. However, the straw poll was frequently seen as a first test of organizational strength in Iowa by the news media and party insiders. As such, it could be beneficial for the winning candidate on the national level because it built momentum for their campaign, enhanced their aura of inevitability, or showed off a superior field operation.

Nevertheless, in the six times the poll was held, the winner of the Iowa Straw Poll went on to win the Iowa caucuses only three times for that same election cycle. The winner of the straw poll won the Republican presidential nomination twice for that same election cycle. Two additional winners of the straw poll (George H. W. Bush and Mitt Romney) won the Republican nomination, but not in the same election cycle that they won the straw poll. Usually the winner or the second-place finisher in the straw poll went on to win the Iowa caucuses, although in 2011, Rick Santorum placed fourth in the straw poll before winning the caucuses the following January.

On a more local level, the Iowa Straw Poll gave a major boost to the local economy. Thousands of people, including journalists, campaign staffers, and voters, arrived in town each election cycle around the time of the poll. The Iowa Straw Poll was one of the Iowa Republican Party's most lucrative fundraising events.

In fall 2020, one Republican pundit compared the upcoming Georgia and Senate runoffs to this event: "It'll be like Iowa during the straw poll era. A modern-day Ames in the Peach State."

== Criticisms ==
In its early years, the Iowa Straw Poll was criticized for having many voters who were not residents of Iowa. Candidates would bus in supporters from other states. However, beginning with the 1999 Iowa Straw Poll, all voters were required to show proof of legal residence in Iowa. Before the 1999 Iowa Straw Poll, cheating was perceived to be widespread: many individuals managed to vote repeatedly by visiting the bathroom and washing off the stamp on the back of their hand which indicated they had voted. Beginning with the 1999 Iowa Straw Poll, the ink used for hand-stamping was changed to one that resisted being washed off. In 2007, instead of hand-stamping, thumbs were dipped in indelible ink.

In 2007, the Iowa Straw Poll was criticized for having only 14,302 voters participating, compared to about 23,000 voters eight years earlier in the 1999 polls, and for failing to have three of the four leading candidates participate in the poll, Rudy Giuliani, John McCain and Fred Thompson. Consequently, the votes received by Mitt Romney and second-place finisher Mike Huckabee failed to demonstrate the consequence of full competition among all candidates. The poll was criticized for heavily favoring better-funded candidates, as better-funded candidates were able to afford transportation costs to bus in more supporters and to reimburse those supporters for meal tickets.

In 2012, Iowa Governor Terry Branstad said "I think the straw poll has outlived its usefulness" and "It has been a great fundraiser for the party but I think its days are over." The party eventually decided to cancel the 2015 contest and all future contests on June 12, 2015; several high-profile candidates had indicated they would not participate in that year's poll, and the party stated that the poll was causing a distraction from the state's official caucus several months after the straw poll.

== Results ==
=== Summary of results ===
Date	Associated primaries and/or elections	Winner of Iowa Straw Poll	Winner of Iowa Caucus	Winner of Republican primaries	Winner of presidential election	Price of a dinner ticket
August 1979	1980 Republican primaries 1980 presidential election	George H. W. Bush	George H. W. Bush	Ronald Reagan	Ronald Reagan	
September 12, 1987	1988 Republican primaries 1988 presidential election	Pat Robertson	Bob Dole	George H. W. Bush	George H. W. Bush	
August 19, 1995	1996 Republican primaries 1996 presidential election	Bob Dole, Phil Gramm (tie)	Bob Dole	Bob Dole	Bill Clinton	
August 14, 1999	2000 Republican primaries 2000 presidential election	George W. Bush	George W. Bush	George W. Bush	George W. Bush	$25
August 11, 2007	2008 Republican primaries 2008 presidential election	Mitt Romney	Mike Huckabee	John McCain	Barack Obama	$35
August 13, 2011	2012 Republican primaries 2012 presidential election	Michele Bachmann	Rick Santorum	Mitt Romney	Barack Obama	$30

=== Detailed results ===
==== 1979 ====
George H. W. Bush won the first Iowa Straw Poll, which had low voter turnout, as well as the caucus itself, but Ronald Reagan won the Republican nomination.

==== 1987 ====
Source of results: Iowa Republican Party

Place	Candidate	Votes	Percentage
1	Pat Robertson	1,293	33.6%
2	Bob Dole	958	24.9%
3	George H. W. Bush	864	22.5%
4	Jack Kemp	520	13.5%
5	Pete duPont	160	4.2%
6	Alan Heslop	13	0.3%
7	Alexander Haig	12	0.3%
8	Ben Fernandez	8	0.2%
9	Others	15	0.4%
Total		3,843	100%

Pat Robertson won the 1987 Iowa Straw Poll. Despite finishing second in the Iowa Straw Poll, Bob Dole won the Iowa Caucus. Despite finishing third in the Iowa Straw Poll, George H. W. Bush won the Republican nomination and the presidency.

==== 1995 ====
Source of results: Iowa Republican Party

Place	Candidate	Votes	Percentage
1 (tie)	Phil Gramm	2,582	24.4%
1 (tie)	Bob Dole	2,582	24.4%
3	Pat Buchanan	1,922	18.1%
4	Lamar Alexander	1,156	10.9%
5	Alan Keyes	804	7.6%
6	Morry Taylor	803	7.6%
7	Richard Lugar	466	4.4%
8	Pete Wilson	129	1.2%
9	Bob Dornan	87	0.8%
10	Arlen Specter	67	0.6%
Total		10,958	100%

10,958 voters participated in the 1995 Iowa Straw Poll. Bob Dole and Phil Gramm won with a tie. Bob Dole won the Republican nomination.

==== 1999 ====
Sources of results: Iowa Republican Party, PBS

Place	Candidate	Votes	Percentage
1	George W. Bush	7,418	31.3%
2	Steve Forbes	4,921	20.8%
3	Elizabeth Dole	3,410	14.4%
4	Gary Bauer	2,114	8.9%
5	Patrick Buchanan	1,719	7.3%
6	Lamar Alexander	1,428	6.0%
7	Alan Keyes	1,101	4.6%
8	Dan Quayle	916	3.9%
9	Orrin Hatch	558	2.4%
10	John McCain	83	0.4%
11	John Kasich	9	0.04%
12	Bob Smith	8	0.03%
Total		23,685	100%

A record 23,685 voters participated in the 1999 Iowa Straw Poll, held at the Hilton Coliseum. George W. Bush was cemented as the frontrunner by the results of the Iowa Straw Poll and eventually went on to win the Iowa caucuses; Steve Forbes, who had committed a fair amount of cash to winning the poll, was embarrassed by his second-place showing. Elizabeth Dole, who had spent comparably less, considered her third-place finish a boost to her flagging campaign (though she dropped out two months later due to lackluster fundraising). John McCain, who later emerged as Bush's only serious competition in the GOP primaries, received just 83 votes in the poll, but was not an official candidate at the time; he was also considered unpopular in Iowa due to his opposition to ethanol subsidies. Due to poor results in the Iowa Straw Poll, Lamar Alexander and Dan Quayle both dropped out of the presidential race immediately after the Iowa Straw Poll.

==== 2007 ====
Sources of results: CBS News, Des Moines Register, KCCI

Place	Candidate	Votes	Percentage
1	Mitt Romney	4,516	31.6%
2	Mike Huckabee	2,587	18.1%
3	Sam Brownback	2,192	15.3%
4	Tom Tancredo	1,961	13.7%
5	Ron Paul	1,305	9.1%
6	Tommy Thompson	1,039	7.3%
7	Fred Thompson	203	1.4%
8	Rudy Giuliani	183	1.3%
9	Duncan Hunter	174	1.2%
10	John McCain	101	0.7%
11	John H. Cox	41	0.3%
Total		14,302	100%

14,302 ballots were cast in the 2007 Iowa-StrawPollNoShows"

In June, two months before the poll, presidential candidates Rudy Giuliani and John McCain announced that they would skip the 2007 Iowa Straw Poll, while Fred Thompson had yet to officially enter the race. The Iowa Republican Party decided to include their names on the ballots anyway. Mitt Romney won the straw poll, as had been widely predicted prior to the event.

Tommy Thompson dropped out of the presidential campaign on August 12, 2007, one day after finishing in sixth place in the Iowa Straw Poll.

==== 2011 ====
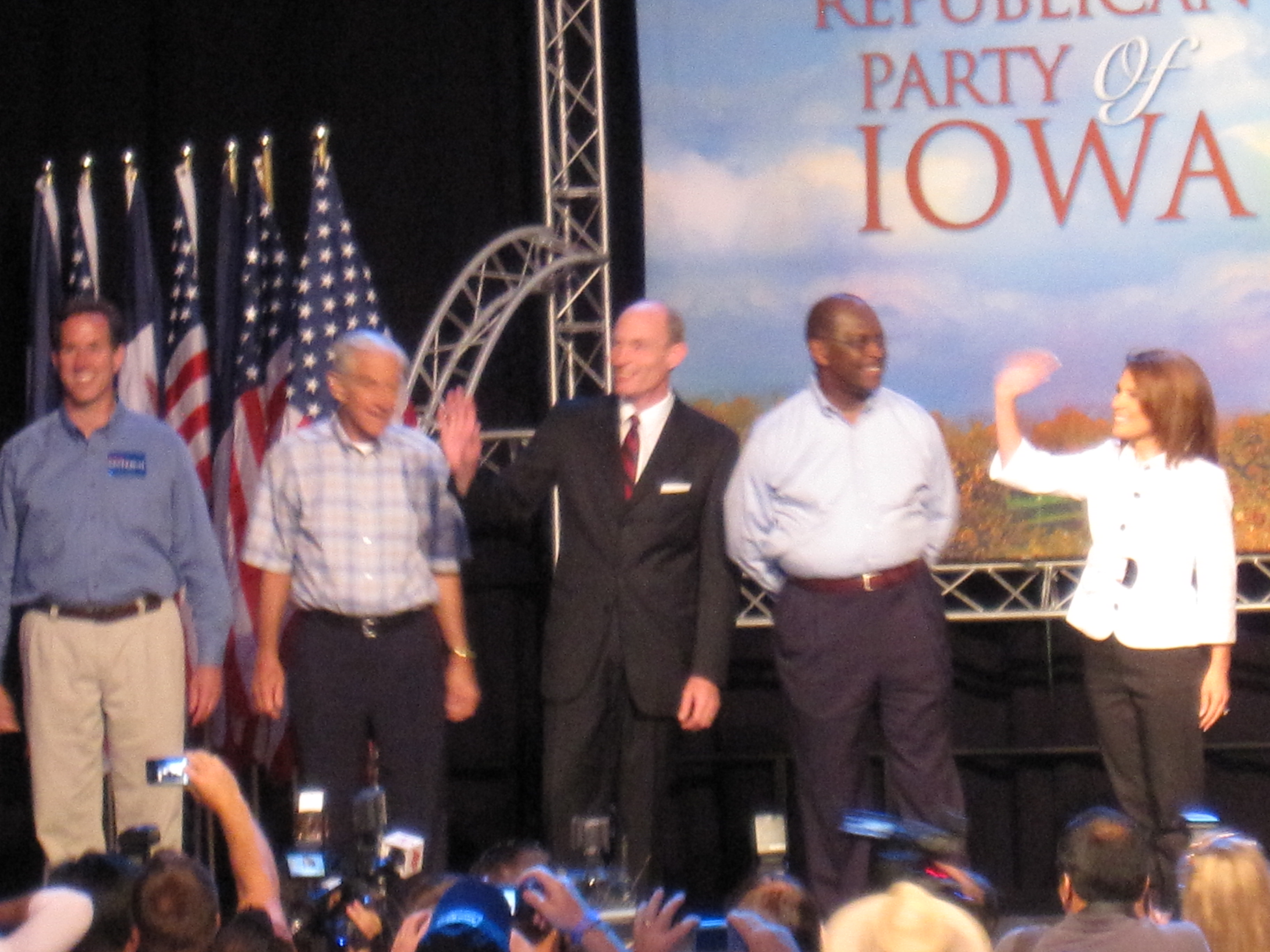
From left, Santorum, Paul, McCotter, Cain, Bachmann

The 2011 Iowa Straw Poll was held on August 13, 2011, at the Hilton Coliseum in Ames, Iowa.

Sources of results: Washington Examiner and National Journal

Place	Candidate	Votes	Percentage
1	Michele Bachmann	4,823	28.6%
2	Ron Paul	4,671	27.7%
3	Tim Pawlenty	2,293	13.6%
4	Rick Santorum	1,657	9.8%
5	Herman Cain	1,456	8.6%
6	Rick Perry (write-in)	718	4.3%
7	Mitt Romney	567	3.4%
8	Newt Gingrich	385	2.3%
9	Jon Huntsman	69	0.4%
10	Thaddeus McCotter	35	0.2%
—	Scattering	218	1.30%
Total		16,892	100%

Michelle Bachmann brought country superstar Randy Travis to the 2011 Ames Straw Poll and handed out flyers instructing voters that a free concert would be granted only after voting in the Ames Straw Poll and with this strategy Bachmann won the Straw Poll. Mitt Romney and Jon Huntsman were on the ballot but did not actively compete in the 2011 straw poll. The day after the poll, on August 14, Tim Pawlenty announced his withdrawal from the race after his third-place finish. Rick Perry, who was not on the poll ballot and only appeared as a write-in candidate, formally announced his candidacy while in South Carolina on the same day that the poll took place.

==== 2015 ====
In 2015, the Republican Party of Iowa, concerned about the cost charged by Iowa State University in 2011, publicly solicited bids from other potential event sites. On March 12, 2015, Boone was announced as the winning bidder, after a vote by GOP party board members. However, several of the Republican presidential candidates—including Jeb Bush, Lindsey Graham, Mike Huckabee, and Marco Rubio—announced that they would not take part in the straw poll. On June 12, 2015, the Republican Party of Iowa announced that, as the result of a unanimous vote, the straw poll would no longer be held due to the decline in candidate support.

Despite the absence of an official straw poll, the 2015 Iowa State Fair held an informal poll of its attendees (both Republican and Democrat), and found Donald Trump to be the most favored GOP candidate, and Bernie Sanders the most popular Democrat. Ted Cruz went on to win the Iowa GOP caucuses, defeating Donald Trump by 4 percent, while Hillary Clinton defeated Bernie Sanders by less than 1 percent on the Democratic side.

== See also ==
- Iowa State Fair Straw Poll
