= 2012 Guam Republican presidential caucuses =

- March 10, 2012
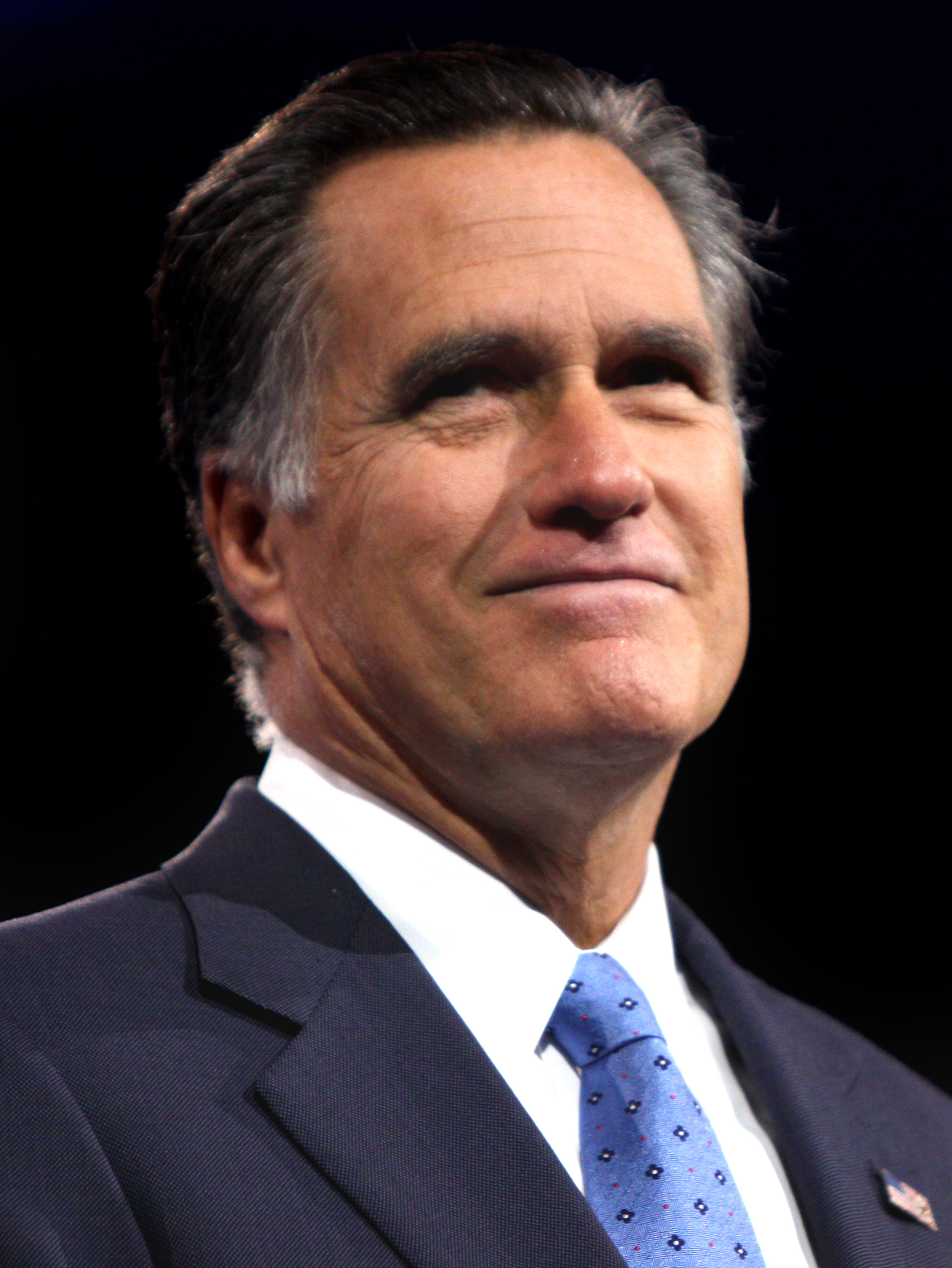

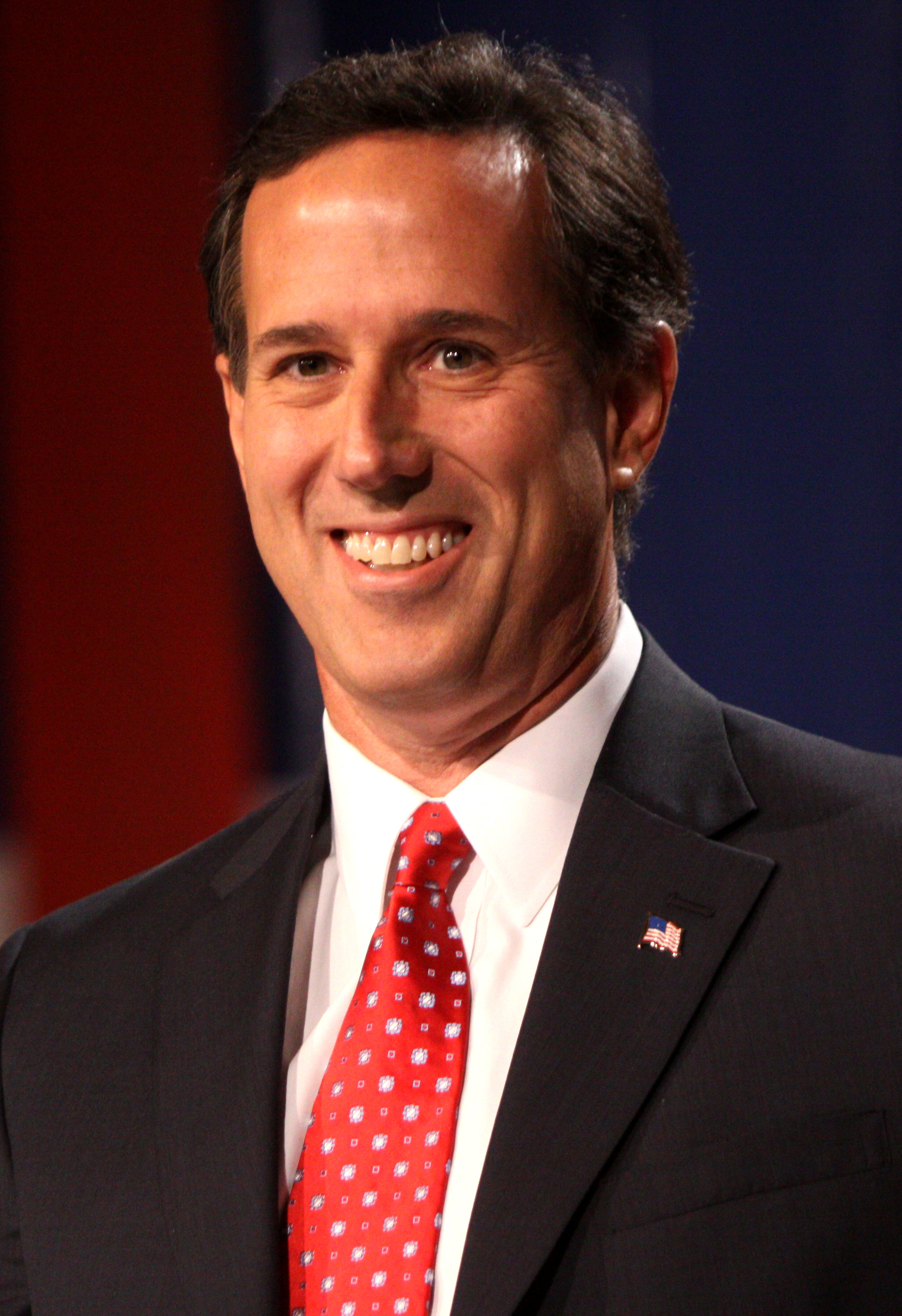

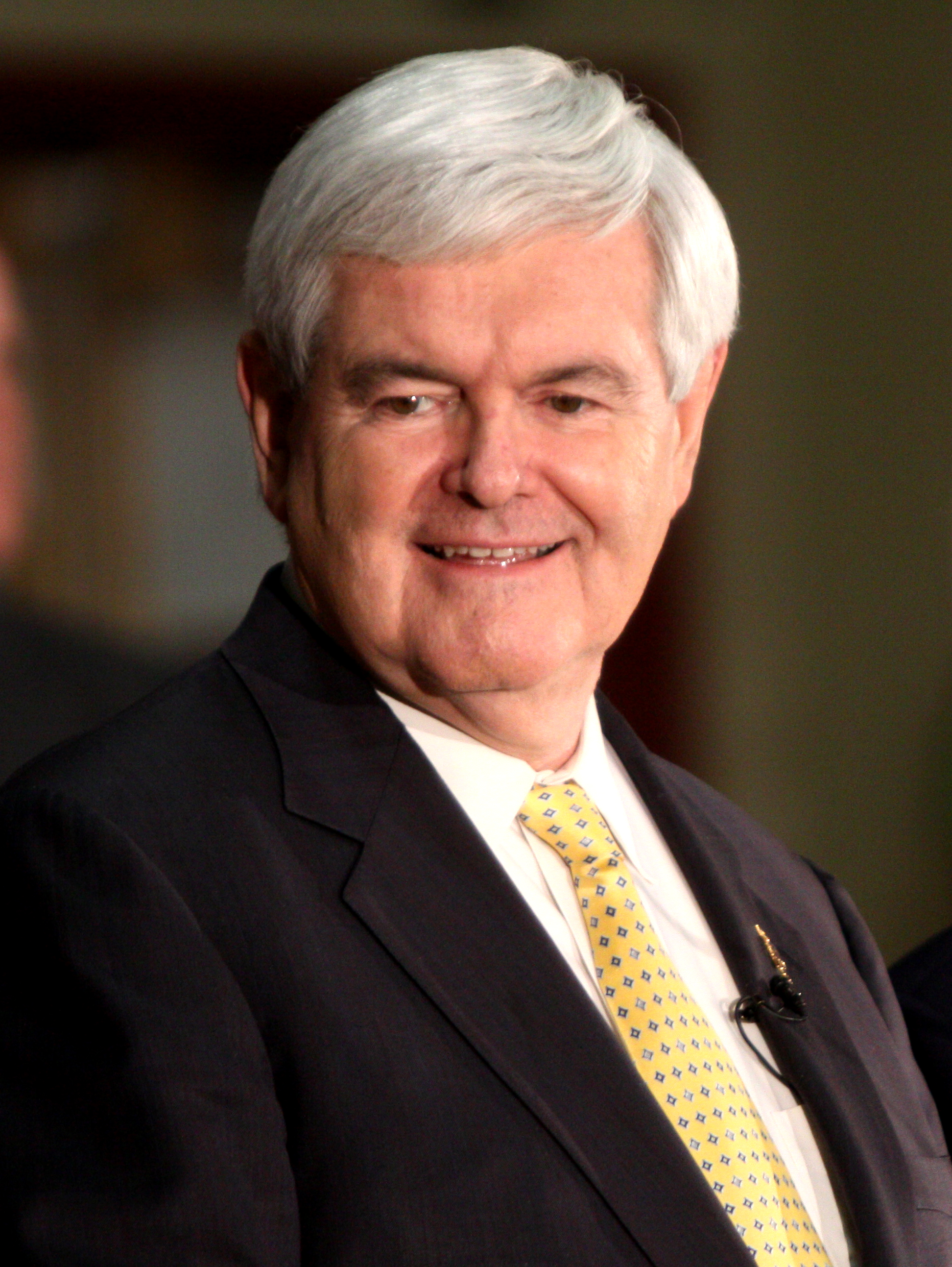

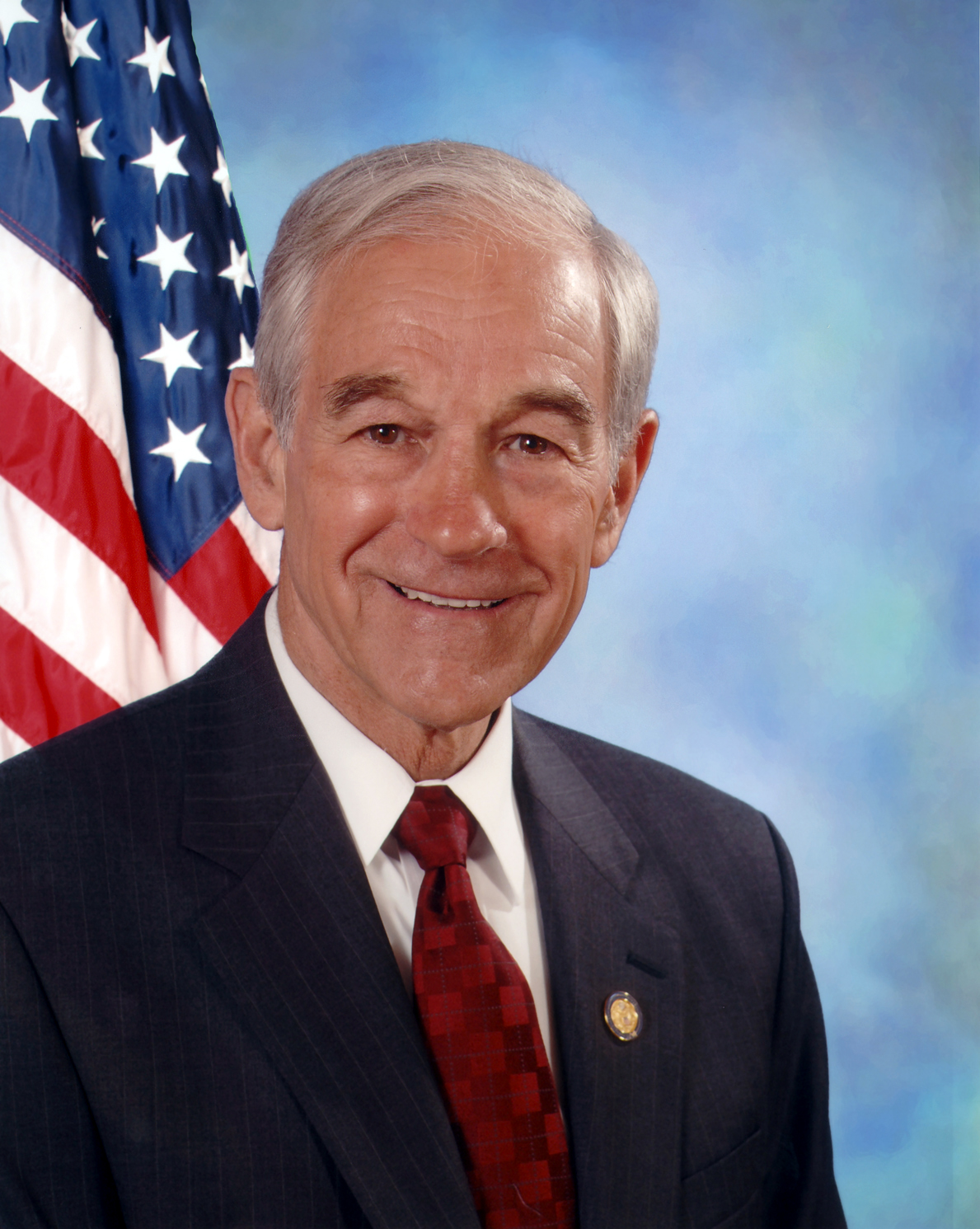
Candidate	Mitt Romney	Rick Santorum
Party	Republican	Republican
Home state	Massachusetts	Pennsylvania
Estimated delegate count	9	0
Candidate	Newt Gingrich	Ron Paul
Party	Republican	Republican
Home state	Georgia	Texas
Estimated delegate count	0	0

The 2012 Guam Republican presidential caucuses were held on March 10, 2012. Citizens of Guam send nine delegates to the convention. Former Massachusetts Governor Mitt Romney won the territory almost unanimously, with 207 of the 215 registered Republicans at the convention supporting him. Mitt Romney's son, Matt, campaigned in Saipan to represent his father at the convention.

The events occurred on the same day as the 2012 Kansas and United States Virgin Islands Republican caucuses.

== Results ==
Guam Republican caucuses, 2012
Candidate	Votes	Percentage	Delegates
Mitt Romney	207	96%	9
Rick Santorum	0	0%	0
Newt Gingrich	0	0%	0
Ron Paul	0	0%	0
Uncommitted	8	4%	0
Unprojected delegates:			0
Total:	215	100%	9

== See also ==
- 2012 United States presidential straw poll in Guam
- 2012 United States presidential election
- 2012 Guam Democratic presidential caucuses
