= United States presidential straw polls in Guam =

Presidential straw polls in Guam
- Number of straw polls: 12
- Voted Democratic: 8
- Voted Republican: 4
- Voted for winning candidate: 9
- Voted for losing candidate: 3

Because it is a U.S. territory instead of a U.S. state, voters in Guam are ineligible to elect members of the Electoral College, who would then cast direct electoral votes for president and vice president. The territory nonetheless conducts a non-binding straw poll on the day of the presidential general election to gauge the preference for president every election year.

The poll has been held in Guam during every presidential election since 1980. It was established after the Legislature of Guam passed Public Law 15-49, which requires the Guam Election Commission to conduct the poll. The law also instructs the chairman of the board of the Guam Election Commission to essentially conduct a meeting of electors like those in the states and act as the territory's sole elector, including formally casting an electoral college ballot for the presidential ticket receiving the highest number of votes in the territory, and then officially sending the result to the U.S. Congress.

Because Guam is 15 hours ahead of the contiguous United States, the poll is regarded as an indicator of how the rest of the country will vote. The territory is home to three U.S. military bases and current and former service members and has historically had a higher voter turnout than the mainland. Since 1980, the results of the Guam poll have aligned with the results of the mainland, except in three instances: in 1980, when the islanders favored Jimmy Carter instead of eventual winner Ronald Reagan, in 2016, when they favored Hillary Clinton instead of Donald Trump, and in 2024, when they favored Kamala Harris instead of Donald Trump.

== Results ==
Winners of the territory are in bold.

Key for parties
Democratic Party – (D)
Green Party – (G)
Independent candidate – (I)
Libertarian Party – (LI)
Republican Party – (R)
Socialist Party of America – (S)

Note – A double dagger (‡) indicates the national winner.
Note – Percentages may not total 100.0%.

Election results
Year	Winner			Runner-up			Other candidate (Note: For purpose of this list, other candidates are defined as those who were in third place in Guam.)			Ref.
Year	Candidate	Votes	%	Candidate	Votes	%	Candidate	Votes	%	Ref.
2024	**Kamala Harris** (D)	13,510	49.46	Donald Trump (R)‡	12,624	46.22	Robert F. Kennedy Jr. (I)	938	3.43	
2020	**Joe Biden** (D)‡	14,610	55.38	Donald Trump (R)	11,058	41.91	Howie Hawkins (G)	185	0.70	
2016	**Hillary Clinton** (D)	23,052	71.62	Donald Trump (Note: Won the electoral college while losing the popular vote) (R)‡	7,779	24.17	Mimi Soltysik (S)	1,357	4.22	
2012	**Barack Obama** (D)‡	22,688	72.51	Mitt Romney (R)	8,252	26.37	Gary Johnson (LI)	351	1.12	
2008	**Barack Obama** (D)‡	20,119	57.33	John McCain (R)	11,941	34.03				
2004	**George W. Bush** (R)‡	21,490	64.08	John Kerry (D)	11,781	35.13				
2000	**George W. Bush** (R)‡	18,075	51.58	Al Gore (D)	16,549	47.22				
1996	**Bill Clinton** (D)‡	19,265	59.67	Bob Dole (R)	12,524	38.79				
1992	**Bill Clinton** (D)‡	10,233	59.11	George H. W. Bush (R)	6,817	39.38				
1988	**George H. W. Bush** (R)‡	14,241	58.84	Michael Dukakis (D)	9,646	39.86				
1984	**Ronald Reagan** (R)‡	17,259	63.97	Walter Mondale (D)	9,429	34.95				
1980	**Jimmy Carter** (D)	14,352	57.01	Ronald Reagan (R)‡	9,658	38.37	John B. Anderson (I)	954	3.79	
