= 2012 United States presidential straw poll in Guam =

- November 6, 2012

Non-binding preference poll

Nominee	Barack Obama	Mitt Romney
Party	Democratic	Republican
Home state	Illinois	Massachusetts
Running mate	Joe Biden	Paul Ryan
Popular vote	22,688	8,252
Percentage	72.51%	26.37%
- Results by village Obama 60–70% 70–80% 80–90%

The 2012 United States presidential straw poll in Guam was held on November 6, 2012. Guam is a territory and not a state. Thus, it is ineligible to elect members of the Electoral College, who would then in turn cast direct electoral votes for president and for vice president. To draw attention to this fact, the territory conducts a non-binding presidential straw poll during the general election as if they did elect members to the Electoral College.

The territory still participated in the U.S. presidential caucuses and primaries like the other states and territories.

Incumbent president and Democratic Party nominee Barack Obama won the poll with over 70% of the vote.

== Results ==
2012 United States presidential straw poll in Guam
Party	Ticket	Votes	Percentage
Democratic	Barack Obama for President Joe Biden for Vice President	22,688	72.51%
Republican	Mitt Romney for President Paul Ryan for Vice President	8,252	26.37%
Libertarian	Gary Johnson for President Jim Gray for Vice President	351	1.12%
Totals		31,291	100.00%

=== Votes cast by village ===
Village	Barack Obama Democratic		Mitt Romney Republican		Gary Johnson Libertarian		Total
Village	#	%	#	%	#	%	Total
Agana Heights	901	71.17%	350	27.65%	15	1.18%	1,266
Agat	1,252	75.56%	381	22.99%	24	1.45%	1,657
Asan-Maina	564	78.12%	152	21.05%	6	0.83%	722
Barrigada	1,427	67.89%	645	30.69%	30	1.43%	2,102
Chalan-Pago-Ordot	1,119	73.91%	379	25.03%	16	1.06%	1,514
Dededo	4,383	73.34%	1,542	25.80%	51	0.85%	5,976
Hagåtña	211	65.33%	106	32.82%	6	1.86%	323
Inarajan	1,106	80.44%	262	19.05%	7	0.51%	1,375
Mangilao	1,545	72.13%	570	26.61%	27	1.26%	2,142
Merizo	752	80.77%	172	18.47%	7	0.75%	931
Mongmong-Toto-Maite	854	66.77%	410	32.06%	15	1.17%	1,279
Piti	439	67.64%	202	31.12%	8	1.23%	649
Santa Rita	794	72.91%	284	26.08%	11	1.01%	1,089
Sinajana	900	71.88%	326	26.04%	26	2.08%	1,252
Talofofo	808	76.81%	234	22.24%	10	0.95%	1,052
Tamuning	1,697	65.62%	856	33.10%	33	1.28%	2,586
Umatac	400	74.07%	137	25.37%	3	0.56%	540
Yigo	2,258	72.51%	819	26.30%	37	1.19%	3,114
Yona	1,278	74.22%	425	24.68%	19	1.10%	1,722
Total	22,688	72.51%	8,252	26.37%	351	1.12%	31,291

== See also ==
- 2012 United States presidential election
- 2012 Guam Democratic presidential caucuses
- 2012 Guam Republican presidential caucuses
