= Iowa State Fair Straw Poll =

Informal poll at Iowa State Fair

The Iowa State Fair Straw Poll (Note: Also referred to as the Iowa Straw Poll, though that more properly is the name for the poll conducted from 1979–2011 by the Iowa State Republican Party.) is an informal poll for presidential and Iowa congressional candidates. The poll has been conducted by the Iowa Secretary of State with results posted to their website. It was begun in 2015 after the Republican Party of Iowa announced it would no longer hold its official Iowa Straw Poll given that a majority of presidential candidates declined to participate.

== 2015 Results ==
In 2015, the State Fair poll found Donald Trump to be the most favored GOP candidate among 677 votes cast, defeating Ben Carson and Sen. Ted Cruz (Texas). Cruz went on to win the Iowa GOP caucuses, defeating Trump by 4 percent. On the Democratic side, out of a little more than 1,000 votes total, Hillary Clinton was the most popular Democrat defeating Bernie Sanders 49 percent to 45 percent. Clinton went on to defeat Sanders in the Democratic state primary by less than 1 percent.

=== Democratic ===
Source of results: Iowa Secretary of State

Candidate	Straw poll results			Actual caucus results		Difference	
Candidate	Place	Votes	Percentage	Place	Percentage	Place	Percentage
Hillary Clinton	1	1,338	49.19%	1	49.84%	--	-0.65%
Bernie Sanders	2	1,217	44.17%	2	49.59%	--	+5.42%
Martin O'Malley	3	127	4.67%	3	0.54%	--	-4.13%
Lincoln Chafee	4	20	0.74%	Withdrawn			
Jim Webb	5	18	0.66%	Withdrawn			

=== Republican ===
Source of results: Iowa Secretary of State

Candidate	Straw poll results			Actual caucus results			Difference	
Candidate	Place	Votes	Percentage	Place	Votes	Percentage	Place	Percentage
Donald Trump	1	1,830	29.91%	2	45,427	24.30%	-1	-5.61%
Ben Carson	2	1,185	19.37%	4	17,395	9.30%	-2	-10.07%
Ted Cruz	3	543	8.88%	1	43,165	27.64%	+2	+14.24%
Carly Fiorina	4	459	7.50%	7	3,485	1.86%	-3	-5.64%
Marco Rubio	5	370	6.05%	3	43,165	23.12%	+2	+17.07%
Scott Walker	6	324	5.30%	Withdrawn				
Jeb Bush	7	312	5.10%	6	5,238	2.80%	+1	-2.30%
Bobby Jindal	8	225	3.68%	Withdrawn				
Mike Huckabee	9	188	3.07%	9	3,345	1.79%	--	-1.28%
Rand Paul	10	182	2.97%	5	8,481	4.54%	+5	+1.57%
John Kasich	11	160	2.62%	8	3,474	1.86%	+3	-0.76%
Rick Perry	12	137	2.24%	Withdrawn				
Chris Christie	13	66	1.08%	10	3,284	1.76%	+3	-0.68%
Rick Santorum	14	65	1.06%	11	1,783	0.95%	+3	-0.11%
Lindsey Graham	15	39	0.64%	Withdrawn				
George Pataki	16	24	0.39%	Withdrawn				
Mark Everson	17	8	0.13%	Withdrawn				
Jim Gilmore	18	1	0.02%	12	12	0.01%	+6	-0.01%

== 2019 Results ==
In 2019, the State Fair saw a record-setting attendance of just under 1.2 million people over the course of its 11-day run. The Straw Poll result was published on August 19, 2019. On the Republican side, in total 1,976 votes were cast for 2 candidates. On the Democratic side, there were 24 candidates listed in the presidential poll and 2,118 votes cast.

=== Democratic ===
Candidate	Straw poll results			Actual caucus results			Difference	
Candidate	Place	Votes	Percentage	Place	Votes	Percentage	Place	Percentage
Joe Biden	1	374	17.7%	4	26,291	14.9%	-3	-2.8%
Elizabeth Warren	2	364	17.2%	3	32,589	18.5%	-1	+1.3%
Pete Buttigieg	3	292	13.8%	2	37,572	21.3%	+1	+7.5%
Bernie Sanders	4	215	10.2%	1	43,581	24.7%	+3	+14.5%
Kamala Harris	5	178	8.4%	Withdrawn				
Cory Booker	6	129	6.1%	Withdrawn				
Tulsi Gabbard	7	101	4.8%	9	341	0.2%	-2	-4.6%
Amy Klobuchar	8	73	3.5%	5	22,454	12.7%	+3	+9.2%
Tom Steyer	9	60	2.8%	7	3,061	1.7%	+2	-1.1%
Andrew Yang	10	58	2.7%	6	8,914	5.1%	+3	+2.4%
Beto O'Rourke	11	46	2.2%	Withdrawn				
Marianne Williamson	12	33	1.6%	Withdrawn				
Steve Bullock	13	33	1.6%	Withdrawn				
Julian Castro	14	32	1.5%	Withdrawn				
John Delaney	15	26	1.2%	Withdrawn				
Kirsten Gillibrand	16	22	1.0%	Withdrawn				
Michael Bennet	17	19	0.9%	10	164	1.0%	+7	-0.1%
Bill de Blasio	18	18	0.9%	Withdrawn				
John Hickenlooper	19	14	0.7%	Withdrawn				
Jay Inslee	20	11	0.5%	Withdrawn				
Tim Ryan	21	7	0.3%	Withdrawn				
Seth Moulton	22	5	0.2%	Withdrawn				
Joe Sestak	23	4	0.2%	Withdrawn				
Wayne Messam	24	4	0.2%	Withdrawn				

=== Republican ===
Candidate	Straw poll results			Actual caucus results			Difference	
Candidate	Place	Votes	Percentage	Place	Votes	Percentage	Place	Percentage
Donald Trump	1	1,902	96.26%	1	31,421	97.14%	--	-0.88%
Bill Weld	2	74	3.74%	2	425	1.31%	--	-2.43%

== 2023 Results ==
=== Democratic ===
Source of results: Iowa Secretary of State

Candidate	Straw poll results		
Candidate	Place	Votes	Percentage
Joe Biden	1	732	66.97%
Robert F. Kennedy Jr.	2	205	18.76%
Marianne Williamson	3	156	14.27%

=== Republican ===
Source of results: Iowa Secretary of State

Candidate	Straw poll results			Actual caucus results			Difference	
Candidate	Place	Votes	Percentage	Place	Votes	Percentage	Place	Percentage
Donald Trump	1	1,501	42.47%	1	56,260	51.01%	--	+8.54%
Ron DeSantis	2	541	15.31%	2	23,420	21.23%	--	+5.92%
Tim Scott	3	392	11.09%	Withdrawn				
Vivek Ramaswamy	4	331	9.37%	4	8,449	7.66%	--	-1.71%
Perry Johnson	5	220	6.23%	Withdrawn				
Nikki Haley	6	133	3.76%	3	21,085	19.12%	+3	+15.36%
Asa Hutchinson	7	120	3.40%	6	191	0.17%	+1	-3.23%
Mike Pence	8	97	2.74%	Withdrawn				
Doug Burgum	9	96	2.72%	Withdrawn				
Will Hurd	10	37	1.05%	Withdrawn				
Ryan Binkley	11	27	0.76%	5	774	0.70%	+6	-0.06%
Francis Suarez	12	23	0.65%	Withdrawn				
Larry Elder	13	16	0.45%	Withdrawn				

=== Libertarian ===
Source of results: Iowa Secretary of State

Candidate	Straw poll results			Actual caucus results		Difference	
Candidate	Place	Votes	Percentage	Place	Percentage	Place	Percentage
Chase Oliver	1 (tied)	27	18.88%	1	42.70%	--	+23.82%
Raymond Dude Wagner	1 (tied)	27	18.88%	Did not compete			
Aaron Avouris	3 (tied)	11	7.69%	Did not compete			
Melissa Biondi	3 (tied)	11	7.69%	Did not compete			
Hugo Valdez Garcia	5	10	6.99%	Did not compete			
David Reed DeSilva	6 (tied)	8	5.59%	Did not compete			
Jon Stewart	6 (tied)	8	5.59%	Did not compete			
David Dunlap	8 (tied)	6	4.20%	Did not compete			
Jacob Hornberger	8 (tied)	6	4.20%	8 (tied)	1.12%	--	-2.08%
Kevin Babicz	10 (tied)	5	3.50%	Did not compete			
Charles Griffith Ferry	10 (tied)	5	3.50%	Did not compete			
Antonio Gagnon	12 (tied)	4	2.80%	Did not compete			
Mike ter Maat	12 (tied)	4	2.80%	3	13.48%	+9	+10.68%
Russell DeLeon	14 (tied)	3	2.10%	Did not compete			
Lars Mapstead	14 (tied)	3	2.10%	8 (tied)	1.12%	+6	-0.98%
Joshua Rodriguez	16 (tied)	2	1.40%	Did not compete			
Nathan J. Vaught Jr.	16 (tied)	2	1.40%	Did not compete			
Seymour Art Lee	18	1	0.70%	Did not compete			
Beau Lindsey	19 (tied)	0	0.00%	Did not compete			
Kevin Tucker	19 (tied)	0	0.00%	Did not compete			
