= 2012 U.S. Virgin Islands Republican presidential caucuses =

- March 10, 2012
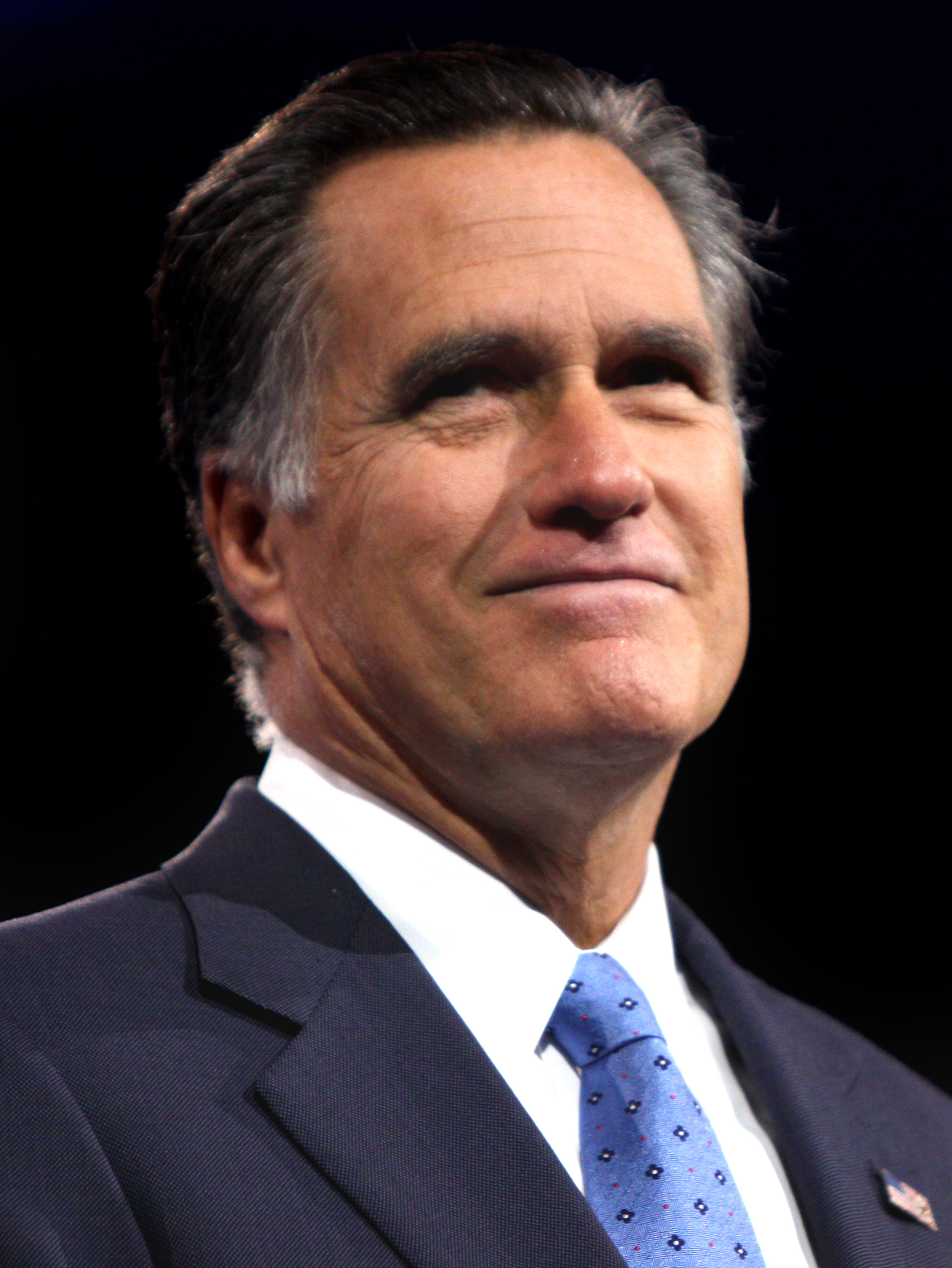

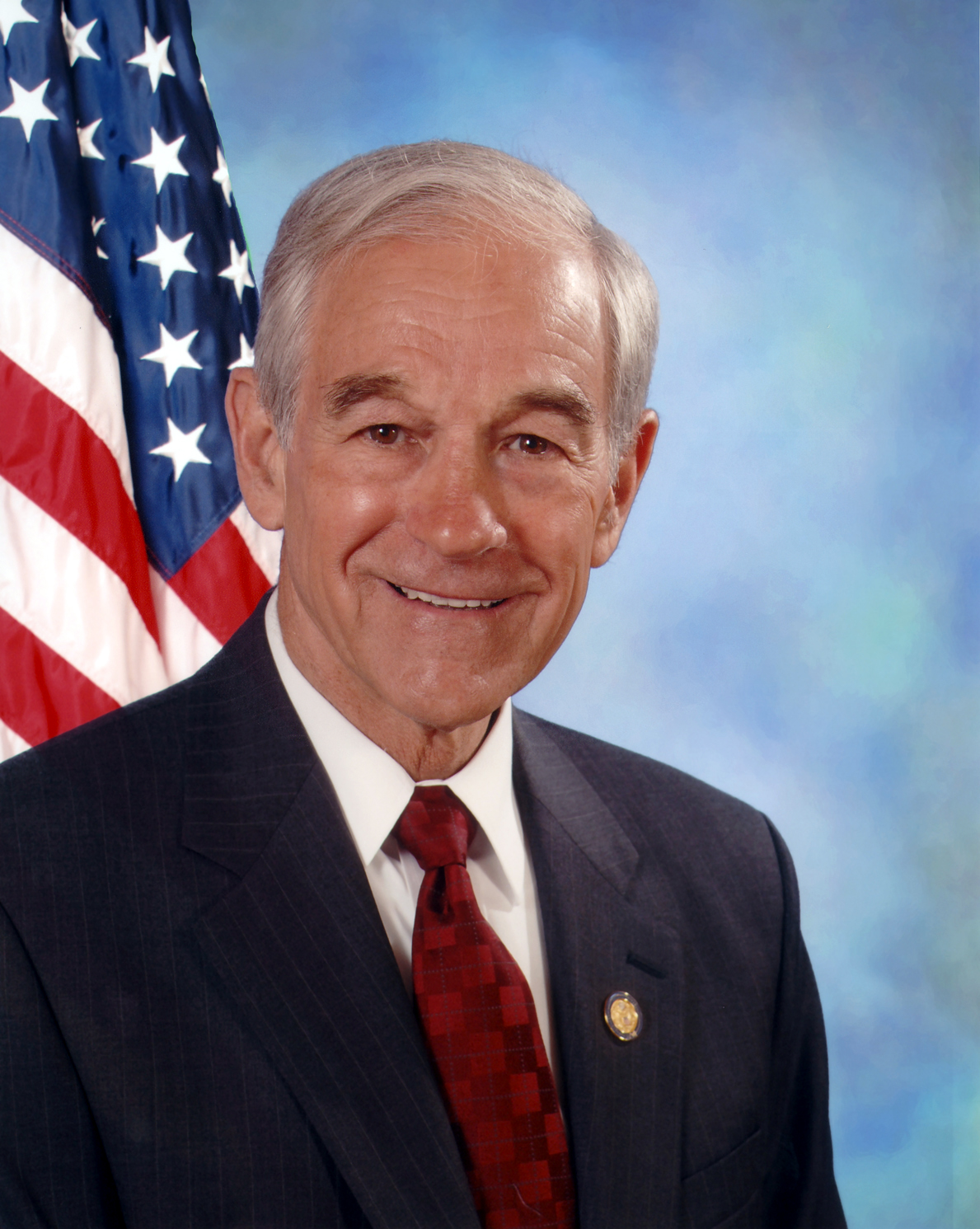

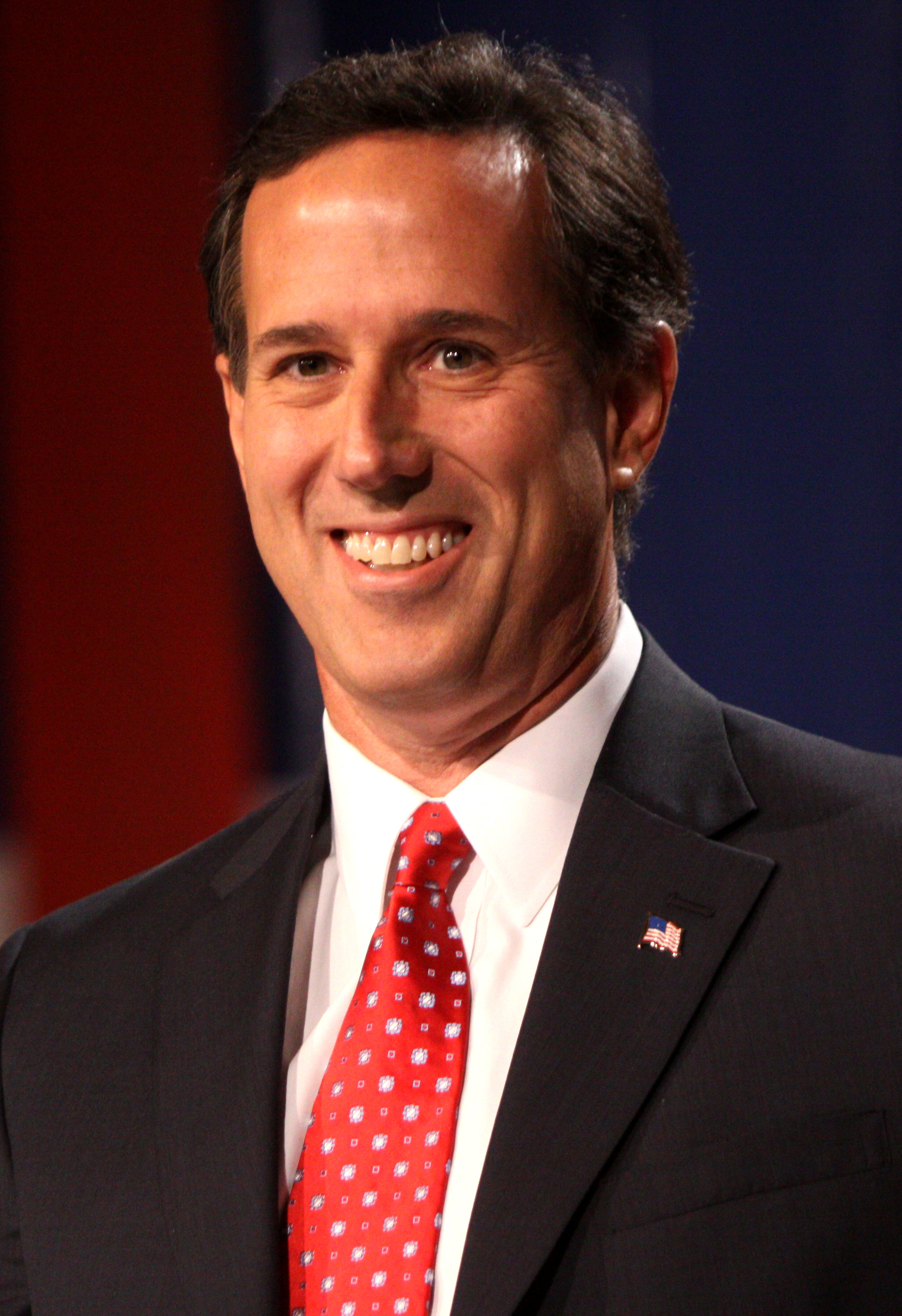

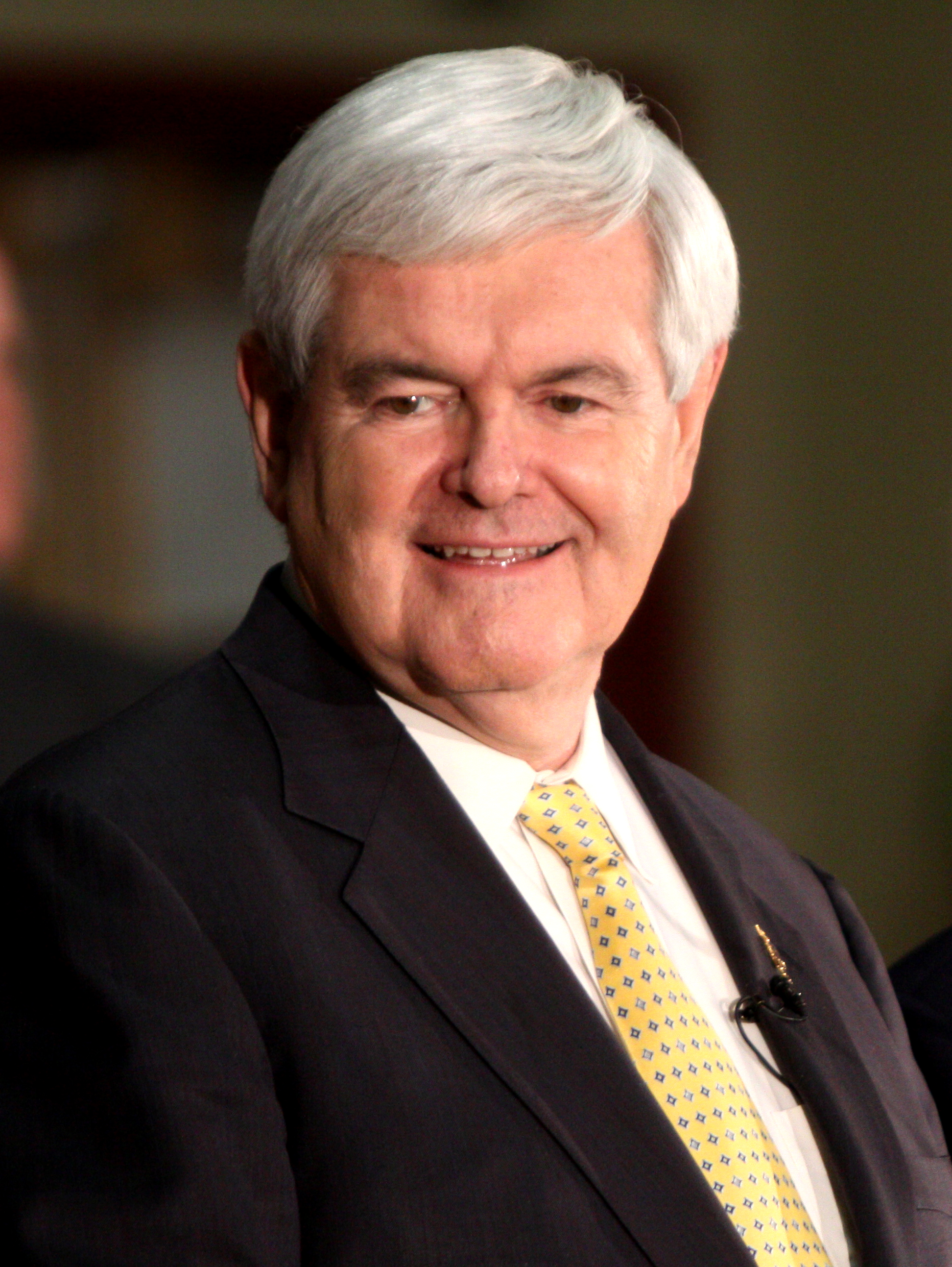
Candidate	Mitt Romney	Ron Paul
Party	Republican	Republican
Home state	Massachusetts	Texas
Delegate count	7	1
Popular vote	104	112
Percentage	26.7%	28.7%
Candidate	Rick Santorum	Newt Gingrich
Party	Republican	Republican
Home state	Pennsylvania	Georgia
Delegate count	0	0
Popular vote	23	19
Percentage	5.9%	4.9%

The 2012 U.S. Virgin Islands Republican presidential caucuses were held on March 10, 2012, the same day as the Guam, Northern Mariana Islands, and Kansas Republican caucuses. Unlike standard caucuses, the delegates for the Virgin Islands were elected directly by GOP caucus-goers during the first round. No straw poll was taken at the caucus, but the delegates were bound to the candidate they pledged themselves to before the voting started. The six delegates receiving the most votes go to the National Convention. Three of the top vote-getters had previously pledged to Romney, and one had pledged to Paul. In addition, two of the elected uncommitted delegates committed themselves to Romney after the election. Like Puerto Rico, the U.S. Virgin Islands cannot participate in the general election, but they can participate in the primaries.

== Results ==
United States Virgin Islands Republican caucuses, 2012
Delegates	Votes	Affiliation
April Newland	42	Romney
Gwendolyn Brady ^{#}	37	Uncommitted
John A. Clendenin	32	Romney
Warren Bruce Cole ^{#}	31	Uncommitted
Luis R. Martinez	30	Romney
Robert Max Schanfarber	29	Paul
Joshua A. Schanfarber	21	Paul
Humberto O’Neal	20	Uncommitted
Geoffrey Wolfe	18	Paul
George Blackhall	16	Uncommitted
Dwain E. Ford	16	Gingrich
Vince Danet	15	Santorum
Roseann Wells	15	Paul
Michael Wilson	15	Paul
Eddie Jane Simmons	14	Paul
Kimberly Lynn Jones	12	Uncommitted
DeWayne Bridges	8	Santorum
James Bland	4	Uncommitted
Dennis Best	4	Uncommitted
Patrick Witcher	4	Uncommitted
Steve Mitchum	4	Uncommitted
Steven Hardy	3	Gingrich

^{#} Committed to Romney after he was elected

=== Delegate totals ===
In the Virgin Islands caucus, votes were cast for specific delegates rather than specific candidates; the top six vote-getters became delegates. The candidates included six delegates declaring for Paul, three for Romney, two for Gingrich, two for Santorum, and nine that had not declared for any candidate. Even though Romney had only three delegates on the ballot, they received more votes than most of the other pledged delegates, and all three were elected, whereas only one of Paul's delegates got enough votes to place in the top six. Two uncommitted delegates were elected along with the four pledged ones; one of these switched to Romney after the vote was conducted, giving the Massachusetts governor four total elected delegates, plus three super delegates from the territory that had already pledged to him before the caucus. This yielded a total of seven delegates for Romney, one for Paul and two uncommitted.

=== Popular vote ===
Raw vote totals showed that even though only one of Paul's delegates was elected, the combined showing for all six Paul pledges on the ballot exceeded that of the delegates for the other candidates. In all, 112 votes were cast for Paul's pledges, 104 for Romney's, 23 for Santorum's, 19 for Gingrich's. Uncommitted delegates got the highest combined vote total, however, at 132. At first it appeared Romney had received the most popular votes, since the votes for the uncommitted delegate who switched to Romney afterward were mistakenly added to Romney's column by some media Web sites; this was soon corrected.

As each caucus voter was entitled to six votes for all delegates at large (as opposed to voting separately for each delegate), it is not known just how many individual voters cast their ballots for which candidate's pledges; the popular vote totals only reflect the number of raw votes each delegate received in the final tally.
