= 2020 United States presidential straw poll in Guam =

- November 3, 2020

Non-binding preference poll

Nominee	Joe Biden	Donald Trump
Party	Democratic	Republican
Home state	Delaware	Florida
Running mate	Kamala Harris	Mike Pence
Popular vote	14,610	11,058
Percentage	55.38%	41.91%
- Results by village Biden 50–60% 60–70%

The 2020 United States presidential straw poll in Guam was held on November 3, 2020. Guam is a territory and not a state. Thus, it is ineligible to elect members of the Electoral College, who would then in turn cast direct electoral votes for president and for vice president. To draw attention to this fact, the territory conducts a non-binding presidential straw poll during the general election as if they did elect members to the Electoral College.

The territory still participated in the U.S. presidential caucuses and primaries like the other states and territories.

Democratic Party nominee Joe Biden won the poll with 55% of the vote.

== Results ==
Though the votes of Guam residents do not count in the November general election, the territory nonetheless conducts a presidential straw poll to gauge islanders' preference for president every election year. The poll has been held in Guam during every presidential election since 1980.

2020 United States presidential straw poll in Guam
Party	Candidate	Votes	%	±%
Democratic	Joe Biden Kamala Harris	14,610	55.38	▼16.24
Republican	Donald Trump Mike Pence	11,058	41.91	▲17.75
Green	Howie Hawkins Angela Walker	185	0.70	n/a
Libertarian	Jo Jorgensen Spike Cohen	169	0.64	n/a
Progressive	Dario Hunter Dawn Neptune Adams	140	0.53	n/a
American Solidarity	Brian Carroll Amar Patel	138	0.52	n/a
Prohibition	Phil Collins Billy Joe Parker	83	0.31	n/a
Total votes		26,383	100.00	

== See also ==
- 2020 United States presidential election
- 2020 Guam presidential caucuses
