= Straw poll =

Ad-hoc or unofficial vote

A straw poll, straw vote, or straw ballot is an ad hoc or unofficial vote. It is used to show the popular opinion on a certain matter, and can be used to help politicians know the majority opinion and help them decide what to say in order to gain votes.

Straw polls provide dialogue among movements within large groups. Impromptu straw polls often are taken to see if there is enough support for an idea to devote more meeting time to it, and (when not a secret ballot) for the attendees to see who is on which side of a question. However, in meetings subject to Robert's Rules of Order, motions to take straw polls are not allowed.

Among political bodies, straw polls often are scheduled for events at which many people interested in the polling question can be expected to vote. Sometimes polls conducted without ordinary voting controls in place (i.e., on an honor system, such as in online polls) are also called "straw polls".

The idiom may allude to a straw (thin plant stalk) held up to see in what direction the wind blows, in this case, the metaphorical wind of group opinion.

== Per country ==
=== United States ===
A formal straw poll is common in American political caucuses. Such straw polls can be taken before selecting delegates and voting on resolutions. The results of straw polls are taken by the media to influence delegates in caucus later (as well as delegates to political conventions), and thus serve as important precursors. Straw polls are also scheduled informally by other organizations interested in the U.S. presidential election.

Well-known American straw polls include the Ames Straw Poll and the Texas Straw Poll, both conducted on behalf of their respective state Republican Party organizations. Being run by private organizations, they are not subject to public oversight or verifiability. However, they provide important interactive dialogue among movements within large groups, reflecting trends like organization and motivation.

The Ames straw poll achieved a reputation as a meaningful straw poll during the presidential campaign because of its large voter turnout and relatively high media recognition, as well as Iowa's being the first state to vote in caucuses before the primaries. In 2015 the Iowa Republican Party voted to abolish the poll, after a majority of presidential candidates declined to participate. The Iowa State Fair Straw Polls for both the Republican and Democratic races were conducted at the Iowa State Fair instead.

The U.S. territories of Guam and since 2024 Puerto Rico hold presidential straw polls during every presidential election, despite the islands having no official say in the election.

=== China ===
Since the 1990s, membership of the Chinese Politburo has been determined through deliberations and straw polls by incumbent and retired members of both the Politburo and the Standing Committee.

== Other types of polls ==
Straw polls are contrasted with opinion polls, usually conducted by telephone and based on samples of the voting public. Straw polls can also be contrasted with honor-system polls (such as online polls), in which ordinary voting controls are absent. In an ordinary event-based straw poll, controls common to elections are enforced: voting twice is prohibited; polls are not open for inordinately long periods of time; interim results are not publicized before polls close; etc. Honor-system polls may be conducted wholly online, conducted at one location over a period of months, conducted with interim results publicized, or even conducted with explicit permission to vote multiple times.

The meaning of results from the varying poll types is disputed. Opinion polls are generally conducted with statistical selection controls in place and are thus called "scientific", while straw polls and honor-system polls are conducted among self-selected populations and are called "unscientific". However, as predictors of poll results among larger populations (i.e., elections), each method has known flaws.

A margin of error is intrinsic in any subset polling method, and is a mathematical function of the difference in size between the subset and the larger population; sampling error is constant across different poll methods with the same sample sizes. Selection bias, nonresponse bias, or coverage bias occurs when the conditions for subset polling significantly differ from the conditions for the larger poll or election; event-based straw polls, where registration often closely mirrors voter registration, suffer less from nonresponse bias than opinion polls, where inclusion generally means owning a landline phone, being the party that answers the phone, being willing to answer the poll questions, and being a "likely voter" based on pollster criteria. Response bias occurs when respondents do not indicate their true beliefs, such as in bias due to intentional manipulation by respondents, haste, social pressure, or confusion; such biases may be present in any polling situation. Wording of questions may also inject bias, although this is more likely in a telephone setting than in an event-based ballot setting.

By relying on identity information, such as that publicly traceable to telephone numbers or voter registration addresses and that voluntarily provided by respondents such as age and gender, polls can be made more scientific. Straw polls may be improved by: asking identity questions, tracing group-based trends, and publishing statistical studies of the data. Opinion polls may be improved by more closely mirroring the larger poll or election anticipated, such as in wording of questions and inclusion procedure. Honor-system polls may be improved by adding ordinary voting controls; for example, online polls may rely on established social-networking and identity providers for verification to minimize multiple voting.

== See also ==
- Straw polls for the Republican Party presidential primaries, 2012
