= 1980 United States presidential straw poll in Guam =

1980 presidential straw poll in Guam
- November 4, 1980

Non-binding preference poll

Nominee	Jimmy Carter	Ronald Reagan
Party	Democratic	Republican
Home state	Georgia	California
Running mate	Walter Mondale	George H.W Bush
Popular vote	14,352	9,658
Percentage	55.4%	37.3%
Village Results
Carter
40–50%
50–60%
60–70%

The 1980 United States presidential straw poll in Guam was the first presidential straw poll held in Guam on November 4, 1980. Guam is a territory and not a state. Thus, it is ineligible to elect members of the Electoral College, who would then in turn cast direct electoral votes for president and for vice president. To draw attention to this fact, the territory conducts a non-binding presidential straw poll during the general election as if they did elect members to the Electoral College. Democratic Party nominee and incumbent president Jimmy Carter won the poll with over 55% of the vote.

== Background ==
The Guam straw poll was established following the passage of Public Law 15-49. It was proposed by Guam representative Carmen Kasperbauer. The law was designed as a way for Guam to demonstrate that whilst their residents had no representation in the Electoral College and thus no legal right to vote for President of the United States, decisions that the President took impacted the island. It was signed into law by the Governor of Guam, Paul M. Calvo.

== Results ==
Though the votes of Guam citizens do not count in the November general election, the territory nonetheless conducts a presidential straw poll to gauge islanders' preference for president every election year. The poll has been held in Guam during every presidential election since 1980.

The voters had the option between four candidates, then Democratic incumbent president Jimmy Carter, Republican Ronald Reagan, former-Republican challenger to Ronald Reagan independent candidate John B. Anderson and libertarian candidate Edward Clark.

The election had 97.3% valid votes, with 2.7% of them being invalid. The votes overwhelmingly favored Jimmy Carter, with Ronald Reagan coming second. Guam subsequently became known as a bellweather poll, with the winner of the Guam straw polls going on to win the Presidency in every election from 1980 until 2016.

1980 United States presidential straw poll in Guam
Party	Candidate	Running mate	Votes	Percentage
Democratic	Jimmy Carter	Walter Mondale	14,352	55.4%
Republican	Ronald Reagan	George H. W. Bush	9,658	37.3%
Independent	John B. Anderson	Patrick Lucey	954	3.7%
Libertarian	Edward Clark	David Hamilton Koch	203	0.8%
Totals			25,883	100.00%

== See also ==
- 1980 United States presidential election
- 1980 Democratic Party primaries
- 1980 Republican Party primaries
